= Jesse Stone =

Jesse Stone may refer to:

== People ==
- Jesse Stone (musician) (1901–1999) was an American musician and songwriter, also known as Charles Calhoun.
- Jesse Stone (Wisconsin politician) (1836–1902), Lieutenant Governor of Wisconsin from 1899 to 1902
- Jesse Stone (Georgia politician) (born 1956), state senator from Georgia (U.S. state)
- Jesse N. Stone (1932–2001), civil rights attorney and judge in Louisiana and president of the Southern University System from 1974 to 1985

== Fiction ==
- Jesse Stone (character), a protagonist in a series of novels by Robert B. Parker, and the film adaptations:
  - Jesse Stone: Stone Cold (2005)
  - Jesse Stone: Night Passage (2006)
  - Jesse Stone: Death in Paradise (2006)
  - Jesse Stone: Sea Change (2007)
  - Jesse Stone: Thin Ice (2009)
  - Jesse Stone: No Remorse (2010)
  - Jesse Stone: Innocents Lost (2011)
  - Jesse Stone: Benefit of the Doubt (2012)
  - Jesse Stone: Lost in Paradise (2015)
