= Tom Selleck on screen and stage =

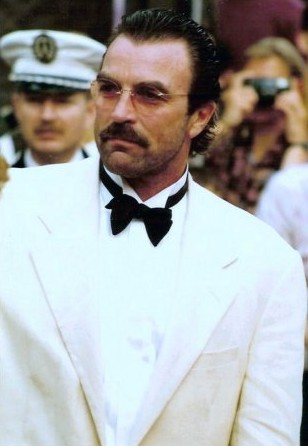
Selleck in 1992

Tom Selleck is an American actor, television and film producer and screenwriter. His breakout role was playing private investigator Thomas Magnum in the television series Magnum, P.I. (1980–1988), for which he received five Emmy Award nominations for Outstanding Lead Actor in a Drama Series, winning in 1985. From 2010 until 2024, Selleck has co-starred as New York City Police Commissioner Frank Reagan in the series Blue Bloods. Beginning in 2005, he has portrayed troubled small-town police chief Jesse Stone in nine television films based on the Robert B. Parker novels.

In films, Selleck has played bachelor architect Peter Mitchell in Three Men and a Baby (1987), and its sequel Three Men and a Little Lady (1990). Other film roles include Quigley Down Under, Mr. Baseball, and Lassiter. He appeared in recurring television roles as Dr. Richard Burke on Friends, as Lance White, the likeable and naive partner on The Rockford Files, and as casino owner A.J. Cooper on Las Vegas. He also had a lead role in the television western film The Sacketts, based on two of Louis L'Amour's books.

== Filmography ==
=== Television ===
| Year | Title | Role | Notes |
|---|---|---|---|
| 1969 | Lancer | Dobie | Episode: "Death Bait" |
| 1969 | Judd for the Defense | Deputy | 2 episodes |
| 1969–1970 | Bracken's World | Roger Haines / Dave Rawson | 8 episodes |
| 1970 | The Movie Murderer | Mike Beaudine | Television film |
| 1971 | Sarge | Captain Denning | Episode: "The Combatants" |
| 1973 | Wide World Mystery | Mark Brolin | Episode: "Shadow of Fear" |
| 1973 | The FBI | Steve | Episode: "The Confession" |
| 1973 | Owen Marshall: Counselor at Law | Brinkley | Episode: "Snatches of a Crazy Song" |
| 1974 | Marcus Welby, M.D. | Lt. Rogers | Episode: "Feedback" |
| 1974 | A Case of Rape | Stan | Television film |
| 1975 | Returning Home | Fred Derry | ABC Movie of the Week |
| 1974–1975 & 2005 | The Young and the Restless | Jed Andrews | Unknown episodes |
| 1975 | Marcus Welby, M.D. | Sgt. Ed Brock | Episodes: "Dark Fury" |
| 1975 | Mannix | Don Brady | Episode: "Design for Dying" |
| 1975 | The Streets of San Francisco | Jimmy Desco | Episode: "Spooks for Sale" |
| 1976 | Most Wanted | Tom Roybo | Episode: "Pilot" |
| 1976 | Charlie's Angels | Dr. Alan Samuelson | Episode: "Target: Angels" |
| 1977 | Bunco | Gordean | Television film |
| 1978 | Taxi | Mike Beldon | Episode: "Memories of Cab 804" |
| 1978–1979 | The Rockford Files | PI Lance White | 2 episodes |
| 1979 | The Chinese Typewriter | Tom Boston | Television film |
| 1979 | The Sacketts | Orrin Sackett | Television film |
| 1979 | Concrete Cowboys | Will Eubanks | Television film |
| 1980–1988 | Magnum, P.I. | Thomas Sullivan Magnum IV | Lead role, 162 episodes |
| 1981 | Christmas in Hawaii | Himself | Television film |
| 1982 | The Fall Guy | Himself | Episode: "License to Kill - Part 2" |
| 1982 | Simon & Simon | Thomas Magnum | Episode: "Emeralds Are Not a Girl's Best Friend" |
| 1982 | The Shadow Riders | Mac Traven | Television film |
| 1983 | James Bond: The First 21 Years | Himself | Documentary |
| 1984 | Muppet Babies | Himself | Episode: "What Do You Want to Be When You Grow Up?" |
| 1986 | Murder, She Wrote | Thomas Magnum | Episode: "Magnum on Ice" |
| 1988 | The World's Greatest Stunts: A Tribute to Hollywood Stuntmen | Himself | Documentary |
| 1992 | Folks! | Jon Aldrich | |
| 1995 | Broken Trust | Judge Timothy Nash | |
| 1996 | Ruby Jean and Joe | Joe Wade | |
| 1996 | Way Out West | Himself | |
| 1996–1997, 2000 | Friends | Dr. Richard Burke | 10 episodes |
| 1997 | Big Guns Talk: The Story of the Western | Himself | Documentary |
| 1997 | Last Stand at Saber River | Paul Cable | Television film |
| 1998 | The Closer | Jack McLaren | 10 episodes |
| 2000 | Running Mates | Gov. James Reynolds Pryce | Television film |
| 2001 | Crossfire Trail | Rafael "Rafe" Covington | Television film |
| 2003 | Touch 'Em All McCall | Touch McCall | Television film |
| 2003 | Monte Walsh | Monte Walsh | Television film |
| 2003 | Twelve Mile Road | Stephen Landis | Television film |
| 2003 | Time Machine: When Cowboys Were King | Himself | Documentary |
| 2004 | Biography | Narrator | Documentary; episode: "Dwight D. Eisenhower: Supreme Commander-in-Chief"| |
| 2004 | Reversible Errors | Larry Starczek | Television film |
| 2004 | Ike: Countdown to D-Day | Gen. Dwight D. Eisenhower | Television film |
| 2005 | Stone Cold | Jesse Stone | Television film |
| 2006 | Boston Legal | Ivan Tiggs | 4 episodes |
| 2006 | Jesse Stone: Night Passage | Jesse Stone | Television film |
| 2006 | Jesse Stone: Death in Paradise | Jesse Stone | Television film |
| 2007 | Jesse Stone: Sea Change | Jesse Stone | Television film |
| 2007–2008 | Las Vegas | A.J. Cooper | 19 episodes |
| 2009 | Jesse Stone: Thin Ice | Jesse Stone | Television film |
| 2010 | Jesse Stone: No Remorse | Jesse Stone | Television film |
| 2010–2024 | Blue Bloods | Frank Reagan | Main role |
| 2011 | Jesse Stone: Innocents Lost | Jesse Stone | Television film |
| 2012 | Jesse Stone: Benefit of the Doubt | Jesse Stone | Television film |
| 2013 | Elway to Marino | Narrator | ESPN 30 for 30 documentary (produced by NFL Films) |
| 2013 | North America | Narrator | 7 episodes |
| 2014 | Arnie | Narrator | 3 episodes |
| 2015 | Jesse Stone: Lost in Paradise | Jesse Stone | Television film |
| 2021 | Friends: The Reunion | Himself | HBO Max |
| 2021 | Out Where the West Begins | Narrator | Discovery+; 4 episodes |

=== Film ===
| Year | Title | Role | Notes |
|---|---|---|---|
| 1970 | Myra Breckinridge | Stud | |
| 1971 | The Seven Minutes | Phil Sanford | |
| 1972 | Daughters of Satan | James Robertson | |
| 1973 | Terminal Island | Dr. Milford | |
| 1976 | Midway | Aide to Capt. Cyril Simard | |
| 1977 | The Washington Affair | Jim Hawley | |
| 1978 | Coma | Sean Murphy | |
| 1978 | Superdome | Jim McCauley | |
| 1978 | The Gypsy Warriors | Captain Theodore Brinkenhoff | |
| 1979 | Concrete Cowboys | Will Eubanks | |
| 1982 | Divorce Wars: A Love Story | Jack Sturgess | |
| 1982 | The Shadow Riders | Mac Tavern | |
| 1983 | High Road to China | Patrick O' Malley | |
| 1984 | Lassiter | Nick Lassiter | |
| 1984 | Runaway | Sgt. Jack R. Ramsay | |
| 1987 | Three Men and a Baby | Peter Mitchell | |
| 1989 | Her Alibi | Phil Blackwood | |
| 1989 | An Innocent Man | Jimmie Rainwood | |
| 1990 | Quigley Down Under | Matthew Quigley | |
| 1990 | Three Men and a Little Lady | Peter Mitchell | |
| 1992 | Folks! | Jon Aldrich | |
| 1992 | Christopher Columbus: The Discovery | King Ferdinand V | |
| 1992 | Mr. Baseball | Jack Elliot | |
| 1995 | Open Season | Rock Maninoff | |
| 1996 | Kids for Character: Choices Count | Himself | Host |
| 1996 | The Magic of Flight | Narrator | Documentary |
| 1997 | In & Out | Peter Malloy | |
| 1999 | The Love Letter | George Matthias | |
| 2007 | Meet the Robinsons | Cornelius Robinson | Voice role |
| 2008 | Meet Dave | John Morrison | Uncredited |
| 2010 | Killers | Mr. Kornfeldt | |
| 2026 | Revolutionary America | Narrator | Documentary |

== Stage ==
2001: A Thousand Clowns as Murray
