= Stone Cold =

Stone Cold may refer to:

== Books ==
- Stone Cold (Swindells novel), a 1993 young adult novel by Robert Swindells
- Stone Cold (Parker novel), a 2003 novel by Robert B. Parker
- Stone Cold (Baldacci novel), a 2007 novel by David Baldacci
- Stone Cold, a 2012 novel by Joel Goldman

== Film and television ==
- Stone Cold (1991 film), an American action film
- Stone Cold (2005 film), an American adaptation of the Parker novel
- Stone Cold (television series), a 1997 BBC adaptation of the Swindells novel

== Music ==
- "Stone Cold" (Demi Lovato song), a song by Demi Lovato from the 2015 album Confident
- "Stone Cold" (Jimmy Barnes song) a song by Jimmy Barnes from the 1993 album Heat
- "Stone Cold" (Rainbow song), a song by British rock band Rainbow from the 1982 album Straight Between the Eyes
- "Stone Cold", a song by HammerFall from the 1997 album Glory to the Brave
- "Stone Cold", a song by FictionJunction

== People with the name ==
- Stone Cold Steve Austin (born 1964), American actor and retired professional wrestler

== See also ==
- Coldstone (disambiguation)
