= Coldstone =

Coldstone could be:

- Coldstone (Gargoyles), a character from the Gargoyles series.
- Cold Stone Creamery, an American-based ice cream parlor chain
- Coldstone (game engine), a game creation suite for the Macintosh
- "Cold Stones", a 2006 episode of US drama The Sopranos
- Coldstones Quarry, a limestone quarry in North Yorkshire, England
- A Scottish term for a charmstone

== See also ==
- Stone Cold (disambiguation)
