= Jesse Stone (character) =

Character in a series of detective novels written by Robert B. Parker

- First appearance: Night Passage
- Created by: Robert B. Parker
- Portrayed by: Tom Selleck

In-universe information
- Gender: Male
- Title(s): Police Chief; Paradise, Massachusetts
- Occupation: Law enforcement officer
- Spouse: Jenn (divorced)
- Nationality: American

Jesse Stone is the lead character in a series of detective novels written by Robert B. Parker. They were among his last works, and the first series in which the novelist used the third-person narrative. The original series consists of nine books, starting with Night Passage (1997) and ending with Split Image (2010), which Parker completed before his death in January 2010 but did not live to see published. The series was initially continued by Michael Brandman. In April 2014, Reed Farrel Coleman assumed the writing of the series, which was subsequently continued by Mike Lupica. Christopher Farnsworth has recently published two more books in the series.

The novels have been adapted into nine TV films. The first eight films were commissioned by CBS, and aired from 2005 to 2012. A ninth film was picked up by the Hallmark Channel, and aired on October 18, 2015. A tenth film was under consideration in 2017.

In an interview in October 2024, Tom Selleck hinted that he may be writing a script for a new Jesse Stone film.

== Overview ==
The character begins the series at about 35 years old. He is a former minor league baseball shortstop whose career was cut short by a shoulder injury. He was raised in Arizona and California. He was asked to resign from his job as a homicide detective for the LAPD Robbery-Homicide Division because of a drinking problem that began after his divorce from his beautiful wife, Jennifer. Showing up, smelling of alcohol, to an interview for a job as police chief for the small town of Paradise, Massachusetts (loosely based on the real town of Marblehead, Massachusetts), Stone is hired because the corrupt president of the town board of selectmen thinks he will be easy to control. Stone quickly notices that the town has big league crimes, struggling with the mob, wildly errant wives and a triple homicide, and that his job will be more difficult than he expected. But, he proves up to the task, beginning with making a corruption case against the town council president and arresting him. In the novels, Stone typically carries a .38 Special snubnosed revolver, the same weapon that he carried as an LAPD detective.

The series chronicles Stone's cases as chief of the Paradise Police Department, as well as his struggles with alcohol and his complicated relationship with his ex-wife Jenn. He is respected and well liked by the police officers in the town police department. He develops a good working relationship and friendship with the State Police Homicide Commander, Captain Healy.

The character of Jesse Stone, a deeply troubled man, was a departure for the author. Parker, comparing Stone to Spenser, the protagonist of his first series and the one for which he was best known, said, "Jesse is a much more damaged individual who is coming to terms with himself as he goes along."

There is some overlap of characters with the Spenser books, notably with Healy and Sunny Randall, and (in Night and Day) indirectly with Susan Silverman.

== Novels ==
By Robert B. Parker:

1. Night Passage (September 1997) ISBN 978-0-399-14304-5
2. Trouble in Paradise (September 1998) ISBN 978-0-399-14433-2
3. Death in Paradise (October 2001) ISBN 978-0-399-14779-1
4. Stone Cold (October 2003) ISBN 978-0-399-15087-6
5. Sea Change (February 2006) ISBN 978-0-399-15267-2
6. High Profile (February 2007) ISBN 978-0-399-15404-1
7. Stranger In Paradise (February 2008) ISBN 978-0-399-15460-7
8. Night and Day (February 2009) ISBN 978-0-399-15541-3
9. Split Image (February 2010) ISBN 978-0-399-15623-6

By Michael Brandman:

1. Robert B. Parker's Killing the Blues (September 2011) ISBN 978-0-399-15784-4
2. Robert B. Parker's Fool Me Twice (September 2012) ISBN 978-0-399-15949-7
3. Robert B. Parker's Damned If You Do (September 2013) ISBN 978-0-399-15950-3

By Reed Farrel Coleman:

1. Robert B. Parker's Blind Spot, G.P. Putnam (September 2014) ISBN 978-0-399-16945-8
2. Robert B. Parker's The Devil Wins, G.P. Putnam (2015)
3. Robert B. Parker's Debt to Pay, G.P. Putnam (September 13, 2016) ISBN 978-0-399-17143-7
4. Robert B. Parker's The Hangman's Sonnet, G.P. Putnam (September 12, 2017) ISBN 978-0-399-17144-4
5. Robert B. Parker's Colorblind G.P. Putnam's Sons (September 11, 2018) ISBN 978-0399574948
6. Robert B. Parker's The Bitterest Pill G.P. Putnam's Sons (September 10, 2019) ISBN 978-0399574979

By Mike Lupica:

1. Robert B. Parker's Fool's Paradise, G.P. Putnam (September 8, 2020) ISBN 978-0525542087
2. Robert B. Parker's Stone's Throw, G.P. Putnam (2021) ISBN 9780525542117
3. Robert B. Parker's Fallout, G.P. Putnam (2022) ISBN 9780593540275

By Christopher Farnsworth:

1. Robert B. Parker's Buried Secrets G.P. Putnam (February 4, 2025) ISBN 978-0593544778
2. Robert B. Parker's Big Shot (2026)

== Television adaptations ==
CBS (and later the Hallmark Channel) adapted the novels as a series of movie specials starring Tom Selleck in the title role; the first was aired in 2005 and the most recent in 2015. Robert Harmon has directed all but one of the films (Dick Lowry directed Jesse Stone: Innocents Lost), and Jeff Beal has provided original music. Select scores from the movies were released on a limited edition CD by Varèse Sarabande in 2009.

The films stay relatively true to storylines and character, with exceptions made mostly for television network viewing. With the fifth film, Selleck and Michael Brandman took over the screen writing, and took the films in new directions. The premise begins when the town council forced Jesse Stone out of his job as the Paradise Chief of Police. The council dubbed it "early retirement" and granted Stone a partial pension. As a retired police officer, Stone was implicitly granted the right to carry concealed firearms, without having a "concealed carry" permit.

Captain Healy hires Stone as an occasional "temporary consultant" to assist on certain state police investigations. Stone insists that he will get back his old job as chief. In the eighth film of the series, Stone is restored as the Chief of Police after the incumbent is murdered. The chairman of the town council asks Stone to return as Chief and catch the killer. Stone's dog plays an important supporting role in the series.

Tom Selleck plays the character as straight from the novels as possible; he is older (late fifties/early sixties vs. late thirties in the books) than Stone. The author, Robert B. Parker, said that he found the Jesse Stone films the most accurate television adaptations of his novels. On his blog, he wrote that "Tom nails the character".

The cast of the films has included the following regular characters:

- Kohl Sudduth as Officer Luther "Suitcase" Simpson.
- Kathy Baker as Officer Rose Gammon.
- Viola Davis as Officer Molly Crane. The character was replaced by Rose Gammon in Sea Change.
- Vito Rezza as Officer Anthony D'Angelo, a Paradise Police deputy. The character was written out of the series in Benefit of the Doubt.
- Stephen McHattie as Captain Healy, head of the Massachusetts State Police Homicide Division.
- William Devane as Dr. Dix, a former police officer turned therapist, whom Stone sees for help with his drinking and other personal issues.
- Saul Rubinek as Hastings "Hasty" Hathaway, former corrupt bank president and town council president who befriends Stone.
- William Sadler as Gino Fish, an organized crime boss who likes Stone, despite their being on opposite sides of the law. Gino sometimes assists Stone on cases with information.

A featured piece of music is Six Pieces for Piano, Op. 118 (Brahms) no.2.

=== Filmography ===
1. Jesse Stone: Stone Cold (February 20, 2005)
2. Jesse Stone: Night Passage (January 15, 2006) a prequel to Stone Cold
3. Jesse Stone: Death in Paradise (April 30, 2006)
4. Jesse Stone: Sea Change (May 22, 2007)
5. Jesse Stone: Thin Ice (March 1, 2009)
6. Jesse Stone: No Remorse (May 9, 2010)
7. Jesse Stone: Innocents Lost (May 22, 2011)
8. Jesse Stone: Benefit of the Doubt (May 20, 2012)
9. Jesse Stone: Lost in Paradise (October 18, 2015)

== Characters ==
- A dark grey cell indicates the character was not in the film.

Character	Film								
Character	Stone Cold	Night Passage	Death in Paradise	Sea Change	Thin Ice	No Remorse	Innocents Lost	Benefit of the Doubt	Lost in Paradise
Jesse Stone	Tom Selleck	Tom Selleck	Tom Selleck	Tom Selleck	Tom Selleck	Tom Selleck	Tom Selleck	Tom Selleck	Tom Selleck
"Suitcase" Simpson	Kohl Sudduth	Kohl Sudduth	Kohl Sudduth	Kohl Sudduth	Kohl Sudduth	Kohl Sudduth	Kohl Sudduth	Kohl Sudduth	Kohl Sudduth
Captain Healy	Stephen McHattie	Stephen McHattie	Stephen McHattie	Stephen McHattie	Stephen McHattie	Stephen McHattie	Stephen McHattie	Stephen McHattie	
Molly Crane	Viola Davis	Viola Davis	Viola Davis	Viola Davis					
Anthony D'Angelo	Vito Rezza	Vito Rezza	Vito Rezza	Vito Rezza				Vito Rezza	
Dr. Perkins	John Beale	John Beale	John Beale	John Beale	John Beale			John Beale	
Carter Hansen	Jeremy Ackerman			Jeremy Ackerman	Jeremy Ackerman	Jeremy Ackerman	Jeremy Ackerman	Jeremy Ackerman	
Comden	Tom Gallant			Tom Gallant	Tom Gallant	Tom Gallant			
Jenn	Sylvia Villagran	Gil Anderson	Gil Anderson	Gil Anderson	Gil Anderson	Gil Anderson	Gil Anderson		Gil Anderson
Reggie	Joe the Dog		Joe the Dog	Joe the Dog	Joe the Dog	Joe the Dog	Joe the Dog	Joe the Dog	
Abby Taylor	Polly Shannon	Polly Shannon							
H. Henry Uppman	David Christoffel		David Christoffel					David Christoffel	
Hasty Hathaway		Saul Rubinek		Saul Rubinek		Saul Rubinek	Saul Rubinek	Saul Rubinek	
Cissy Hathaway		Stephanie March				Krista Allen			
Carol Genest		Liisa Repo-Martel	Liisa Repo-Martel						
Dr. Dix			William Devane	William Devane	William Devane	William Devane	William Devane	William Devane	William Devane
Sister Mary John			Kerri Smith		Kerri Smith	Kerri Smith	Kerri Smith		Kerri Smith
Emily Bishop			Mae Whitman			Mae Whitman			
Rose Gammon				Kathy Baker	Kathy Baker	Kathy Baker	Kathy Baker	Kathy Baker	
Gino Fish				William Sadler	William Sadler	William Sadler	William Sadler	William Sadler	William Sadler
Alan Garner				Todd Hofley	Todd Hofley	Todd Hofley			
Laura				Laura Kohoot			Laura Kohoot		Laura Kohoot
William Butler					Gary Levert		Jeff Geddis	Jeff Geddis	
Sydney Greenstreet					Leslie Hope				Leslie Hope
Steven						Christopher Killam	Christopher Killam	Christopher Killam	
Thelma Gleffey							Gloria Reuben	Gloria Reuben	Gloria Reuben
Amanda							Christine Tizzard	Christine Tizzard	Christine Tizzard
Steve									Ned the Dog

=== Hiatus and relaunch ===
Although Jesse Stone: Benefit of the Doubt attracted nearly 13 million viewers when CBS aired it on May 20, 2012, producer Michael Brandman told Variety a few days later that he and Tom Selleck had been notified that CBS would not be ordering any more episodes. They said the film attracted older viewers, and CBS is moving away from movies and specials in favor of shorter duration TV series. Selleck noted that the movies were expensive to produce, and he had his own money invested in the last few. Selleck said he was not finished with the Stone character. When interviewed by NBC's "Popcornbiz" in August 2012, he said,

Well, right now CBS hasn't ordered another one. That's nothing new. They always seem to order them one at a time even though we kind of hit home runs, which is frustrating. So I'm not sure whether this is the last 'Jesse' or not. I don't think it will be, because there are so many other markets, cable and everything, that I think would want the series.

On March 4, 2015, Hallmark Mysteries & Movies announced it had picked up a ninth film. Selleck himself indicated he was grateful to Hallmark, however he had to produce the movie with $1 million less budget than what CBS provided for the last film done for the network. Only Selleck, Kohl Sudduth, William Devane, and William Sadler returned for the ninth film, with the balance of the cast being new characters. The movie, Jesse Stone: Lost in Paradise, aired on October 18, 2015. A tenth film was under consideration in 2017 and 2022.

In an October 2024 interview on the ending of Blue Bloods, TVInsider asked, "What’s next for Tom Selleck? A final Jesse Stone movie, perhaps?" To which he replied,

It looks like now I might have to write [a script for another movie]. It wouldn’t be a final one because everybody loves it. Jesse is a great character, and it would be fascinating to find out where he is quite a few years later.
