= The Image (1990 film) =

- Genre: Drama
- Written by: Brian Rehak
- Directed by: Peter Werner
- Starring: Albert Finney; John Mahoney; Kathy Baker; Swoosie Kurtz; Marsha Mason; Spalding Gray
- Theme music composer: James Newton Howard
- Country of origin: United States
- Original language: English

Production
- Producers: Steven R. McGlothen; Ron Roth
- Cinematography: Neil Roach
- Editor: Steven Cohen
- Running time: 89 minutes
- Production companies: Citadel Entertainment; HBO Pictures

Original release
- Network: HBO
- Release: January 27, 1990

The Image is a 1990 American made-for-television drama film directed by Peter Werner and written by Brian Rehak. The film stars Albert Finney, John Mahoney, Kathy Baker, Swoosie Kurtz, Marsha Mason and Spalding Gray. The film premiered on HBO on January 27, 1990. It was nominated for two Primetime Emmy Awards, Outstanding Lead Actor in a Miniseries or a Special for Finney and Outstanding Supporting Actress in a Miniseries or a Special for Kurtz.

== Plot ==
Jason Cromwell (Albert Finney) is a leading TV newsman whose investigation of a bank scandal drives a wrongly accused executive to suicide and forces him to make important decisions about his life and career.

== Cast ==
- Albert Finney as Jason Cromwell
- John Mahoney as Irving "Irv" Mickelson
- Kathy Baker as Marcie Guilford
- Swoosie Kurtz as Joanne Winstow-Darvish
- Marsha Mason as Jean Cromwell
- Spalding Gray as Frank Goodrich
- Wendie Jo Sperber as Anita Cox
- David Clennon as Dr. Sigmond Grampton
- Brett Cullen as Malcolm Dundee
- Jim Haynie as David Hartzfield
- Robert Schenkkan as Wilton Hale
- Nicholas Cascone as Sid Stillwell
- Beth Grant as Martha Packard
- Banks Harper as Jean Hartzfield
- Brad Pitt as Steve Black
- Robert Aaron as Tom Packard
- Adilah Barnes as Nedra Scroggins
