= Kathy Baker =

American actress (born 1950)

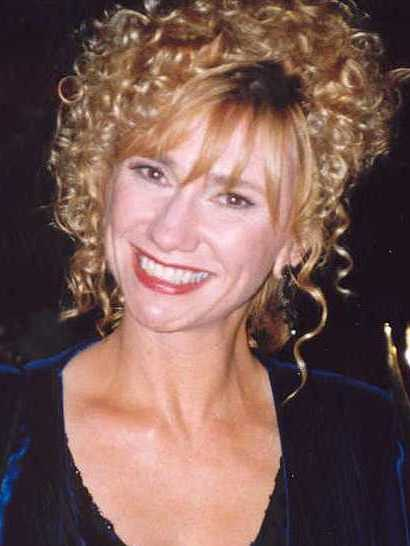
- Baker at the 45th Primetime Emmy Awards, 1993
- Born: Katherine Whitton Baker; June 8, 1950 (age 76); Midland, Texas, U.S.
- Education: Boston University; California Institute of the Arts; University of California, Berkeley (BA)
- Occupation: Actress
- Years active: 1983–present
- Spouses: Donald Camillieri (m. 1985; div. 1999) Steven Robman (m. 2003)
- Children: 2

Katherine Whitton Baker (born June 8, 1950) is an American actress. Baker began her career in theater and made her screen debut in the 1983 drama film The Right Stuff. She received the National Society of Film Critics Award for Best Supporting Actress and an Independent Spirit Award nomination for her performance in Street Smart (1987). Baker also has appeared in over 50 films, including Jacknife (1989), Edward Scissorhands (1990), The Cider House Rules (1999), Cold Mountain (2003), Nine Lives (2005), The Jane Austen Book Club (2007), Last Chance Harvey (2008), Take Shelter (2011), Saving Mr. Banks (2013), and The Age of Adaline (2015).

On television, Baker starred as Dr. Jill Brock in the CBS drama series Picket Fences (1992–1996), for which she received three Primetime Emmy Awards for Outstanding Lead Actress in a Drama and Golden Globe and Screen Actors Guild Awards. She later received three additional nominations and a Primetime Emmy Award for her performances in Touched by an Angel, Boston Public, and Door to Door.

== Early life ==
Baker was born in Midland, Texas, and raised a Quaker. She attended high school at Mills High School in Millbrae, California. She graduated in 1968. Her drama instructor, Allen Knight, was a major influence in her desire to become a professional actress. She attended the Boston University School of Fine Arts Acting program and studied acting at the California Institute of the Arts in the early 1970s. She later earned a B.A. degree in French in 1977 from UC Berkeley.

== Career ==
Baker began her acting career at San Francisco's Magic Theatre, performing in several of Sam Shepard's plays before getting her break in an off-Broadway production of Fool for Love (1983) opposite Ed Harris. She won an Obie Award for this role. In the same year she was cast as Louise Shepard, Alan Shepard's wife, in the drama film The Right Stuff. She later had dramatic performances as a prostitute in Street Smart (1987) and a recovering alcoholic and victim of domestic abuse in Clean and Sober (1988). For her performance in Street Smart, Baker has won National Society of Film Critics Award for Best Supporting Actress and Boston Society of Film Critics Award for Best Supporting Actress as well as an Independent Spirit Award for Best Supporting Female nomination. She later starred in films Dad, Jacknife and Edward Scissorhands.

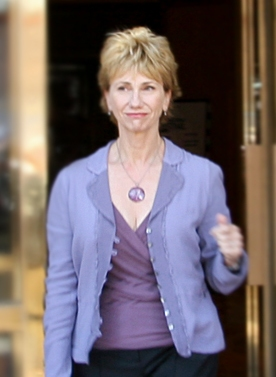
Baker at the 2007 Toronto International Film Festival

From 1992 to 1996, Baker starred as Jill Brock, a small-town doctor, in the CBS critically acclaimed drama series Picket Fences created by David E. Kelley. For her performance in the series she won the Primetime Emmy Award for Outstanding Lead Actress in a Drama Series three times: in 1993, 1995 and 1996, Golden Globe Award for Best Actress – Television Series Drama in 1994, and Screen Actors Guild Award for Outstanding Performance by a Female Actor in a Drama Series in 1995. She later appeared in David E. Kelley's dramas Ally McBeal, The Practice and had the recurring role as Meredith Peters in Boston Public, for which she was nominated for a Primetime Emmy Award for Outstanding Guest Actress in a Drama Series in 2001. Baker also received Emmy Award nominations for her guest performance in Touched by an Angel and in the category Outstanding Supporting Actress in a Miniseries or a Movie for Door to Door.

Baker has appeared in over 50 theatrical films in supporting and leading roles. She starred in two movies directed by Rodrigo García: Things You Can Tell Just by Looking at Her (2000) and Nine Lives (2005). Her other major credits include The Cider House Rules (1999), Cold Mountain (2003), 13 Going on 30 (2004), The Jane Austen Book Club (2007), Last Chance Harvey (2008), Take Shelter (2011) and Saving Mr. Banks (2013). She starred opposite Tom Selleck in the Jesse Stone made-for-TV film series in the 2000s. Also on television she guest-starred on Nip/Tuck, Law & Order: Special Victims Unit, Grey's Anatomy, and Medium. She also starred in the short-lived Lifetime drama series Against the Wall in 2011.

In 2014, it was announced that she was cast in Randall Miller's Midnight Rider, a biopic of Gregg Allman of the Allman Brothers Band. Baker also appears in the Netflix series The Ranch along with Ashton Kutcher and Elisha Cuthbert.

== Personal life ==
Baker has one son with her first husband, Donald Camillieri. Her second husband is Steven Robman. They live in South Pasadena, California.

== Filmography ==
=== Film ===
Year	Title	Role	Notes
1983	The Right Stuff	Louise Shepard	
1986	A Killing Affair	Maggie Gresham	
1987	Street Smart	Punchy	
1988	Permanent Record	Martha Sinclair	
1988	Clean and Sober	Charlie Standers	
1989	Dad	Annie	
1989	Jacknife	Martha Flannigan	
1990	The Image	Marcie Guilford	
1990	Edward Scissorhands	Joyce	
1990	Mister Frost	Dr. Sarah Day	
1992	Article 99	Dr. Diana Walton	
1992	Jennifer 8	Margie Ross	
1993	Mad Dog and Glory	Lee	
1996	To Gillian on Her 37th Birthday	Esther Wheeler	
1997	Inventing the Abbotts	Helen Holt	
1997	Weapons of Mass Distraction	Margo Powers	
1999	The Cider House Rules	Nurse Angela	
1999	A Little Inside	Nancy	
2000	Things You Can Tell Just by Looking at Her	Rose	
2001	The Glass House	Nancy Ryan	
2001	Ten Tiny Love Stories	Ten	
2002	Assassination Tango	Maggie	
2003	Cold Mountain	Sally Swanger	
2004	13 Going on 30	Bev Rink	
2005	Nine Lives	Camille	
2006	All the King's Men	Mrs. Burden	
2007	The Jane Austen Book Club	Bernadette	
2008	Last Chance Harvey	Jean	
2008	Shades of Ray	Janet Rehman	
2010	Miss Nobody	Claire McKinney	
2011	Take Shelter	Sarah	
2011	Good Day for It	Rose Carter	
2011	Seven Days in Utopia	Mabel	
2011	Machine Gun Preacher	Daisy	
2012	Big Miracle	Ruth McGraw	
2013	Saving Mr. Banks	Tommie	
2013	The Trials of Cate McCall	Therapist	
2014	Return to Zero	Kathleen Callaghan	
2014	Boulevard	Joy Mack	
2014	Model Home	Brenda	
2015	The Age of Adaline	Kathy Jones	
2015	The Party Is Over	Appoline	
2017	The Ballad of Lefty Brown	Laura Johnson	
2019	The Art of Racing in the Rain	Trish	
2020	Love Is Love Is Love	Diana	
2026	Remarkably Bright Creatures	Mary Ann Minetti	

=== Television ===
Year	Title	Role	Notes
1986	Nobody's Child	Lucy Stavros	Television film (CBS)
1987	Amazing Stories	Charlene 'Charlie' Benton	Episode: "Lane Change"
1987	Mariah	Ariel Serra	Episode: "Prey"
1990	The Image	Marcie Guilford	Television film (HBO)
1991	One Special Victory	Ellen	Television film (NBC)
1992–1996	Picket Fences	Dr. Jill Brock	87 episodes
1993	Lush Life	Janice Oliver	Television film (Showtime)
1997	Ally McBeal	Katherine Dawson	Episode: "The Affair"
1997	Not in This Town	Tammy Schnitzer	Television film (USA Network)
1998	The Practice	Evelyn Mayfield	2 episodes
1998	Oklahoma City: A Survivor's Story	Priscilla Salyers	Television film (Lifetime Network)
1999	Hey Arnold!	Dr. Bliss (voice)	Episode: "Helga on the Couch"
1999	A Season for Miracles	Ruth Doyle	Television film (Hallmark Hall of Fame)
1999	Shake, Rattle and Roll: An American Love Story	Janice Danner	Television film (CBS)
2000	Touched by an Angel	Ellen Sawyer	Episode: "Buy Me a Rose"
2000	Chicago Hope	Mary Wyzinski	Episode: "Everybody's Special at Chicago Hope"
2000	Ratz	Doris Trowbridge	Television film (Showtime)
2001–2002	Boston Public	Meredith Peters	14 episodes
2002	Door to Door	Gladys Sullivan	Television film (TNT)
2004	Monk	Sylvia Fairbourn	Episode: "Mr. Monk Goes to Jail"
2005	Nip/Tuck	Gail Pollack	2 episodes
2005	Spring Break Shark Attack	Mary Jones	Television film (CBS)
2005–2010	Medium	Marjorie Dubois	5 episodes
2007	Law & Order: Special Victims Unit	Hannah Curtis	Episode: "Sin"
2007	Gilmore Girls	Mia	Episode: "Gilmore Girls Only"
2007	Jesse Stone: Sea Change	Rose Gammon	Television film (CBS)
2008	Grey's Anatomy	Anna Loomis	2 episodes
2009	Unstable	Betty Walker	Television film (Lifetime)
2009	Jesse Stone: Thin Ice	Rose Gammon	Television film (CBS)
2009	Law & Order: Criminal Intent	Camille Hayes-Fitzgerald	Episode: "Playing Dead"
2010	Law & Order	Camille Peterson	Episode: "Crashers"
2010	Jesse Stone: No Remorse	Rose Gammon	Television film (CBS)
2011	Against the Wall	Sheila Kowalski	12 episodes
2011	Criminal Minds	Linda Collins	Episode: "A Family Affair"
2011	Jesse Stone: Innocents Lost	Rose Gammon	Television film (CBS)
2011	Too Big to Fail	Wendy Paulson	Television film (HBO)
2012	Private Practice	Dianne	Episode: "I'm Fine"
2012	Jesse Stone: Benefit of the Doubt	Rose Gammon	Television film (CBS)
2014	Those Who Kill	Marie Burgess	5 episodes
2015	Big Time in Hollywood, FL	Diana	8 episodes
2016	Colony	Phyllis	Recurring role, 3 episodes
2016	Sister Cities	Janis	Television film (Lifetime)
2016–2020	The Ranch	Joanne	Recurring role, 46 episodes
2017	I'm Sorry	Sharon	6 episodes
2018	Love	Vicki	2 episodes
2018	Paterno	Sue Paterno	Television film (HBO)
2019	Chicago Med	Nancy Geddes	Episode: "Never Going Back to Normal"
2024	Teacup	Ellen Chenoweth	7 episodes
2024	Orphan Black: Echoes	Melissa Miller	2 Episodes

== Awards and nominations ==
Year	Award	Category	Work	Result
1984	Obie Award	Best Performance by an Actress	Fool for Love	Won
1984	Theatre World Award	Theatre World Award	Fool for Love	Won
1988	Boston Society of Film Critics Award	Best Supporting Actress	Street Smart	Won
1988	Independent Spirit Award	Best Supporting Female	Street Smart	Nominated
1988	National Society of Film Critics Award	Best Supporting Actress	Street Smart	Won
1993	Primetime Emmy Award	Outstanding Lead Actress in a Drama Series	Picket Fences	Won
1994	Golden Globe Award	Best Actress – Television Series Drama	Picket Fences	Won
1994	Primetime Emmy Award	Outstanding Lead Actress in a Drama Series	Picket Fences	Nominated
1994	Viewers for Quality Television	Best Actress in a Quality Drama Series	Picket Fences	Won
1995	Golden Globe Award	Best Actress – Television Series Drama	Picket Fences	Nominated
1995	Primetime Emmy Award	Outstanding Lead Actress in a Drama Series	Picket Fences	Won
1995	Screen Actors Guild Award	Outstanding Performance by a Female Actor in a Drama Series	Picket Fences	Won
1995	Screen Actors Guild Award	Outstanding Performance by an Ensemble in a Drama Series	Picket Fences	Nominated
1995	Viewers for Quality Television	Best Actress in a Quality Drama Series	Picket Fences	Won
1996	Golden Globe Award	Best Actress – Television Series Drama	Picket Fences	Nominated
1996	Primetime Emmy Award	Outstanding Lead Actress in a Drama Series	Picket Fences	Won
1996	Screen Actors Guild Award	Outstanding Performance by an Ensemble in a Drama Series	Picket Fences	Nominated
2000	Primetime Emmy Award	Outstanding Guest Actress in a Drama Series	Touched by an Angel	Nominated
2000	Screen Actors Guild Award	Outstanding Performance by a Cast in a Motion Picture	The Cider House Rules	Nominated
2001	Primetime Emmy Award	Outstanding Guest Actress in a Drama Series	Boston Public	Nominated
2003	Primetime Emmy Award	Outstanding Supporting Actress in a Miniseries or a Movie	Door to Door	Nominated
2005	Gotham Awards	Best Ensemble Cast	Nine Lives	Nominated
2005	Locarno International Film Festival	Best Actress	Nine Lives	Won
2011	Gotham Awards	Best Ensemble Cast	Take Shelter	Nominated
2013	Phoenix Film Critics Society Award	Best Cast	Saving Mr. Banks	Nominated
