= Viewers for Quality Television =

American nonprofit organization

Viewers for Quality Television (also called "VQT") was an American nonprofit organization (under 501(c)(3)) founded in 1984 to advocate network television series that members of the organization voted to be of the "highest quality." The group's goal was to rescue "...critically acclaimed programs from cancellation despite their Nielsen program rating." It was a participatory organization that was open to all interested viewers. The organization was dissolved in late 2000 due to financial problems.

== History ==
The group's founder Dorothy Swanson started VQT to save the television show Cagney and Lacey from cancellation. The VQT presented an award each year called the "Q" Award, based on the votes of its members. Actors were nominated based on the group's judgement of the "quality" of the acting. Other programs supported by the group included St. Elsewhere, Designing Women, Frank's Place, Quantum Leap, Sports Night, and Party of Five.

== Aftermath ==
Swanson dissolved VQT in 2000 after the organization's membership dropped to 1,000 members (down from a peak of 5,000 members), which reduced the funding for the organization. With the low membership and lack of funding, VQT was not able to put on its annual "Q" awards ceremony in Los Angeles. Swanson claims that she disbanded the organization to avoid the danger of "... the organization becom[ing] a shadow of its former self, whether under my direction or somebody else's."

They became the subject of the 2018 documentary United We Fan.

== List of Q Awards winners ==
Best Quality Drama Series:

- 1985: Cagney & Lacey
- 1986: Cagney & Lacey
- 1987: Cagney & Lacey
- 1988: Cagney & Lacey
- 1989: China Beach
- 1990: China Beach
- 1991: China Beach
- 1992: I'll Fly Away
- 1993: I'll Fly Away
- 1994: NYPD Blue
- 1995: Picket Fences
- 1996: Homicide: Life on the Street
- 1997: ER
- 1998: The Practice
- 1999: The Practice
- 2000: The West Wing

Best Quality Comedy Series:

- 1985: The Cosby Show
- 1986: The Cosby Show
- 1987: Designing Women
- 1988: Designing Women
- 1989: Designing Women
- 1990: Designing Women
- 1991: Murphy Brown
- 1992: Brooklyn Bridge
- 1993: Brooklyn Bridge
- 1994: Mad About You
- 1995: Frasier
- 1996: Frasier
- 1997: Frasier
- 1998: Ally McBeal
- 1999: Everybody Loves Raymond
- 2000: Everybody Loves Raymond

Best Actor in a Quality Drama Series:

- 1985: Daniel J. Travanti – Hill Street Blues
- 1986: William Daniels – St. Elsewhere
- 1987: William Daniels – St. Elsewhere
- 1988: Ron Perlman – Beauty and the Beast
- 1989: Ron Perlman – Beauty and the Beast
- 1990: Scott Bakula – Quantum Leap
- 1991: Scott Bakula – Quantum Leap
- 1992: Scott Bakula – Quantum Leap
- 1993: Scott Bakula – Quantum Leap
- 1994: Dennis Franz – NYPD Blue
- 1995: Andre Braugher – Homicide: Life on the Street
- 1996: Dennis Franz – NYPD Blue
- 1997: Dennis Franz – NYPD Blue
- 1998: Dennis Franz – NYPD Blue
- 1999: Dennis Franz – NYPD Blue
- 2000: Martin Sheen – The West Wing

Best Actor in a Quality Comedy Series:

- 1985: Bill Cosby – The Cosby Show
- 1986: Bill Cosby – The Cosby Show
- 1987: Michael J. Fox – Family Ties / Bob Newhart – Newhart
- 1988: Tim Reid – Frank's Place
- 1989: Fred Savage – The Wonder Years
- 1990: Fred Savage – The Wonder Years
- 1991: Burt Reynolds – Evening Shade
- 1992: John Goodman – Roseanne
- 1993: Jerry Seinfeld – Seinfeld
- 1994: Paul Reiser – Mad About You
- 1995: Kelsey Grammer – Frasier
- 1996: Kelsey Grammer – Frasier
- 1997: Kelsey Grammer – Frasier
- 1998: Kelsey Grammer – Frasier
- 1999: Ray Romano – Everybody Loves Raymond
- 2000: Ray Romano – Everybody Loves Raymond

Best Actress in a Quality Drama Series:

- 1985: Sharon Gless – Cagney & Lacey
- 1986: Sharon Gless – Cagney & Lacey
- 1987: Sharon Gless – Cagney & Lacey
- 1988: Sharon Gless – Cagney & Lacey
- 1989: Dana Delany – China Beach
- 1990: Dana Delany – China Beach
- 1991: Dana Delany – China Beach
- 1992: Regina Taylor – I'll Fly Away
- 1993: Regina Taylor – I'll Fly Away
- 1994: Kathy Baker – Picket Fences
- 1995: Kathy Baker – Picket Fences
- 1996: Sherry Stringfield – ER
- 1997: Julianna Margulies – ER
- 1998: Gillian Anderson – The X-Files
- 1999: Gillian Anderson – The X-Files
- 2000: Sela Ward – Once and Again

Best Actress in a Quality Comedy Series:

- 1985: Shelley Long – Cheers
- 1986: Shelley Long – Cheers
- 1987: Betty White – The Golden Girls
- 1988: Betty White – The Golden Girls
- 1989: Candice Bergen – Murphy Brown
- 1990: Candice Bergen – Murphy Brown
- 1991: Candice Bergen – Murphy Brown
- 1992: Marion Ross – Brooklyn Bridge
- 1993: Marion Ross – Brooklyn Bridge
- 1994: Helen Hunt – Mad About You
- 1995: Brett Butler – Grace Under Fire
- 1996: Helen Hunt – Mad About You
- 1997: Helen Hunt – Mad About You
- 1998: Calista Flockhart – Ally McBeal
- 1999: Patricia Heaton – Everybody Loves Raymond
- 2000: Patricia Heaton – Everybody Loves Raymond

Best Supporting Actor in a Quality Drama Series:

- 1985: Bruce Weitz – Hill Street Blues
- 1986: John Karlen – Cagney & Lacey
- 1987: John Karlen – Cagney & Lacey
- 1988: Larry Drake – L.A. Law
- 1989: Larry Drake – L.A. Law
- 1990: Jimmy Smits – L.A. Law
- 1991: Dean Stockwell – Quantum Leap
- 1992: John Cullum – Northern Exposure
- 1993: Chad Lowe – Life Goes On
- 1994: Fyvush Finkel – Picket Fences
- 1995: Peter MacNicol – Chicago Hope
- 1996: Stanley Tucci – Murder One
- 1997: Noah Wyle – ER
- 1998: Steve Harris – The Practice
- 1999: Steve Harris – The Practice
- 2000: John Spencer – The West Wing

Best Supporting Actor in a Quality Comedy Series:

- 1985: Nicholas Colasanto – Cheers
- 1986: Michael J. Fox – Family Ties
- 1987: Peter Scolari – Newhart
- 1988: Meshach Taylor – Designing Women
- 1989: Meshach Taylor – Designing Women
- 1990: Meshach Taylor – Designing Women
- 1991: Michael Jeter – Evening Shade
- 1992: Michael Jeter – Evening Shade
- 1993: Michael Jeter – Evening Shade
- 1994: David Hyde Pierce – Frasier
- 1995: David Hyde Pierce – Frasier
- 1996: David Hyde Pierce – Frasier
- 1997: David Hyde Pierce – Frasier
- 1998: David Hyde Pierce – Frasier
- 1999: Peter MacNicol – Ally McBeal
- 2000: David Hyde Pierce – Frasier

Best Supporting Actress in a Quality Drama Series:

- 1985: Veronica Hamel – Hill Street Blues
- 1986: Betty Thomas – Hill Street Blues
- 1987: Bonnie Bartlett – St. Elsewhere
- 1988: Susan Ruttan – L.A. Law
- 1989: Marg Helgenberger – China Beach
- 1990: Marg Helgenberger – China Beach
- 1991: Marg Helgenberger – China Beach
- 1992: Kellie Martin – Life Goes On
- 1993: Kay Lenz – Reasonable Doubts
- 1994: Lauren Holly – Picket Fences
- 1995: Julianna Margulies – ER
- 1996: Barbara Bosson – Murder One
- 1997: Gloria Reuben – ER
- 1998: Gloria Reuben – ER
- 1999: Camryn Manheim – The Practice
- 2000: Tyne Daly – Judging Amy

Best Supporting Actress in a Quality Comedy Series:

- 1985: Rhea Perlman – Cheers
- 1986: Julia Duffy – Newhart
- 1987: Julia Duffy – Newhart
- 1988: Julia Duffy – Newhart
- 1989: Park Overall – Empty Nest
- 1990: Park Overall – Empty Nest
- 1991: Park Overall – Empty Nest
- 1992: Julia Louis-Dreyfus – Seinfeld
- 1993: Julia Louis-Dreyfus – Seinfeld
- 1994: Julia Louis-Dreyfus – Seinfeld
- 1995: Jane Leeves – Frasier
- 1996: Christine Baranski – Cybill
- 1997: Julia Louis-Dreyfus – Seinfeld
- 1998: Doris Roberts – Everybody Loves Raymond
- 1999: Doris Roberts – Everybody Loves Raymond
- 2000: Doris Roberts – Everybody Loves Raymond

Best Recurring Player:

- 1991: Alice Ghostley – Designing Women
- 1992: Adam Arkin – Northern Exposure
- 1993: Ray Walston – Picket Fences
- 1994: Scott Bakula – Murphy Brown
- 1995: Kathleen Wilhoite – ER
- 1996: Amy Aquino – Picket Fences
- 1997: Pruitt Taylor Vince – Murder One
- 1998: John Larroquette – The Practice

Network Commitment to Quality Award:

- 1996: NBC
- 1997: NBC
- 1998: Fox

Founder's Award:

- 1988: Ray Sharkey – Wiseguy
- 1989: Terence Knox – Tour of Duty
- 1990: Kenneth Johnson – Alien Nation
- 1991: Robert Picardo – China Beach
- 1992: Life Goes On
- 1993: Homefront
- 1994: South Central
- 1995: Homicide: Life on the Street
- 1996: Bonnie Hunt – Bonnie
- 1997: Paul Haggis – EZ Streets
- 1998: Nothing Sacred
- 1999: Will & Grace
- 2000: Buffy the Vampire Slayer

== See also ==
- Quality television – a term used by television scholars, television critics, and broadcasting advocacy groups to describe a genre or style of television programming that they subjectively argue is of higher quality, due to its subject matter or content.
- Peabody Awards
