= Kohl Sudduth =

American actor (born 1974)

- Born: Walter Kohl Sudduth; August 8, 1974 (age 52); Granada Hills, California, USA
- Occupations: Actor, musician
- Years active: 1995-2015
- Relatives: Skipp Sudduth (brother)

Walter Kohl Sudduth (born August 8, 1974) is an American actor. He is best known for his role as Luther "Suitcase" Simpson in nine Jesse Stone television films.

== Early life and education ==
Walter Kohl Sudduth was born August 8, 1974, in Granada Hills, Los Angeles, the younger brother of actor Skipp Sudduth. He was raised in the small town of Circleville, Ohio. Sudduth acted in several high school plays, including Cheaper by the Dozen and Flowers for Algernon, before attending Ohio University, where he focused his energies on music. During his college years, Sudduth was the guitarist and vocalist of Edison, a punk rock band that played throughout the American Midwest. He graduated in 1995 with a BA in English.

== Career ==
In 1995, Sudduth moved to New York City to pursue a professional acting career. He appeared regularly at improv comedy clubs and theaters such as the Red Room to hone his comedy skills. Sudduth made his film debut in director John Turturro's Illuminata (1997) playing Christopher Walken's concubine. The following year he appeared in two films, 54 (1998) as Rhett and Rounders (1998) as Wagner with Edward Norton and Matt Damon.

Sudduth's breakthrough role came in 1999 with Bowfinger (1999) playing Slater, an aspiring actor, opposite Eddie Murphy, Steve Martin and Heather Graham. The role introduced Sudduth to a broader audience through his portrayal of a slacker actor. In 2000, Sudduth appeared in two films, the teen comedy Road Trip (2000) as Mark and the Masterpiece Theater production Cora Unashamed (2000), based on the Langston Hughes short story, as Joe.

Throughout this period, Sudduth also appeared in several television series, including one episode of All My Children (1997) as Rick the waiter, one episode of Sex and the City (1998) as Kim Cattrall's love interest Jon, one episode of Law & Order: Special Victims Unit (1999) as Riley Couger and 17 episodes of Grosse Pointe (2000–2001) as Quentin King and Stone Anders.

Sudduth is best known for his role as Luther "Suitcase" Simpson co-starring opposite Tom Selleck in nine Jesse Stone television films (2005–2015). He plays bass in his brother Skipp's rock band Minus Ted. He enjoys rock climbing and playing basketball while dividing his time between New York City and Los Angeles, California.

== Filmography ==
- All My Children (1997), Rick
- Dating Games (1998), Prince Charming
- Illuminata (1998), Concubine #1
- Sex and the City (1998, TV series), Jon, 1 episode
- 54 (1998), Rhett
- Rounders (1998), Wagner
- Bowfinger (1999), Slater
- Law & Order: Special Victims Unit (1999, TV series), Riley Couger, 1 episode
- Table One (2000), Freddie
- Road Trip (2000), Mark
- Cora Unashamed (2000, TV movie), Joe
- Grosse Pointe (2000–2001, TV series), Quentin King / Stone Anders, 17 episodes
- The Banger Sisters (2002), Hotel Clerk
- Stone Cold (2005, TV movie), Luther "Suitcase" Simpson
- The Notorious Bettie Page (2005), Police Officer
- Jesse Stone: Night Passage (2006, TV movie), Luther "Suitcase" Simpson
- Jesse Stone: Death in Paradise (2006, TV movie), Luther "Suitcase" Simpson
- Law & Order: Criminal Intent (TV series, 2006), Zach, 1 episode
- Jesse Stone: Sea Change (2007, TV movie), Luther "Suitcase" Simpson
- Jesse Stone: Thin Ice (2009, TV movie), Luther "Suitcase" Simpson
- Jesse Stone: No Remorse (2010, TV movie), Luther "Suitcase" Simpson
- Jesse Stone: Innocents Lost (2011, TV movie), Luther "Suitcase" Simpson
- Jesse Stone: Benefit of the Doubt (2012, TV movie), Luther "Suitcase" Simpson
- Blue Bloods (2015, TV series), Sam Holbrooke, 1 episode
- Jesse Stone: Lost in Paradise (2015, TV movie), officer Luther "Suitcase" Simpson
