= Polly Shannon =

Canadian actress (born 1973)

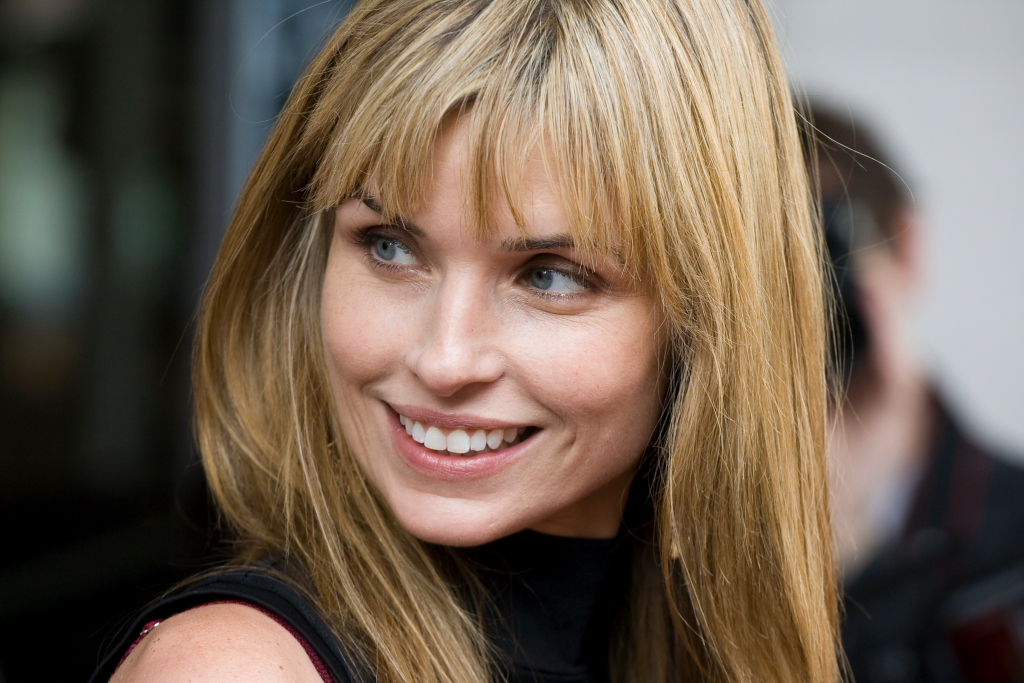
- Polly Shannon at TIFF, 2010
- Born: Polly Erin Shannon; September 1, 1973 (age 52); Kingston, Ontario, Canada
- Occupation: Actress
- Years active: 1992–present
- Spouse: Christopher Dyson (m. 2013)
- Children: 2

Polly Shannon (born September 1, 1973) is a Canadian actress. She is best known for her portrayal of Margaret Trudeau in the 2002 miniseries Trudeau, a film about the Prime Minister of Canada Pierre Trudeau.

== Biography ==
Polly Shannon was born September 1, 1973, in Kingston, Ontario, and raised in Aylmer, Quebec. Her father, Michael Shannon, is a doctor who served in various senior posts at Health Canada, including director general for the Laboratory Centre for Disease Control. Her mother, Mary Mackay-Smith, is a screenwriter for children's films and television. At age 13, after acting in theatre as a child, Shannon became a model, with assignments that took her to New York, London, and Tokyo. She attended Philemon Wright High School in Hull, Quebec.

In 1992, Shannon began her television career, landing a part in Catwalk, a YTV series about a struggling rock band. She went on to appear in several television series, including Sirens (1994) as Kelly Van Pelt, Ready or Not (1996) as Angelique, Side Effects (1996) as Lisa Burns, and the Canadian horror series The Hunger (1999) as Jen.

In 2002, Shannon appeared in the popular comedy film Men with Brooms in the role of Joanne. Her most notable role was playing Margaret Trudeau in the 2002 miniseries Trudeau, a film about the late Prime Minister of Canada Pierre Trudeau. "Playing Maggie was a really thrilling experience," Shannon noted at the time. "It was a challenge that was different from anything else I've done."

Shannon starred opposite Tom Selleck as his girlfriend Abby Taylor in two Jesse Stone television films, Stone Cold (2005) and Jesse Stone: Night Passage (2006).

== Filmography ==
=== Films ===
- Love and Human Remains (1993), The Second Victim
- A Young Connecticut Yankee in King Arthur's Court (1995), Alisande/Alexandra
- End of Summer (1995, TV movie), Maid
- No Contest (1995), Candice 'Candy' Wilson, Miss U.S.A.
- Fight for Justice: The Nancy Conn Story (1995, TV movie), Carol
- Snowboard Academy (1996), Tori
- Devil's Food (1996, TV movie)
- Frankenstein and Me (1996), Elizabeth
- The Girl Next Door (1999, TV movie), Fiona Winters
- My Date with the President's Daughter (1998, TV movie), Cashier (uncredited)
- Dirty Work (1998), Toni-Ann
- The Sheldon Kennedy Story (1999, TV movie), Jana
- Daydream Believers: The Monkees' Story (2000, TV movie), Phyllis Nesmith
- The Stalking of Laurie Show (2000, TV movie), Christine
- Harvard Man (2001), Juliet
- The Triangle (2001, TV movie), Julia Lee
- Men with Brooms (2002), Joanne
- Trudeau (2002, TV movie), Margaret Trudeau
- TrueSexLies (2003, short), Jackie
- Do or Die (2003, TV movie), Ruth Hennessey
- Hard to Forget (2003, TV movie), Sandra/Nicky Applewhite
- Ham & Cheese (2004), Lucy
- Direct Action (2004), Billie Ross
- Stone Cold (2005, TV movie), Abby Taylor
- Lie with Me (2005), Victoria
- Jesse Stone: Night Passage (2006, TV movie), Abby Taylor
- Miranda & Gordon (2006, short), Mother
- Victor (2008, TV movie), Donna Clavel
- Hide (2008), Jenny
- Hydra (2009, TV movie), Dr. Valerie Cammon
- One Love (2009, short), Olivia
- Concrete Canyons (2010, TV movie), Det. Susan Kinkaid
- Defining Moments (2021 film) as Marina

=== Television series ===
- Are You Afraid of the Dark? (1992, "The Tale of the Pinball Wizard"), Sophie
- Catwalk (1992–1994), Nina Moore
- The Hidden Room (1993, "Marion & Jean"), Counter Girl
- Sirens (1994, "The Needle and the Damage Done"), Kelly Van Pelt
- Forever Knight (1995, "Trophy Girl"), Liselle
- No Greater Love (1996, TV movie), Helen Horowitz
- Ready or Not (1996, "Glamour Girl"), Angelique
- Side Effects (1996, "Behind the Scenes"), Lisa Burns
- A Young Connecticut Yankee in King Arthur's Court (1995), Alisande/Alexandra
- Due South (1997, "Seeing Is Believing"), Judy Cates
- Eerie, Indiana: The Other Dimension (1998, "Perfect", 1998), Esthetician
- Highlander: The Raven (1998, "Passion Play"), Young Lucy Becker
- Earth: Final Conflict (1999, "Between Heaven and Hell"), Dr. Joyce Belman
- The Outer Limits (1999, "The Human Operators"), Human Operator of Starfighter-88
- Psi Factor: Chronicles of the Paranormal (1999, "Sacrifices"), Moira Stratton
- The Hunger (1999, "Brass"), Jen
- Code Name: Eternity (2000, "The Long Drop"), Cinda
- Twice in a Lifetime (1999–2000, 2 episodes), Vicky Sue
- La Femme Nikita (2001, 3 episodes), Michelle
- Doc (2001, "You Gotta Have Heart")
- Leap Years (2001, 5 episodes), Valerie
- Jeremiah (2002, "Ring of Truth"), Polly
- Street Time (2002, 5 episodes), Danielle
- Sue Thomas: F.B.Eye (2002–2004, 5 episodes), Darcy D'Angelo
- Wild Card (2003, "Backstabbed"), Ilana
- Puppets Who Kill (2004, "Portrait of Buttons"), Rosa
- The Jane Show (2004, "Pilot"), Susan
- Cold Case (2006, "The Red and the Blue"), Honey Sugar
- CSI: Miami (2006, "Double Jeopardy"), Allison Grady
- Shattered (2010, 2 episodes), Naomi
- Rookie Blue (2011, "Might Have Been"), Tori
- Less Than Kind (2012, "I'm Still Me"), Leslie

== Awards and nominations ==
Year	Award	Category	Production	Result
1999	Gemini Award	Best Performance by an Actress in a Leading Role in a Dramatic Program or Mini-Series	The Girl Next Door	Nominated
2000	Gemini Award	Best Performance by an Actress in a Leading Role in a Dramatic Program or Mini-Series	The Sheldon Kennedy Story	Nominated
2003	Canadian Comedy Award	Film - Pretty Funny Female Performance	Men with Brooms	Nominated
2008	WorldFest Houston	Special Jury Award	Miranda & Gordon (shared with cast)	Won
