= Jesse Stone: Innocents Lost =

2011 American made-for-TV crime drama film directed by Dick Lowry

- DVD cover
- Genre: Crime film
- Based on: Characters created by Robert B. Parker
- Screenplay by: Tom Selleck; Michael Brandman
- Story by: Tom Selleck; Michael Brandman
- Directed by: Dick Lowry
- Starring: Tom Selleck; Kathy Baker; Kohl Sudduth
- Music by: Jeff Beal
- Country of origin: United States
- Original language: English

Production
- Producer: Steven J. Brandman
- Cinematography: David Gribble
- Editor: Steven Cohen
- Running time: 91 minutes
- Production companies: Brandman Productions; Sony Pictures Television

Original release
- Network: CBS
- Release: May 22, 2011

Jesse Stone: Innocents Lost is a 2011 American made-for-television crime drama film directed by Dick Lowry and starring Tom Selleck, Kathy Baker, and Kohl Sudduth. Based on the characters from the Jesse Stone novels created by Robert B. Parker, the film was written by Selleck, who plays Jesse Stone, and Michael Brandman. Stone is the retired police chief of a small New England town who investigates the suspicious death of a young friend while the police force deals with the arrogant new police chief who is the son-in-law of a town councilman. Filmed on location in Nova Scotia, the story is set in the fictitious town of Paradise, Massachusetts.

Jesse Stone: Innocents Lost is the seventh in a series of nine television films based on Jesse Stone and other characters of Parker's Jesse Stone novels. The film first aired on the CBS television network on May 22, 2011.

== Plot ==
After being replaced as the chief of police in Paradise, Massachusetts by the town council president's son-in-law, William Butler, Jesse Stone is still without a full-time job (though he vows to one day be reinstated). Nevertheless, he continues to find ways to pursue investigations into two separate murders: one involves a friend with whom he had lost contact, and the other has him working as a consulting investigator for the Massachusetts State Police Homicide Division on a case involving a robbery and murder suspect. Both Jesse and his friend, State Police Captain Healy, have doubts as to the robbery & murder suspect's guilt. All the while, Jesse deals with tensions between Butler, his problems with his ex-wife, and drinking issues are still present.

== Cast ==
- Tom Selleck as Jesse Stone
- Kathy Baker as Police Officer Rose Gammon
- Kohl Sudduth as Police Officer Luther "Suitcase" Simpson
- Gloria Reuben as Thelma Gleffey
- Stephen McHattie as Captain Healy, State Police Homicide Commander
- William Sadler as Gino Fish
- Mark Blum as Dr. Noble Parkinson
- Eileen Boylan as Cindy Van Alden
- Mike Erwin as Lewis Lipinsky
- Jeff Geddis as William Butler
- Rae Ritke as Jacqueline Van Aldan
- Kerri Smith as Sister Mary John
- Val Ovtcharov as Valery Siminov
- Stacey Smith as Administrator
- Saul Rubinek as Hasty Hathaway
- William Devane as Dr. Dix (Jesse's psychiatrist)
- Benjamin Charles Watson as Charles Morris
- Dylan Roberts as Public Defender
- Molly Dunsworth as Emily
- Christine Tizzard as Amanda
- Jeremy Akerman as Councilman Carter Hanson
- Joe the Dog as Reggie
- Gil Anderson as Jenn (voice)

== Production ==
Unlike the first four films in the Jesse Stone series, Jesse Stone: Innocents Lost is not based on one of Robert B. Parker's novels. The screenplay was written by Tom Selleck and Michael Brandman. This was their second collaboration on an original Jesse Stone screenplay. This is the only Jesse Stone movie not be directed by Robert Harmon.

== Filming locations ==
The Jesse Stone series was filmed on location in Nova Scotia. The city of Lunenburg doubles as the town of Paradise, while Boston scenes were shot in Halifax. Exterior shots of Jesse's house were filmed at Stonehurst East, Nova Scotia.
