= Night and Day (Parker novel) =

2009 novel by Robert B. Parker

- First edition
- Author: Robert B. Parker
- Language: English
- Series: Jesse Stone
- Genre: Crime novel
- Publisher: Putnam
- Publication date: 2009
- Publication place: United States
- Pages: 304
- ISBN: 978-0-399-15541-3
- Preceded by: Stranger in Paradise
- Followed by: Split Image

Night and Day is a crime novel by Robert B. Parker, the eighth in his Jesse Stone series. It was the last in the series to be published before his death in 2010.

== Plot summary ==
Night and Day begins with the investigation of a middle school principal accused of molestation. Several girls accuse Principal Betsy Ingersoll of making them pull their dresses up so she can see their panties. The principal claims that she did this to ensure they were wearing proper attire for the school dance. She also claims that her job is not only to ensure they get a proper education, but that they also grow into proper ladies and do not become sluts. She sends several girls home for wearing slutty panties. Although there is no crime to charge her with, Jesse determines to make trouble for her until he can find something to charge her with as he is convinced the girls’ civil rights were violated.

He begins interviewing the principal along with her high powered attorney husband, as well as the girls. Later one of the girls comes to see Jesse at his office. She tells him that her parents are swingers, and often host parties for that purpose at their home. She and her little brother hate it and she asks Jesse if he can help. With swinging not illegal, Jesse finds his hands tied, but decides to investigate anyway. He has Suit talk to two of the women, one of whom he knew in high school, to get more information on the swingers club. Suit discovers that the girl’s mother is not into it, but only does it because her husband wants to. Jesse has Spike threaten her husband about the swinging, and she later leaves him.

The main plot of the novel involves the investigation of the Night Hawk. The Night Hawk starts as a peeping tom, and the Paradise police get several calls about him. Later the Night Hawk escalates his voyeuristic attacks by breaking into homes while women are home alone, forcing them to undress at gunpoint, and then taking nude photos of them. He then begins writing Jesse detailing his exploits, and includes the nude photos. He writes that he cannot stop himself; he must discover these women’s “secret.” He also writes that he does not know what he will do next and fears that he will escalate further.

Jesse begins to combine his investigation of the swingers with his investigation of the Night Hawk. Since the Night Hawk never touches anyone, he questions the swingers to find out if there is anyone in their club that only likes to watch and never touch. The women in the club all identify Seth Ralston. Ralston is a professor of English at a nearby university. He is married to a young grad student who is working on her doctorate. Jesse discovers that Ralston's wife used to teach a Wednesday night class, which corresponds with all the peeping tom reports. He also discovers that the peeping tom reports stopped at the same time that Ralston’s wife quit her teaching job to begin doing her doctoral work full-time. Jesse questions Ralston’s wife about the swinging to see if she will inadvertently reveal something about her husband that will confirm he is the Night Hawk, and even hints to her that her husband may be the Night Hawk. She responds by belittling Jesse for being a dumb cop, and singling them out for their lifestyle.

Meanwhile, Jesse continues to pressure Betsy Ingersoll, who then reports that she is a victim of the Night Hawk. Soon after Jesse receives a nude photo of Betsy, however he and Molly become convinced that she is posing in the photo and suspect the attack was staged. The local media request an interview concerning the attack, and Jesse uncharacteristically agrees. He gives details of the attack and later receives a letter from the Night Hawk who demands that he never attacked Betsy Ingersoll. Jesse believes that the Night Hawk is telling the truth, as he has never denied an attack before, but always been honest about his attacks. Jesse confronts Betsy with this and she admits that she staged the attack. She says that she did it to get some attention from her husband, but that he did not even care. She was acting out because her husband cheats on her constantly with young women, which also explains her obsession with teenage girls not growing up to be sluts. Jesse agrees not to charge her with any crimes if she agrees to see Sunny Randall’s shrink, Dr. Silverman (the long-term love interest of another Parker character Spenser), which she does.

A few days later Seth Ralston’s wife comes to Jesse to report that her husband is missing. They begin searching for him, and soon after Jesse receives another letter from the Night Hawk blasting him for speaking with his wife, and ruining his life. He writes that he is going to leave town, but only after he discovers one more woman’s secret, as he calls it, and warns that this woman will be someone close to Jesse. Jesse thinks that he is trying to hint that the woman will be Betsy Ingersoll, but Jesse believes he is actually targeting Molly. They set a police unit in front of Betsy’s house as a decoy, but then stake out Molly’s house. Molly waits at home with a gun strapped to her thigh, and a wire so Jesse can hear her. The Night Hawk breaks in on her and forces her to begin stripping at gun point. Suit and Jesse then break in to arrest him. Surprised that they figured out he was after Molly, he raises his gun to shoot her, but Molly, Suit, and Jesse all shoot and kill Seth Ralston, putting an end to the Night Hawk. Suit is left with a moral dilemma that it was his shot that killed Ralston, but since all three fired, Jesse is able to defuse the situation by convincing Suit that it could have been any one of the three.

== Subplots ==
The main subplot involves the further deterioration of Jesse’s relationship with Jenn. Jenn takes a job on a syndicated news program in New York, and moves in with the producer in Manhattan. Jesse takes the news hard and begins drinking heavily again. He finally comes to the realization that Jenn only uses him when she needs him. Jesse begins seeing Sunny Randall again. Sunny is single again as Richie returned to his wife after their son was born. Realizing that Richie will never leave his son, Sunny finally believes the relationship is over. The novel ends with Sunny at Jesse’s apartment having drinks when Jenn calls. She gets up to leave, but Jesse asks her to stay as he wants her to hear the conversation. Jenn tells Jesse that her show was canceled, and she broke up with the producer. She asks if she can move back in with Jesse and tells him that she needs him. He tells her no and hangs up. Jesse and Sunny toast each other as the novel ends.

== Reception ==
The book was reviewed by Booklist, Kirkus Reviews, and Publishers Weekly.
