= Jesse Stone: Stone Cold =

2005 US television crime drama film by Robert Harmon

- DVD cover
- Also known as: Stone Cold
- Genre: Crime film
- Based on: Stone Cold by Robert B. Parker
- Screenplay by: John Fasano; Michael Brandman
- Directed by: Robert Harmon
- Starring: Tom Selleck; Jane Adams; Reg Rogers
- Music by: Jeff Beal
- Country of origin: United States
- Original language: English

Production
- Producer: Steven J. Brandman
- Cinematography: Rene Ohashi
- Editor: Armen Minasian
- Running time: 87 minutes
- Production companies: Brandman Productions; Sony Pictures Television

Original release
- Network: CBS
- Release: February 20, 2005

Stone Cold is a 2005 American made-for-television crime drama film directed by Robert Harmon and starring Tom Selleck, Jane Adams and Reg Rogers. Based on the 2003 novel Stone Cold by Robert B. Parker, the film is about the police chief of a small New England town who investigates a series of murders that occur with the same modus operandi. Filmed on location in Nova Scotia, the story is set in the fictitious town of Paradise, Massachusetts.

Stone Cold is the first in a series of nine television films based on Parker's Jesse Stone novels. The film first aired on the CBS television network February 20, 2005. Although it was broadcast first in the series of films, the events take place after those in the second film, Jesse Stone: Night Passage, which aired a year after this.

== Plot ==
Jesse Stone (Tom Selleck) is the police chief of Paradise, Massachusetts—a coastal town north of Boston. A former homicide detective in Los Angeles, Jesse was fired from the LAPD because of a drinking problem. He was hired for the Paradise position by the president of the town council.

On a November night, a body is discovered on a rocky shoreline by Jesse's deputy, Officer Luther "Suitcase" Simpson (Kohl Sudduth). With no suspect, motive, or weapon, Jesse begins his investigation by gathering the names of gun owners in Paradise. Soon a second victim is discovered in a parking lot. Jesse orders photographs taken of all the vehicles in the lot and their license plates, suspecting that the killer or killers are still in the area. Following a third killing with the same modus operandi, an eyewitness comes forward. Jesse checks the photos from the parking lot of the second murder and discovers the car is registered to someone who matches on the list of gun owners in Paradise, a man named Andrew Lincoln (Reg Rogers).

Lincoln and his wife Brianna (Jane Adams) are middle-aged thrill killers. The couple moved to Paradise and began selecting random people and murdering them while videotaping their crimes. Later they find erotic pleasure in watching the videos of the murders while having sex. Jesse and Luther pay the Lincolns a visit and briefly interview the couple, who show interest in the murders. As they leave, Jesse tells Luther that the Lincolns are the killers.

Meanwhile, Jesse investigates the rape of a high school girl, Candace Pennington (Alexis Dziena), who refuses to talk about the incident and whose parents refuse to report the crime, to avoid a scandal. Assisted by Officer Molly Crane (Viola Davis), Jesse discovers the identity of the three boys who raped Candace. After one of the rapists, Bo Marino (Shawn Roberts), is brought in on drug charges, Jesse discovers photos in the boy's possession of the naked Candace being raped. Bo's father and his attorney arrive at the police station, but the boy spends one night in jail. After Candace agrees to testify against the boys, Bo and his father storm into Jesse's office and force a confrontation, that ends with Candace's father knocking both Bo and his father to the floor. The attorneys for the three rapists agree to have their clients plead guilty, in exchange for sentences of "community service".

While Jesse struggles to find evidence on the Lincolns, the murderous couple begin to stalk Abby Taylor. One afternoon, while walking through a park trying to reach Jesse on her mobile phone, Abby is murdered by the Lincolns in cold blood. Devastated by his girlfriend's murder, Jesse devises a plan that will encourage the killers to attempt to kill him. He goes to the Lincolns' home and returns a .22 rifle. As they taunt the police chief with subtle talk of the murders, Jesse makes it clear that he knows they are the killers.

Jesse calls Andrew Lincoln and asks to meet later that night at the parking lot scene of the second crime and Andrew agrees. Jesse suspects that the Lincolns have other plans and while Molly and Luther wait at the parking lot, Jesse waits outside Candace's house, knowing the killers intend to kill Candace. The Lincolns show up at Candace's house and enter the living room where a tape recording of Candace and her parents is playing. Just as they realize they've been set up, Jesse enters the room. Brianna pulls out two .22 caliber pistols and shoots Jesse. Jesse came prepared with a bulletproof vest. Jesse returns fire and shoots Brianna dead. He turns to Andrew and tempts him to pick up his gun, but Andrew refuses, claiming he never murdered anyone only helped, and saying no court will give him the death penalty. Jesse responds by punching him in the face.

Afterward, Jesse returns to his house by the water. His wife calls and begins to leave a message on the answering machine, but Jesse does not pick up the phone. Instead he walks outside and watches the evening sky. He also decides to keep the dog, 'Reggie'.

== Cast ==
- Tom Selleck as Jesse Stone
- Jane Adams as Brianna Lincoln
- Reg Rogers as Andrew Lincoln
- Viola Davis as Molly Crane
- Alexis Dziena as Candace Pennington
- Kohl Sudduth as Luther "Suitcase" Simpson
- Polly Shannon as Abby Taylor
- Stephen McHattie as Captain Healy
- Shawn Roberts as Bo Marino
- Alex House as Kevin Feeney
- Mimi Rogers as Rita Fiore
- Vito Rezza as Anthony D'Angelo
- Joe the Dog as Reggie
- Victoria Snow as Margaret Pennington
- Ralph Small as Chuck Pennington
- Thomas Gibson as Troy Drake
- Tony De Santis as Joe Marino
- Sylvia Villagran as Jenn (voice)
- Chris Killam as Kenneth Eisley
- John Beale as Dr. Perkins
- Cindy Sampson as Barbara Carey
- Tom Gallant as Comden
- Jeremy Akerman as Hansen
- John Dunsworth as Jim Burns
- Joseph Rutten as Philly Canter
- David Christoffel as D.A. Reagan
- Brian Heighton as Skip Wilder
- Heather Allin as Mrs. Feeney
- Glen Grant as Reporter

== Production ==
=== Filming locations ===
- Blue Rocks, Nova Scotia, Canada
- Halifax, Nova Scotia, Canada
- Lunenburg, Nova Scotia, Canada

=== Adaptation ===
Robert B. Parker's Stone Cold is the fourth novel in his Jesse Stone series, but it is the first in the series to be adapted into a film, and contains significant differences. In the film, Jesse's relationship with Jenn is still relegated to phone calls, they do not reconcile at the end and Jesse does not stop drinking; in the novel, they get together and reconcile and Jesse stops drinking. In the film, Jesse sees Abby exclusively prior to her murder; in the novel, their relationship is not exclusive. In the film, Jesse sets up the Lincolns at Candace's house; in the novel, the final shootout takes place in a mall. Finally, in the film, Officer D'Angelo is not murdered.

=== Rating ===
As of now, Stone Cold is the only film in the Jesse Stone series to receive a rating by the MPAA. It was given an R rating for "violent content, some sexuality, nudity, and brief drug use".

== Reception ==
=== Critical reception ===
In his review for DVD Talk, Preston Jones wrote:

Stone Cold doesn't break any new ground and it isn't particularly shocking, but it is competent and enjoyably diverting for what it is—a handsomely mounted, well-acted murder mystery that has aspirations towards gritty, Forties-style noir homage but settles for merely being an occasionally chiaroscuro entertainment.
