= Jesse Stone: Benefit of the Doubt =

- DVD cover
- Genre: Crime
- Based on: Characters created by Robert B. Parker
- Written by: Tom Selleck; Michael Brandman
- Screenplay by: Tom Selleck; Michael Brandman
- Directed by: Robert Harmon
- Starring: Tom Selleck; Kathy Baker; Kohl Sudduth
- Music by: Jeff Beal
- Country of origin: United States
- Original language: English

Production
- Producer: Steven J. Brandman
- Cinematography: David Gribble
- Editor: Steven Cohen
- Running time: 87 minutes
- Production companies: Brandman Productions; TWS Productions II; Sony Pictures Television

Original release
- Network: CBS
- Release: May 20, 2012

Jesse Stone: Benefit of the Doubt is a 2012 American made-for-television crime drama film directed by Robert Harmon and starring Tom Selleck, Kathy Baker, and Kohl Sudduth. Based on the characters from the Jesse Stone novels created by Robert B. Parker, the film is about the police chief of a small New England town who returns from his forced retirement after his replacement is blown up in the town police car. The story is set in the fictitious town of Paradise, Massachusetts.

Jesse Stone: Benefit of the Doubt is the eighth in a series of nine television films based on the characters of Parker's Jesse Stone novels. The film first aired on the CBS television network on May 20, 2012.

== Plot ==
Jesse Stone still misses the Paradise, Massachusetts police chief position, which he lost because the current town council president, Carter Hanson, wanted his son-in-law, William Butler, to have the job. Chief Butler and officer DeAngelo are killed when their police cruiser is destroyed by an explosion.

Curiously, the former town council president, Hastings "Hasty" Hathaway, appeared to know about the incident before the current town council president was officially notified. Jesse is reinstated as "temp chief" by Hanson and uncovers apparent (but unproved) police corruption involving Butler. Jesse discovers a possible clue: the characters "2AH10" written on the April 24 page of Butler's desk calendar.

Jesse attempts to reassemble his team, starting with his deputy Luther "Suitcase" Simpson and then longtime assistant Rose Gammon, but both have moved on to other pursuits after choosing to not work with Jesse's replacement, thus Jesse is left to solve the case himself. State Homicide Commander Healy also returns, along with Jesse's psychotherapist Dr. Dix. Thelma Gleffey remains in Jesse's life, and continues to work as a sales associate at Hasty's luxury car dealership. Gino Fish is still in town as well, still apparently in the illegal drug business while using his boxing business as a "front".

Along the way, Jesse discovers that the most likely perpetrator of the cruiser explosion, a former associate of Gino's, has apparently hanged himself. He learns from Amanda, Gino's executive assistant, that Gino has a boss, whose identity is a mystery. An otherwise routine traffic stop adds an additional clue: there is an assassin, Arthur "Art" Gallery, who has been following Jesse. Despite finding a "deer rifle" in the car's trunk, Jesse lets the man go with a warning: "Don't follow me around!" The flashlight which was attached to the barrel of the "deer rifle" would have been illegal for hunting game, a deer, but would be quite helpful, if not essential, for the assassin's assumed purpose, the killing of a man, and Jesse makes a mental note of that.

To integrate all these seemingly disparate clues and to get to the truth, Jesse employs "carefully applied pressure" to former town council president and felon Hasty; ultimately exposing Hasty as the true drug kingpin and Gino's boss. Jesse tells Hasty about the 2AH10 clue & lets him believe that data on the police Laptop hard-drive is being recovered. As a result, Hasty panics and calls his people, telling them they have to "move it up" (presumably Jesse's murder, but also the scheduled April 24 drug sale). The events are rescheduled for later that day, although a daylight murder/drug sale is risky for all involved. At the shipyard, Gallery tries to murder Jesse using his "deer rifle", but Jesse tricks him into exposing himself and is killed by Stone using his signature, customized 1911A1.

In the end, Simpson returns. It is implied that Rose may return as well. As Jesse has proved Hanson's beloved son-in-law to be corruption-free, it is also assumed that Jesse's position as chief is permanent, and not "temp chief" as Hasty preferred to call him. The title "Benefit of the Doubt" refers to Jesse's (and Dr. Dix's) belief that police officers who appear to be corrupt must be accorded the benefit of the doubt, until proven otherwise.

== Cast ==
- Tom Selleck as Jesse Stone
- Kathy Baker as former Police Officer/Dispatcher Rose Gammon
- Kohl Sudduth as former Police Officer Luther "Suitcase" Simpson
- Gloria Reuben as Thelma Gleffey
- Stephen McHattie as Captain Healy, State Police Homicide Commander
- William Sadler as Gino Fish (boxing promoter and illegal drug dealer)
- Robert Carradine as Arthur "Art" Gallery (assassin)
- Jeff Geddis as Police Chief William Butler
- Saul Rubinek as Hastings "Hasty" Hathaway (car dealer and former Paradise Town Council President)
- William Devane as Dr. Dix (Jesse's psychotherapist)
- Jeremy Akerman as Carter Hanson (Paradise Town Council President)
- John Beale as Dr. Perkins
- Naomi Blackhall-Butler as State Police Officer
- David Christoffel as H.Henry Uppman
- Joe the Dog as Reggie
- Brian Heighton as Stan
- Christopher Killam as Steven
- Sheena Larkin as Rose's Mom
- John Maclaren as Jim Gannon
- Brian MacWilliam as Luther's Dad
- Colm Magner as Hal the Doorman
- Robert Racki as Mr. Thompson
- Vito Rezza as Officer Anthony D'Angelo
- Bill Stevenson as Pianist
- Christine Tizzard as Amanda

== Release ==
The film first aired on the CBS television network on May 20, 2012. According to Selleck, this may be the last Jesse Stone film seen on the network. Selleck, however, said he is not yet finished with the Stone character. Selleck also commented that the Jesse Stone movies for TV are expensive to produce and that he had his "own money" in the last two, which accounts for his being credited as executive producer.

== Reception ==
In his review in The New York Times, Neil Genzlinger wrote: "The film is in no hurry to reach its not-hard-to-guess resolution, but that's the way this series has always been. It's as if Mr. Selleck [was] personally keeping alive a slice of television history in a much faster-paced world."

Jesse Stone: Benefit of the Doubt was watched by 12.93 million viewers, the highest viewership of the night it aired.

== See also ==
- Jesse Stone (character)
