= Gloria Reuben =

Canadian-American actress, singer, and producer (born 1964)

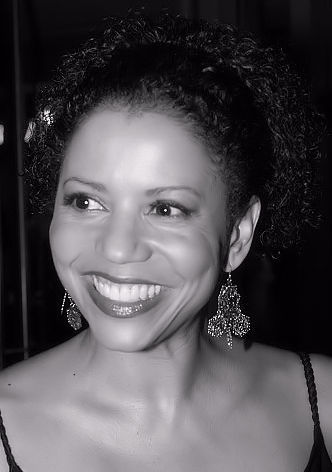
- Reuben at the 35th International Emmy Awards Gala in 2007
- Born: Gloria Elizabeth Reuben; June 9, 1964 (age 62); Toronto, Ontario, Canada
- Occupations: Actress; singer; producer
- Years active: 1985–present
- Spouse: Wayne Isaak (1999–2003)
- Children: 1

Gloria Elizabeth Reuben (born June 9, 1964) is a Canadian actress, producer, and singer. She is well-known for her role as Jeanie Boulet on the medical drama ER (1995–1999, 2008), for which she was twice nominated for an Emmy Award, and for portraying Elizabeth Keckley in the 2012 Steven Spielberg–directed film Lincoln.

She has featured in films such as Timecop (1994), Nick of Time (1995), Admission (2013), and Reasonable Doubt (2014). She played Krista Gordon on Mr. Robot (2015–2019), as well as a recurring character on City on a Hill (2019–2021). She also played Adina Johnson on Cloak & Dagger from 2018 to 2019. Beginning in 2025, she is a series regular on Boston Blue.

== Early life and education ==
Gloria Elizabeth Reuben was born on June 9, 1964 in Toronto, Ontario, to Pearl Avis (Mills), a classical singer, and Cyril George Reuben, a civil engineer. Her parents are both Jamaican-born. Her father was mostly Jewish (with Ashkenazi and Sephardi roots), though he also had some African ancestry; her mother is of mostly African descent. Her father, an elderly widower with five adult children when he married her mother, died when she was young. Her parents had split up before his death. Reuben was the subject of a segment of Henry Louis Gates Jr.'s television genealogy series Finding Your Roots.

Gloria was one of six children. Her older half-brother, Denis Simpson, was an actor and children's television host and died in 2010. Her younger brother David died in 1988. Reuben details her relationship and experience with the deaths of her brothers in her 2019 memoir My Brothers' Keeper.

Reuben began learning piano as a child and later studied music technique and theory, ballet, and jazz at the Royal Conservatory of Music.

== Career ==
=== Screen acting ===
Reuben began her career as an actress after having a few jobs as a model and in television advertisements.

Reuben came to prominence on the American television series ER as Jeanie Boulet, an HIV-positive physician assistant on the hospital's staff. She was a guest star throughout the first season and was promoted to full-time cast member at the beginning of the second. She continued that role until early in the sixth season. In 2008, Reuben returned to ER for one episode during its 14th season. She has stated that this role led to her HIV/AIDS activism. In 1996, she was chosen by People magazine as one of the 50 Most Beautiful People in the World.

Reuben again held a major role in a television series when she starred as FBI agent Brooke Haslett in 1-800-Missing (2003–2004). She later starred as Rosalind Whitman in the TNT series Raising the Bar.

Reuben guest-starred in the season two finale of Drop Dead Diva as Professor Kathy Miller. Reuben guest-starred in season 12 of NBC's Law & Order: Special Victims Unit, reprising her role as U.S. Attorney Christine Danielson. In 2012, she appeared in the CBS TV movie Jesse Stone: Benefit of the Doubt. In 2012, Reuben played Elizabeth Keckley in the historical drama film Lincoln and her portrayal of the character received critical praise. In 2013, she guest starred on the sci-fi drama series Falling Skies.

In October 2014, it was announced that Reuben had joined the cast of the USA Network series Mr. Robot. Reuben plays Dr. Krista Gordon, the psychiatrist of the show's unstable main character, Elliott. The show premiered on in June 2015. She acted in all four seasons of the show. At first a recurring role, Reuben's character was upgraded to a season regular for the fourth and final season.

In 2017, Reuben was cast as Adina Johnson, mother of Tyrone Johnson, in the series Cloak & Dagger.

In 2025, Reuben joined the cast of Blue Bloods spinoff Boston Blue as Mae Silver, the District Attorney for Boston.

=== Stage acting ===
In 1999, Reuben acted in an off-Broadway production of The Vagina Monologues. In 2006, she starred as Condoleezza Rice in the play Stuff Happens at the Public Theater. The following year, she won the Lucille Lortel Award for Outstanding Lead Actress, the preeminent honour for off-Broadway productions, for her portrayal. In 2008, she returned to the Public Theater for Conversations in Tusculum.

=== Music ===
In 2000, Reuben sang backup vocals for Tina Turner on her Twenty Four Seven Tour.

Reuben is a regularly performing jazz singer and pianist. She released her first record, Just for You, in December 2007. Her second album, Perchance to Dream, was released in April 2015; it was her first jazz record. Her latest album, For All We Know, was released on February 14, 2020, on the MCG Jazz recording label, where she is accompanied by guitarist and Grammy winning producer Marty Ashby. She performed all around New York City in the fourth quarter of 2019 to promote her upcoming record.

=== Author ===
On November 19, 2019, Reuben released a memoir, My Brothers' Keeper, detailing her journey and an exploration of the life she shared with her two brothers, as well as her emotions and experiences after their sudden deaths.

== Personal life ==
Gloria Reuben was married to TV producer Wayne Isaak from 1999 to 2003, and in 2004, she adopted a son, Zachary.

Reuben lives in Brooklyn, New York.

=== Activism ===
Reuben is a committed social activist. In large part due to her role as an HIV-positive character in ER, she continues to raise awareness about the HIV/AIDS pandemic, lobbying for increased advocacy and speaking at several major fundraising events. She also takes great interest in global issues, predominantly climate change, nature, and human rights. Gloria Reuben is the president of Waterkeeper Alliance, an organization that strengthens and grows a global network of grassroots leaders protecting everyone’s right to clean water. She is also a special adviser on climate change for The Climate Reality Project, former United States vice president Al Gore's environmental organization. She was formerly on the board for the National Wildlife Federation. Reuben is also on the Leadership Council for the RFK Center for Justice and Human Rights.

== Filmography ==
Key
†	Denotes works that have not yet been released

=== Films ===
Year	Title	Role	Notes
1992	Wild Orchid II: Two Shades of Blue	Celeste	
1994	Timecop	Sarah Fielding	
1995	Nick of Time	Krista Brooks	
1998	Indiscreet	Eve Dodd	
1999	Macbeth in Manhattan	Claudia/Lady Macbeth	
1999	David and Lola	Gloria	
1999	Deep in My Heart	Barbara Ann Williams	
2000	Pilgrim	Vicky	
2000	Shaft	Sgt. Council	Uncredited
2001	The Feast of All Saints	Cecile Ste. Marie	
2002	Happy Here and Now	Hannah	
2003	Salem Witch Trials	Tituba Indian	
2006	The Sentinel	Mrs. Merriweather	
2007	Life Support	Sandra	
2012	Lincoln	Elizabeth Keckley	Nominated: NAACP Image Award for Outstanding Supporting Actress in a Motion Picture; Broadcast Film Critics Association Award for Best Cast; Detroit Film Critics Society for Best Ensemble; Washington D.C. Area Film Critics Association Award for Best Ensemble
2013	Admission	Corrinne	
2014	Reasonable Doubt	Detective Blake Kanon	
2015	The Longest Ride	Adrienne Francis	
2015	Anesthesia	Meredith	
2016	Jean of the Joneses	Janet	
2017	Who We Are Now	Rebecca	
2018	Every Day Is Christmas	Lydia	
2019	The Jesus Rolls	Lady Owner	
2022	Firestarter	Captain Hollister	
2025	My Dead Friend Zoe	Kris	
TBA	I Do Again †	Brenda Petty	Filming

=== Television ===
Year	Title	Role	Notes
1985	Polka Dot Door	Host	
1990–1991	The Flash	Sabrina	5 episodes
1995	Homicide: Life on the Street	Det. Theresa Walker	3 episodes
1995–1999, 2008	ER	Jeanie Boulet	Series regular; 102 episodes Won: Screen Actors Guild Award for Outstanding Performance by an Ensemble in a Drama Series (1996, 1997, 1998, 1999); Viewers for Quality Television for Best Supporting Actress in a Drama Series (1997, 1998); Nominated: Golden Globe Award for Best Supporting Actress – Series, Miniseries or Television Film (1998); Primetime Emmy Award for Outstanding Supporting Actress in a Drama Series (1997, 1998); Screen Actors Guild Award for Outstanding Performance by an Ensemble in a Drama Series (2000); NAACP Image Award for Outstanding Actress in a Drama Series (1996, 1997, 1998, 1999)
2001–2002	The Agency	Lisa Fabrizzi	Regular: episodes 1–13, 21–22
2002, 2007–2011	Law & Order: Special Victims Unit	Violet Tremain (2002) / Christine Danielson (2007–2011)	4 episodes
2002	Little John	Natalie Britain	TV film; Nominated – NAACP Image Award for Outstanding Actress in a Television Film
2003–2004	1-800-Missing	Brooke Haslett	Series regular; season 1: 18 episodes
2005	Numb3rs	Erica Quimby	Episode: "Noisy Edge"
2008–2009	Raising the Bar	Rosalind Whitman	Series regular; 25 episodes
2010	Drop Dead Diva	Professor Kathy Miller	Episode: "Freeze the Day"
2011	Jesse Stone: Innocents Lost	Thelma Gleffey	TV movie
2012	Jesse Stone: Benefit of the Doubt	Thelma Gleffey	TV movie
2013	Betty & Coretta	Myrlie Evers-Williams	Television film
2013	Falling Skies	Marina Peralta	10 episodes
2014	Happy Face Killer	FBI Agent Melinda Gand	TV movie
2015	The Music in Me	Gloria	TV movie
2015–2017	The Blacklist	Dr. Selma Orchard	2 episodes
2015–2019	Mr. Robot	Dr. Krista Gordon	Recurring role
2015	Jesse Stone: Lost in Paradise	Thelma Gleffey	TV movie
2016–2017	Saints & Sinners	Mayor Pamela Clayborne	Series regular
2017	The Breaks	Mattie Taylor	4 episodes
2017	The Librarians	Jade Wells	Episode: "And the Silver Screen"
2018	Blindspot	Kira Evans	6 episodes
2018–2019	Cloak & Dagger	Adina Johnson	Series regular
2019–2021	City on a Hill	Eloise Hastings	Recurring role
2021	Blue Bloods	ATF Agent Rachel Weber	2 episodes
2022	The First Lady	Valerie Jarrett	3 episodes
2022–2023	The Equalizer	Trish	2 episodes
2023	NCIS: Hawaiʻi	Col. Tannon McCarthy	Episode: "Cabin Fever"
2024	Elsbeth	Claudia Payne	Recurring role
2025	The Better Sister	Michelle Sanders	Recurring role
2025	Boston Blue	Mae Silver	Series regular
