= Jesse Stone: Lost in Paradise =

- Promotional photo
- Genre: Crime
- Based on: Characters created by Robert B. Parker
- Written by: Tom Selleck; Michael Brandman
- Directed by: Robert Harmon
- Starring: Tom Selleck; Mackenzie Foy; William Devane; Luke Perry
- Music by: Jeff Beal
- Country of origin: United States
- Original language: English

Production
- Executive producer: Michael Brandman
- Producer: Steven J. Brandman
- Cinematography: David Gribble
- Editor: Lawrence Curtis
- Running time: 86 min.
- Production companies: Brandman Productions; TWS Productions II; Sony Pictures Television

Original release
- Network: Hallmark Channel
- Release: October 18, 2015

Jesse Stone: Lost in Paradise is a 2015 American made-for-television crime drama film directed by Robert Harmon and starring Tom Selleck, Mackenzie Foy, William Devane, and Luke Perry. Written by Selleck and Michael Brandman, the film is about a police chief of the (fictional) small town of Paradise, Massachusetts, who investigates the murder of the apparent fourth victim of a brutal serial killer. Filmed on location in Lunenburg and Halifax, Nova Scotia,

Jesse Stone: Lost in Paradise is the ninth film in a series of nine television films based on the characters of Robert B. Parker's Jesse Stone novels. It first aired on the Hallmark Channel on October 18, 2015.

== Plot ==
Police Chief Jesse Stone accepts a position as an unpaid consultant with the Massachusetts State Police Homicide Unit, working for Lt. Sydney Greenstreet who gives him case files on several murders. He accepts the job to relieve the boredom he has been feeling due to the lack of any significant crime transpiring lately in the town of Paradise. Jesse has also been lonely because his dog recently died. After reviewing the files, Stone takes special interest in one case that involves the fourth victim of a brutal serial killer who slashed and disemboweled his victims while they were still alive. All 4 victims where butchered in the same unique manner, not made public. The jailed killer, a man named Richard Steele and known as the "Boston Ripper", admits to the first three murders with pride, but maintains he did not commit the fourth murder. After interviewing the killer, Stone concludes that he's a "sick son of a bitch", but does not believe he killed the fourth victim, Mavis Davies.

Stone interviews Mavis' husband, Bruce Davies, who is still bitter after having learned during the investigation that his wife was working as a high-priced prostitute when she was killed. When Stone asks for his help, Davies informs him that he has no intention of helping to reopen the investigation. Stone asks about Mavis' dog, who appears in some of the crime scene photos, Davies tells him he gave "Steve" to an animal shelter when he refused to eat. Stone goes to the shelter and adopts the dog just before he is to be euthanized. The dog looks like Stone's deceased pet, Reggie. At Stone's home, the dog continues to refuse to eat, even the expensive steaks that Stone offers.

Meanwhile, Stone encounters a thirteen-year-old girl named Jenny smoking marijuana in a park. He takes an interest in the troubled girl's welfare, and calls his friend and colleague, Paradise Police Officer Luther "Suitcase" Simpson, and asks him to investigate the girl's home life. "Suit" discovers that the girl's mother is a drunk and that she hits her daughter. Later, after seeing Jenny with a bruised face, Stone visits her mother and offers her a "voucher" to seek help for her alcoholism with Jesse's psychiatrist Dr. Dix. He tells her that if he even suspects that she's hit her daughter again, he will arrest her.

Returning home, Stone offers leftover spaghetti and meatballs to Steve, and to his surprise, the dog eats it.

Back on the case, Stone meets with State Police Detective Dan Leary, the officer who arrested the killer, who tells Stone that he's convinced the "Boston Ripper" committed all four murders, noting that since Richard was jailed, "the murders have stopped". Continuing his investigation, Stone interviews the autopsy doctor and confirms that the toxicology report is missing from the file. Stone tells Lt. Greenstreet that he believes the file was "scrubbed". Later, Stone discusses the case with his psychiatrist, Dr. Dix, who is also a former cop, who advises, "If you don't like the answers you're getting, check your premises."

Stone visits gangster Gino Fish and learns where the fourth victim worked as a prostitute. The "dating agency" owner tells Stone about Mavis Davies' friend, Charlotte, who recently left the business. He finds Charlotte, now running a cafe under her real name, Amelia Hope, and learns that Mavis was having an affair and was in love with a police officer.

Back at Lt. Greenstreet's office, Stone reveals that he suspects that Detective Leary was Mavis' lover and that he killed Mavis in the same manner as the "Boston Ripper", and observes at the time of the offenses, reports would be routinely copied to the defunct and now-forgotten Law Enforcement Teletype System, and that these should still be complete. When Greenstreet consults the current National Law Enforcement Telecommunications System (NLETS) it confirms that Leary had arrested Mavis for prostitution while he worked in the vice squad, another instance of record tampering, this time strongly implicating Leary.

Soon after, Leary shows up at Amelia's cafe claiming to have been sent by Stone. Realizing she is in danger, Amelia attempts to escape but is handcuffed, and when Stone arrives on the scene Leary first threatens to kill her, then fires at Stone who returns fire, killing Leary instantly.

After the shooting Jesse comforts Amelia, and later he accompanies Jenny to the St. Agnes Refuge where his friend, Sister Mary John, offers the young girl a place to live while her mother is treated for her alcoholism. The closing scene is of Stone sitting on a bench overlooking the ocean, his new dog Steve at his side.

== Cast ==
- Tom Selleck as Jesse Stone
- Mackenzie Foy as Jenny
- Luke Perry as Richard Steele, the "Boston Ripper"
- Leslie Hope as Lt. Sydney Greenstreet
- William Devane as Dr. Dix
- William Sadler as Gino Fish
- Amelia Rose Blaire as Charlotte/Amelia Hope
- Gloria Reuben as Thelma Gleffey
- Al Sapienza as Bruce Davies
- Tara Yelland as Mavis Davies
- Alex Carter as Detective Dan Leary
- Christine Tizzard as Amanda
- Kohl Sudduth as Luther "Suitcase" Simpson
- Kerri Smith as Sister Mary John
- John Michael Higgins as Evan Winters
- Ned the Dog as Steve

== Production ==
Jesse Stone: Lost in Paradise was filmed on location in Lunenburg and Halifax, Nova Scotia, Canada.

== Critical response ==
Writing in the Reno Gazette-Journal, Mike Hughes called the film a "must-see" and declared it "the best yet" of the Jesse Stone film series and "worth the wait". Hughes concludes that "the film neatly balances character depth and a solid mystery". Columnist Jeanne Jakle, writing in MySA, writes that Selleck "commands the screen with the subdued intensity he's brought to the title character for 10 years". Jakle finds the music, muted photography, and slow pace "oddly comforting", and concludes:

Lost in Paradise is a decent whodunit, but the beauty of the movie, as always, lies with its deliciously melancholy execution and, of course, Selleck's layered and quietly magnetic performance, which once again adds to his status as one of TV's stalwart greats.
