= Robert Harmon =

American director (born 1953)

- Born: 1953 (age 72–73); White Plains, New York, U.S.
- Occupations: Film director, television director

Robert Harmon (born 1953) is an American film and television director. He is best known for the 1986 horror film The Hitcher, starring Rutger Hauer, as well as for films like They and Nowhere to Run.

His television work is distinguished by the series of made-for-TV movies featuring fictional Paradise (Mass.) Police Chief Jesse Stone, which began in 2005 with Stone Cold, starring Tom Selleck, as well as the Emmy-nominated biopics Ike: Countdown to D-Day (also starring Selleck) and Gotti, starring Armand Assante. He has directed a few episodes of the TV show Blue Bloods, which also stars Tom Selleck.

== Awards and nominations ==
Harmon was nominated for a Directors Guild of America Award in 1997 for Gotti and a Primetime Emmy Award in 2004 for Ike: Countdown to D-Day.

== Selected credits ==
- China Lake (1983)
- The Hitcher (1986)
- Eyes of an Angel (1991)
- Nowhere to Run (1993)
- Gotti (1996) (TV)
- The Crossing (2000) (TV)
- Level 9 (2000) TV series (unknown episodes)
- They (2002)
- Highwaymen (2003)
- Ike: Countdown to D-Day (2004) (TV)
- Jesse Stone: Stone Cold (2005) (TV)
- Jesse Stone: Night Passage (2006) (TV)
- Jesse Stone: Death in Paradise (2006) (TV)
- Jesse Stone: Sea Change (2007) (TV)
- Jesse Stone: Thin Ice 2009) (TV)
- Jesse Stone: No Remorse (2010) (TV)
- November Christmas (2010) (TV)
- Blue Bloods (2011) TV series (unknown episodes)
- Jesse Stone: Benefit of the Doubt (2012) (TV)
- Jesse Stone: Lost in Paradise (2015) (TV)
