= Liisa Repo-Martell =

Canadian actor, artist (born 1971)

- Born: February 1971 (age 55); Toronto, Ontario, Canada
- Occupation: Actress
- Years active: 1988–present
- Known for: Gemini award winner

Liisa Repo-Martell is a Canadian actress and artist.

Repo-Martell's parents, Satu Repo and George Martell, were founding editors of This Magazine Is About Schools, an influential independent Canadian magazine now known as This Magazine.

Repo-Martell grew up in Toronto and attended Jarvis Collegiate Institute in the mid-1980s. She received a Gemini award was for her 1998 performance in Nights Below Station Street. She has had two other Gemini nominations for appearances on This is Wonderland and Flashpoint.

She portrayed Mrs. Genest, the estranged wife of Joe Genest (Stephen Baldwin), in the 2006 made-for-TV-movie Jesse Stone: Night Passage. In February 2012, the National Post called Repo-Martell, and her husband; actor and theatre-director Chris Abraham, a "Toronto theatre power couple". Repo-Mertell portrayed Sir Reginald Hargreeves' wife Abigail in the Netflix series The Umbrella Academy (2019–2024).

== Filmography ==
=== Film ===
Year	Title	Role	Notes
1988	Cocktail	Young girl in deli	
1989	American Boyfriends	Julie La Belle	
1992	Unforgiven	Faith	
1996	Can I Get a Witness?	Sam	Short film
1996	The English Patient	Jan	
2000	Washed Up	Brains	
2000	Infidelity	Maid	Short film
2000	Hold-Up	Woman	Short film
2003	Bastards	Finnie	
2004	Touch of Pink	Delia	
2007	Diamonds in a Bucket	Vivian	Short film
2007	Lars and the Real Girl	Laurel	
2015	King Lear	Regan	
2016	Lavender	Jennifer	
2020	Flashback	Mrs. Fitzell	
2020	Happy Place	Nina	
2025	Blueberry Grunt	Vivian	

=== Television ===
Year	Title	Role	Notes
1989	Street Legal	Kate Quinlan	"Soul Custody"
1992	The Good Fight	Sandra	TV film
1993	E.N.G.	Terry	"The Big Sleepover"
1993	Class of '96	Miranda	"The Adventures of Pat's Man and Robin"
1993	Kung Fu: The Legend Continues	Patty	"The Lacquered Box"
1994	TekWar: TekLab	Galahad	TV film
1994	Lives of Girls and Women	Naomi	TV film
1995	Kung Fu: The Legend Continues	Trish	"May I Walk with You"
1996	Lonesome Dove: The Outlaw Years	Billy Jean	"Partners"
1996	Hidden in America	Angela	TV film
1996	Critical Choices	Amy	TV film
1997	Once a Thief	Nikki	"Rave On"
1998	Thanks of a Grateful Nation	Kristie Schuermann	TV film
1998	Nights Below Station Street	Adele Walsh	TV film
1998–1999	Emily of New Moon	Maida Flynn	"Falling Angels" & "The Return of Maida Flynn"
1999	Earth: Final Conflict	Amanda Hayes	"Volunteers"
1999	Psi Factor: Chronicles of the Paranormal	Jenny Turner	"Body and Soul"
2000	Strong Medicine	Jessie	"Pilot"
2002	Scared Silent	Carole Bakelin	TV film
2003	Missing	Stacy Drake	"Thin Air"
2005–2006	This Is Wonderland	Sandy Fisher	Recurring role
2006	Jesse Stone: Night Passage	Carole Genest	TV film
2006	Jesse Stone: Death in Paradise	Carole Genest	TV film
2006	Puppets Who Kill	Lottie	"Buttons and the Dying Wish Foundation"
2007	Trapped!	First Officer Maiju Saari	"Ocean Emergency"
2008	ReGenesis	Marie Gervais	"The Kiss"
2009	Diverted	Eileen Northbrook	TV film
2009	The Listener	Rebecca Cahill	"My Sister's Keeper"
2010	Republic of Doyle	Shannie Malone	"The Fall of the Republic"
2010	Flashpoint	Claire Williams	"Acceptable Risk"
2011, 2020	Murdoch Mysteries	Lydia Howland/Bridget Mulcahy	"Dead End Street"/"Rigid Silence"
2011	Committed	Donneymeade	TV film
2012	King	Dot Fuller	"Freddy Boise"
2013	Cracked	Angie Coturno	"Spirited Away"
2014	Remedy	Cynthia	"Homecoming"
2016	Saving Hope	Tracy	"Not Fade Away"
2019, 2022–2024	The Umbrella Academy	Abigail Hargreeves	7 episodes
2019	Anne with an E	Mrs. Rose	"The Summit of My Desires" and "Great and Sudden Change"
