= Sea Change (Parker novel) =

2006 crime novel by Robert B. Parker

- First edition
- Author: Robert B. Parker
- Language: English
- Series: Jesse Stone
- Genre: Crime novel
- Publisher: Putnam
- Publication date: 2006
- Publication place: United States
- Pages: 304
- ISBN: 978-0-399-15267-2
- Preceded by: Stone Cold
- Followed by: High Profile

Sea Change is a 2006 crime novel by Robert B. Parker, the fifth in his Jesse Stone series.

== Plot summary ==
In his grittiest investigation to date, Jesse Stone hunts for the killer of a woman whose body washes up on shore. The woman turns out to be Florence “Flo” Horvath, of Miami, Florida. She was pushed off a boat, then run over; knocking her unconscious and causing her to drown. The investigation comes to a halt shortly after she is identified, until Jesse acquires a tape of Flo having sex with two men at the same time. He also discovers that Flo rented a boat before she was murdered, but that it was returned to the wrong place. During the investigation he is led to the yacht “The Lady Jane.” He questions the yacht owner Harrison Darnell, and the other occupants, who of course all deny knowing Flo. In an attempt to get more information, Jesse sneaks onto the yacht and finds a stack of sex tapes. He takes one and reviews it, and although it is sexual in nature, he does not find anything criminal.

Later seventeen-year-old Cathleen Holten comes to Chief Stone with accusations of rape. She claims that a man took her onto his yacht, The Lady Jane, forces her to strip for his friends and then rapes her in his cabin. Although, Jesse does not believe her, and the rape later proves to be consensual sex, he uses this opportunity to get a warrant and search the yacht. Having been there before he goes right for the video tapes and confiscates them. While reviewing them with Molly, she recognizes her daughter's fifteen-year-old friend as one of the sex partners. Although Jesse now has the yacht owner for statutory rape, he continues to investigate, determined to get the murderer. However, in the end he does have him and another man arrested for statutory rape. He next finds one of the men in Flo's sex tape and discovers that the men in the tape were brothers. He reveals that it was Flo's sisters that made the tape.

He next interviews Flo's sisters, twins Claudia and Corless. They tell Jesse they learned of Flo's death from their friend Kimmie Young. They also tell him that they made the tape to make Flo's boyfriend, Harrison Darnell, jealous. Jesse strikes up a partnership with Miami detective Kelly Cruz, and has her interview Flo's parents and Kimmie. Although Flo's parents seem harmless, Kimmie tells Cruz that she had no idea that Flo was dead. She later tells Cruz that Flo's father raped her when she was fifteen and routinely had sex with all three of his daughters. Kelly Cruz also interviews Darnell's private pilot and discovers that he flew her to Boston a few days before her murder. Finally Chief Stone discovers through Flo's father's E-ZPass that he drove to Boston the week that she was murdered, although he denies the trip.

After discovering this, Jesse flies down to Miami where he and Kelly Cruz confront him about the trip. His wife, in a drunken rage, accuses him of murdering their daughter and he confesses. Jesse later speculates that Flo's father had her rent a boat, pushed her off of it, then returns it to the first place he sees, explaining why it had been returned to the wrong place. He responds that he did indeed argue with her on the boat, and push her off, but that she simply drowned unbeknownst to him. After he discovered she had died he denied the trip all together fearing that he would be accused of murder.

Jesse later asks the twins why they said they learned of Flo's death from Kimmie, because had they not said that he may have never suspected their father. They claim to not remember saying Kimmie. Jesse speculates that they may have subconsciously wanted their father caught. The twins also reveal that the sex tape was not made for Flo's boyfriend, but for their father. It is this tape that causes him to fly into a jealous rage and drive up to Boston to murder her. Having all seen the tape, it causes the twins and their mother all to suspect that he murdered Flo.

== Subplots ==
Jesse stopped drinking by the end of Stone Cold, and continues his sobriety throughout this novel. At the end of the novel, on his one-year anniversary of sobriety, Jesse decides he can now drink in moderation. Furthermore, Jenn moves in with him and they finally commit to a monogamous relationship with each other.

== Film Differences ==
The film plot is drastically different from the novel, with the title nearly the only similarity. Cathleen's apparent rape, revealed to be consensual, is the only significant plot detail maintained in the film, though relegated to a subplot.

== Reception ==
The novel received a positive response from the majority of critics, including Publishers Weekly, who described the dialogue as "witty, flirtatious, droll, and sexually charged".

Tom Selleck received a 2007 Emmy Award nomination for "Outstanding Lead Actor in a Miniseries or a Movie" for his performance as Stone in the television movie adaptation.
