= Jesse Stone: Sea Change =

Television film

- DVD cover
- Genre: Crime
- Based on: Sea Change by Robert B. Parker
- Screenplay by: Ronni Kern
- Directed by: Robert Harmon
- Starring: Tom Selleck; Kathy Baker; Kohl Sudduth; Rebecca Pidgeon; Sean Young; Mika Boorem; Stephen McHattie; William Sadler; James Gammon; Nigel Bennett; Vito Rezza; James Rogers; Jeremy Akerman; John Beale; Saul Rubinek; Viola Davis; William Devane
- Music by: Jeff Beal
- Country of origin: United States
- Original language: English

Production
- Producer: Steven J. Brandman
- Cinematography: Rene Ohashi
- Editor: Roberto Silvi
- Running time: 88 minutes
- Production companies: Brandman Productions; Sony Pictures Television

Original release
- Network: CBS
- Release: May 22, 2007

Jesse Stone: Sea Change is a 2007 American made-for-television crime drama film directed by Robert Harmon and starring Tom Selleck, Kathy Baker, and Kohl Sudduth. Based on the 2006 novel Sea Change by Robert B. Parker, the film is about Jesse Stone, the police chief of a small New England town who investigates the unsolved murder of Rebecca Lewis, a bank teller shot during a robbery, and an alleged rape that draws him into conflict with the town council who hope to preserve the town's reputation as an ideal seaside resort. Filmed on location in Nova Scotia, the story is set in the fictitious town of Paradise, Massachusetts. Jesse Stone: Sea Change is the fourth in a series of nine television films based on Parker's Jesse Stone novels.

The fourth film in the series, it first aired on the CBS television network March 22, 2007. Selleck was nominated for a Primetime Emmy Award for Outstanding Lead Actor in a Miniseries or Movie for his performance in the film at the 59th Primetime Emmy Awards. Cinematographer Rene Ohashi was nominated for an American Society of Cinematographers Award for Outstanding Achievement in Cinematography in Motion Picture, Limited Series, or Pilot Made for Television at the 2007 American Society of Cinematographers Awards.

== Plot ==
In the small town of Paradise, Massachusetts, chief of police Jesse Stone is on the phone with his ex-wife Jenn in Los Angeles, who tells him not to call her that night. She's started seeing someone, who finds it strange that the two still talk every evening. Stone is dealing with other changes: his deputy, Luther "Suitcase" Simpson, is still in a coma from a head-wound he received in a supermarket robbery; his other deputy, Molly Crane, resigned from the force to have a family. Her replacement, Rose Gammon, is learning to deal with Stone, as she had once worked for his predecessor.

Stone struggles with his drinking. A concerned neighbor, Hilda Evans, recommends the music of Johannes Brahms as comfort during troubled times. After stopping by the hospital to read to Luther, Stone returns home alone and plays an album of Brahms' piano music. (Note: The music is from Six Pieces for Piano, Intermezzo in A Major, Op. 118 No. 2 by Johannes Brahms. Completed in 1893 and dedicated to Clara Schumann, the collection was the second to last composition to be published during Brahms' lifetime, and his second to last work composed for solo piano.) He also drinks and finally falls asleep.

The next day, Stone visits his psychiatrist, Dr. Dix, whom he hasn't seen in months. Stone acknowledges that he drinks more when work is slow. Dr. Dix advises him to find a way to occupy his time, and to make it important. Back at the office, Jesse has Rose pull up the unsolved homicide cases (cold cases), and chooses one to investigate: in 1992 female bank teller Rebecca Lewis was found dead and buried after having been taken hostage during a robbery. Police thought she was killed by the robber. Jesse and Rose go to the site where the body was found, and he digs for more clues. He discovers the gunman's clothes buried beneath the area where the body was found, and they shows damage suspicious for a gunshot wound. Later, Jesse questions the security guard Bob; based on the body's wounds, he was thought to have accidentally shot Rebecca during the robbery. Bob repeats that he shot the robber, not the clerk.

Meanwhile, Luther awakens suddenly from his coma. After effects include his having acquired "cop-ly intuition". Jesse is troubled by loose ends in the Lewis case, particularly the small amount of money the bank claimed as stolen. He talks to Hasty Hathaway, knowing his background in money laundering, and asks if the $24,000 claimed stolen was the actual bank losses. Hasty reveals that the amount was closer to $2 million, but much was hidden in a money laundering scheme by Boston mobster Gino Fish. Hasty tells Gino that Jesse is on the case. Interested in getting his money back, Gino has Terrance Genest follow Jesse.

Jesse also investigates the case of eighteen-year-old Cathleen Holton, who alleges she was raped by the older Harrison Pendleton, on board his yacht. Sybil Martin, also a passenger at the time, tells Jesse that Pendleton had a videotape of the two. Jesse burgles the yacht to obtain the tape, which shows Holton consenting to the sex. Confronting the young woman, Jesse tells her about the video. He encourages her to tell her father Sam the truth, and learn from her mistake. He suggests that Pendleton was wrong in seducing her, given their difference in ages, but it wasn't illegal. (Note: Jesse tells Holton, "You know, you live long enough, you have regrets. And the ones that nag at you the most are the ones where you knew you had a choice. The ones where you knew you could have stopped yourself. The ones where you looked into the mirror and everything good inside you said, 'Don't do this.'")

During the cold case investigation, Jesse visits Rebecca's sister, Leeann, who has moved from California to Massachusetts to care for her ailing mother Mary after Rebecca's death. Under questioning, Leeann says her earnings from working in real estate has funded Mary's hospice care. They have more talks and appear attracted to each other. Meanwhile, Luther's cop-ly intuition leads him to get a background check on Leeann; he learns her landlady reported her missing on the day of the robbery, and she worked as a waitress. Jesse deduces that the woman claiming to be Leeann is Rebecca Lewis.

Jesse confronts Leann. She admits to being Rebecca and says that she discovered a money laundering operation at the bank, with large amounts of money unaccounted for. She and her sister planned to steal this illegal money, with her sister posing as a male bank robber who would take her hostage. But Bob shot Leeann. By the time the sisters reached the site where they planned to drop the disguise and escape, Leeann died. Rebecca buried the "robber's" clothes; dressed her sister in her own clothes, and buried her. She took the money and escaped to California, assuming her sister's identity. Two years later, her mother suffered a stroke the day after the body of Leeann was discovered. Rebecca moved back to Massachusetts to care for her mother, while posing as Leeann. Jesse leaves her to care for Mary.

Back in Boston, Jesse tells Gino that the woman who stole his money from the bank used most of it taking care of her sick mother. At first thinking Jesse is being facetious, Gino comes to believe that Jesse does not know where the money is and agrees to call off Terrance. Returning home to Paradise that night, Jesse calls Rebecca but is unable to speak. As he straightens his framed picture of Ozzie Smith that is perpetually crooked, Terrance steps from the shadows and fires a shot at him. Seeing Terrance in the reflection of the glass, Jesse avoids the shot, dives for his gun on the coffee table, and takes cover behind the kitchen counter where he returns fire and kills Terrance. Afterwards, Jesse walks out onto the deck, sits down with a drink, and with Reggie at his side, looks out in loneliness at the evening sky.

== Cast ==
- Tom Selleck as Jesse Stone
- Kathy Baker as Rose Gammon
- Kohl Sudduth as Luther "Suitcase" Simpson
- Rebecca Pidgeon as Leeann Lewis
- Sean Young as Sybil Martin
- Mika Boorem as Cathleen Holton
- Stephen McHattie as Captain Healy
- William Sadler as Gino Fish
- James Gammon as Bob
- Nigel Bennett as Harrison Pendleton
- Vito Rezza as Anthony D'Angelo
- James Rogers as Terry Genest
- Jeremy Akerman as Councilman #1
- John Beale as Dr. Perkins
- Saul Rubinek as "Hasty" Hathaway
- Viola Davis as Molly Crane
- William Devane as Dr. Dix
- Scott Wickware as Sam Holton
- Marcia Bennett as Hilda Evans
- Jean Morpugo as Mary Lewis
- Gil Anderson as Jenn (voice)
- Joe the Dog as Reggie

== Production ==
The film was shot in Halifax, Nova Scotia, Canada.

== Reception ==
=== Critical response ===
In his review in Variety, Brian Lowry wrote that Jesse Stone: Sea Change "picks up seamlessly where the previous installments left off." The strength of these television movies, according to Lowry, is not the solving of crime cases, which at times is peripheral to these stories, but in "watching Selleck inhabit a character wrestling with inner demons". Lowry notes the valuable contribution of Jeff Beal's "hypnotic" musical score to these films, and applauds director Robert Harmon and writer Ronni Kern, who "allow the action to unfold slowly, at the kind of languid pace that might prove off-putting if Selleck wasn't so consistently interesting as Stone". Lowery concludes:

The Stone series exults in Selleck's old-fashioned leading-man qualities, as well as the freedom to create a noirish world where the whodunit elements take a back seat to the atmosphere. In that respect, these movies occupy a space between features and episodic crime procedurals by daring to indulge in moments of quiet, which perhaps explains why a segment of the audience—generally older, and surely more discriminating—has responded to them so enthusiastically.

In his review for DVD Talk, Paul Mavis singled out Selleck's "accomplished, mournful portrayal of the troubled, depressed alcoholic cop, and the sustained moody tone that continuing director Robert Harmon ... achieves again here. For Mavis, the main shortcoming of the film is that mystery fans will not have too much trouble guessing the solution well before Jesse does. He also notes a few hanging loose threads, such as introducing Sybil Martin (played by Sean Young), who is set up to be important, but who just "fades away into the background". Despite these negatives, the film succeeds largely on the presence and performance of the leading man:

Selleck really does have a "weight," a solidity of actorly chops that meshes quite nicely with his unmistakable star appeal. He has what the old timers had, that certain "something" that you immediately sense when he appears on screen. For this reviewer, ... Selleck's craggy face and large frame dovetails nicely with memories of Mitchum, Wayne and Gable, creating that kind of big-screen confidence and assurance you don't see in too many actors working on TV today.

=== Awards and nominations ===
- 2007 Emmy Award Nomination for Outstanding Lead Actor in a Miniseries or Movie (Tom Selleck)
- 2007 Satellite Award Nomination for Best Actor in a Miniseries or a Motion Picture Made for Television (Tom Selleck)
- 2007 American Society of Cinematographers Award Nomination for Outstanding Achievement in Cinematography (Rene Ohashi)
- 2008 Canadian Society of Cinematographers Award Nomination for Best Cinematography in TV Drama (Rene Ohashi)
