= Jesse Stone: Thin Ice =

2009 television film directed by Robert Harmon

- DVD cover
- Genre: Crime
- Based on: Characters created by Robert B. Parker
- Screenplay by: Ronni Kern
- Story by: Ronni Kern; Tom Selleck; Michael Brandman
- Directed by: Robert Harmon
- Starring: Tom Selleck; Kathy Baker; Kohl Sudduth; Leslie Hope; Stephen McHattie; William Devane; Jessica Hecht; Joanna Miles; Fulvio Cecere; Camryn Manheim; William Sadler
- Music by: Jeff Beal
- Country of origin: United States
- Original language: English

Production
- Producer: Steven J. Brandman
- Cinematography: Rene Ohashi
- Editor: Roberto Silvi
- Running time: 88 minutes
- Production companies: Brandman Productions; Sony Pictures Television

Original release
- Network: CBS
- Release: March 1, 2009

Jesse Stone: Thin Ice is a 2009 American made-for-television crime drama film directed by Robert Harmon and starring Tom Selleck, Kathy Baker, and Kohl Sudduth. Based on the characters from the Jesse Stone book series created by Robert B. Parker, the film is about the police chief of a small New England town who investigates a cryptic letter sent to Elizabeth Blue, the mother of a kidnapped child who was declared dead. Filmed on location in Nova Scotia, the story is set in the fictitious town of Paradise, Massachusetts.

Jesse Stone: Thin Ice is the fifth in a series of nine television films based on the characters of Parker's Jesse Stone novels. The film received an American Society of Cinematographers Award for Outstanding Achievement in Cinematography at the 2009 American Society of Cinematographers Awards, as well as a Canadian Society of Cinematographers Award for Best Cinematography in TV Drama for Rene Ohashi.

== Plot ==
=== Main plot ===
State Police Captain Healy is attacked but is saved by Jesse Stone, who is able to get off a couple of shots at the unknown assailant despite also being wounded. At the hospital, Healy reveals to Jesse that he was spying on his nephew, who may be sleeping with his saxophone instructor. Jesse begins investigating the shooting despite protests from the Paradise town council. The town council members feel that the police department is already spread too thin, and they and Internal Affairs are concerned about six shooting incidents Jesse has been involved in. They also don’t like that Jesse ran Officer Anthony D'Angelo out of the department because he didn’t like him. The town council liked him very much because he wrote three times as many parking tickets as the other officers, and manned the speed trap into the town, bringing in substantial revenue for Paradise. Jesse refuses to have the speed trap manned, because he feels it is unethical, and cuts down the tree that blocks the speed limit sign so the speed trap won’t work anymore.

Meanwhile Jesse continues his regular phone calls with his ex-wife Jenn. She is contemplating moving in with Elliot, and Jesse tells her it would be unethical for her to move in with her producer. She hangs up on him. Jesse also continues his therapy, but Dr. Dix seems to be having trouble himself. He visits Jesse at his office and confesses that he misses being a cop. Seeing that Dix is in need of a friend, Jesse offers to buy him dinner.

Jesse continues to investigate the shooting of Captain Healy despite being told not to. He questions Gino Fish about the shooting, but gets nothing. He also talks to Sister Mary John, who indicates that it may have been linked to underage prostitution, and gives him three names. Once again Jesse contacts Fish, knowing his distaste for prostitution, and without diming the person out directly, Fish indicates to Jesse that he would focus his investigation on the second name Sister Mary John gave him, Teddy Leaf. Meanwhile Jesse begins sleeping with the Internal Affairs officer who is investigating him, Sidney Greenstreet. He uses his influence with her to get some information on Leaf, and begins following him. When he reveals this to Captain Healy, Healy gets very upset and tells Jesse not to pursue Leaf because he is extremely dangerous. Jesse ignores this and pursues him anyway, threatening Leaf in a bar bathroom. Greenstreet warns Jesse that he had better tread carefully, because she knows how he works: he sets people up. Jesse then gets Leaf to follow him to an apartment with Suitcase's help, and blindsides him. He ties him up in the apartment and anonymously calls the police who then bust him for breaking and entering, and carrying a weapon; both parole violations that get him locked up for a long time. Jesse figures this is better than nothing, since they can’t get him on the shooting.

=== Subplots ===
The main subplot of the film concerns the search for a missing child. Elizabeth Blue comes to Jesse asking for help investigating the disappearance of her baby boy. The case was widely publicized seven years earlier as the disappearance of "Little Boy Blue." A body was found with the baby’s hospital wrist band, but the mother is convinced it was not her son, and even left her husband over the matter. Her conviction comes from a letter she received two years earlier postmarked Paradise that says "Your child is loved." Jesse feels compassionate towards the grieving mother, but believes the child is probably dead after all these years and that the letter could have been from anyone.

Deputy Rose Gammon disagrees and begins investigating on her own. Jesse fears investigating a cold case from New Mexico will make things even worse with the town council, but he does not stop her. Rose reaches a dead end after investigating all of the seven-year-old children in the town. But then Deputy Luther "Suitcase" Simpson suggests that the person may have left town after writing that letter two years ago and that Rose should be checking school records from two years ago. She does this and is led to Stephanie Morton. They discover that Morton had a baby boy the same time that Baby Blue was born, but that he died at birth. No one knew that the baby died, because Morton went on vacation to New Mexico right after the birth. There, she kidnapped Baby Boy Blue and brought him home, passing him off as her own unbeknownst to anyone else. She left her dead baby in the New Mexico desert with the stolen Baby Boy Blue’s hospital wrist band on. Jesse and Rose go to Morton’s house to confront her with what they now know, but they discover that Little Boy Blue died two years earlier in an ice skating incident. He was skating and wandered out onto thin ice, broke through and died. Morton suffered hypothermia trying to rescue him, but was unable to save him. That is when she sent the letter to Baby Boy Blue’s mother. Upon returning to the police station, Jesse finds that he has been suspended without pay pending an investigation. Not wanting Elizabeth to hear the news from the media, Rose and Suitcase agree not to arrest Morton until Jesse can tell Baby Boy Blue's mother personally. The film ends with Jesse traveling to New Mexico to give Elizabeth the news.

== Cast ==
- Tom Selleck as Jesse Stone
- Kathy Baker as Deputy Rose Gammon
- Kohl Sudduth as Deputy Luther "Suitcase" Simpson
- Leslie Hope as Internal Affairs Officer Sidney Greenstreet
- Stephen McHattie as State Homicide Commander Healy
- William Devane as Dr. Dix
- Jessica Hecht as Stephanie Morton
- Joanna Miles as Mrs. Steinberg
- Fulvio Cecere as Teddy Leaf
- Camryn Manheim as Elizabeth Blue
- William Sadler as Gino Fish
- Kerri Smith as Sister Mary John
- John Beale as Dr. Perkins
- Jeremy Akerman as Councilman Carter Hansen
- Joe the Dog as Reggie
- Gary Levert as William Butler
- Todd Hofley as Alan
- Tom Gallant as Councilman Comden
- Glen Lefchak as Homeless Guy
- Brian Heighton as Boston Doctor
- Gil Anderson as Jenn (voice)
- Janice Langille woman on bus reading

== Production ==
The film was shot in Halifax, Nova Scotia, Canada

== Reception ==
=== Awards and nominations ===
- 2009 American Society of Cinematographers Award for Outstanding Achievement in Cinematography (Rene Ohashi)
- 2010 Canadian Society of Cinematographers Award for Best Cinematography in TV Drama (Rene Ohashi)
