= Stone Cold (Parker novel) =

Novel by Robert B. Parker

- First edition
- Author: Robert B. Parker
- Language: English
- Series: Jesse Stone
- Genre: Crime fiction
- Publisher: Putnam
- Publication date: 2003
- Publication place: United States
- ISBN: 978-0-399-15087-6
- Preceded by: Death in Paradise
- Followed by: Sea Change

Stone Cold is a crime novel by Robert B. Parker, the fourth in his Jesse Stone series.

== Plot summary ==
A couple of middle-aged thrill killers, Brianna and Anthony Lincoln, are independently wealthy from a patent Anthony obtained for an optical scanner he invented while practicing medicine. The couple move to Paradise and begin picking random people and murdering them by simultaneously shooting them in the heart with .22 caliber pistols. They then make love while watching videos of the murders.

Kenneth Eisley is the first victim; Jesse does not discover his identity until after some investigation, and finds his dog. The Lincolns then stalk and kill a woman in a supermarket, and Jesse has the license plate numbers collected from all cars present at the scene. Next the Lincolns murder a man behind a church as he walks home from the train station. Two teenage boys stumble on the body while skateboarding and notice a red 1995 Saab.

With the help of the state police, Jesse finds all people who have both registered .22s and a red 1995 Saab, and checks if there was a red Saab at the supermarket. This leads Jesse to the Lincolns. Jesse briefly interviews the Lincolns, who seem very interested in the murders. He takes their .22 rifle for testing, but it has never been fired. However, he leaves convinced they are the killers.

The murderers then stalk Abby Taylor. Although Abby is considering marrying another man, she still has feelings for Jesse. After spending an evening with Jesse and making love to him, she returns home and is murdered by the Lincolns. They begin stalking and taking photos of Jesse, who learns of this while tailing them one night when they stop at his condo to take photos.

He writes about Jesse in the third person rather than from Spenser's first-person point of view, and this gives him some options he doesn't have in the Spenser novels. He introduces the serial killers as early as page one, and we follow their plans as they tilt against Jesse. They are smart and they don't make mistakes. Well, they do; they assume that they are smarter than he

— Boston Globe

Flirting with getting caught, and hoping to prove how smart they are —and how dumb the police are— the Lincolns invite Jesse to lunch. They probe him about the murders, but he reveals little. Later, a note is delivered to the police station telling Jesse to come to Paradise Mall at 7pm to learn about the murders. Believing they intend to murder him, Jesse stations officers at the mall and goes wearing a bullet-proof vest. As he approaches the elevator in the food court he is confronted by the Lincolns as they exit it, and they both shoot him in the chest and re-enter the elevator. Jesse bounds up the escalator, but the elevator descends again. When they exit, they have changed clothes. Officer Anthony D'Angelo thinks he recognizes the woman and stops her; she turns and shoots him in the head, killing him instantly. They escape in a rented Volvo.

Feeling guilty for D'Angelo's murder, which he believes could have been prevented had he involved the state police, Jesse trudges on with the case. He took it personally after Abby's murder, and wanted to catch the killers without the state police. They obtain a search warrant for the Lincolns' rented penthouse condo and find pictures of the victims on their computer, and the abandoned Saab. Jesse's ex-wife Jenn wonders how they got to the mall without their car, which leads Jesse to check car rentals and match them with names of people who patented optical scanners. One was rented on the day of the murder to Arlington Larmont: Anthony Lincoln was an alias. Jesse discovers that the car was dropped off in Toronto, and the state police find the couple registered at a Toronto hotel, where they are picked up by local police. Jesse drives up to confront the couple, who play dumb. Jesse responds by kneeing Arlington in the groin. When his wife jumps up to defend her husband, Jesse slaps her, then leaves.

== Subplots ==
The main subplot involves the gang rape of a 16-year-old girl. Candace Pennington first comes to Jesse with her mother after the rape, but she refuses to speak of it. Her mother takes her home after learning that Candace will have to testify, fearing her daughter will become the object of a public scandal. However, Molly makes it her mission to catch the perpetrators. She stakes out the school and sees three boys harassing Candace and showing her something. Jesse talks with Candace alone, who admits she was raped and tells him who did it. She pleads with Jesse not to reveal that she told, as she is scared what they will do. She reveals that they took nude photos of her and threatened to show them around school if she told. Jesse promises not to reveal that she told, but determines to discover their involvement by other means.

Posing as the bus driver, Molly arrests Bo Marino for smoking dope. During Bo's interrogation, Chief Stone finds the nude photos in Bo's backpack of a crying Candace being held down. Kevin Feeney is seen clearly in one of the photos, so Jesse brings him in. Kevin admits to it and implicates Troy Drake. During a meeting with Candace, her father, Bo, and his father, Candace's father attacks Bo. When Bo's father tries to defend his son, Mr. Pennington knocks him out. Jesse does nothing to stop it, and later states that Bo first attacked Mr. Pennington, who only tried to defend himself. The Marino's threaten to sue, but their lawyer, who is romantically involved with Jesse, convinces them to drop the suit. The boys are sentenced to three years probation and 120 hours community service, since they are minors and first time offenders. Dissatisfied, Jesse convinces the lawyers to get them assigned to him for their community service, and puts them to work around the station. Later he gives the first murder victim's dog to Candace before she and her family move away.

As in the other novels in the series, Jesse has several romantic relationships. He continues to see Marcy Campbell, and sees Abby once before her murder. He begins to see the Marino's lawyer, Rita Fiore, and they start to fall in love. The novel begins with Jesse drinking again, but after getting drunk with Jenn at the beginning he stops drinking completely. Towards the beginning Jesse confronts Jenn and her date outside her office after she doesn't return his calls. He fantasizes about murdering her date and confesses this to his shrink. Jenn later tries to advance her career by using him to get exclusive information on the serial murders he is investigating. He refuses, and begins to think they are through, but at the end of the novel Jenn tells Jesse she is unhappy with anyone but him and says she is ready to see him monogamously, to which Jesse agrees.

== Film adaptation ==
Tom Selleck stars as Jesse Stone in a series of movie specials made by CBS starting with Stone Cold. Although Stone Cold is the fourth novel in the series, it was the first novel in the series to be adapted into a film, and contains significant differences. First, his relationship with Jenn is still relegated to phone calls, they do not reconcile at the end, and Jesse does not stop drinking. It appears that Jenn has moved to Boston to be the weather girl as she is in the novel, and asks if she can come see him, however Jesse says he does not have time for her and she is never seen on screen. She also asks for exclusive coverage of the murders as she did in the novel which he denies. In the film, Jesse is seeing Abby exclusively prior to her murder. More importantly, in the finale, Jesse sets up the Lincolns at a house where Brianna shoots him with both guns. Jesse then shoots and kills Brianna and then demands that her husband pick up the guns. He refuses and states that he never killed anyone and won't get the death penalty for being an accomplice. The shootout does not take place in a mall as in the novel, and Officer D'Angelo is not murdered.

== Reception ==
The Boston Globe was pleased with the book, saying that "Parker is in roaring good form". Entertainment Weekly noted that "as always, he renders the action in prose as clear and potent as a fine vodka.". The Sydney Morning Herald argued that "Probably the best thing about the Stone series is Parker's refusal to turn his new protagonist into a stereotype."

== See also ==
- Rotten Tomatoes film review
