= David Gribble =

Australian cinematographer

David Gribble is an Australian cinematographer and director of photography based in New South Wales. He has also worked in the United States, filming TV movies and other works.

In 2010 he was nominated for an American Society of Cinematographers Award for Outstanding Achievement in Cinematography, category Motion Picture/Miniseries Television, for his filming of Jesse Stone: No Remorse (2010), made for American TV.

== Filmography ==
As cinematographer, unless otherwise noted:

- Private Collection (1972)
- The Man from Hong Kong (1975) (camera operator)
- Paradise (1975) (TV film) (director of photography)
- Polly My Love (1975) (TV film)
- Out of It (1997)
- The F.J. Holden (1977)
- The Best of Friends (1981)
- Monkey Grip (1982)
- Running on Empty (1982)
- Fast Talking (1984)
- Love Is Never Silent (1985) (Hallmark Hall of Fame)
- Adam: His Song Continues (1986) (TV film)
- American Harvest (1987) (TV film)
- High Tide (1987) (additional director of photography)
- Off Limits (1988)
- Tap (1989)
- Cadillac Man (1990) (director of photography)
- Fires Within (1991) (director of photography)
- Nowhere to Run (1993) (director of photography)
- The Quest (1996)
- Chill Factor (1999)
- The 13th Warrior (1999) (additional camera operator, additional director of photography)
- Crooked Earth (2001)
- Ike: Countdown to D-Day (2004) (TV film)
- The World's Fastest Indian (2005)
- Jesse Stone: Night Passage (2006) (TV film)
- Jesse Stone: Death in Paradise (2006) (TV film)
- Jesse Stone: No Remorse (2010) (TV film)
- Talking with Dog (in production)
