= Jesse Stone: Night Passage =

2006 American made-for-TV crime drama film directed by Robert Harmon

- DVD cover
- Genre: Crime film
- Based on: Night Passage by Robert B. Parker
- Screenplay by: Tom Epperson
- Directed by: Robert Harmon
- Starring: Tom Selleck; Saul Rubinek; Viola Davis
- Music by: Jeff Beal
- Country of origin: United States
- Original language: English

Production
- Producer: Steven J. Brandman
- Cinematography: David Gribble
- Editor: Chris Peppe
- Running time: 89 minutes
- Production companies: Sony Pictures Television; Brandman Productions

Original release
- Network: CBS
- Release: January 15, 2006

Jesse Stone: Night Passage is a 2006 American made-for-television crime drama film, directed by Robert Harmon and starring Tom Selleck, Saul Rubinek, and Viola Davis. Based on the 1997 novel Night Passage by Robert B. Parker—the first novel in the Jesse Stone series—the film is about a former Los Angeles homicide detective who is hired as the police chief of a small New England town and finds himself immersed in a series of mysteries. Filmed on location in Nova Scotia, the story is set in the fictitious town of Paradise, Massachusetts.

Jesse Stone: Night Passage is the second in a series of nine television films based on Parker's Jesse Stone novels. The film first aired on the CBS television network January 15, 2006.

== Plot ==
One moonlit night in Santa Monica, California, former LAPD homicide detective Jesse Stone (Tom Selleck) looks out at the ocean, waiting to sober up before driving across the country with his dog Boomer to the small coastal town of Paradise, Massachusetts, where he has been offered the position of police chief. Forced to resign from the LAPD for drinking on duty, Jesse knows that the Paradise job is his last chance. From a motel in Missouri, he calls his ex-wife, actress Jenn Stone, with whom he still talks regularly despite their divorce. Jesse's drinking problem became serious after he discovered that she was having an affair with her producer.

Meanwhile, Hastings "Hasty" Hathaway (Saul Rubinek), a wealthy banker and corrupt town council chair in Paradise, orchestrates the 'retirement' and a secret $50,000 payoff of the previous police chief, Lou Carson (Mike Starr), who has known about Hathaway's money laundering operation. Carson accepts the payoff, planning to 'throw a fishing rod in the car' and drive off to who knows where. Hathaway offered Jesse the position thinking that he was a drunk and a loser, who could easily be manipulated.

Jesse arrives in Paradise and checks into the Paradise Motel. Following a night of drinking and another frustrating phone call with his ex-wife, Jesse shows up to his formal job interview with a hangover, but is still offered the job. Jesse is suspicious of why he is hired and why his predecessor retired. As the new police chief, Jesse takes over the Paradise Police Department, which consists of dispatcher Molly Crane (Viola Davis) and officers Luther "Suitcase" Simpson (Note: When Luther asks Jesse why he chose "Suitcase" as his nickname, Jesse tells him the name is from Harry "Suitcase" Simpson, a baseball player who was traded frequently.) (Kohl Sudduth) and Anthony D'Angelo (Vito Rezza) who calls him 'Skipper'. While responding to a domestic dispute, Jesse meets Joe Genest (Stephen Baldwin), a thug who assists Boston gangsters in a money laundering operation and also provides muscle for Hathaway. Mrs. Genest (Liisa Repo-Martell) has a restraining order against her husband, Joe. During the confrontation Joe Genest taunts Stone that the restraining order is worthless - his expensive lawyers can easily have it set aside in favour of a new one. Stone suddenly kicks him in the groin then, whilst Genest is lying face down on the floor in agony, calmly relates what more he will do to him if any harm comes to Mrs. Genest.

The next day, Jesse receives a visit from the attractive town attorney, Abby Taylor (Polly Shannon), who sits on the board of selectmen or town council. She chastises him for assaulting Genest, but is unable to convince him that his actions were inappropriate. Jesse asks her to dinner and she accepts. In the coming days they develop a physical relationship, albeit one involving genuine affection. She is aware that Jesse is still tied emotionally to his ex-wife and is sensitive to his drinking problem.

Meanwhile, Genest, concerned that Carson will talk about the money laundering operation, follows the former police chief in a truck and bulldozes his car off a cliff, killing him. Later Genest tells Hathaway about the killing and demands half of the money laundering profits. Now an accomplice to murder, Hathaway has to agree. Genest also begins a campaign of harassment against Jesse, vandalizing his police car and following him around town. Jesse receives a visit from state homicide inspector Captain Healy (Stephen McHattie) who informs him of Carson's death. The men share a background in homicide, baseball and drinking. Healy believes it was an accident - Carson had traces of alcohol in his blood - but Jesse tells him he suspects otherwise.

Jesse rents a small house on the ocean from realtor Cissy Hathaway (Stephanie March) who is Hasty's wife. A few days later, Jesse and Abby attend a fundraiser at the yacht club hosted by the Hathaways. Cissy makes overt passes at Jesse in front of her husband. The next day, at a charity festival, Jesse and Abby see Genest flirting with Cissy Hathaway, leading Jesse to speculate they are having an affair. When Jesse asks Genest if he's heard about Carson's death, he says he has an alibi, even without knowing the time or details of the death. Later Jesse confirms with Luther that Genest is having an affair with Cissy (Luther eventually admitting to being her previous suitor). Sometime later, Jesse and Molly follow Genest to Hathaway's home and observe him delivering what appears to be a large sports bag filled with money. When Molly reveals that Hathaway forced Carson to resign, Jesse tells her he believes Genest killed Carson to silence him about the money laundering operation. Healy later confirms that investigations show Carson's car was pushed off the cliff. Jesse shares his suspicions about Genest, whom Healy reveals works as a bagman for a Boston mobster, and is also suspected of involvement in a number of Mob murders. He warns Jesse to 'be careful.'

After observing that his dog Boomer has not been eating, Jesse takes him to the vet who confirms the aging animal is seriously ill and should be put down. A few days later, knowing there is little hope for the dog who has been his companion since he was a pup, Jesse asks the local pediatrician, Doctor Perkins (John Beale), to perform the task. That night, after several drinks, Jesse watches as Boomer is euthanised.

Knowing Carson's murder happened on his watch and that he must do something, Jesse sets in motion a plan to capture the killer. He tells Hasty that Healy's investigation found that Carson was murdered and that the chief suspect is Genest. Jesse also reveals that Genest is having an affair with his wife Cissy, knowing it would trigger his jealousy. Later, Hasty rings Jesse to arrange to meet him privately after dark at a remote dock, ostensibly to discuss these revelations. However, he has arranged for Genest to take his place, and to kill Jesse. That night, Jesse arrives and is soon approached by Genest who pulls a gun and prepares to shoot him. Suddenly, Genest is shot dead by Hasty who steps out from the shadows saying, "That's one way of keeping him away from my wife." Hasty then picks up Genest's gun and prepares to shoot Jesse, but is stopped by Luther who has him covered from above. Hasty realizes he is in a hopeless situation, puts down the gun and surrenders. (Note: Hathaway murders Genest with Jesse's police revolver, which he stole earlier. He had planned to murder Jesse and make it look like Jesse and Genest killed each other.)

Later that night after informing Mrs. Genest and her daughter about Joe's death, Mrs. Genest tells him, "You should've done something to stop it." Jesse returns to another dock alone and leans back reflectively against a door frame whilst a ship passes.

== Cast ==
- Tom Selleck as Jesse Stone
- Saul Rubinek as Hastings "Hasty" Hathaway
- Viola Davis as Molly Crane
- Kohl Sudduth as Luther "Suitcase" Simpson
- Polly Shannon as Abby Taylor
- Mike Starr as Lou Carson
- Britt Robertson as Michelle Genest
- Liisa Repo-Martell as Carole Genest
- Stephen McHattie as Captain Healy
- John Beale as Dr. Perkins
- Vito Rezza as Anthony D'Angelo
- Stephanie March as Cissy Hathaway
- Stephen Baldwin as Joe Genest
- Maria Brooks as Sandy
- McKenzi Scott as Tammy
- Brian Jamieson as Truck Driver
- Christie MacFadyen as Veterinarian
- Gil Anderson as Jenn Stone (voice)
- Bill Meuse as Native Man #1
- Agumeuay Nakanakis as Native Man #2
- Mike Turner as Cop

== Production ==
=== Filming locations ===
- Blue Rocks, Nova Scotia, Canada
- Halifax, Nova Scotia, Canada
- Lunenburg, Nova Scotia, Canada

=== Adaptation ===
This second film in the series differs from the novel in several ways. In the film, Hasty is a money launderer portrayed as an unwilling accomplice in the other crimes; in the novel, he is a hard-nosed extremist who orchestrates the murder. In the film, the characters of Lou Burke and Tom Carson are combined into the single character Lou Carson. In the film, Genest murders Carson on his own in an attempt to extort more money from Hathaway; in the novel, Hathaway orders Carson's killing. In the film, Genest uses a van to push Carson's car off the cliff; in the novel, Genest throws him off the cliff. In the film, Luther is given the nickname "Suitcase" or "Suit" by Jesse; in the novel the nickname is given by his high school coach. In the film, Jesse is shown drinking Johnnie Walker Red Label; in the novel he drinks Black Label.

In the film, black police officer Molly is an important member of Jesse's force; in the novel, it is noted several times that there are no black people in Paradise. In the film, the character of Tammy Portugal and the Freedom's Horsemen are omitted completely; in the novel, they play important roles. In the film, Jenn's role is relegated to a few short phone calls; in the novel, her role is more prominent and she comes to Paradise in the end.

The film pays homage to The Magnificent Seven and Yul Brynner when he stops in New Mexico. When asked where he is from, he points behind himself. When asked where he is going, he points forward. This is exactly like the scene from The Magnificent Seven.

In the film, Jesse is not drunk at his job interview. He notes several times that he had too much to drink the night before, and made the mistake of having one scotch in the morning to "steady himself". In the novel, the initial interview takes place in Chicago, well before Jesse travels to Paradise, and Jesse is extremely intoxicated. In the film, Jesse has an old dog named Boomer that he must put down; in the novel (or any of the Jesse Stone novels), he does not own a dog. In the film, Jesse recruits the local pediatrician as medical examiner; in the novel, the police department already employs a medical examiner. Finally, in the film, Jesse buys an old house on the water; in the novel, he lives in a condo on the beach.

== Reception ==
In his review on DVD Verdict, Appellate Judge James A. Stewart wrote, "Everything about the crime drama plot plays out predictably." Stewart applauded Selleck's performance as the reason for the film's success:

The best thing about Jesse Stone: Night Passage is Tom Selleck's performance. He builds on his Magnum persona and the goodwill that comes with it to make you root for Jesse Stone. Standard character moments, such as when Stone tells jokes to his dog but only points when asked questions at a pit stop or when he has a pay phone conversation with his ex, manage to be believable, likable, and touching. It doesn't hurt that the older Selleck looks like a seedy wreck as well. He makes the movie easy to watch, even when the dramatic tension's lacking, which is pretty much most of the time.

Stewart also noted, "There is one other area in which Night Passage delivers: scenery. While there's some standard camera work in here at times, the production takes the time to pan some stunning vistas. How often does a murder scene just look beautiful?"

In his review on DVD Talk, Paul Mavis was "more than pleasantly surprised by this solid, no-frills made-for-TV movie." Mavis wrote:

Jesse Stone: Night Passage surprised me with its cool, laid-back, laconic construction and direction. Directed by pro Robert Harmon, who ... keeps Jesse Stone: Night Passage in a deliberate, methodical, and meditative groove, ticking off his dramatic scenes like a well-measured metronome. There's a real feeling of a professional "B" flick at work here - but not in the demeaning way in which that term is misunderstood today. Jesse Stone: Night Passage is the opposite of schlock; this is a "B" programmer in the manner of films like He Walked by Night or The Narrow Margin: professional, tightly organized with little if any narrative fat, and a cold, clean approach in the direction and the acting that's refreshing in this world of 100 million dollar special effects spent on 98 cent stories.

Mavis went on to note that although the film "isn't necessarily surprising in its actual mystery; the killer is revealed early, and the denouement is familiar," what works well is "the sustained atmosphere that Harmon and screenwriter Tom Epperson ... manage, a downbeat, hard-boiled, yet surprisingly compassionate take on the stereotypical hard-assed alcoholic detective character." Mavis also applauded Selleck's performance, writing:

Selleck, who I've always found to be a better actor than he's generally given credit for, is letter-perfect for this kind of role. The extreme handsomeness of his youth has given way to ... still more handsomeness, but now it's an older, craggy, Clark Gable look, and with it comes an authority, an assurance and confidence that perfectly suits the Jesse Stone character. His acting here is pared down to the absolute basics, but his choices are always correct. It's a marvelous performance, and without it, Jesse Stone: Night Passage would drift away into pointless genre work.

Finally, Mavis praised David Gribble's cinematography which "rivals anything I've seen on the big screen this year," Jeff Beal's "hypnotic score", and Chris Peppe's "tight, sharp editing".

== See also ==
- Night Passage (Parker novel)
