= List of book titles taken from literature =

Many authors will use quotations from literature as the title for their works. This may be done as a conscious allusion to the themes of the older work or simply because the phrase seems memorable. The following is a partial list of book titles taken from literature. It does not include phrases altered for parody.

Work	Author	Literary reference
Absalom, Absalom!	William Faulkner	Bible: 2 Samuel 19:4
An Acceptable Time	Madeleine L'Engle	Bible: Psalm 66:13
A che punto è la notte (literally, "At which point is the night")	Carlo Fruttero and Franco Lucentini	Bible: Isaiah 21:11
After Many a Summer Dies the Swan	Aldous Huxley	Alfred, Lord Tennyson, "Tithonus"
Ah, Wilderness!	Eugene O'Neill	Edward FitzGerald (trans.), Rubaiyat of Omar Khayyam
Alien Corn (play)	Sidney Howard	John Keats, "Ode to a Nightingale"
"The Alien Corn" (short story)	W. Somerset Maugham	John Keats, "Ode to a Nightingale"
All the King's Men	Robert Penn Warren	Anon., "Humpty Dumpty"
All Passion Spent	Vita Sackville-West	John Milton, Samson Agonistes
Alone on a Wide, Wide Sea	Michael Morpurgo	Samuel Taylor Coleridge, The Rime of the Ancient Mariner
Anglo-Saxon Attitudes	Angus Wilson	Lewis Carroll, Through the Looking-Glass
Antic Hay	Aldous Huxley	Christopher Marlowe, Edward II
Arms and the Man	George Bernard Shaw	Virgil, Aeneid
As I Lay Dying	William Faulkner	Homer, Odyssey
Beautiful World, Where Are You	Sally Rooney	Friedrich Schiller, "The Gods of Greece"
Behold the Man	Michael Moorcock	Bible: John 19:5
Beneath the Bleeding	Val McDermid	T. S. Eliot, East Coker
Beyond the Mexique Bay	Aldous Huxley	Andrew Marvell, "Bermudas"
Blithe Spirit	Noël Coward	Percy Bysshe Shelley, "To a Skylark"
Blood's a Rover	James Ellroy	A. E. Housman, A Shropshire Lad, Poem IV ("Reveille")
Blue Remembered Earth	Alastair Reynolds	A. E. Housman, A Shropshire Lad, Poem XL
Blue Remembered Hills	Rosemary Sutcliff	A. E. Housman, A Shropshire Lad, Poem XL
Bonjour Tristesse	Françoise Sagan	Paul Éluard, "À Peine Défigurée"
Brandy of the Damned	Colin Wilson	George Bernard Shaw, Man and Superman
Burning Bright	Tracy Chevalier	William Blake, "The Tyger"
Burning Bright	John Steinbeck	William Blake, "The Tyger"
Bury My Heart at Wounded Knee	Dee Brown	Stephen Vincent Benét, "American Names"
Butter In a Lordly Dish	Agatha Christie	Bible: Judges 5:25
By Grand Central Station I Sat Down and Wept	Elizabeth Smart	Bible: Psalm 137:1
Cabbages and Kings	O. Henry	Lewis Carroll, Through the Looking-Glass ("The Walrus and the Carpenter")
The Camp of the Saints	Jean Raspail	Bible: Revelation 20:9
Captains Courageous	Rudyard Kipling	traditional "The ballad of Mary Ambree"
Careless People	Sarah Wynn-Williams	F. Scott Fitzgerald, The Great Gatsby
Carrion Comfort	Dan Simmons	Gerard Manley Hopkins, "Carrion Comfort"
A Catskill Eagle	Robert B. Parker	Herman Melville, Moby-Dick
The Children of Men	P. D. James	Bible: Psalm 90:3
Clouds of Witness	Dorothy L. Sayers	Bible: Hebrews 12:1
Cometh Up as a Flower	Rhoda Broughton	Bible: Job 14:2
A Confederacy of Dunces	John Kennedy Toole	Jonathan Swift, Thoughts on Various Subjects, Moral and Diverting
Consider the Lilies	Iain Crichton Smith	Bible: Matthew 6:28
Consider Phlebas	Iain M. Banks	T. S. Eliot, The Waste Land
Cover Her Face	P. D. James	John Webster, The Duchess of Malfi
The Cricket on the Hearth	Charles Dickens	John Milton, Il Penseroso
The Curious Incident of the Dog in the Night-Time	Mark Haddon	Arthur Conan Doyle, "The Adventure of Silver Blaze"
The Daffodil Sky	H. E. Bates	Alfred, Lord Tennyson, "Maud"
Dance Dance Dance	Haruki Murakami	W. H. Auden, "Death's Echo"
A Darkling Plain	Philip Reeve	Matthew Arnold, "Dover Beach"
Darkness Visible	William Golding	John Milton, Paradise Lost
Darkness Visible	Walton Hannah	John Milton, Paradise Lost
Darkness Visible: A Study of Vergil's Aeneid	W. R. Johnson	John Milton, Paradise Lost
Darkness Visible	William Styron	John Milton, Paradise Lost
Death Be Not Proud	John Gunther	John Donne, Holy Sonnets X
Devices and Desires	P. D. James	Book of Common Prayer
The Doors of Perception	Aldous Huxley	William Blake, The Marriage of Heaven and Hell
Down to a Sunless Sea	Lin Carter	Samuel Taylor Coleridge, Kubla Khan
Down to a Sunless Sea	David Graham	Samuel Taylor Coleridge, Kubla Khan
Drive Your Plow Over the Bones of the Dead	Olga Tokarczuk	William Blake, The Marriage of Heaven and Hell
"Dulce et Decorum est"	Wilfred Owen	Horace, Odes iii 2.13
Dying of the Light	George R. R. Martin	Dylan Thomas, "Do not go gentle into that good night"
East Is East	T. C. Boyle	Rudyard Kipling, "The Ballad of East and West"
East of Eden	John Steinbeck	Bible: Genesis 4:16
Ego Dominus Tuus	W. B. Yeats	Dante, La Vita Nuova
Endless Night	Agatha Christie	William Blake, "Auguries of Innocence"
England's Green	Zuffar Kunial	William Blake, "And did those feet in ancient time"
Everything is Illuminated	Jonathan Safran Foer	Milan Kundera, The Unbearable Lightness of Being
An Evil Cradling	Brian Keenan	Quran 13:18 (trans. Arthur John Arberry)
Except the Lord	Joyce Cary	Bible: Psalm 127:1
Eyeless in Gaza	Aldous Huxley	John Milton, Samson Agonistes
Fair Stood the Wind for France	H. E. Bates	Michael Drayton, Ballad of Agincourt
Fame Is the Spur	Howard Spring	John Milton, "Lycidas"
A Fanatic Heart	Edna O'Brien	W. B. Yeats, "Remorse for Intemperate Speech"
A Far Better Thing	H. G. Parry	Charles Dickens, A Tale of Two Cities
Far From the Madding Crowd	Thomas Hardy	Thomas Gray, Elegy Written in a Country Churchyard
The Far-Distant Oxus	Katharine Hull and Pamela Whitlock	Matthew Arnold, Sohrab and Rustum
A Farewell to Arms	Ernest Hemingway	George Peele, "A Farewell to Arms (To Queen Elizabeth)"
Fear and Trembling	Søren Kierkegaard	Bible: Philippians 2:12
Fearful Symmetry	Northrop Frye	William Blake, "The Tyger"
The Female of the Species	H. C. McNeile	Rudyard Kipling, "The Female of the Species"
A Fine and Private Place	Peter S. Beagle	Andrew Marvell, "To His Coy Mistress"
For a Breath I Tarry	Roger Zelazny	A. E. Housman, A Shropshire Lad, Poem XXXII
For Whom the Bell Tolls	Ernest Hemingway	John Donne, Meditation XVII
Frequent Hearses	Edmund Crispin	Alexander Pope, "Elegy to the Memory of an Unfortunate Lady"
From Here to Eternity	James Jones	Rudyard Kipling, "Gentlemen-Rankers"
Generation of Vipers	Philip Wylie	Bible: Matthew 3:7, etc.
The Getting of Wisdom	Henry Handel Richardson	Bible: Proverbs 4:7
A Glass of Blessings	Barbara Pym	George Herbert, "The Pulley"
The Glory and the Dream	William Manchester	William Wordsworth, "Ode: Intimations of Immortality"
The Gods Themselves	Isaac Asimov	Friedrich Schiller, The Maid of Orleans
The Golden Apples of the Sun	Ray Bradbury	W. B. Yeats, "The Song of the Wandering Angus"
The Golden Bowl	Henry James	Bible: Ecclesiastes 12:6
Gone with the Wind	Margaret Mitchell	Ernest Dowson, "Non sum qualis eram bonae sub regno Cynara"
The Grapes of Wrath	John Steinbeck	Julia Ward Howe, "Battle Hymn of the Republic"
Great Work of Time	John Crowley	Andrew Marvell, "An Horatian Ode upon Cromwell's Return from Ireland"
The Green Bay Tree	Louis Bromfield	Bible: Psalm 37:35
A Handful of Dust	Evelyn Waugh	T. S. Eliot, The Waste Land
Happy Families Are All Alike	Peter Taylor	Leo Tolstoy, Anna Karenina
Have His Carcase	Dorothy L. Sayers	Homer, Iliad (trans. William Cowper)
The Heart Is Deceitful Above All Things	JT LeRoy	Bible: Jeremiah 17:9
The Heart Is a Lonely Hunter	Carson McCullers	William Sharp, "The Lonely Hunter"
His Dark Materials	Philip Pullman	John Milton, Paradise Lost
Horseman, Pass By	Larry McMurtry	W. B. Yeats, "Under Ben Bulben"
The House of Mirth	Edith Wharton	Bible: Ecclesiastes 7:4
How Doth the Little Crocodile?	Anthony and Peter Shaffer	Lewis Carroll, Alice's Adventures in Wonderland ("How Doth the Little Crocodile")
How Sleep the Brave	H. E. Bates	William Collins, "How Sleep the Brave"
How Sleep the Brave	John Briley	William Collins, "How Sleep the Brave"
How Sleep the Brave	James H. Hunter	William Collins, "How Sleep the Brave"
Human Voices	Penelope Fitzgerald	T. S. Eliot, "The Love Song of J. Alfred Prufrock"
I Know Why the Caged Bird Sings	Maya Angelou	Paul Laurence Dunbar, "Sympathy"
I Sing the Body Electric!	Ray Bradbury	Walt Whitman, "I Sing the Body Electric"
I Will Fear No Evil	Robert A. Heinlein	Bible: Psalm 23:4
If I Forget Thee Jerusalem	William Faulkner	Bible: Psalm 137:5
If Not Now, When?	Primo Levi	Pirkei Avot 1:13
Ill Fares the Land	Tony Judt	Oliver Goldsmith, The Deserted Village
Ill Fares the Land: Migrants and Migratory Labor in the United States	Carey McWilliams	Oliver Goldsmith, The Deserted Village
In Death Ground	David Weber and Steve White	Sun Tzu, The Art of War
In a Dry Season	Peter Robinson	T. S. Eliot, "Gerontion"
In Dubious Battle	John Steinbeck	John Milton, Paradise Lost
In the Forests of the Night	Amelia Atwater-Rhodes	William Blake, "The Tyger"
In a Glass Darkly	Sheridan Le Fanu	Bible: 1 Corinthians 13:12
An Instant in the Wind	André Brink	Hart Crane, "The Broken Tower"
It's a Battlefield	Graham Greene	Alexander William Kinglake, The Invasion of the Crimea, Vol. 6
Jacob Have I Loved	Katherine Paterson	Bible: Romans 9:13
Jesting Pilate	Aldous Huxley	Francis Bacon, Of Truth
The Kingdom of God Is Within You	Leo Tolstoy	Bible: Luke 17:21
The Last Enemy	Richard Hillary	Bible: 1 Corinthians 15:26
The Last Temptation	Val McDermid	T. S. Eliot, Murder in the Cathedral
The Lathe of Heaven	Ursula K. Le Guin	Zhuangzi, Book XXIII, paragraph 7
Let Us Now Praise Famous Men	James Agee	Bible: Ecclesiasticus 44:1
Lilies of the Field	William Edmund Barrett	Bible: Matthew 6:28
This Lime Tree Bower	Conor McPherson	Samuel Taylor Coleridge, "This Lime-Tree Bower My Prison"
The Line of Beauty	Alan Hollinghurst	William Hogarth, The Analysis of Beauty
Little Boy Lost	Marghanita Laski	William Blake, "The Little Boy Lost"/"A Little Boy Lost"
The Little Foxes	Lillian Hellman	Bible: Song of Songs 2:15
Little Hands Clapping	Dan Rhodes	Robert Browning, "The Pied Piper of Hamelin"
A Little Learning	Evelyn Waugh	Alexander Pope, An Essay on Criticism
The Longest Journey	E. M. Forster	Percy Bysshe Shelley, Epipsychidion
Look Homeward, Angel	Thomas Wolfe	John Milton, "Lycidas"
Look to Windward	Iain M. Banks	T. S. Eliot, The Waste Land
The Magic Mountain	Thomas Mann	Friedrich Nietzsche, The Birth of Tragedy
A Man's Reach	Elmer L. Andersen	Robert Browning, "Andrea del Sarto"
The Man Within	Graham Greene	Thomas Browne, Religio Medici
Many Waters	Madeleine L'Engle	Bible: Song of Songs 8:7
A Many-Splendoured Thing	Han Suyin	Francis Thompson, "The Kingdom of God"
The Mermaids Singing	Val McDermid	T. S. Eliot, "The Love Song of J. Alfred Prufrock"
The Millstone	Margaret Drabble	Bible: Matthew 18:6
The Mirror Crack'd from Side to Side	Agatha Christie	Alfred, Lord Tennyson, "The Lady of Shalott"
Moab Is My Washpot	Stephen Fry	Bible: Psalm 60:8
The Monkey's Raincoat	Robert Crais	Matsuo Bashō, Sarumino
Monstrous Regiment	Terry Pratchett	John Knox, The First Blast of the Trumpet Against the Monstrous Regiment of Women
A Monstrous Regiment of Women	Laurie R. King	John Knox, The First Blast of the Trumpet Against the Monstrous Regiment of Women
The Moon by Night	Madeleine L'Engle	Bible: Psalm 121:6
Mother Night	Kurt Vonnegut	Johann Wolfgang von Goethe, Faust, Part One
The Moving Finger	Agatha Christie	Edward FitzGerald (trans.), Rubaiyat of Omar Khayyam
The Moving Toyshop	Edmund Crispin	Alexander Pope, The Rape of the Lock
Mr Standfast	John Buchan	John Bunyan, The Pilgrim's Progress
Nectar in a Sieve	Kamala Markandaya	Samuel Taylor Coleridge, "Work without Hope"
The Needle's Eye	Margaret Drabble	Bible: Matthew 19:24
Nine Coaches Waiting	Mary Stewart	Cyril Tourneur, The Revenger's Tragedy
No Country for Old Men	Cormac McCarthy	W. B. Yeats, "Sailing to Byzantium"
No Highway	Nevil Shute	John Masefield, The Wanderer
No Longer at Ease	Chinua Achebe	T. S. Eliot, Journey of the Magi
Noli Me Tangere	José Rizal	Bible: John 20:17
Not Honour More	Joyce Cary	Richard Lovelace, "To Lucasta, Going to the Warres"
Now Sleeps the Crimson Petal	H. E. Bates	Alfred, Lord Tennyson, "Now Sleeps the Crimson Petal"
Number the Stars	Lois Lowry	Bible: Psalm 147:4
O Jerusalem!	Dominique Lapierre and Larry Collins	Bible: Psalm 137:5
O Pioneers!	Willa Cather	Walt Whitman, "Pioneers! O Pioneers!"
Of Human Bondage	W. Somerset Maugham	Baruch Spinoza, Ethics
Of Mice and Men	John Steinbeck	Robert Burns, "To a Mouse"
Oh! To be in England	H. E. Bates	Robert Browning, "Home Thoughts From Abroad"
"'Oh, Whistle, and I'll Come to You, My Lad'"	M. R. James	Robert Burns, "Oh, whistle and I'll come to you, my lad"
The Other Side of Silence	André Brink	George Eliot, Middlemarch
Out of Africa	Karen Blixen	Pliny the Elder, Historia Naturalis, 8, 6.
The Painted Veil	W. Somerset Maugham	Percy Bysshe Shelley, "Lift Not The Painted Veil Which Those Who Live"
Pale Kings and Princes	Robert B. Parker	John Keats, "La Belle Dame sans Merci"
The Parliament of Man	Paul Kennedy	Alfred, Lord Tennyson, "Locksley Hall"
Paths of Glory	Humphrey Cobb	Thomas Gray, Elegy Written in a Country Churchyard
A Passage to India	E. M. Forster	Walt Whitman, "Passage to India"
Poison Tree	Amelia Atwater-Rhodes	William Blake, "A Poison Tree"
The Poison Tree	Erin Kelly	William Blake, "A Poison Tree"
Postern of Fate	Agatha Christie	James Elroy Flecker, "The Gates of Damascus"
Precious Bane	Mary Webb	John Milton, Paradise Lost
The Proper Study	Isaac Asimov	Alexander Pope, An Essay on Man
Quo Vadis	Henryk Sienkiewicz	Bible: John 13:36 (Vulgate translation)
Recalled to Life	Reginald Hill	Charles Dickens, A Tale of Two Cities
Recalled to Life	Robert Silverberg	Charles Dickens, A Tale of Two Cities
Ring of Bright Water	Gavin Maxwell	Kathleen Raine, "The Marriage of Psyche"
The Road Less Traveled	M. Scott Peck	Robert Frost, "The Road Not Taken"
A Scanner Darkly	Philip K. Dick	Bible: 1 Corinthians 13:12
Seven Pillars of Wisdom	T. E. Lawrence	Bible: Proverbs 9:1
"Shall not Perish"	William Faulkner	Abraham Lincoln, Gettysburg Address
The Sick Rose	Erin Kelly	William Blake, "The Sick Rose"
The Skull Beneath the Skin	P. D. James	T. S. Eliot, "Whispers of Immortality"
The Soldier's Art	Anthony Powell	Robert Browning, "Childe Roland to the Dark Tower Came"
Some Buried Caesar	Rex Stout	Edward FitzGerald (trans.), Rubaiyat of Omar Khayyam
Specimen Days	Michael Cunningham	Walt Whitman's prosework
The Stars' Tennis Balls	Stephen Fry	John Webster, The Duchess of Malfi
Stranger in a Strange Land	Robert A. Heinlein	Bible: Exodus 2:22
"Such, Such Were the Joys"	George Orwell	William Blake, "The Echoing Green"
A Summer Bird-Cage	Margaret Drabble	John Webster, The White Devil
The Sun Also Rises	Ernest Hemingway	Bible: Ecclesiastes 1:5
Surprised by Joy	C. S. Lewis	William Wordsworth, "Surprised by Joy"
A Swiftly Tilting Planet	Madeleine L'Engle	Conrad Aiken, "Morning Song of Senlin"
Taming a Sea Horse	Robert B. Parker	Robert Browning, "My Last Duchess"
Tender Is the Night	F. Scott Fitzgerald	John Keats, "Ode to a Nightingale'"
Terrible Swift Sword	Bruce Catton	Julia Ward Howe, "Battle Hymn of the Republic"
That Good Night	N. J. Crisp	Dylan Thomas, "Do not go gentle into that good night"
That Hideous Strength	C. S. Lewis	David Lyndsay, Ane Dialog
Things Fall Apart	Chinua Achebe	W. B. Yeats, "The Second Coming"
This Side of Paradise	F. Scott Fitzgerald	Rupert Brooke, "Tiare Tahiti"
Those Barren Leaves	Aldous Huxley	William Wordsworth, "The Tables Turned"
Thrones, Dominations	Dorothy L. Sayers	John Milton, Paradise Lost
Tiger! Tiger! (alternative title of The Stars My Destination)	Alfred Bester	William Blake, "The Tyger"
"Tiger! Tiger!"	Rudyard Kipling	William Blake, "The Tyger"
Time and Chance	Kim Campbell	Bible: Ecclesiastes 9:11
Time and Chance: an Autobiography	L. Sprague de Camp	Bible: Ecclesiastes 9:11
Time and Chance	Sharon Kay Penman	Bible: Ecclesiastes 9:11
Time and Chance	Alma Timms	Bible: Ecclesiastes 9:11
A Time of Gifts	Patrick Leigh Fermor	Louis MacNeice, "Twelfth Night"
Time of our Darkness	Stephen Gray	Lawrence Binyon, "For the Fallen"
A Time to Kill	John Grisham	Bible: Ecclesiastes 3:3
Time To Murder And Create	Lawrence Block	T. S. Eliot, "The Love Song of J. Alfred Prufrock"
Tirra Lirra by the River	Jessica Anderson	Alfred, Lord Tennyson, "The Lady of Shalott"
To a God Unknown	John Steinbeck	Rigveda Book X
To Sail Beyond the Sunset	Robert A. Heinlein	Alfred, Lord Tennyson, "Ulysses"
To Say Nothing of the Dog	Connie Willis	Jerome K. Jerome, Three Men in a Boat
To Your Scattered Bodies Go	Philip José Farmer	John Donne, Holy Sonnets VIII
The Torment of Others	Val McDermid	T. S. Eliot, The Dry Salvages
Unweaving the Rainbow	Richard Dawkins	John Keats, "Lamia"
Vanity Fair	William Makepeace Thackeray	John Bunyan, The Pilgrim's Progress
"Vaster than Empires and More Slow"	Ursula K. Le Guin	Andrew Marvell, "To His Coy Mistress"
Vile Bodies	Evelyn Waugh	Bible: Philippians 3:21
The Violent Bear It Away	Flannery O'Connor	Bible: Matthew 11:12 (Douay translation)
The Vorpal Blade	Colin Forbes	Lewis Carroll, Through the Looking-Glass ("Jabberwocky")
The Wages of Sin	David A. McIntee	Bible: Romans 6:23
Waiting for the Barbarians	J. M. Coetzee	Constantine P. Cavafy, "Waiting for the Barbarians"
Wandering Recollections of a Somewhat Busy Life	John Neal	Horace Greeley, Recollections of a Busy Life
The Waste Land	T. S. Eliot	Jessie Weston, From Ritual to Romance
The Way of All Flesh	Samuel Butler	Bible: Joshua 23:14 (as rephrased in John Wesley's Explanatory Notes)
The Way Through the Woods	Colin Dexter	Rudyard Kipling, "The Way Through the Woods"
The Wealth of Nations	Adam Smith	Bible: Isaiah 61:6
What's Become of Waring	Anthony Powell	Robert Browning, "Waring"
When the Green Woods Laugh	H. E. Bates	William Blake, "Laughing Song"
Where Angels Fear to Tread	E. M. Forster	Alexander Pope, An Essay on Criticism
The Widening Gyre	Robert B. Parker	W. B. Yeats, "The Second Coming"
Wildfire at Midnight	Mary Stewart	Cyril Tourneur, The Revenger's Tragedy
The Wind's Twelve Quarters	Ursula K. Le Guin	A. E. Housman, A Shropshire Lad, Poem XXXII
The Wings of the Dove	Henry James	Bible: Psalm 55:6
The Wives of Bath	Susan Swan	Geoffrey Chaucer, The Wife of Bath's Prologue and Tale
World Enough, and Time	James Kahn	Andrew Marvell, "To His Coy Mistress"
World Enough and Time	Robert Penn Warren	Andrew Marvell, "To His Coy Mistress"
The World, the Flesh and the Devil	Mary Elizabeth Braddon	Book of Common Prayer
The Yellow Meads of Asphodel	H. E. Bates	Alexander Pope, "Ode on St. Cecilia's Day"

== Bibliography ==
- Gardner, Martin (1985). The Annotated Alice. Harmondsworth: Penguin.
