= Lullaby (Atkins novel) =

2012 novel by Ace Atkins

- First edition
- Author: Ace Atkins
- Language: English
- Series: Spenser
- Genre: Detective fiction
- Publisher: Putnam Adult
- Publication date: 2012
- Publication place: United States
- Media type: Print (hardback & paperback) and audio CD
- Pages: 320 pp
- ISBN: 0-399-15803-0
- Preceded by: Sixkill
- Followed by: Wonderland

Lullaby is the 41st novel featuring Robert B. Parker's fictional detective Spenser. It is the first official Spenser novel not written by Parker, but by Ace Atkins. Atkins was asked to write the novel after Parker's death in 2010.

== Plot ==
Mattie Sullivan, a fourteen-year-old girl, recruits Spenser to solve her mother's murder four years earlier. The man convicted of her murder, Mickey Green, was a friend of Mattie's mother and Mattie believes he was framed. When an old mob figure named Jumpin' Jack Flynn appears to be involved (along with Spenser's longtime enemies the Broz family), Spenser calls in Hawk and Vinnie Morris for back up.

== Recurring characters ==
- Spenser
- Hawk
- Dr. Susan Silverman, Ph.D
- Cpt. Martin Quirk, Boston Police Department
- Sgt. Frank Belson, Boston Police Department
- Vinnie Morris
- Gerry Broz
- Joe Broz

== Reception ==
Reviews for the first of Atkins' novels featuring Spenser were overwhelmingly positive. Most reviewers felt Atkins successfully imitated Parker's voice, pacing and the character's banter. They also praised the complexity of the plot.
