= Chasing the Bear =

2009 novel by Robert B. Parker

Chasing the Bear: A Young Spenser Novel
- Cover of the first edition
- Author: Robert B. Parker
- Language: English
- Series: Spenser
- Genre: Detective novel
- Publisher: Philomel
- Publication date: May 14, 2009
- Publication place: United States
- Media type: Print (hardcover)
- Pages: 176 pp. (first edition)
- ISBN: 978-0-399-24776-7
- OCLC: 277203432
- Preceded by: Rough Weather
- Followed by: The Professional

Chasing the Bear: A Young Spenser Novel is a 2009 novel by Robert B. Parker. Though set in present day, it is a prequel to Parker's venerable Spenser series of novels. Unlike the rest of the Spenser series, Chasing the Bear is a young adult novel and not strictly detective fiction.

== Plot ==
Spenser, while relaxing at a park with his love interest, Susan Silverman, reflects on some experiences in his life as a youth, before becoming a detective.

Spenser conveys that he grew up in an all-male household, his mother dying immediately before he was delivered by caesarean section. His household consisted of himself, his father, and his two maternal uncles. They were all uneducated, but eager to learn, worked in construction, and boxed from time to time to earn extra money. His uncles taught him to box from a very young age, three years old. They also read volumes of classic novels to him at night.

The main narrative conveys Spenser's adventures with a girl, Jeannie Haden. Jeannie was about Spenser's age, but was just a friend. Her father was an abusive drunk. One day Spenser saw her in her father's car, mouthing the words "Help" over and over again. Spenser, along with his dog, Pearl, follows the car and, eventually, Jeannie's father's boat down a river. He locates her and her father on a small island in the river, next to a lean-to. After a brief encounter with her father, Luke, Spenser is able to rescue Jeannie some time later.

They escape downriver on Spenser's rowboat, eventually leading Luke Haden to his death. Spenser's father and uncles tell him he "did good" and needn't report the death, or his role in it. But he does, but the local law enforcement doesn't charge Spenser with any crime.

Spenser relates that Jeannie had a crush on him, but he didn't return her amore. But he managed to let her down and remain friends.

As a favor to Jeannie, he goes on to protect a student of Mexican descent, Aurelio Lopez. Lopez was targeted by white classmates and beaten up on occasion. After Spenser's protection, he doesn't get bullied any longer. However, his relationship with Lopez alienates him somewhat from his white classmates, many of whom he had known since the first grade.

At the end, Spenser is confronted by the entire white gang of about fifteen boys. Before any fighting convenes, Spenser's father and uncles arrive and mediate a fair fight between just Spenser and the leader of the gang, Leo Roemer. Because of his boxing training, Spenser quickly wins the fight. He doesn't have any trouble from the gang following the showdown.

The recollection ends with Spenser going off to college in Boston on a football scholarship. After an injury his second year, he loses his scholarship and is unable to afford any further schooling and joins the police force, choosing to stay in Boston rather than returning to his home town.

== Reception ==
Chasing the Bear was received favorably by most critics, though some noted that it is probably better suited towards older young adults (mid-teens) rather than typical young adult books, which target a younger audience. Some critics found the switching between present-day and past to be distracting and felt it may alienate younger readers new to the series. Critics pointed out that there is no one mystery Spenser pursues, but rather shorter adventures which may disappoint some fans of the series.

However, at least one critic, Sarah Weinman for Los Angeles Times, said the book "ends up being an opaque window into Parker's continued creative decline" and that young readers will probably care little for the book or Spenser who is "far removed from his 1970s glory days."
