= A Man Called Hawk =

American action drama series

- Genre: Drama; Action
- Based on: lead character by Robert B. Parker
- Developed by: Stephen Hattman; William Robert Yates
- Starring: Avery Brooks; Moses Gunn
- Theme music composer: Stanley Clarke; Avery Brooks; Lawrence "Butch" Morris
- Composers: Stanley Clarke; Avery Brooks (final two episodes)
- Country of origin: United States
- Original language: English
- No. of seasons: 1
- No. of episodes: 13

Production
- Running time: 60 minutes
- Production companies: Hattman-Yates Productions; Avery Brooks Productions; Warner Bros. Television

Original release
- Network: ABC
- Release: January 28 – May 13, 1989

Related
- Spenser: For Hire

A Man Called Hawk is an American action drama series, starring Avery Brooks, that ran on ABC from January 28 to May 13, 1989. The series is a spin-off of the crime drama series Spenser: For Hire, and features the character Hawk, who first appeared in the 1976 novel Promised Land, the fourth in the series of Spenser novels by mystery writer Robert B. Parker.

== Main cast ==
On the air for just thirteen episodes, A Man Called Hawk starred Avery Brooks as the title character, who has relocated from Boston to his hometown, Washington, D.C. The series co-starred actor Moses Gunn, who portrayed a father figure to Hawk known only as "Old Man".

== Production ==
A Man Called Hawk was a spin-off of Spenser: For Hire, which aired on ABC from 1985 through 1988. Brooks co-wrote the theme music for the show with jazz legends Stanley Clarke and Butch Morris, the latter of whom also did most of the incidental music for the show.

The series was filmed in Washington, D.C.

During the first three seasons of Star Trek: Deep Space Nine, Brooks wore a full head of hair and shaved his goatee, as a means of distinguishing his character Benjamin Sisko from Hawk. The goatee was added to Sisko's look near the end of Season 3, and his head was shaved bald at the start of Season 4 (this was due in part to production of DS9 concurring with that of a series of Spenser: For Hire reunion films in which Brooks reprised Hawk).

== Episodes ==
No.	Title	Directed by	Written by	Original release date	U.S. viewers (millions)
1	"The Master's Mirror"	Virgil W. Vogel	Stephen Hattman	January 28, 1989	17.6
2	"A Time and a Place"	Winrich Kolbe	Stephen Hattman & William Robert Yates	February 4, 1989	16.3
3	"Hear No Evil"	Stanley Lathan	William Robert Yates	February 11, 1989	15.2
4	"Passing the Bar"	Bill Duke	Jerome Coopersmith	February 18, 1989	15.5
5	"The Divided Child"	Winrich Kolbe	Carleton Eastlake	February 25, 1989	15.3
6	"Vendetta"	Sigmund Neufeld	Jaison Starkes	March 4, 1989	14.6
7	"Choice of Chance"	Virgil Vogel	Steve Duncan & L. Travis Clark	March 11, 1989	12.8
8	"Poison"	Harry Falk	Story by : Joan Parker & Robert B. Parker; Teleplay by : Robert B. Parker	March 25, 1989	13.7
9	"Never My Love"	Virgil Vogel	Steve Duncan & L. Travis Clark	April 1, 1989	12.3
10	"Intensive Care"	Virgil Vogel	Carleton Eastlake	April 15, 1989	12.2
11	"If Memory Serves"	Mario Di Leo	Jaison Starkes	April 29, 1989	6.9
12	"Beautiful Are the Stars"	Virgil W. Vogel	Story by : Calvin Hernton; Teleplay by : Calvin Hernton and Steve Duncan & L. Travis Clark	May 6, 1989	10.1
13	"Life after Death"	Harry Falk	Thomas Huggins & Charlotte Clay	May 13, 1989	7.5

== Notable guest stars ==
- Angela Bassett
- Keith David
- William Fichtner
- Samuel L. Jackson
- Delroy Lindo
- Joe Morton
- Wesley Snipes
- Wendell Pierce
- Charles S. Dutton
- Michael Wincott
- Diane Salinger
- Michelle Thomas
- Kimberly Scott
- Joseph C. Phillips
- Paul Guilfoyle
- Vondie Curtis-Hall
- Anthony LaPaglia
- Frankie Faison
- Roscoe Orman
- Joe Seneca

== Syndication ==
The series was re-aired in reruns on TV One in 2006. The series was available for streaming online on Tubi, but was removed sometime in 2024.
