= Bad Business =

Bad Business may refer to:

- Bad Business, 1960 BBC TV short with Timothy Bateson
- Bad Business, 2004 film in Spenser (film series)
- A Bad Business (Недоброе дело), from Anton Chekhov bibliography 1887
- Bad Business (novel), Spenser novel by Robert B. Parker first published in 2004
- Bad Business, book by Robert Gandossy on the O.P.M. Leasing Services financial scandal
- Bad Business (comic), Star Wars Tales
- "Bad Business", song by Souls Of Mischief from Trilogy: Conflict, Climax, Resolution 2000
- "Bad Business", song by 21 Savage from Issa Album 2017
- "Bad Business", song by Grayskul from Zenith (album)
