= Spenser (film series) =

Television film series

- Joe Mantegna as Spenser and Marcia Gay Harden as Susan
- Created by: Robert B. Parker

Films and television
- Films: Spenser: Small Vices (1999); Thin Air (2000); Walking Shadow (2001)

Joe Mantegna portrayed Robert B. Parker's detective "Spenser" in three TV films on the A&E cable network between 1999 and 2001.

== Production ==
Robert B. Parker had a significant role in the development of the TV movies (all three films were adapted by Parker, with his wife co-authoring Walking Shadow) as opposed to the earlier Spenser: For Hire. Nonetheless, he felt that the movies didn't get it right, not because of the performances but because of the limited budget. Parker had a small role in the first film, and cameos in the latter two. His son, Daniel, and wife, Joan, appear in Thin Air. Spenser's ally, Hawk, was played by Sheik Mahmud-Bey in Small Vices, and returns in Walking Shadow portrayed by Ernie Hudson.

All three movies were filmed in locations in Canada.

== Films ==
=== Spenser: Small Vices ===
In this movie Spenser tries to solve the murder of a college student. It was broadcast in 1999 and is based on the 1997 novel of the same name.

- Joe Mantegna as Spenser
- Marcia Gay Harden as Susan Silverman
- Joanna Miles as Evans
- R. D. Reid as Quirk
- Scott Wickware as Captain Healy
- Sheik Mahmud-Bey as Hawk
- Robert B. Parker as Ives

=== Thin Air ===
In this movie, Spenser searches for the wife of his longtime associate, Sgt. Belson. It was broadcast in 2000 and is based on the 1995 novel of the same name.

- Joe Mantegna as Spenser
- Marcia Gay Harden as Susan Silverman
- Joanna Miles as Evans
- R. D. Reid as Quirk
- Jon Seda as Luis DeLeon
- David Ferry as Frank Belson

=== Walking Shadow ===
In this movie, Spenser tries to solve the on-stage murder of an actor. It was broadcast in 2001 and is based on the 1994 novel of the same name. It is directed by Po-Chih Leong.

- Joe Mantegna as Spenser
- Marcia Gay Harden as Susan Silverman
- Scott Wickware as Captain Healy
- Ernie Hudson as Hawk
- Eric Roberts as Police Chief DeSpain
- Christopher Lawford as Jimmy Christopholous
- Tamlyn Tomita as Rikki Wu

== Audiobooks ==
Joe Mantegna has also narrated a number of Spenser novels;

Year	Title
2012	Lullaby
2011	Sixkill
2010	Painted Ladies
2009	The Professional
2008	Rough Weather
2007	Now and Then
2006	Hundred Dollar Baby
2005	School Days
2005	Cold Service
2004	Bad Business
2004	Widow's Walk
2003	Back Story
2001	Potshot
2000	Hugger Mugger
