= Potshot (novel) =

2001 novel by Robert B. Parker

- First edition
- Author: Robert B. Parker
- Language: English
- Series: Spenser
- Genre: Detective novel
- Publisher: Putnam
- Publication date: 2001
- Publication place: United States
- Media type: Print (hardcover & paperback) and audio CD
- Pages: 352 pp
- ISBN: 0-399-14710-1
- OCLC: 49931032
- Preceded by: Hugger Mugger
- Followed by: Widow's Walk

Potshot is the 28th Spenser novel by Robert B. Parker. The story follows the fictional Boston-based PI Spenser as he tries to identify the killer of a widow's husband. As is often the case, Spenser's probing uncovers much more than just a simple—or single—murder.

== Plot ==
Spenser is approached by a beautiful blonde widow who wants him to find the identity of the murderer of her late husband. He agrees, but this case will take him away from Boston to Arizona and the resort town of Potshot. Questioning all of the victim's acquaintances yields little information. However, the couple had just recently moved from Los Angeles, so Spenser heads there to talk to their old neighbors. His visit there is very fruitful, but raises as many questions as it answers.

Returning to Potshot, Spenser follows-up on what he found out from old neighbors in LA. Meanwhile, he is investigating a band of thugs that live on the outskirts of town in an area called "The Dell". Everyone is convinced that they killed the victim, and had publicly threatened him.

"The Dell" gang is led by a man who calls himself The Preacher. He organized the gang from a ragtag group of drunks and junkies. Now, with leadership, they are bullying the townspeople and extorting protection money from local businesses. After a public confrontation with the gang, the town's leaders ask Spenser if he can rid the town of the menace.

They agree to pay a healthy sum for the service, so Spenser forms a small private band of mercenaries composed of several associates, most of them criminals or people with criminal backgrounds. But he hires them for their shooting skills, which will be needed for the coming battle.

The further Spenser digs, however, he finds that all is not what it seems in Potshot and the killing of the widow's husband may just be part of a much larger conspiracy.
