= Ceremony (Parker novel) =

1982 novel by Robert B. Parker

- First edition
- Author: Robert B. Parker
- Language: English
- Series: Spenser
- Genre: Detective fiction
- Publisher: Delacorte Press
- Publication date: 1982
- Publication place: United States
- Media type: Hardcover, paperback
- ISBN: 0-440-01151-5
- OCLC: 7923917
- Dewey Decimal: 813/.54 19
- LC Class: PS3566.A686 C4
- Preceded by: A Savage Place
- Followed by: The Widening Gyre

Ceremony is the ninth Spenser novel by Robert B. Parker, first published in March 1982. It is the first of three Spenser novels involving the character April Kyle, who returns in Taming a Sea-Horse and Hundred-Dollar Baby. Kyle is a 16-year-old girl who has run away from home and, apparently, turned to prostitution.

== Plot ==
The book opens with Spenser and Susan Silverman talking with the Kyles about their missing daughter, April. Mr. Kyle (a prosperous insurance salesman) apparently saw her in the act of seducing a John, a man about his age. He's livid at the thought of his daughter working as a prostitute and voices his opinion loudly. Spenser is clearly not interested in working for Mr. Kyle at any price, but the pleadings of Susan Silverman and Mrs. Kyle persuade Spenser to take the job (which he does for the nominal fee of one dollar).

Spenser talks to a Smithfield, Mass. cop (a friend of Susan’s named Cataldo) and gets a lead that some of April's old crowd might know something. Spenser literally strongarms a kid named Carl Hummel to find out where they think she might be: with a friend in Boston, Amy Gurwitz, who left town a few months before April did.

Spenser goes to see Amy. She is living in a three-story home with a middle-aged man named Mitchell Poitras and tries to look the part of a sophisticated well-to-do woman even though she is no more than sixteen. He gets no information from her, but is convinced she knows something about April. (It turns out that Mitchell Poitras is a high-ranking figure in the Massachusetts school system and deals with a lot of troubled youths. He is using his position to funnel troubled girls into prostitution).

Next Spenser heads to a part of Boston called the Combat Zone (Boston's red-light district). He asks a hooker about April and shows a photo he has of her. Her pimp, a strong-looking man who goes by the name "Trumps," tries to stop Spenser. Spenser takes Trumps's sap away from him and roughs him up with it. Once Trumps steps away, he learns April has been working for a pimp named "Red." The hooker warns Spenser to watch his back after roughing up Trumps because he hold grudges and that she will be beaten for what happened. Spenser offers to take her away and she laughs at him.

Spenser enlists the help of Hawk and heads back to the Combat Zone to find Red. They find him in a strip bar, but Trumps and two thugs confront Spenser before he can question Red. Hawk arrives and takes out the two thugs by slamming their heads together. Once he informs Trumps that he has Spenser's back, Trumps backs off and leaves. Red refuses to answer questions, but after Hawk chops him across the throat, Red discloses April's last known address.

Spenser and Hawk proceed to the address and find it in a filthy building with a hooker as a neighbor. April's room is dirty and small and empty except for a photo on the wall of her parents' home.

Spenser decides to watch the house that Amy and Mitchell Poitras are living in. After they leave the house, Spenser breaks into their house shortly before Thanksgiving. While there, he finds a set of spare keys and has them copied at Sears. On the third floor, he finds a kiddie porn photo and movie studio and a huge stash of pornographic photos and films. He leaves the house leaving behind no evidence of his visit.

Hawk finds out that Red works for Tony Marcus, a black crime boss. Under the pretense of hiring Trumps's hooker, the one that warned him earlier, Spenser questions her and finds out that April has been transferred to the "Sheep Ranch" (a brothel that specializes in kinky acts) in Providence, Rhode Island.

Undercover in a garish red outfit, Spenser finds the Sheep Ranch with the help of a local cabby and busts April out of there going through the madam and bouncer to do it. On the road with April, Spenser discovers that she was moved there right after he talked to Amy. He tells April he won't force her to go back to her parents if she doesn't want to. Claiming to need an emergency bathroom break on the side of the road, April gets out of the car and disappears into the woods.

Susan had befriended a neighborhood dog, a black Labrador Retriever. Someone broke into her house, shot the dog, and left it in the kitchen. Spenser gets Officer Cataldo to watch over Susan while he takes care of it.

Spenser and Hawk visit Tony Marcus's office. Soon, Spenser beats Marcus up and threatens to kill him if anything happens to Susan. He also works a deal where they can take April and bust Mitchell for child porn. Marcus begrudgingly agrees as long as his name is kept out of it. Then he punches Spenser in the jaw at the end of their meeting and Spenser lets him go. Hawk, who occasionally works freelance for Marcus, assures Spenser that Marcus's word is good.

With Susan and Hawk, Spenser visits Mitchell's house on a Friday night. After they peek into the windows, it is apparent there is a big party with numerous guests. They let themselves in the locked front door using Spenser's duplicate spare keys. They are confronted by a big bodyguard, but Hawk knocks him out and dumps him behind the shrubs by the front porch.

Upon entering the living room, they see that they have happened upon not just any old party, but a full-fledged orgy. Most of the men are middle-aged or older and all the girls are very young, most obviously younger than eighteen. After wandering through the throng of dancing and groping guests, they fail to find Amy, April, or Mitchell. A recon of the second floor finds many couples engaged in sex, but not the party hosts.

They find all three on the third floor in the kiddie porn studio. Another man, a porn distributor named Hal, is also there with his bodyguard Vance. Hawk overpowers the bodyguard and holds Amy, Mitchell, and Hal at bay with his gun. Spenser tells Susan to go with April back to the car and to call the cops (Spenser had made arrangements for the Boston Police Department's vice squad to bust a child pornographer). He instructs Amy to follow in order to avoid arrest, but she refuses. As Spenser explains to Mitchell about his impending arrest and his need to keep a certain name (Marcus) out of it, he hears Susan cry for him downstairs. He runs to help, and Hawk follows.

Once downstairs, April yelled out that Susan was trying to kidnap her and the partygoers attacked her. April had separated herself from Susan by the time Spenser and Hawk arrive. A brawl breaks out with all the partygoers against Hawk and Spenser. Due to their superior strength, reflexes, and training, they overpower all the attendees who come up against them, but just barely. They suffer a few superficial injuries but inflict much greater on their attackers.

Boston Police officers arrive just as the last partier goes down under Spenser's blows. After talking with the police and getting first aid for their wounds, Spenser and Hawk head back to Susan's red Bronco. Susan is there with April who came along willingly after the brawl. She came with the assurance that she wouldn't be forced to go back with her parents.

Spenser and Susan drop off Hawk and head back to Spenser's place. They talk with April about her options over dinner. With grave reservations, they decide to take April to interview with Patricia Utley, a madam of an upscale brothel in New York (first encountered in the Spenser book Mortal Stakes). There she can be safer, learn better escort skills, make more money, and not have to turn more than one trick a night. Susan and April spend the night; April on the couch, Susan with Spenser. They talk over their decision, not entirely happy with it, but realize it is probably the best thing for April, considering her miserable home environment and lack of better options.
