= School Days (novel) =

Book by Robert B. Parker

- The first edition of School Days.
- Author: Robert B. Parker
- Language: English
- Series: Spenser
- Genre: Detective novel
- Publisher: Putnam Adult
- Publication date: 2005
- Publication place: United States
- Media type: Print (hardcover)
- Pages: 304 pp. (first edition)
- ISBN: 0-399-15323-3
- OCLC: 59401204
- Dewey Decimal: 813/.54 22
- LC Class: PS3566.A686 S36 2005
- Preceded by: Cold Service
- Followed by: Hundred-Dollar Baby

School Days (2005) is a work of detective fiction by American author Robert B. Parker, the 33rd in his acclaimed Spenser series.

== Plot summary ==
Months after a school shooting at an elitist prep school in small-town Massachusetts leaves fifteen students and faculty dead, Spenser is hired by the grandmother of one of the alleged killers, a rich old lady who firmly believes in her grandson's innocence: she is convinced that he is not one of the two shooters who never lifted their ski masks in front of their victims and who somehow managed to disappear in the crowd without being identified. Both suspects are now in custody but unwilling to talk to anyone.

Wherever Spenser turns, people are reluctant to co-operate with him, if not outright hostile. The local police chief considers the case closed as both perpetrators are under arrest, awaiting trial and have already confessed to the crime. The head of the school is concerned with the school's reputation, bans Spenser from the school premises, and prohibits students to talk to him should he accost them anywhere in town. Even the boys' parents and their respective lawyers do not wish to throw any more light on the matter. For Spenser, however, three decisive questions have not been answered yet: where the two youngsters got the weapons from and how they were able to pay for them; where and from whom they learned to shoot; and why they planned and carried out the massacre in the first place.

The pupils Spenser meets at one of their hangouts, however, are thrilled to disobey their head teacher and collaborate with a private eye. This is how Spenser learns where the less fortunate youngsters in town who attend the local public school usually meet, that a young man of mixed ethnicity supplies them with drugs, and that he might also have sold weapons to the shooters. Spenser is soon able to answer his first two questions, but for the time being he sees no way to find a good reason why two 17-year-olds with no criminal record should go ahead and cause a bloodbath. Gradually, however, he realizes that the motive is more to do with parents and teachers than anyone is prepared to admit.

In School Days, Spenser's close friend Hawk does not appear but is mentioned. Susan Silverman is away at a conference and only returns at the end of the novel to celebrate the successful conclusion of the case. Pearl, however, having been left behind by her mistress, is constantly present.

== See also ==
- Running Wild (J. G. Ballard, 1988): Rich but emotionally neglected youngsters who feel pressurized by their parents in Thatcherite Britain seek unconventional ways to vent their anger.
- The Big Sleep (Raymond Chandler, 1939): One of Spenser's famous predecessors is hired to deal with a case in which a similar situation of blackmail occurs.
- Notes on a Scandal (Zoë Heller, 2003): An illicit teacher-student relationship destroys the lives of all involved but one.
- Rage (Stephen King (writing as Richard Bachman), 1977): A high school teenager takes his class hostage.
- We Need to Talk About Kevin (Lionel Shriver, 2003): A mother attempts to come to terms with the murders committed by her son in a school massacre.
- The novels of Edmund Crispin, about an amateur sleuth who is just as versed in literature as Spenser. For example, see The Case of the Gilded Fly (1944).
