= Spenser Confidential =

2020 American action comedy film

- Official release poster
- Directed by: Peter Berg
- Screenplay by: Sean O'Keefe; Brian Helgeland
- Based on: Robert B. Parker's Wonderland by Ace Atkins
- Produced by: Neal H. Moritz; Toby Ascher; Mark Wahlberg; Stephen Levinson; Peter Berg
- Starring: Mark Wahlberg; Winston Duke; Alan Arkin; Iliza Shlesinger; Bokeem Woodbine; Marc Maron; Austin Post
- Cinematography: Tobias A. Schliessler
- Edited by: Mike Sale
- Music by: Steve Jablonsky
- Production companies: Original Film; Closest to the Hole Productions; Leverage Entertainment; Film 44
- Distributed by: Netflix
- Release date: March 6, 2020
- Running time: 111 minutes
- Country: United States
- Language: English

Spenser Confidential is a 2020 American action comedy crime film directed by Peter Berg, with a screenplay written by Sean O'Keefe and Brian Helgeland, and based on characters created by Robert B. Parker. The film stars Mark Wahlberg, Winston Duke, Alan Arkin, Iliza Shlesinger, Bokeem Woodbine, Donald Cerrone, Marc Maron, and Austin Post in his first film appearance, and marks the fifth collaboration between Wahlberg and Berg after Lone Survivor, Deepwater Horizon, Patriots Day, and Mile 22.

The film was announced in 2018 as an adaptation of the 2013 novel Robert B. Parker's Wonderland by author Ace Atkins, itself a continuation of the actual Robert B. Parker detective series Spenser, also portrayed on TV in Spenser: For Hire. It was released on March 6, 2020, by Netflix to mixed reviews. The film marked Arkin's final live-action film appearance, and his second-overall final film appearance (before Minions: The Rise of Gru) in his lifetime; he died on June 29, 2023.

== Plot ==
Boston police Sergeant Spenser is jailed after pleading guilty to assaulting Captain John Boylan, who he suspected to be involved in the murder of Gloria Weisnewski, a family friend who protested gentrification. While incarcerated, Spenser studies to become a truck driver in Arizona and is warned to leave Boston. On release, Spenser takes up residence with his friend Henry Cimoli and his roommate, Hawk.

When Boylan is murdered, Detective Driscoll and his partner, Macklin, question Spenser. Driscoll, Spenser's former partner, accepts Spenser's alibi and urges him to leave the city. Spenser becomes suspicious when an honest cop, Detective Terrence Graham, reportedly kills himself and is identified as Boylan's killer.

Spenser questions Graham's wife, Letitia, and goes to a police bar where she said Graham met with Scotty Traylor, Terrence's partner. Traylor confirms Terrence suspected Boylan of being corrupt. Spenser acquires CCTV footage from a nearby store showing Terrence getting into a yellow Corvette, while two others got into his SUV and followed him. At the murder scene in a local school bus yard, Spenser discovers a toothpick similar to ones Driscoll uses. Driscoll advises dropping the case and denies having been to the crime scene.

Spenser chases the yellow Corvette on foot and is attacked by a dog. Hawk catches the license plate number of the car and traces it to Charles "Tracksuit Charlie" Bentwood, a mercenary hired to intimidate Gloria. Spenser, Henry, and Hawk surveil Bentwood and observe him making a hand off to Macklin. They discover an FBI team led by Agent Burton is also surveilling. Spenser extorts information from an inmate named Squeeb about Wonderland Greyhound Park, learning that it is the site of a future casino that Driscoll and drug gangs wish to invest in.

Driscoll and Macklin send gang members from the Trinitarios to kill Spenser at a restaurant, but Hawk rescues him. Henry, Hawk, and Spenser hide out at the house of Spenser's hot-tempered ex, Cissy. When Letitia's apartment is ransacked, she calls Spenser for help and gives him a recording mailed by Terrence on the day he died. It confirms Boylan is dirty and implicates Bentwood, Macklin, and Driscoll. The three had Boylan murdered for giving the information about their business to Terrence, who was then killed shortly after, and both their deaths have been staged to make it appear to be a murder-suicide. Spenser confronts Driscoll, who refuses to turn himself in. Upon handing the recording over to the FBI, Agent Burton deems it insufficient evidence. Spenser tracks down Bentwood and interrogates him, learning of a drug shipment headed to Wonderland. Spenser and Hawk hijack the drugs, but a thug escapes to warn Driscoll. Spenser's reporter contact declares the drugs to be insufficient evidence. Driscoll calls Spenser, revealing that he has kidnapped Henry. Driscoll demands a meeting at Wonderland, threatening to kill Henry if he does not bring the drugs.

Spenser, Hawk, and Cissy go to Wonderland, where Driscoll and others are gathered on the track. Cissy arrives first to move Henry out of the way, before Spenser and Hawk arrive in a truck and plow through the gang members' vehicles. Driscoll flees into the race track's clubhouse, and Spenser pursues him. After a brawl, Spenser performs a citizen's arrest after realizing how their fight resembles the day he beat up Boylan. They pile the drugs and other evidence on the infield and leave Driscoll, Bentwood, and Macklin restrained nearby. Spenser and Hawk are declared heroes, the casino project is shut down, Boylan and Bentwood are charged in Weisnewski's murder, and Driscoll is convicted and sent to prison.

Spenser, Hawk, Cissy, and Henry celebrate by going to a local diner. A TV news report shows Boston Fire Department Chief Marty Foley being arrested over charges of arson. Spenser, who has known Foley since high school, goes into deep thought as Cissy and Henry attempt to draw Spenser out of another case.

== Cast ==
- Mark Wahlberg as Spenser
- Winston Duke as Hawk
- Alan Arkin as Henry
- Iliza Shlesinger as Cissy Davis
- Michael Gaston as Captain Boylan
- Bokeem Woodbine as Driscoll
- Hope Olaidé Wilson as Letitia Graham
- Marc Maron as Wayne Cosgrove
- James DuMont as Bentwood
- Post Malone as Squeeb (credited as Austin Post)
- Colleen Camp as Betty

== Production ==
The film, originally titled Wonderland, was produced by Neal H. Moritz, Stephen Levinson, Mark Wahlberg, and Peter Berg through their respective production companies Original Film, Leverage Entertainment, Closest to the Hole Productions, and Film 44. During the autumn of 2018, Winston Duke, Post Malone, Alan Arkin, Iliza Shlesinger, Bokeem Woodbine, James DuMont, Marc Maron Michael Gaston, and Colleen Camp joined the cast of the film.

The script was written by Sean O'Keefe and Brian Helgeland, and filming began late in 2018 in Boston. The residence of character Cimoli was filmed in the Jones Hill neighborhood of Boston, on the street where actor Wahlberg lived during his teenage years, while Raynham Park, another former greyhound racing track, stood in for the Wonderland Greyhound Park, which was demolished in 2017. Funeral scenes were filmed at Central Cemetery in Randolph, Massachusetts.

== Music ==
The film score was composed by Steve Jablonsky, who has worked with director Peter Berg on previous films. The soundtrack was released by BMG.

== Release ==
The film was released by Netflix on March 6, 2020. At a meeting in April 2020 discussing first quarter business data, Netflix reported 85 million households watched the film over its first six weeks of release. In November, Variety reported the film was the 21st-most watched straight-to-streaming title of 2020 up to that point.

== Reception ==
On the review aggregator website, Rotten Tomatoes, the film holds an approval rating of 37% based on 84 reviews, with an average rating of 4.6/10. The site's critics consensus reads: "While the buddy cops at the center of Spenser Confidential are plenty affable, the comedy never arrives as this half-hearted vehicle goes purely through the motions." On Metacritic, the film has a weighted average score of 49 out of 100, based on 20 critics, indicating "mixed or average reviews".

Elisabeth Vincentelli of the New York Times criticized the film's deviation from its source material, observing that there was "almost no resemblance to the Ace Atkins novel Robert B. Parker's Wonderland ... aside from the Boston location, the main characters’ names and something or other about an abandoned dog-racing track."

Daniel Woburn of the online entertainment news website Screen Rant elaborated further on this disparity, noting many differences in characterization from the series as a whole and calling out the plot, in particular, as deviating heavily from the original novel with the biggest common thread between them being the finale at the race track.

== Sequel ==
On September 2, 2020, a sequel was confirmed to be in development with Berg, Helgeland, and Wahlberg returning.
