= Small Vices =

1997 novel by Robert B. Parker

- First edition
- Author: Robert B. Parker
- Language: English
- Series: Spenser
- Genre: Detective novel
- Publisher: Putnam
- Publication date: 1997
- Publication place: United States
- Media type: Print (Hardback & Paperback)
- Pages: 308 pp
- ISBN: 0-399-14244-4
- Preceded by: Chance
- Followed by: Sudden Mischief

Small Vices is the 24th Spenser novel by Robert B. Parker.

== Plot ==
The story follows Boston-based PI Spenser as he tries to solve the murder of a college student.

== In other media ==
Spenser: Small Vices, is a made-for-TV movie starring Joe Mantegna as Spenser.

Mantegna subsequently reprised the role in Spenser: Thin Air and Spenser: Walking Shadow.

=== Cast ===
- Joe Mantegna as Spenser
- Marcia Gay Harden as Susan
- Shiek Mahmud-Bey as Hawk
- Joanna Miles as Evans
- Robert B. Parker as Ives
