= Back Story (novel) =

2003 novel by Robert B. Parker

- First edition
- Author: Robert B. Parker
- Language: English
- Genre: Crime novel
- Publisher: G. P. Putnam's Sons
- Publication date: 2003
- Publication place: United States
- Pages: 304
- ISBN: 0-399-14977-5
- Preceded by: Widow's Walk
- Followed by: Bad Business

Back Story is a crime novel by Robert B. Parker, the 30th novel in his Spenser series. In the novel, private investigator Spenser takes on a 28-year-old cold case murder, but gets pressured by FBI agents and a mobster to drop his investigation, which only increases his curiosity.

== Plot summary ==
The novel begins with Spenser receiving a large payment for a case he worked for Rita Fiore. Due to this windfall, Spenser decides to work a case pro bono for an aspiring young actress named Daryl Gordon who is trying to find out who murdered her mother, Emily Gordon. She tells Spenser that her mother came to Boston from California to stay with her sister, and was then murdered by The Dread Scott Brigade; a revolutionary, anti-establishment movement in the 1970s, during a Boston bank robbery in 1974.

Despite the case being decades cold, and her only payment being six Krispy Kreme donuts, Spenser likes the challenge and decides to take the case. He starts by getting the case files, and speaking to the original investigators. None remember anything significant, but Spenser soon realizes that an FBI report on the case is missing. So he questions the FBI about this missing file, and they claim no such report was ever written. Soon after two FBI agents accost Spenser in his home and tell him to leave the case alone. Next, a couple of goons working for mob boss Sonny Karnofsky threaten Spenser and also tell him to stop investigating the cold case. The FBI and the mob not wanting Spenser to investigate the case only serve to pique his interest. He wonders what it is they are trying to hide and questions Sonny directly, who then orders his henchmen to kill Spenser.

Spenser decides to speak with Emily's sister, despite protests from Daryl. Emily's chain-smoking sister informs Spenser that Emily had not come to see her, but that she was actually involved with the Dread Scott Brigade. She tells them that they were both hippies, and involved in revolutionary movements during their college days in the 1970s. They would meet with prison inmates under the guise of trying to educate them, but really they were fanning their militant flames. She also tells Spenser that Emily had split from Daryl's father, and had followed a boyfriend of hers to Boston; a black revolutionary who called himself Shaka. Spenser and his friend and bodyguard Hawk then fly to California to speak with Daryl's father. Her father turns out to be a burnt-out old hippy who confirms Emily's sister's story. He also gives Spenser the names of some of Emily's friends; another black revolutionary who called himself Coyote, and a young woman named Bunny.

Back in Boston, Spenser discovers that Emily Gordon attended Taft University, and decides to visit the school. There he discovers that Emily was good friends with a woman named Bonnie Karnofsky, otherwise known as Bunny. While leaving the university he realizes he is being followed. He and Hawk split up and lead the followers into a trap and kill them in a shootout. Convinced the hitmen were Karnofsky's goons, Spenser becomes even more interested in the case, especially with the connection between Karnofsky and Emily now known. He decides to head into the small town of Paradise to stake out Karnofsky's home in hopes of following Bonnie. The local police chief there, Jesse Stone, notices Spenser and Hawk watching the Karnofsky place and questions them about it. After checking them out with Healy, Jesse brings them coffee and they tell him about the investigation. Stone tells them that Bonnie doesn't live there, but will have his people look into her. Later, Stone's people inform Spenser that Bonnie often visits to sunbathe on her father's property.

Later Spenser meets with Daryl to tell her what he has discovered. She gets upset and tells him to stop investigating. After speaking with Susan, Spenser realizes that Daryl thought she had an ideal childhood that was interrupted only by her mother's murder. She hated growing up with her father, and only wanted Spenser to confirm her mother's saintliness and that she would have had the perfect upbringing had she not been killed. She wanted to have a picture perfect story for her memoir as she became more famous as an actress. Despite her taking him off the case, Spenser decides to continue the investigation.

He then discovers that the Karnofsky's have been paying Daryl's father $2,000 a month for the last 28 years. He and Hawk fly out to California again, and this time Daryl's father tells him that Daryl is actually Bonnie and Abner Fancy's (a.k.a. Shaka) child. Bonnie had the child with Shaka, but she did not want her so she gave her to Emily who raised her for six years. After Emily was murdered they sent Daryl back to the man she knew as her father and paid him to raise her and keep his mouth shut about her true parentage. Sonny Karnofsky did this because he was humiliated that his daughter had a child with a black man. Sonny also later discovers that the man who called himself Coyote was an FBI informant, which is why the FBI buried the case. They did not want people to know that their informant was in The Dread Scott Brigade and that he participated in a bank robbery.

Spenser goes back to Boston with this information. Once again he is trailed by gunmen, and after leading them to a stadium where Susan and he often work out, kills them in another shootout. He decides he must finish the case so he can protect himself and Susan. He then visits Jesse Stone, and after telling him the latest information, tells him he plans to kidnap Bonnie Karnofsky from her father's house the next time she visits. Stone agrees to not get involved, and even takes Spenser out on a boat to show him the spot where Bonnie sunbathes. Later, Spenser and Hawk stake out the place and discover that she always swims out to a raft to cool down after lying in the sun a while. They wait for her to swim out again and when she does they pull up in a speed boat and kidnap her.

They take her back to Susan's place and there Bonnie confesses to being Daryl's mother and killing Emily. She killed Emily during the robbery because she was jealous of her. She had given up her child to be with Shaka. And then Shaka left her for the woman she had given the child to. Later Shaka killed their bank robbery accomplice, Rob, as he was the only one that knew Bonnie killed Emily. Sonny Karnofsky then killed Shaka because he didn't want his daughter with a black man. He then arranged for her to marry one of his old bodyguards, a man named Ziggy. Spenser calls Sonny and has him meet him at Susan's house. He tells Sonny what he knows, but agrees to not take the information to the police if Sonny will agree to back off of him and Susan. Sonny agrees, and he and Bonnie leave.
