= Valediction (disambiguation) =

A valediction is a farewell, especially the wording used to close a letter or a speech by a valedictorian.

Valediction may also refer to:

- Valediction (novel), 1984 novel by Robert B.Parker
- Locked In (film), a 2010 film with the production title Valediction
- Operation Valediction, a World War II military operation
- "Valediction" (Agent Carter), an episode of the American television series Agent Carter

== See also ==
- Valedictorian
