= Pastime (novel) =

1991 novel by Robert B. Parker

- First edition
- Author: Robert B. Parker
- Language: English
- Series: Spenser
- Genre: Detective novel
- Publisher: Putnam Adult
- Publication date: 1991
- Publication place: United States
- Media type: Print (hardback & paperback)
- Pages: 223 pp
- ISBN: 0-399-13628-2
- Preceded by: Stardust
- Followed by: Double Deuce

Pastime is the 18th Spenser novel by Robert B. Parker. The story follows Boston-based PI Spenser as he attempts to find a man's missing mother.

== Plot ==
Spenser's semi-adopted son, Paul Giacomin, visits Spenser in Boston asking for his help. He can't locate his mother, who has apparently left on an extended trip without telling him. While Paul's mother is somewhat lacking in motherly skills, he doesn't believe she would voluntarily leave her home for such an extended period without contacting him. Though Paul can't pay Spenser, he takes the case anyway as a favor to Paul.

Spenser takes Paul along in his sleuthing, introducing him as his "prentice", though Paul has no real intention of becoming a detective: he just wants to find his mother.

== Recurring characters ==
- Spenser
- Paul Giacomin
- Hawk
- Dr. Susan Silverman, Ph.D
- Cpt. Martin Quirk, Boston Police Department
- Vinnie Morris
- Joe Broz
- Gerrie Broz
- Patty Giacomin
