= Hush Money =

Hush Money may refer to:

- Hush money (slang) in exchange for remaining silent
- Hush Money (1921 film), a 1921 silent film directed by Charles Maigne
- Hush Money (1931 film), a 1931 comedy film directed by Sidney Lanfield
- Hush Money (2017 film), a 2017 crime thriller film directed by Terrell Lamont
- Hush Money (novel), a 1999 mystery novel by Robert B. Parker
- Hush Money (band), an American rock band starring former Hellyeah/Damageplan bassist Bob Kakaha
