= The Godwulf Manuscript =

1973 crime novel by Robert B. Parker

- First edition
- Author: Robert B. Parker
- Cover artist: Paul Bacon
- Language: English
- Series: Spenser
- Genre: Detective novel
- Publisher: Houghton Mifflin
- Publication date: 1973
- Publication place: United States
- Media type: Print (hardback & paperback)
- Pages: 186 pp
- ISBN: 0-395-18011-2
- Followed by: God Save the Child

The Godwulf Manuscript is the debut crime novel by American writer Robert B. Parker. It was published in January 1973 by Houghton Mifflin.

== Plot summary ==
Set in the early 1970s, this novel serves as the introduction to Spenser, a private investigator in Boston. Spenser, who served as an infantryman in the 1st Infantry Division during the Korean War and as a former State trooper, is hired by Bradford W. Forbes, the president of an unnamed university (heavily implied to be Northeastern, the university at which Parker himself taught at the time) to recover a stolen illuminated manuscript, a medieval book of great historical and literary importance. It's being held for ransom by an unknown perpetrator who demands $100,000 be donated to a free school for the manuscript's return. It has no inherent monetary value since it cannot be fenced, and the university — a poor, inner-city school (much as Northeastern was at the time) — cannot afford the ransom.

Head of campus security Carl Tower recommends investigating a radical student group called 'SCACE' (Student Committee Against Capitalist Exploitation) and their secretary, Terry Orchard. After talking to Terry and her boyfriend Dennis Powell, Spenser gets into a minor altercation with Powell. Later that night, Spenser receives a call from Terry requesting help. Spenser arrives at her apartment to find Dennis murdered, the killer having used Terry's gun, and Terry had been overdosed on an unknown drug. He determines that the murder is an attempt to frame Terry and from that point on he is determined to clear her name, believing the missing manuscript and Dennis's murder are related.

Spenser's investigation leads him to Lowell Hayden, an English professor at the university who is reputedly an anonymous member of SCACE. Spenser asks permission of the English Department head to interview the members of the faculty, but is rebuffed. Ignoring the department head's warning, Spenser sneaks up to Hayden's office and interviews him anyway. Hayden denies knowing either Dennis Powell or Terry Orchard, although Spenser believes Hayden does in fact know them. Spenser leaves the English Department offices and is met by campus security: he has been summarily 'fired' from his job of looking for the manuscript.

Spenser is escorted by two of Broz's men, Phil (a top hand) and a low-level thug, to meet Joe Broz, a local crime lord, shortly after talking to Hayden. Broz warns Spenser to stop his investigation and hints that the manuscript will be returned if he does. The very next day the manuscript is anonymously returned to the university, just as Broz said it would be. Spenser gets no credit for its return.

Undeterred by this series of events, Spenser continues his investigation to prove Terry's innocence in the murder of Powell and tie it to the theft of the manuscript. Captain Yates has taken over the police investigation and is determined to railroad Terry Orchard into prison for Powell's death.

Spenser tries to contact Cathy Connelly, Terry Orchard's former roommate and the only other person who knew Terry owned a gun. Connelly doesn't answer her door so Spenser breaks in. He finds Connelly's body floating in the bathtub and a wound on the back of her head. Spenser's opinion is that she was murdered and the scene was staged to look like an accident. Boston Police Captain Yates believes the death was accidental but his subordinates, Lieutenant Martin Quirk and Sergeant Frank Belson, believe otherwise. They also no longer believe Terry Orchard murdered Dennis Powell. Spenser begins working unofficially with Quirk and Belson to find the truth behind the two murders. (This is the first of many such collaborations that continue throughout the Spenser series. It is a mutually beneficial relationship: the police are able to use Spenser to gather information that they could not obtain through strictly legal channels and Spenser is able to use police resources to which he would not normally have access.)

Spenser decides to trail Professor Hayden and maybe learn something. He sees two thugs get into Hayden's car at the university and Spenser follows them to Jamaica Pond. By then, it was dark. The two gunmen intended to kill Hayden, but Spenser killed one and took a bullet in his side from the other. After crawling away, he managed to kill the other gunman, but instead of helping Spenser, Hayden ran away.

Spenser was hauled away by an ambulance and as soon as he was able to walk, he left the hospital and went to see Mrs. Hayden. He convinced her to lead him to her husband's hiding place: a hotel downtown. In fact, Spenser had unknowingly led Broz's man Phil to Hayden. Phil intended to kill them all, but Hayden's wife launched herself onto Phil and bit down on his gun hand so that he was unable to shoot anyone but her. While Phil dealt with Mrs. Hayden, Spenser was on his back choking him to death. In the end, Phil and Mrs. Hayden were both dead and Spenser's wound was torn open again.

Spenser threatens Hayden in order to make him tell the truth to Quirk. This ties Joe Broz to Lowell Hayden, leading to Hayden's arrest for Connelly's murder and possibly Broz's arrest. Dennis Powell was in fact dealing heroin on the university campus, heroin supplied by Broz to Hayden, and Hayden to Powell. Hayden believed the heroin would allow people to expand their minds leading to an "open society;" Powell dealt it for the sake of the money to be made from it. Believing Powell had betrayed SCACE, Hayden had Broz put a hit on Powell, orchestrated the framing of Terry Orchard for the crime, and murdered Cathy Connelly himself to cover it up. The manuscript was stolen by Powell at Hayden's request to help fund SCACE's cause. Broz had Hayden return it in the hopes that Spenser would drop the case before discovering the heroin distribution scheme.

(This story also introduces Brenda Loring, a character that is referenced in many of the succeeding Spenser books.)

== Release details ==
- 1973, USA, Houghton Mifflin Company, Boston, ISBN 0-395-18011-2
