= Crimson Joy =

1988 novel by Robert B. Parker

- First edition
- Author: Robert B. Parker
- Language: English
- Series: Spenser
- Genre: Detective fiction
- Publisher: Delacorte Press
- Publication date: 1988
- Publication place: United States
- Pages: 211
- ISBN: 0-385-29651-7
- Preceded by: Pale Kings and Princes
- Followed by: Playmates

Crimson Joy is the 15th Spenser novel by Robert B. Parker.

The story follows Boston based PI Spenser as he tracks a serial killer the press has dubbed the "Red Rose Killer".

The killer turns out to be a therapeutic patient of Spenser's girlfriend Susan Silverman, challenging their safety and testing their relationship.

== Recurring characters ==
- Spenser
- Hawk
- Dr. Susan Silverman, Ph.D
- Lt. Martin Quirk, Boston Police Department
- Sgt. Frank Belson, Boston Police Department
- Tony Marcus
- Henry Cimoli
- Wayne Cosgrove

Mentioned but not seen:

- Rita Fiore
- Paul Giacomin
- Linda Thomas
