= Pale King =

Pale King may mean:

- Pale king, a name of the Witch-king of Angmar, Lord of the Nazgûl in J. R. R. Tolkien's 1954-1955 The Lord of the Rings
- The Pale King, an unfinished novel by David Foster Wallace, published posthumously in 2011
- "The Pale King", a 2016 song on the album Brotherhood of the Snake by Testament

== See also ==
- Pale Kings and Princes, a 1987 novel by Robert B. Parker, its title taken from Keats's poem La Belle Dame sans Merci
- The Pale King, a character in the video game Hollow Knight
