= Paper doll (disambiguation) =

Paper doll is a figure cut out of paper.

Paper doll or paper dolls may also refer to:

== Music ==
- "Paper Doll" (Mills Brothers song), 1943
- "Paper Doll" (P.M. Dawn song), 1991
- "Paper Doll" (Fleetwood Mac song), 1992
- "Paper Dolls", a 2000 song by Kylie Minogue released as a B-side to her single "Spinning Around"
- "Paper Doll", a 2013 song by John Mayer from Paradise Valley
- Paperdoll (EP), an EP by the heavy metal band Kittie

== Bands ==
- Paper Dolls (group), a British female vocal trio of the late 1960s
- Paperdoll (band), an indie-pop band from New York City
- Paper Doll (novel), a novel by Robert B. Parker
- The Paper Dolls, a 1964 novel by L. P. Davies
- The Paper Dolls, a children's book by Julia Donaldson

== Movies and TV ==
- Paper Dolls (film), a 2006 Israeli documentary film
- Paper Doll (film), a 2003 American film
- Paper Dolls, a 1982 TV movie and 1984 soap opera on ABC
- Paper Dolls (Australian TV series), a 2023 Australian TV series

== Gaming ==
- Paper doll (video games), a common way of displaying a character's inventory

== Comics ==
- Paper Doll (comics), a Marvel Comics character
