= Double Deuce =

1992 novel by Robert B. Parker

- First edition
- Author: Robert B. Parker
- Language: English
- Series: Spenser
- Genre: Detective fiction
- Publisher: Putnam Adult
- Publication date: 1992
- Publication place: United States
- Media type: Print (hardback & paperback)
- Pages: 224
- ISBN: 0-399-13721-1
- OCLC: 27807611
- Preceded by: Pastime
- Followed by: Paper Doll

Double Deuce is a 1992 novel by American writer Robert B. Parker, the 19th book featuring the private investigator Spenser. The story follows Boston-based Spenser as he and his friend Hawk butt heads against a street gang while attempting to solve the murder of a teenage mother and her young daughter.
