= Spenser (character) =

American literary detective

- First appearance: The Godwulf Manuscript (1973)
- Last appearance: As written by Parker, Sixkill (2010); character is currently being written by Ace Atkins and Mike Lupica
- Created by: Robert B. Parker
- Portrayed by: Robert Urich; Joe Mantegna; Mark Wahlberg

In-universe information
- Gender: Male
- Occupation: Private detective
- Significant other: Susan Silverman
- Children: Paul Giacomin (adopted son, first appears in Early Autumn)
- Relatives: Sam Spenser (father), Cash (maternal uncle), Patrick (maternal uncle) revealed in Chasing the Bear
- Nationality: American

Spenser is a fictional private investigator created by the American mystery writer Robert B. Parker. He acts as the protagonist of a series of detective novels written by Parker and later continued by Ace Atkins and Mike Lupica. His first appearance was in the 1973 novel The Godwulf Manuscript. He is also featured in the 1980s television series Spenser: For Hire and a related series of TV movies based on the novels. In March 2020, he was featured in the Netflix thriller film Spenser Confidential.

Spenser is only referred to by his surname in the novels and the television series. Spenser is addressed as "Jim" at the end of Chapter 9 of "The Godwulf Manuscript" though this was probably a casual address by a stranger, akin to "Mac" or "Buddy."

== Fictional biography ==
Spenser was born and grew up in Laramie, Wyoming and is a Boston private eye in the mold of Raymond Chandler's Philip Marlowe, a smart-mouthed tough guy with a heart of gold. Unlike Marlowe, Spenser maintains a committed relationship with one woman (Susan Silverman, a psychologist). He is an ex-boxer who likes to remind readers that he once fought the former heavyweight champ Jersey Joe Walcott, and he lifts weights to stay in shape. He is quite well educated, cooks, and lives by a code of honor he and Susan discuss occasionally—though as infrequently as he can manage.

Like his creator, Robert B. Parker, Spenser is a Bostonian, and spent time in Korea with the U.S. Army. Spenser served as an infantryman in the 1st Infantry Division during the Korean War.

Spenser is a former State trooper investigator assigned to the Suffolk County District Attorney's (DA) Office (although some novels state that he also worked out of the Middlesex County DA's Office; Walking Shadow and the pilot episode of Spenser: For Hire say he was a Boston Police detective), and regularly seeks help from (or sometimes butts heads with) Martin Quirk. Quirk is originally a police lieutenant, later a captain, and he rises to an assistant superintendent (according to Little White Lies) of the Boston Police Department. Among his other police contacts are Sergeant Frank Belson and Detective Lee Farrell, both homicide investigators under Quirk's command; Healy, a captain of the Massachusetts State Police; and Mark Samuelson, an LAPD lieutenant (later promoted to captain, as mentioned in Back Story). In Massachusetts, each county District Attorney's office has a squad of State Police Detectives assigned to their office to conduct investigations of major crimes committed in their jurisdictions.

Scotch is Spenser's drink of celebration. This is mostly having to do with an encounter with a bear while bird hunting in his teens. Spenser seems to agree with William Faulkner's assessment of Scotch — "that brown liquor which not women, not boys and children, but only hunters drank." He also frequently drinks Irish Whiskey, sometimes just as a nod to his ethnic heritage, saying “The thing I like about Irish whiskey is that the more you drink the smoother it goes down. Of course that's probably true of antifreeze as well, but illusion is nearly all we have.”

One of the inconsistencies or possible cases of retroactive continuity within the Spenser series surrounds his mother. In some of the early books he refers to his mother and, in 1981's A Savage Place, for example, he quotes advice his mother gave him. By A Catskill Eagle, Spenser states that his mother died during labor and he was delivered via Caesarean section, i.e. "not of woman born" as Parker has Spenser put it; he was raised by his father and his two maternal uncles, all of them carpenters, who do not appear in the series. Spenser received a football scholarship to Holy Cross, where he played strong safety. Spenser injured his knee and dropped out because he did not have the funds to complete his schooling. He took up boxing, and met Hawk, a tough man skilled with firearms, and Henry Cimoli, the owner of a gym where Spenser and Hawk still work out. His family unit beyond his near-fraternal relationship with Hawk is essentially Susan Silverman, an unofficial foster son named Paul Giacomin, and a series of dogs all named Pearl after Spenser's childhood dog of the same breed, a German Shorthaired Pointer. Silverman, originally a high school guidance counselor, continues to assist Spenser in his cases after becoming a Harvard-trained Ph.D. psychologist. Giacomin, initially an awkward, unsocialized teenager, becomes a professional actor and dancer.

=== Hawk ===
The other major character in the Spenser novels is his close friend Hawk, originally introduced in the fourth novel Promised Land. A black man, Hawk is an equally tough but somewhat shady echo of Spenser himself. Hawk served in the French Foreign Legion and in combat operations overseas. Hawk is a "Gun for Hire" who lives by his own personal code. Spenser and Hawk met as boxing opponents during a preliminary bout in the Boston Arena (now known as Matthews Arena). Each man believes he was the victor. Spenser and Hawk respect each other and are friends who each understand the other's philosophy of how to conduct themselves in life. Hawk received his own television series, A Man Called Hawk, in 1989.

=== Young Spenser ===
Released in 2009, a young adult novel, Chasing the Bear, discusses some of Spenser's childhood, and further complicates the continuity issue with his family. At the end of the novel, Spenser leaves his father and uncles behind in Wyoming to attend college in Boston. No information was released as to whether this would commence a fourth regular series for Parker before his death in January 2010.

=== Spenser's firearms ===
In the 1970s and 1980s, Spenser usually carried a Smith & Wesson Model 36 in .38 Special caliber, "Chief's Special" revolver. He would sometimes carry a .357 Magnum revolver that he usually kept in the top drawer of his office desk, for "just in case" situations. Spenser also had a small .32 caliber revolver that he carried as a "backup" weapon in the 1970s and early 1980s. In the novel The Widening Gyre, Spenser carried a .25 caliber semiautomatic as a backup, and had it in his hand when confronted by two assassins - killing both. In 1992, Spenser started regularly carrying a Browning Hi-Power 9mm semi-automatic pistol. In 2010, Spenser replaces the Browning with a Smith & Wesson .40 caliber semi-automatic pistol. In 2012, he starts carrying the Chief's Special again while working, but also carries the .357 Magnum or the .40 caliber Smith & Wesson, in addition to the .38 Special, when anticipating a possible gunfight. On rare occasions, Spenser would use a rifle or shotgun when the situation required them. Spenser of the TV show carried a Beretta 92 9mm semi-automatic pistol. He also used a revolver, mostly in the first season.

== Novels ==
By Robert B. Parker:

1. The Godwulf Manuscript (1973)
2. God Save the Child (1974)
3. Mortal Stakes (1975)
4. Promised Land (1976) (Edgar Award, 1977, Best Novel; adapted into pilot episode of Spenser: For Hire)
5. The Judas Goat (1978; adapted into Lifetime TV movie)
6. Looking for Rachel Wallace (1980)
7. Early Autumn (1981)
8. A Savage Place (1981; adapted into Lifetime TV movie)
9. Ceremony (1982; adapted into Lifetime TV movie)
10. The Widening Gyre (1983)
11. Valediction (1984)
12. A Catskill Eagle (1985)
13. Taming a Sea-Horse (1986)
14. Pale Kings and Princes (1987; adapted into Lifetime TV movie)
15. Crimson Joy (1988)
16. Playmates (1989)
17. Stardust (1990)
18. Pastime (1991)
19. Double Deuce (1992)
20. Paper Doll (1993)
21. Walking Shadow (1994; adapted into A&E TV movie)
22. Thin Air (1995; adapted into A&E TV movie)
23. Chance (1996)
24. Small Vices (1997; adapted into A&E TV movie)
25. Sudden Mischief (1998)
26. Hush Money (1999)
27. Hugger Mugger (2000)
28. Potshot (2001)
29. Widow's Walk (2002)
30. Back Story (2003)
31. Bad Business (2004)
32. Cold Service (2005)
33. School Days (2005)
34. Hundred-Dollar Baby (2006)
35. Now and Then (2007)
36. Rough Weather (2008)
37. Chasing the Bear: A Young Spenser Novel (2009)
38. The Professional (2009)
39. Painted Ladies (2010)
40. Sixkill (2011)
41. Silent Night (2013) (with Helen Brann, Parker's longtime literary agent)

By Ace Atkins:

1. Lullaby (2012)
2. Wonderland (2013)
3. Cheap Shot (2014)
4. Kickback (2015)
5. Slow Burn (2016)
6. Little White Lies (2017)
7. Old Black Magic (2018)
8. Angel Eyes (2019)
9. Someone To Watch Over Me (2021)
10. Bye Bye Baby (2022)

By Mike Lupica:

1. Broken Trust (2023)
2. Hot Property (2024)
3. Showdown (2025)

== Adaptations ==
The universe depicted in the TV episodes and movies diverges from that in the novels, though many of the filmed presentations are based on, and named after, novels in the series.

=== Spenser TV series ===
The Spenser books were the inspiration for the 1985-1988 ABC TV series Spenser: For Hire starring Robert Urich as Spenser, Barbara Stock as Susan, and Avery Brooks as Hawk. All three seasons of the series have been released on DVD by the Warner Archive Collection.

Avery Brooks starred in a spin-off series entitled A Man Called Hawk.

=== First Spenser film series ===
Four made-for-TV movies based upon the series were produced by the Lifetime cable network between 1993 and 1995, again starring Robert Urich and Avery Brooks. The movies were based on four of Parker's novels: Ceremony, Pale Kings and Princes, The Judas Goat and A Savage Place. Parker and his wife Joan co-wrote the first two screenplays. Barbara Stock was replaced as Susan Silverman in the first two movies by Barbara Williams and in the last two by veteran actress Wendy Crewson (Air Force One). Frank Belson was played by J. Winston Carroll. Parker's son Daniel appears in all four movies as a waiter in Spenser's favorite restaurant. Unlike the series, which was filmed in Boston, the new movies were filmed in Toronto (to take advantage of lower production costs). The first two movies retained the novels' Boston setting (parts of Toronto passed for Boston), while the second two were re-written to take place in Toronto.

=== Second Spenser film series ===
Beginning in 1999, Joe Mantegna played Spenser in three TV movies on the A&E cable network: Small Vices (1999), Thin Air (2000), Walking Shadow (2001). Marcia Gay Harden played Susan, while Shiek Mahmud-Bey and, later, Ernie Hudson played Hawk. Robert B. Parker had a significant role in the development of the TV movies (all three films were adapted by Parker, with his wife co-authoring Walking Shadow).

=== Spenser Netflix movie ===
Spenser Confidential (formerly called "Wonderland") is a mystery film directed by Peter Berg and written by Sean O'Keefe. The film is very loosely based on the 2013 novel by Ace Atkins, an authorized continuation of the Spenser series. It uses the names of characters from the series of novels and a Boston setting, but otherwise departs substantially from the Parker/Atkins novels. The film stars Mark Wahlberg as Spenser, Winston Duke as Hawk and Alan Arkin as Henry Cimoli. Post Malone, Iliza Shlesinger, Bokeem Woodbine and Donald Cerrone also appear. Spenser Confidential was released by Netflix in March 2020. The movie received generally negative reviews, with Atkins taking negative swipes at both Wahlberg and the movie itself in the pages of the two Spenser novels released after the movie.

== Shared universe ==
Spenser and Hawk live in the same Boston literary universe as Parker's other, later series characters: private investigator Sunny Randall and small town police chief Jesse Stone, the former of whom was possibly mentioned in passing as a blonde jogging with an English bull terrier, while the latter had a much larger role in Back Story. Susan Silverman is Sunny Randall's psychologist in Melancholy Baby.

The fictional Taft University, where Susan teaches, was also a primary setting for the Spenser novel Playmates and the non-Spenser novel Love and Glory.
