= A Savage Place =

1981 novel by Robert B. Parker

- First edition
- Author: Robert B. Parker
- Language: English
- Series: Spenser
- Genre: Detective fiction
- Publisher: Delacorte Press
- Publication date: 1981
- Publication place: United States
- Pages: 186
- ISBN: 0-385-28951-0
- Preceded by: Early Autumn (Robert B. Parker novel)
- Followed by: Ceremony (Robert B. Parker novel)

A Savage Place is a detective fiction novel by American writer Robert B. Parker, the 8th book in the Spenser series. It was published in 1981 by Delacorte Press.

The title is from the Samuel Taylor Coleridge's poem "Kubla Khan". The book's epigraph is an excerpt from the poem, from "And there were gardens" to "A savage place! as holy and enchanted / As e'er beneath a waning moon was haunted / By woman wailing for her demon lover!"

== Plot ==
The story follows Spenser, a private investigator in Boston. Spenser, who served as an infantryman in the 1st Infantry Division during the Korean War and as a former State trooper, who acts as a bodyguard for television reporter Candy Sloan in Los Angeles as she investigates a corrupt movie studio. They travel to various locations around the city and Spenser makes repeated reference to forgotten Hollywood figures such as Dale Evans, Mala Powers, Tom Conway, Nina Foch, and Rudd Weatherwax to Sloan's incomprehension. They sleep together once, but not later, because Spenser felt the first time was not a betrayal of his love Susan Silverman but the later times would be. Near the end of the novel, Sloan is shot and killed, a death that haunts Spenser in later novels. Spenser holds her killers hostage and forces an on-camera confession from the businessman involved. The Los Angeles police detective Spenser meets during Sloan's investigation and death, Mark Samuelson, is sympathetic to Spenser's actions and helps him leave for Boston without arrest. Samuelson becomes a recurring character in later novels.

== Recurring characters ==
- Spenser
- Mark Samuelson
- Susan Silverman
