= Now and Then (novel) =

2007 novel by Robert B. Parker

- First edition (publ. G.P. Putnam's Sons)
- Author: Robert B. Parker
- Language: English
- Publication date: 2007

Now and Then is the 35th novel in Robert B. Parker's Spenser series and first published in 2007.
