= Love and Glory =

Novel by Robert B. Parker

- First edition (publ. Delacorte Press)
- Author: Robert B. Parker
- Language: English
- Publication date: 1983

Love and Glory (ISBN 0-385-29261-9) is a 1983 novel by Robert B. Parker. The story is told in the first person by Boone Adams. It is a coming-of-age and love story. There is explicit and implicit reference to and imitation of The Great Gatsby. Parker originally intended a combination novel and time capsule. The time capsule sections, inter-chapter devices with baseball box scores, old ad copy, captions from Life magazine and popular song lyrics, were ultimately scrapped due to excessive permission fees.

Much of the novel takes place at the fictional Taft University, which Parker used later as the setting for the 1989 Spenser novel Playmates and where Susan Silverman teaches.

== Plot ==
The protagonist tells of his days at an eastern college in the United States, where he falls in love with a girl but is unable to win her. He leaves school to become a writer, but drink and his frank comments lose him his day jobs before he can become a real writer. He spirals down, moving west, while drinking and taking ever-lower jobs. Along the way, he gets sent to Korea during the Korean War. Finally, he hits bottom, but with a mis-interpreted line from The Great Gatsby, his enduring love for his unrequited love, and the good luck of getting a job from someone, he is able to turn himself around. All the time, the one thing he has been able to hold on to is his collection of unsent letters to his love. After he has regained health and direction, he returns to the east to be near his love and to work his way to being a writer. He re-enters school and winds up getting his doctorate in English at the same time she does. Through his years of finishing his bachelor's, and getting his graduate degrees, he gets closer to her, eventually becoming more than a friend, and convincing her that she should divorce her successful husband, who is the head of the English Department, to marry the protagonist.
