= Bad Business (novel) =

2004 novel by Robert B. Parker

- First edition
- Author: Robert B. Parker
- Language: English
- Series: Spenser
- Genre: Detective novel
- Publisher: Putnam Adult
- Publication date: 2004
- Publication place: United States
- Media type: Print (hardback)
- Pages: 320 pp.
- ISBN: 0-399-15145-1
- OCLC: 53306382
- Dewey Decimal: 813/.54 22
- LC Class: PS3566.A686 B34 2004
- Preceded by: Back Story
- Followed by: Cold Service

Bad Business is a detective novel by Robert B. Parker first published in 2004. It features Parker's most famous creation, Boston-based private investigator Spenser, and is the 31st novel in the series. In this novel, Spenser is hired by a wealthy woman to gather evidence on her husband's infidelity. Soon, due to Spenser's investigation, homicides start occurring.

== Plot summary ==
Spenser is hired by a wealthy woman, Marlene Rowley, to gather evidence on her husband's infidelity. While following the husband, Trent, one evening and finding him meeting his mistress, Spenser discovers that she too is being followed by another private detective. Things get even stranger when Spenser discovers that Marlene Rowley is also being followed by a third P.I.

Eventually, Trent winds up dead as Spenser is waiting to follow him outside his place of business, Kinergy, where he is CFO. The investigation picks up steam as Spenser tries to solve the murder. More people end up dead and the other two P.I.s Spenser ran into disappear. The story involves corporate corruption and an accounting scandal that only a detective as determined as Spenser can unravel.

Several Spenser-verse reappearing characters are featured in this book including Hawk, Vinnie Morris, Susan Silverman and Pearl, their dog.
