= Taming a Sea-Horse =

1986 novel by Robert B. Parker

- First edition
- Author: Robert B. Parker
- Language: English
- Series: Spenser
- Genre: Detective fiction
- Publisher: Delacorte Press
- Publication date: 1986
- Publication place: United States
- Pages: 320
- ISBN: 0-385-29461-1
- Preceded by: A Catskill Eagle
- Followed by: Pale Kings and Princes

Taming a Sea-Horse is the 13th Spenser novel by Robert B. Parker.

The title is from the Robert Browning poem "My Last Duchess". The book's epigraph is of the poem's closing lines:

Nay, we'll go
Together down, sir:
Notice Neptune, though,
Taming a sea-horse thought a rarity, Which Claus of Innsbruck cast in bronze for me!

The story follows Boston based PI Spenser as he searches for April Kyle, the prostitute he met in events described in the earlier novel Ceremony. Kyle's story continues in Hundred-Dollar Baby.
