= Early Autumn (Parker novel) =

1981 novel by Robert B. Parker

- Author: Robert B. Parker
- Language: English
- Series: Spenser
- Genre: Detective novel
- Publisher: Delacorte Press
- Publication date: 1981
- Publication place: United States
- Media type: Print (Hardback & Paperback)
- Pages: 224 pp
- ISBN: 978-0440122142
- OCLC: 9317082
- Preceded by: Looking for Rachel Wallace
- Followed by: A Savage Place

Early Autumn is a 1981 detective novel by Robert B. Parker, published by Delacorte Press, and the seventh in the Spenser series. It follows the titular Spenser protecting a boy, Paul, from kidnapping. It received mixed critical reception, with praise towards Spenser as a character and his growth with Paul, but some criticism of the commercial nature and thin plot of the series.

== Synopsis ==
Spenser is hired to protect a boy, Paul Giacomin, from being kidnapped in a custody quarrel. He ends up taking care of the boy, who is socially immature, having been ignored by his parents, only used as a pawn in their quarrelling. Spenser takes him in and helps him mature through learning to box, exercising, weight-lifting and building a cottage. At the same time, with the help of Hawk, he collects enough information about the parents that they leave the boy alone and let Spenser unofficially adopt him.

== Publication history ==
Early Autumn was published in February 1981 by Delacorte Press. It was the seventh novel in the Spenser series.

== Reception ==
Early Autumn received mixed reviews. Kirkus Reviews called the book "disappointing for mystery lovers", but "nice enough [...] for those tolerant of Parker's particular brand of tough-guy treacle". The Boston Globe's book editor Margaret Manning was more positive, praising the dialogue and presentation over the plot. Reception to Spenser's raising of the young Paul as a father figure was positive. Spenser himself remained a popular character, and the series general main appeal, although Charles Chaplin of the Los Angeles Times considered the humor irritating and the Spenser series more of a commercial necessity for Parker than a true act of passion.
