= Blue Screen (novel) =

2006 novel by Robert B. Parker

- First edition
- Author: Robert B. Parker
- Language: English
- Series: Sunny Randall
- Genre: Crime novel
- Publisher: Berkley Books
- Publication date: 2006
- Publication place: United States
- Pages: 320
- ISBN: 0-425-21598-9
- Preceded by: Melancholy Baby
- Followed by: Spare Change

Blue Screen is a crime novel by Robert B. Parker, the fifth in his Sunny Randall series.

== Plot summary ==
Sunny Randall is approached by Buddy Bollen to provide protection for his number one client, Erin Flint, star of the Woman Warrior movie series and future star of Bollen's major league baseball team.. Bollen's fears prove well founded when Erin's assistant, Misty, is murdered. Because of Misty's striking resemblance to her, Erin is convinced the killer was after her. Sunny meets Paradise Police Chief Jesse Stone at the scene of the crime; however Buddy and Erin lack confidence in the Paradise police, and ask Sunny to solve the crime.

Sunny talks to a sports writer who is convinced that Erin Flint's addition to Bollen's baseball team is a publicity stunt and that Erin will not be able to compete with the male players in the major league. He proves to be right later when Erin faces a major league pitcher and cannot hit one ball.

Sunny discovers that Erin Flint is actually Ethel Boverini, and that she is still married to pimp Gerard Basgall. Sunny and an LAPD detective go to question Basgall, who admits to still being married to Erin and still loving her. Erin admits that she was one of Basgall's prostitutes, as well as his wife. She and Misty Tyler, who is really her sister Edith, began working for Basgall after their mother died.

Further investigation reveals that Buddy Bollen was looking for financing for his first Woman Warrior movie and found it in Boston mobster Moon Monaghan. L.A. film financier Arlo Delany had brokered the deal and provided Erin and Misty's sexual services for both Bollen and Monaghan.

Bollen decides to star Erin in his Woman Warrior movie. The movie turns out to be a big hit; however Buddy has Arlo cook the books to make it look like it made no money in order to stiff Moon Monaghan. Moon has Arlo killed as a warning to Buddy of what will happen if he doesn't get his money back. Misty gets scared and threatens to go to the police. Basgall gets into an argument with her and, during the struggle, accidentally breaks Misty's neck and kills her. Chief Stone and Sunny confront Erin and Gerard about this. Gerard claims that he killed Misty, while Erin claims that she killed her. Touched by the fact that the two try to protect the each other by taking the blame, Chief Stone decides they have suffered enough and lets them go on the condition that they promise not to avenge her.

A subplot involves Sunny's budding relationship with Jesse Stone.
