= The Judas Goat =

1978 novel by Robert B. Parker

- First edition
- Author: Robert B. Parker
- Language: English
- Series: Spenser
- Genre: Detective fiction
- Publisher: Houghton Mifflin
- Publication date: 1978
- Publication place: United States
- Media type: Hardcover, paperback, e-book
- Pages: 181
- ISBN: 0-395-26682-3
- OCLC: 3844295
- Dewey Decimal: 813/.5/4
- LC Class: PZ4.P244 Ju PS3566.A686
- Preceded by: Promised Land
- Followed by: Looking for Rachel Wallace

The Judas Goat is the fifth Spenser novel by Robert B. Parker, first published in 1978.

== Plot summary ==
A reclusive millionaire, Hugh Dixon, hires Spenser to find the nine members of a terrorist group that bombed a London restaurant where he and his family were dining, resulting in the deaths of his two daughters, his wife and leaving him a paraplegic. Spenser is promised US$2,500 a head for the apprehension of each of the nine terrorists responsible, dead or alive. Spenser heads to London, England to start his investigation. Running an ad for information in The Times results in two assassination attempts on Spenser. Spenser foils the attempts resulting in the deaths of two gunmen and the capture of another.

Spenser enlists the help of his friend Hawk, a powerful ally. Spenser tracks one of the members of the terrorist group, Liberty, and uses her as a Judas goat to lead him to other members.

"Katherine," the name she is operating under, flees to Copenhagen with Hawk and Spenser in pursuit. Spenser allows himself to be captured by Katherine's allies just to be rescued by Hawk before they can kill him. The rescue leads to the deaths of three more members of the group, but Katherine (also called Kathie) and the leader of the group, Paul, escape.

The group turns out to be an anti-communist/white-supremacist group trying to keep control of African countries away from the native Africans and in the hands of white countries and leaders. The bombing of the restaurant Dixon and his wife were in was more or less a random act of violence against the United Kingdom because of its backing of black majority rule in Africa.

Tired of running from Spenser and Hawk, Paul leaves the corpses of the last two members responsible for the bombing in Spenser and Hawk's hotel room. The last member, Kathie, is tied up on a bed. A note from Paul says these are the last members of the bombing, which was executed without his involvement. He couldn't kill Kathie because he had been intimate with her for some time. Hawk and Spenser untie Kathie and interrogate her, but she doesn't know where Paul has fled. Upon further reflection, she recalls he may be at the Olympics in Montreal, Quebec, Canada. Even though his obligations to Dixon are completed, the three of them fly to Montreal and rent a private home near the games. That night Kathie tries to seduce Spenser, but he rebuffs her.

Spenser flies to Boston to tell Dixon what is happening and asks him to assist them in stopping Paul. He tells Dixon he doesn't expect him to pay for it but Dixon insists on paying because he has great wealth but, since his family died, nothing worthwhile to spend it on. He also arranges to get Spenser tickets to the Olympic games. Spenser spends the night with his lover, Susan Silverman, and flies back to Canada the next day.

With little to go on, Hawk, Spenser and Kathie attend the games at the Stadium looking for Paul and a huge man, a former weightlifter, who Kathie warns may be with him: Zachary. Spenser spots Paul on their second day and observes him setting up a mark for a sniper. The next day Spenser spots Paul, accompanied by Zachary, assembling a sniper rifle to shoot athletes during an Olympic medal ceremony as a terrorist act.

All four men are armed, but Hawk quickly knocks out Paul. Zachary, a huge bodybuilder standing six foot seven and over three hundred pounds, attempts to shoot Spenser, but loses his gun in the scuffle. Trying to take down Zachary, the three remaining men all lose their weapons. Zachary flees the stadium pursued by Hawk and Spenser. He is eventually beaten into unconsciousness by them after a brutal fight a short distance from the stadium. The Montreal Police arrive and take Spenser and Hawk to a hospital. Spenser also has a broken left arm and nose; Hawk has a busted lip and one eye swollen shut. They learn Kathie shot Paul "as he attempted to flee," but both know she shot him the first chance she got for abandoning her.

When a Montreal police detective, Morgan, attempts to interrogate Spenser, he calls one of Dixon's men for instructions. It isn't long before Dixon arrives at the hospital and pays Spenser twice his promised fee, $50,000. Spenser offers half to Hawk, but he declines, just billing Spenser for his original fee ($150 per day plus expenses). Spenser lies to Dixon, saying Kathie is not part of the original nine responsible for the bombing and gets Dixon to have her released from jail. Dixon suspects the truth, but pays the fee anyway. The book concludes with Spenser and Susan vacationing together in London.
