= Painted Ladies (novel) =

2010 novel by Robert B. Parker

- First edition (publ. Putnam)
- Author: Robert B. Parker
- Language: English
- Publisher: Putnam
- Publication date: 2010
- ISBN: 978-0-399-15685-4 (first edition)
- Dewey Decimal: 813.54
- LC Class: PS3566.A686 P28

Painted Ladies, first published in 2010, is the 39th book in Robert B. Parker's Spenser series.

Spenser investigates the theft of a famous painting from the Hammond Museum.
