= A Catskill Eagle =

1985 novel by Robert B. Parker

- First edition
- Author: Robert B. Parker
- Language: English
- Series: Spenser
- Genre: Detective fiction
- Publisher: Delacorte Press/Dell
- Publication date: May 1, 1985
- Media type: Hardcover, paperback
- Pages: 311, 384
- ISBN: 0-385-29385-2
- OCLC: 11574237
- Dewey Decimal: 813/.54 19
- LC Class: PS3566.A686 C3 1985
- Preceded by: Valediction
- Followed by: Taming a Sea Horse

A Catskill Eagle is the 12th Spenser novel by Robert B. Parker, first published in 1985. The title comes from a quote from Herman Melville.

== Plot ==
Spenser is a private investigator in Boston. He had previously served as an infantryman in the 1st Infantry Division during the Korean War and was a State trooper, which have given him the physical skills, analytical mind and moral fortitude for his profession. At the start of the book, he is separated from his erstwhile lover Susan Silverman, who has relocated to the West Coast in an effort to "find herself."

Spenser receives a letter from Susan, explaining that his friend and associate, the gun for hire and fellow military veteran Hawk, is in jail and she needs help. It soon transpires that she has begun a relationship with wealthy heir, Russell Costigan, whose father is a powerful figure in their hometown. Hawk was jailed following an altercation with Russell. Spenser flies to San Francisco, California after making preparations to break Hawk out of jail using a gun hidden in the bottom of a fake leg cast. Spenser and Hawk then have to deal with a man rich enough to do anything he wants, legal or not. Spenser and Hawk follow Russell's trail across the country in an attempt to locate Susan and reunite her with Spenser. The book climaxes with a deadly encounter deep in an underground shelter between Spenser and the Costigans.
