= The Boxer and the Spy =

2008 novel by Robert B. Parker

- First edition (publ. Philomel Books)
- Author: Robert B. Parker
- Language: English
- Genre: Crime fiction
- Publisher: Philomel Books
- Publication date: 2008
- Publication place: United States
- Media type: Print
- Pages: 210 p.
- ISBN: 9780399247750
- OCLC: 155715155

The Boxer and the Spy (2008) is a crime novel for young adults by American author Robert B. Parker.

== Plot ==
In a quiet New England town, the body of shy teenager Jason Green washes up on the shore, and the police soon claim that the death was a suicide induced by steroid addiction. However, Terry Novak, a fifteen-year-old aspiring boxer, is not so sure, especially considering that Jason was an artistic person who had no interest in sports and thus was not the type to be taking such drugs.

Assisted by his friend Abby, he begins an investigation of his own, and soon learns that asking too many questions can lead him into serious danger.

== Reception ==
Kirkus Reviews called The Boxer and the Spy a "conventional mystery" that " features standard villains with some spice thrown in by the boxing leitmotif". Although they though the novel contained "nothing new", they highlighted "one nice twist", as well as "some nice action scenes and whodunit clues".

Booklist reviewed both the original book and audiobook narrated by Scott Brick.

In another review of the audiobook, AudioFile highlighted Brick's ability to play "each part with an emotional gravity that forces listeners to care and root for the characters".
