= Thin Air (Parker novel) =

1995 novel by Robert B. Parker

- First edition
- Author: Robert B. Parker
- Language: English
- Series: Spenser
- Genre: Detective novel
- Publisher: Putnams
- Publication date: 1995
- Publication place: United States
- Media type: Print (Hardcover, Paperback) & Audiobook
- Pages: 293 pp
- ISBN: 0-399-14020-4
- Preceded by: Walking Shadow
- Followed by: Chance

Thin Air is the 22nd Spenser novel by Robert B. Parker. The story follows Boston-based PI Spenser as he searches for the wife of his longtime associate, Sgt. Frank Belson of the Boston Police Department.

== Plot ==
Belson returns home one night to find his young wife, Lisa, missing, with no clue as to her whereabouts. He suspected that she may have left him, but circumstances seem to indicate she was kidnapped. Shortly after confiding in Spenser, Belson is shot returning home one night. Since he is unable to search for her himself as he is hospitalized, Spenser undertakes the search himself.

The investigation leads him to the impoverished town of Proctor where he has to uncover details of Lisa's life previous to meeting Belson to discover where she might be now.

== Reception ==
Tom C. Armstrong, of The Tennessean, regarded Thin Air as one of the three best Spenser novels.

== In other media ==
The novel was made into a 2000 TV movie, starring Joe Mantegna as Spenser.
