= Looking for Rachel Wallace =

1980 novel by Robert B. Parker

- First edition
- Author: Robert B. Parker
- Language: English
- Series: Spenser
- Genre: Detective fiction
- Publisher: Delacorte Press
- Publication date: 1980
- Publication place: United States
- Media type: print
- Pages: 219
- ISBN: 0-440-04764-1
- OCLC: 5412051
- Dewey Decimal: 813/.5/4
- LC Class: PZ4.P244 Lo PS3566.A686
- Preceded by: The Judas Goat
- Followed by: Early Autumn

Looking for Rachel Wallace is the sixth Spenser novel by Robert B. Parker, first published in 1980. It follows the titular Spenser guarding a radical feminist author, Rachel Wallace, who is kidnapped by a far-right extremist group. It received generally positive reviews, though it was not considered to be as good as several of the other novels in the series.

== Plot summary ==
Spenser is hired to protect a lesbian, feminist activist, the eponymous Rachel Wallace. Spenser defends her more vigorously than she would like and she fires him. Shortly afterwards, she is kidnapped and the police have almost nothing to go on. Though no longer officially employed to protect her, Spenser feels duty-bound to find her because he could have protected her if he had followed her orders and held onto the job.

His investigation leads him to an organization that is fiercely anti-communist, anti-gay, and loosely affiliated with the local Ku Klux Klan. Spenser gets free rein to operate because the police know that he can be more persuasive than they can in finding Rachel. A snowstorm paralyzes Boston and Spenser has to go on foot if he wants to get to Rachel Wallace before they kill her.

== Publication ==
Looking for Rachel Wallace was published in 1980 by Delacorte Press.

== Reception ==
Looking for Rachel Wallace received generally positive reviews. A common refrain was that it was altogether a solid novel, but not Parker's best work with Spenser. Spenser as a character was still popular with critics, although The New York Times's Newgate Callendar felt that Parker had "fallen in love with his hero". Wallace received mixed reception, with critics mixed on if she were a stereotypical radical feminist or not. The cast of villains were viewed more negatively, as simple standins with no redeeming qualities, and the plot was generally considered to be relatively basic, with the mystery being relatively easy to solve for readers. Despite this, many critics of the plot and characters considered the novel entertaining enough through its main character and action to make up for it. The Sun-Journal had particular praise for the depiction of Boston present in the novel.
