= Paper Doll (novel) =

1993 novel by Robert B. Parker

- First edition
- Author: Robert B. Parker
- Language: English
- Series: Spenser
- Genre: Detective fiction
- Publisher: Putnam
- Publication date: 1993
- Publication place: United States
- Media type: Print (hardback & paperback)
- Pages: 223 pp
- ISBN: 0-399-13818-8
- OCLC: 26635630
- Dewey Decimal: 813/.54 20
- LC Class: PS3566.A686 P33 1993
- Preceded by: Double Deuce
- Followed by: Walking Shadow

Paper Doll is the 20th Spenser novel by Robert B. Parker, published on May 1, 1993. The story follows the Boston-based PI Spenser as he tries to solve the apparently random killing of the well-regarded wife of a local businessman.

== Plot ==
The novel's hero is Spenser, a private investigator in Boston. Spenser, who served as an infantryman in the 1st Infantry Division during the Korean War and as a former State trooper, is hired by Boston aristocrat Loudon Tripp to investigate his wife's murder, and Spenser soon uncovers upper-class scandals and a corpse who might not be dead after all.
