= Stardust (Parker novel) =

Novel by Robert B. Parker

- First edition (publ. G. P. Putnam's Sons)
- Author: Robert B. Parker
- Language: English
- Publication date: 1990

Stardust is the 17th book in Robert B. Parker's Spenser series and first published in 1990.

== Plot ==
Spenser investigates the stalking of Jill Joyce, a TV star. Private investigator Spenser takes on a bodyguarding job, to protect a television actress, Jill Joyce, who has been getting harassing phone calls. While at first there is speculation that the attractive, alcohol-loving star may be exaggerating the incidents for attention, Spenser realizes there is a serious danger when her stunt double is murdered.

This book also features the first appearances of recurring Spenser characters Del Rio, Chollo, and Bobby Horse.
