= The Professional (novel) =

Book by Robert B. Parker

- First edition (publ. Putnam)
- Author: Robert B. Parker
- Language: English
- Publisher: Putnam
- Publication date: 2009
- ISBN: 978-0-399-15594-9 (first edition)
- LC Class: PS3566.A686 P75

The Professional is the 38th book in Robert B. Parker's Spenser series and first published in 2009.

Spenser investigates a man who is blackmailing the wives of Boston's wealthiest men.
