= Whispers of Immortality =

Poem by T. S. Eliot

- by T. S. Eliot
- First published in: Little Review 5.5
- Language: English
- Lines: 32

"Whispers of Immortality" is a poem by T. S. Eliot. Written sometime between 1915 and 1918, the poem was published originally in the September issue of the Little Review and was first collected in June 1919 in a volume entitled Poems published by Leonard and Virginia Woolf's Hogarth Press. "Whispers of Immortality" is one of the quatrain poems, a mode that Eliot had adapted from the mid-19th-century French poet Theophile Gautier. Its title is a faint parody of William Wordsworth's "Ode: Intimations of Immortality".

== Analysis ==
The poem was developed in two sections; each contains four stanzas and each stanza contains four lines. In the first section, Eliot paid homage to his great Jacobean masters, in whom he found the unified sensibility is a kind of "versified critique" of Jacobean writers, particularly Webster and Donne. Both Webster and Donne are praised by the narrator, the former for seeing the "skull beneath the skin" (l. 2), the latter for not seeking any "substitute for sense/ To seize and clutch and penetrate;/Expert beyond experience,.." (ll. 10–12). The apparent oxymoron of a "sense" that transcends beyond "experience" is followed by references to "the anguish of the marrow" (l. 13) and the uncontrollable "fever of the bone" (l. 16) that are too corporeal for mundane experience. The second section begins with a description of a modern Russian woman Grishkin whose “friendly bust/ Gives promise of pneumatic bliss" (ll. 19–20). In the following two stanzas, Grishkin is compared to the "Brazilian jaguar" which “does not in its arboreal gloom/ distil so rank a feline smell/ As Grishkin in a drawing room." (ll. 26–28) In the concluding stanza, the narrator said that even her charm is the subject of philosophy. Nevertheless, "our lot crawls between dry ribs/ To keep our metaphysics warm." (ll. 31–32).
