= Walking Shadow =

1994 novel by Robert B. Parker

- First edition
- Author: Robert B. Parker
- Language: English
- Series: Spenser
- Genre: Detective novel
- Publisher: Putnam
- Publication date: 1994
- Publication place: United States
- Media type: Print (Hardback & Paperback)
- Pages: 270 pp
- ISBN: 0-399-13920-6
- Preceded by: Paper Doll
- Followed by: Thin Air

Walking Shadow is the 21st Spenser novel by Robert B. Parker.

== Plot ==
The story follows Boston-based PI Spenser as he tries to solve the on-stage murder of an actor in the run-down town of Port City. While investigating the crime, he runs afoul of the local Chinese mob and uncovers a web of infidelity, organized crime, and psychologically unstable actors.

== Recurring characters ==
- Spenser
- Hawk
- Vinnie Morris
- Dr. Susan Silverman, Ph.D.
- Sgt. Frank Belson, Boston Police Department
- Healy

== In other media ==
The novel was made into a 2001 TV movie, starring Joe Mantegna as Spenser.

=== Cast ===
- Joe Mantegna as Spenser
- Marcia Gay Harden as Susan
- Ernie Hudson as Hawk
- Eric Roberts as Police Chief DeSpain
- Christopher Lawford as Jimmy Christopholous
- Tamlyn Tomita as Rikki Wu
