= God Save the Child =

1974 novel by Robert B. Parker

God Save The Child
- First edition (publ. Houghton Mifflin)
- Author: Robert B. Parker
- Language: English
- Publisher: Houghton Mifflin
- Publication date: 1974
- ISBN: 0-395-19955-7 (first edition)
- Dewey Decimal: 813.54
- LC Class: PZ4.P244 Gm

God Save The Child is the second book in Robert B. Parker's Spenser series and first published in 1974. In this tale, Spenser is hired to find Kevin Bartlett, a missing 15-year-old boy, by the child's parents. This novel introduces the detective's longtime love interest, Susan Silverman, and his friend Lieutenant Healy.

== Plot ==
At first, no one is sure whether Kevin was abducted or ran away. Eventually, however, a ransom note appears, demanding US$50,000 for his return. His well-to-do parents pay it, but do not get their son back in spite of a stakeout of the drop site.

Kevin's mother, Margery Bartlett, receives a death threat on the phone. Spenser takes on bodyguard duty instead of looking for Kevin. While Margery is shopping with Spenser's protection, the Bartlett's lawyer is found murdered in their residence. He was struck with a blunt object, breaking his neck.

Spenser checks out a steamer trunk that Kevin kept locked. In it, Spenser found magazines and pictures of a bodybuilder named Vic Harroway whom Kevin apparently admires. Spenser eventually finds Harroway's backwoods hideaway and observes Vic with Kevin, who is apparently with him on his own free will and not as a kidnap victim. Spenser eventually traces them to Boston, and a private apartment of Harroway, where he and Kevin have set up residence. He also witnesses Harroway making an exchange of cash for a briefcase from Dr. Croft, the Bartlett's family physician. Spenser uses this knowledge to leverage Croft into giving the details of the arrangement he has with Harroway for prostitution and drugs. He also reveals that they had a silent partner. To avoid having Croft tip off Harroway that they were closing in on him, he arranges with Lt. Healy to have Croft held until Harroway is captured and Kevin returned safely.

Spenser brings Kevin's parents to Boston to help retrieve him, no easy task since he is with Harroway by choice. Kevin believes Harroway is unbeatable, almost superhuman, and chooses to stay with him even after Harroway has beaten his parents in front of Kevin. Spenser, drawing on his experience as a professional boxer, fights Harroway, beats him, and proves to Kevin that Harroway can be beaten after all. Kevin returns to his parents and Harroway is arrested for murder. (He killed the Bartlett's lawyer when he and Kevin returned to his home to collect some personal items. The lawyer surprised them and Harroway killed him.)

Spenser goes to get Croft and discovers that he has been left in the local jail with Chief Trask, the inept head of local law enforcement where the Bartletts live. Spenser has a bad feeling about it and his worst fears are confirmed when he finds Croft dead in his cell. His suspicions are confirmed: Trask is the silent partner. Trask offers Spenser a cut of the take on the prostitution and drug money. Trask pulls a gun and Spenser disarms him. Spenser lets him know that he will call Lt. Healy with all the details and the book ends with Spenser telling him, "Start running..."
