= Sixkill =

2011 novel by Robert B. Parker

- First edition (publ. Putnam)
- Author: Robert B. Parker
- Language: English
- Publication date: 2011

Sixkill is the 40th book in Robert B. Parker's Spenser series and first published in 2011. It's the final book in the Spenser series written by Parker, who had died in 2010, before the book's release.

Spenser investigates actor Jumbo Nelson, who is accused of rape and murder.
