= Ace Atkins =

American journalist and author (born 1970)

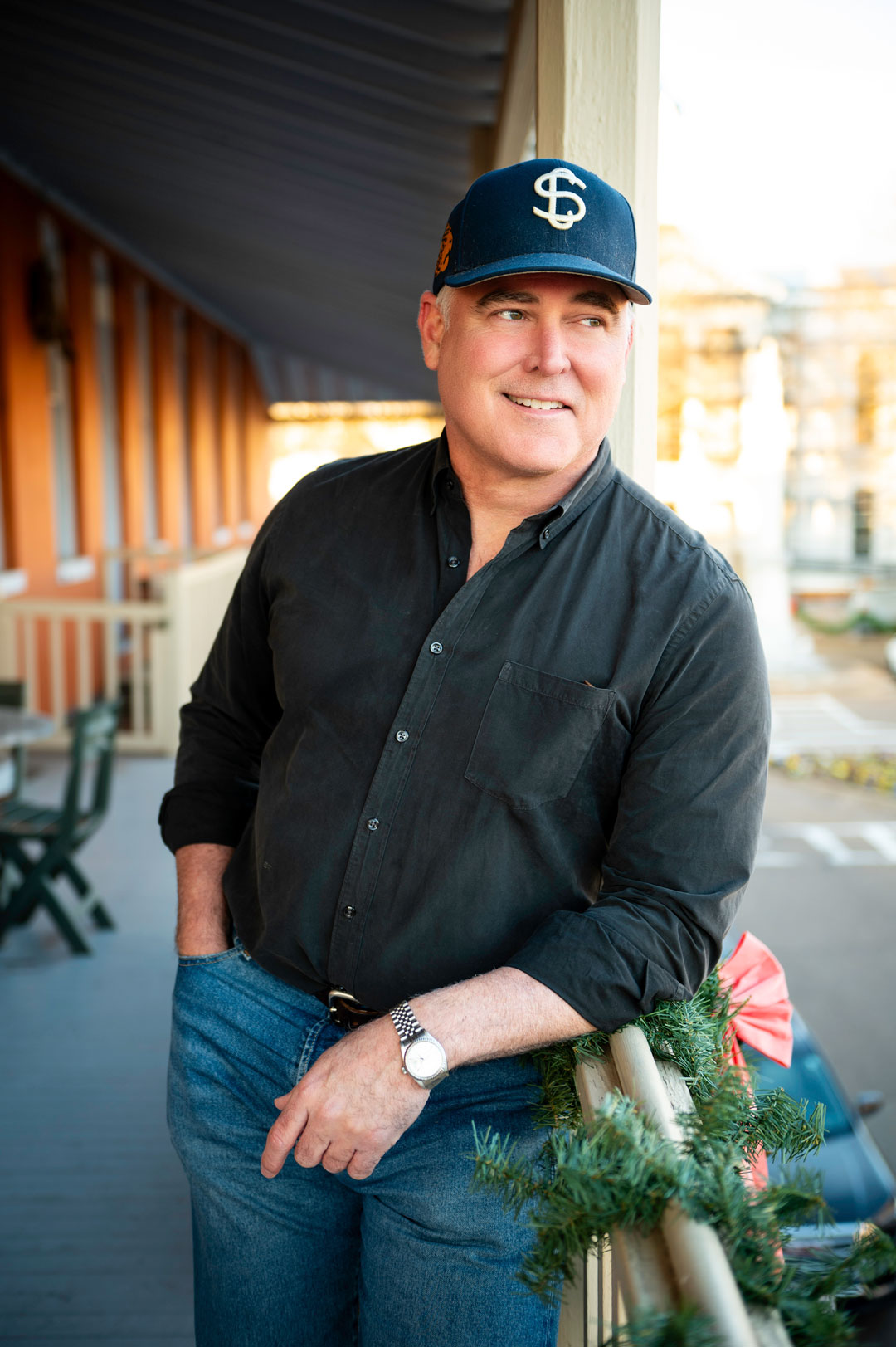
- Author Ace Atkins
- Born: June 28, 1970 (age 56)
- Education: Auburn University
- Occupation: Novelist
- Writing career
- Language: English
- Genres: Crime fiction, mystery
- Website: aceatkins.com

Ace Atkins (born June 28, 1970) is an American author and journalist, best known for his novels set in the southern United States.

== Biography ==
Atkins was born in Troy, Alabama and lived in cities including Buffalo, San Francisco, Detroit, St. Louis, and Atlanta growing up. His father, Billy Atkins, was an All Pro football player and coach in the NFL.

Atkins attended Auburn High School and Auburn University where he was a scholarship football player. Atkins lettered for the Auburn University football team in 1992 and 1993. In 1994, Atkins was featured on the cover of a special edition of Sports Illustrated celebrating the Tigers’ 1993 11-0 season. He graduated from Auburn University in 1994.

Atkins worked as a newspaper reporter for the St. Petersburg Times from 1995 until 1997 and The Tampa Tribune from 1997 until 2001 where he covered crime and law enforcement. His first novel Crossroad Blues was published by St. Martin’s Press in 1998. Greil Marcus said of this book, “Atkins has endless fun with material that has tortured so many writers before him. Crossroad Blues is a riot of Johnson lore, driven by the sort of stories generations of blues researchers would have sacrificed their children and parents to nail down.”

Atkins has written eleven books in the Quinn Colson series, stories featuring an honest Southern sheriff and set in the fictional Tibbehah County in rural northeast Mississippi. The series is strongly inspired by the myth of Buford Pusser.

In 2011, Atkins was hired by the family of the late Robert B. Parker to continue the Spenser series. He contributed ten novels in that series.

== Recognition ==
Atkins is the recipient of the Richard Wright Literary Excellence Award, the 2026 Harper Lee Award, the Hall-Waters Prize, and is a member of the Alabama Writers Hall of Fame.

Atkins has been nominated for the Edgar Award three times. In 2010, he was nominated for his short story, “Last Fair Deal Gone Down.” In 2012, he was nominated for Best Novel for The Ranger, and in 2013 he was nominated for Best Novel for The Lost Ones. The Innocents was named one of “The 10 Best Crime Novels of 2016” by The New York Times in 2016. In 2017, Atkins won the Scribe Award for Robert B. Parker’s Slow Burn.

== Critical reception ==
Publishers Weekly called Dark End of the Street a, “fast-paced, hot and heavy Southern suspense yarn.”

== Adaptations ==
Atkins’ 2024 novel, Don’t Let the Devil Ride is being developed into a TV series by Tomorrow Studios with Cheo Coker as head writer and showrunner.

In 2020, HBO announced they are developing the Quinn Colson novels as a TV series.

Spenser Confidential (2020), starring Mark Wahlberg, Alan Arkin, Winston Duke, and Post Malone and based on Atkins’ Robert B Parker’s Wonderland, was adapted and released by Netflix.

== Personal life ==
Atkins is married and has two children. Since 2001, he’s lived in Oxford, Mississippi.

== Bibliography ==
=== Nick Travers ===
- Crossroad Blues (1998, St. Martin’s Press)
- Leavin' Trunk Blues (2000, St. Martin’s Press)
- Dark End of the Street (2002, William Morrow)
- Dirty South (2004,William Morrow)
- "Last Fair Deal Gone Down" (short story published in the 10th anniversary edition of Crossroad Blues) (2008)
- "From Four Til Late" (short story) (2025, Carrefour Ltd.)

=== Quinn Colson ===
- The Ranger (2011, G.P. Putnam’s Sons)
- The Lost Ones (2012, G.P. Putnam’s Sons)
- The Broken Places (2013, G.P. Putnam’s Sons)
- The Forsaken (2014, G.P. Putnam’s Sons)
- The Redeemers (2015, G.P. Putnam’s Sons)
- The Innocents (2016, G.P. Putnam’s Sons)
- The Fallen (2017, G.P. Putnam’s Sons)
- The Sinners (2018, G.P. Putnam’s Sons)
- The Shameless (2019, G.P. Putnam’s Sons)
- The Revelators (2020, G.P. Putnam’s Sons)
- The Heathens (2021, G.P. Putnam’s Sons)

=== Robert B. Parker's Spenser ===
- Robert B. Parker's Lullaby (2012, G.P. Putnam’s Sons)
- Robert B. Parker's Wonderland (2013, G.P. Putnam’s Sons)
- Robert B. Parker's Cheap Shot (2014, G.P. Putnam’s Sons)
- Robert B. Parker's Kickback (2015, G.P. Putnam’s Sons)
- Robert B. Parker's Slow Burn (2016, G.P. Putnam’s Sons)
- Robert B. Parker's Little White Lies (2017, G.P. Putnam’s Sons)
- Robert B. Parker's Old Black Magic (2018, G.P. Putnam’s Sons)
- Robert B. Parker's Angel Eyes (2019, G.P. Putnam’s Sons)
- Robert B. Parker’s Someone To Watch Over Me (2020, G.P. Putnam’s Sons)
- Robert B. Parker's Bye Bye Baby (2022, G.P. Putnam’s Sons)

=== Porter Hayes ===
- Don’t Let the Devil Ride (2024, William Morrow)
- The Midnight Hour (2027)

=== Standalone ===
- White Shadow (2006, G.P. Putnam’s Sons)
- Wicked City (2008, Penguin Publishing)
- Devil's Garden (2009, G.P. Putnam’s Sons)
- Infamous (2010, G.P. Putnam’s Sons)
- "The Havana Run" (short story) (2024, Amazon Original Stories)
- Everybody Wants to Rule the World (2025, William Morrow)

== See also ==
- List of Auburn University people
