= Rough Weather =

Book by Robert B. Parker

- First edition (publ. Putnam)
- Author: Robert B. Parker
- Language: English
- Publisher: Putnam
- Publication date: 2008
- ISBN: 978-0-399-15519-2 (first edition)
- Dewey Decimal: 813.54
- LC Class: PS3566.A686 R68

Rough Weather is the 36th book in Robert B. Parker's Spenser series and first published in 2008 by Putnam.

Spenser is hired as a bodyguard at an exclusive wedding, and witnesses the kidnapping of the bride.
