= Promised Land (novel) =

1976 novel by Robert B. Parker

- First edition
- Author: Robert B. Parker
- Language: English
- Series: Spenser
- Genre: Detective fiction
- Publisher: Houghton Mifflin
- Publication date: 1976
- Publication place: United States
- Pages: 182
- ISBN: 0-395-24771-3
- Preceded by: Mortal Stakes
- Followed by: The Judas Goat

Promised Land is the fourth Spenser novel by Robert B. Parker, published in 1976. It won the Edgar Award for Best Novel in 1977. It is notable for introducing the character of Hawk.

== Plot summary ==
Promised Land, Inc. is the name of a real estate development company belonging to Harvey Shepard and Spenser also metaphorically refers to the Cape Cod area as the Promised Land.

Spenser is hired by Harvey Shepard to find his runaway wife, Pam. Spenser soon locates her, but promises not to force her to return to her husband against her will. He begins to suspect that Harvey Shepard has been threatened by King Powers (a big-time loan shark) when he sees his enforcer Hawk at Shepard's house. Harvey fires Spenser because Spenser refuses to disclose Pam's location; Pam is staying with two militant feminists named Rose and Jane. Pam soon becomes entangled in Rose and Jane's bank robbery that resulted in the shooting death of a bank guard and calls Spenser for help. Spenser's dilemma is that he wants to reunite Harvey and Pam while also making sure that Rose and Jane go down for the bank guard's murder while simultaneously setting up King Powers to go to prison. He has to do all this while somehow managing to keep the Shepards (and himself) out of jail and still breathing. He manages to broker a gun deal to between Powers and the militants, while corresponding with the police to arrest the suspects in a sting operation with the intent of keeping the Shepards clean of the affair. Spenser warns Hawk the day of the operation while Powers, his henchmen, and Jane and Rose are arrested. The next day, Powers is bailed out of jail and his associates greet Spenser and Susan at the Shepards' home. After a brief scuffle, Hawk intervenes and leaves Powers to the mercy of Spenser.
