= Sudden Mischief =

1998 book by Robert B. Parker

- Author: Robert B. Parker
- Publisher: G. P. Putnam's Sons
- Publication date: May 1, 1999
- ISBN: 9780399146961

Sudden Mischief is the 25th book in Robert B. Parker's Spenser series and first published in 1998.

Spenser investigates sexual harassment charges against Susan Silverman's ex-husband.
