= Hush Money (novel) =

1999 novel by Robert B. Parker

- First edition (publ. G.P. Putnam & Son)
- Author: Robert B. Parker
- Language: English
- Publication date: 1999

Hush Money is the 26th book in Robert B. Parker's Spenser series and first published in 1999.

Spenser investigates university politics when Robinson Nevins is denied university tenure.
