= Hugger Mugger (novel) =

2000 novel

- First edition (publ. G. P. Putnam's Sons)
- Author: Robert B. Parker
- Language: English
- Publication date: 2000

Hugger Mugger is the 27th book in Robert B. Parker's Spenser series and first published in 2000.

Spenser investigates who is threatening a horse named Hugger Mugger.
