= Playmates (novel) =

Novel by Robert B. Parker

- First edition (publ. G.P. Putnam's Sons)
- Author: Robert B. Parker
- Language: English
- Publisher: G.P. Putnam's Sons
- Publication date: 1989
- Dewey Decimal: 813.54
- LC Class: PS3566.A686 P5

Playmates is the 16th book in Robert B. Parker's Spenser series and first published in 1989.

Spenser investigates a point shaving scheme involving the Taft University basketball team.
