= Hundred-Dollar Baby =

2006 novel by Robert B. Parker

Hundred-dollar Baby
- First edition
- Author: Robert B. Parker
- Language: English
- Series: Spenser
- Genre: Detective novel
- Publisher: Putnam Adult
- Publication date: 2006
- Publication place: United States
- Media type: Print (hardback & paperback) and Audio CD
- Pages: 320 pp
- ISBN: 0-399-15376-4
- OCLC: 70483445
- Dewey Decimal: 813/.54 22
- LC Class: PS3566.A686 H86 2006
- Preceded by: School Days
- Followed by: Now and Then

Hundred-Dollar Baby is the 34th Spenser novel by Robert B. Parker. The story follows Boston-based PI Spenser as he tries to help an old runaway prostitute he helped several years earlier, April Kyle.

== Plot ==
April Kyle appears in Spenser's office after several years without any contact. She's been put in charge of a new upscale brothel by her mentor, the madame Patricia Utley. She says she's being harassed by someone who wants her to pay an extraordinary protection fee. Thugs appear and scare off her customers. Spenser and Hawk manage to fend off the thugs, but things are not as they seem as soon as Spenser starts asking questions. April begs him to stop investigating, but, Spenser being Spenser, can't stop until he unravels the mystery. What surfaces is a web of deceit, greed and the fragile psyche of April Kyle.

== Recurring characters ==
- Spenser
- Hawk
- April Kyle
- Dr. Susan Silverman, Ph.D.
- Cpt. Martin Quirk, Boston Police Department
- Sgt. Frank Belson, Boston Police Department
- Tedy Sapp
- Patricia Utley
- Tony Marcus
  - Leonard
  - Ty-Bop
  - Junior
