= Cold Service =

2005 novel by Robert B. Parker

- First edition (publ. G. P. Putnam's Sons)
- Author: Robert B. Parker
- Language: English
- Publisher: G. P. Putnam's Sons
- Publication date: 2005
- ISBN: 0-399-15240-7 (first edition, hardcover)
- Dewey Decimal: 813.54
- LC Class: PS3566.A686 C65

Cold Service is the 32nd book in Robert B. Parker's Spenser series and first published in 2005.

Hawk is injured protecting a bookie, and Spenser helps to rehabilitate him.
