= Widow's Walk (novel) =

2002 book by Robert B. Parker

- First edition (publ. Putnam)
- Author: Robert B. Parker
- Language: English
- Publisher: Putnam
- Publication date: 2002
- Publication place: United States
- ISBN: 9780399148453
- Dewey Decimal: 813/.54
- LC Class: PS3566.A686 W53

Widow's Walk (2002) is a detective novel by American crime writer Robert B. Parker, part of his Spenser series.

== Plot summary ==
Boston bank manager Nathan Smith has been shot through the head while lying in bed. His new wife Mary, is the chief suspect, although she swears she was watching television at the time and never even heard the gunshot. Despite mounting evidence against her, and a prosecution witness who claims Mary hired him to kill her husband, the defence make a last-ditch attempt at proving her innocence by hiring Spenser, the Boston-based P.I. However, everyone Spenser speaks with is systematically murdered.
