= The Widening Gyre (novel) =

1983 novel by Robert B. Parker

- First edition (publ. Delacorte Press)
- Author: Robert B. Parker
- Language: English
- Publication date: 1983

The Widening Gyre is a 1983 novel by Robert B. Parker, featuring his private detective character Spenser. The title comes from the first line of W. B. Yeats poem "The Second Coming".

== Story ==
Spenser is hired to head up the security detail for Congressman Meade Alexander as he runs for the Senate. The congressman confides to Spenser that he is being blackmailed by someone who wants him to drop out of the senate race. The congressman's wife Ronni drinks too much and there is an explicit sex tape of her and a much younger man. Spenser's assignment is to get the original tape and stop the blackmail before Ronni finds out. His investigation leads to Joe Broz's son Gerry and dealing with the Broz organization is always potentially lethal.

== Characters ==
- Spenser
- Susan Silverman
- Hawk
- Martin Quirk
- Congressman Meade Alexander
- Ronni Alexander
- Congressman Robert Browne
- Gerry Broz
- Joe Broz
- Vinnie Morris
