= Chance (Parker novel) =

1996 novel by Robert B. Parker

- Author: Robert B. Parker
- Language: English
- Publisher: G.P. Putnam’s Sons
- Publication date: April 1, 1997
- ISBN: 978-0399146886

Chance is the 23rd book in Robert B. Parker's Spenser series and first published in 1996. Spenser investigates the disappearance of the husband of mafia princess Shirley Meeker.
