= Pale Kings and Princes =

1987 novel by Robert B. Parker

- First edition
- Author: Robert B. Parker
- Language: English
- Series: Spenser
- Genre: Detective fiction
- Publisher: Delacorte Press
- Publication date: June 1987
- Publication place: United States
- Media type: Print (hardback & paperback)
- Pages: 256 pp
- ISBN: 978-0-385-29538-3
- OCLC: 14818248
- Dewey Decimal: 813/.54 19
- LC Class: PS3566.A686 P3 1987
- Preceded by: Taming a Sea Horse
- Followed by: Crimson Joy

Pale Kings and Princes is a 1987 Spenser novel by Robert B. Parker. The title is taken from John Keats's poem La Belle Dame sans Merci: A Ballad. Following the murder of a reporter, Spenser is hired by a newspaper to investigate drug smuggling around the area of Wheaton, Massachusetts. There he encounters many troubles, including the death of a policeman and his son. Spenser, with the help of his friend, Hawk, eventually secures the downfall of the local cartel.

An adaptation of the novel was released as a made-for-TV movie in 1993.
