= Valediction (novel) =

1984 novel by Robert B. Parker

- First edition (publ. Delacorte Press)
- Author: Robert B. Parker
- Language: English
- Publisher: Delacorte Press
- Publication date: 1984
- Dewey Decimal: 813.54
- LC Class: PS3566.A686 V3

Valediction is the 11th book in Robert B. Parker's Spenser series and first published in 1984.

Spenser, a private investigator in Boston, who served as an infantryman in the 1st Infantry Division during the Korean War, and as a former State trooper, investigates the kidnapping of a young dancer by a religious sect.
