= Robert B. Parker =

American crime writer (1932–2010)

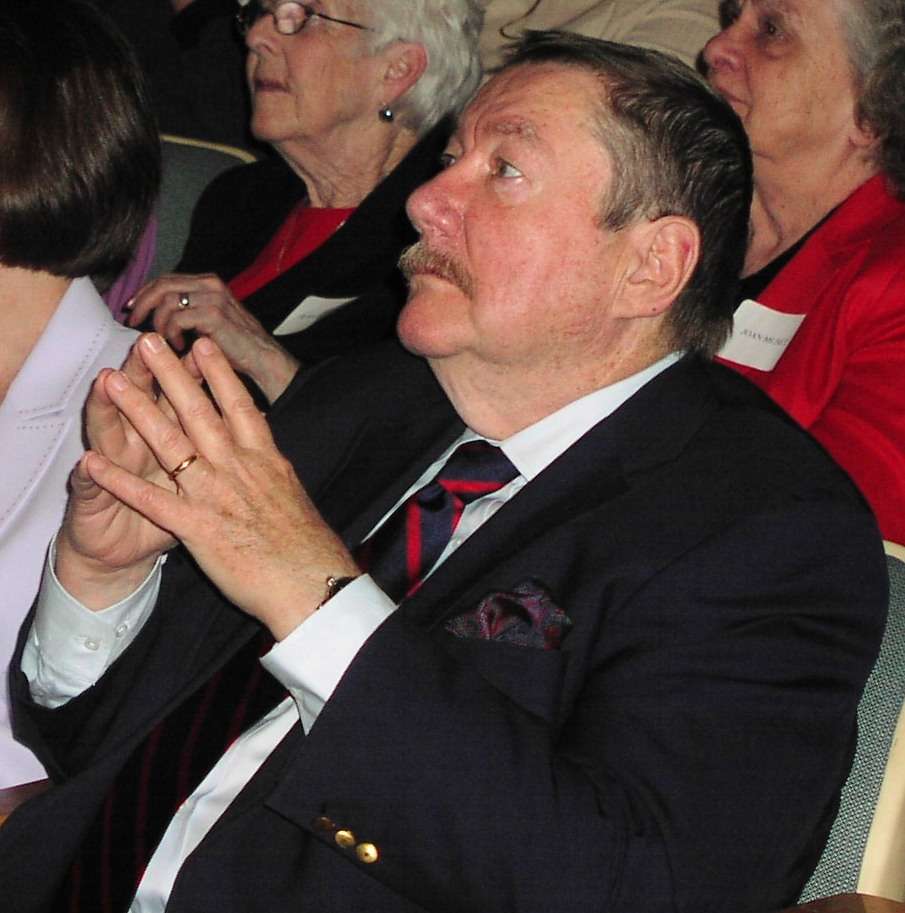
- Parker in 2006
- Born: Robert Brown Parker; September 17, 1932; Springfield, Massachusetts, U.S.
- Died: January 18, 2010 (aged 77); Cambridge, Massachusetts, U.S.
- Occupation: Novelist
- Spouse: Joan Hall Parker (m. 1956)
- Children: 2
- Writing career
- Period: 1974–2010
- Genres: Detective fiction, Western fiction
- Notable works: Spenser series Jesse Stone series Sunny Randall series
- Website: robertbparker.net

Robert Brown Parker (September 17, 1932 – January 18, 2010) was an American writer, primarily of fiction within the mystery/detective genre. His most famous works include the 40 novels written about the fictional private detective Spenser. In the mid-1980s, based on the character of detective Spenser, ABC television network developed the television series Spenser: For Hire. A series of TV movies was also produced based on the same character. His works incorporate encyclopedic knowledge of the Boston metropolitan area. The Spenser novels have been cited as reviving and changing the detective genre by critics and bestselling authors, including Robert Crais, Harlan Coben, and Dennis Lehane.

Parker also wrote nine novels featuring Jesse Stone, a Los Angeles police officer who moves to a small New England town; six novels with Sunny Randall, a female private investigator; and four Westerns starring the duo Virgil Cole and Everett Hitch. The first was Appaloosa, made into a film starring Ed Harris and Viggo Mortensen. The Jesse Stone books were adapted into a series of TV films starring Tom Selleck.

Following Parker's death, authorized continuations of his works have been penned by other authors.

== Early life and education ==
Parker was born in Springfield, Massachusetts. In 1956, Parker married Joan H. Parker, whom he claimed to have met as a toddler at a birthday party. They spent their childhoods in the same neighborhood.

After earning a Bachelor of Arts degree from Colby College in Waterville, Maine, Parker served as a soldier in the US Army Infantry in Korea. In 1957, he earned his master's degree in English literature from Boston University and then worked in advertising and technical writing until 1962. Parker received a PhD in English literature from Boston University in 1971. His dissertation, titled "The Violent Hero, Wilderness Heritage, and Urban Reality," discussed the exploits of fictional private-eye heroes created by Dashiell Hammett, Raymond Chandler, and Ross Macdonald.

== Career ==
Parker wrote his first novel in 1971 while teaching at Northeastern University. He became a full professor in 1976, and turned to full-time writing in 1979, with five Spenser novels to his credit.

Parker's popular Spenser novels are known for his characters of varied races and religions. According to critic Christina Nunez, Parker's "inclusion of [characters of] other races and sexual persuasions" lends his writings a "more modern feel". For example, the Spenser series characters include Hawk and Chollo, African American and Mexican American, respectively, as well as Spenser's Jewish girlfriend, Susan, various Russians, Ukrainians, Chinese, a gay cop, Lee Farrell, and even a gay mob boss, Gino Fish. The homosexuality of both his sons gave his writing "[a] sensibility," Ms. Nunez feels, "[which] strengthens Parker's sensibility [toward gays]." In 1985, Spenser was made into a successful television series, Spenser for Hire, which starred Robert Urich, Avery Brooks, and Barbara Stock.

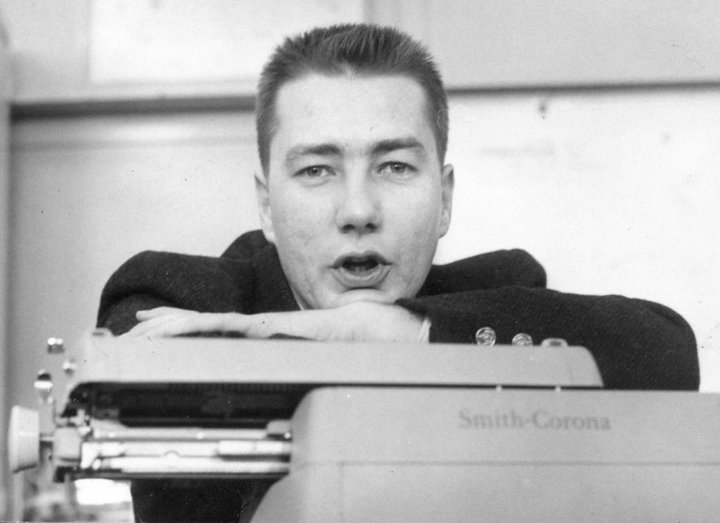
Robert B. Parker at his desk at Prudential in 1959

In 1994, Parker collaborated with Japanese photographer Kasho Kumagai on Spenser's Boston, a coffee-table book that explores the city through Spenser's eyes via high quality, four-color photos. In addition to Parker's introduction, excerpts from several of the Spenser novels were included.

Parker created female detective Sunny Randall at the request of actress Helen Hunt, who wanted him to write a part for her to play. He wrote the first book, and the film version was planned for 2000, but never materialized. His publisher liked the character, though, and asked him to continue with the series.

Another figure created by Parker was Jesse Stone, an alcoholic former LAPD detective, who starts a new career as a police chief in a small New England town. Between 1997 and 2010, he wrote nine novels featuring Jesse Stone, all of which have been adapted as a series of TV movies by CBS starring Tom Selleck as Jesse Stone.

Aside from crime writing, Parker also produced several Western novels, including Appaloosa, and children's books. Like Parker's Spenser series, his Westerns have received critical attention. Chris Dacus, who has written on other authors including Cormac McCarthy, has written of the intellectual depth and importance of Parker's Westerns in The Stoic Western Hero: Robert B. Parker's Westerns.

Parker and his wife created an independent film company called Pearl Productions, based in Boston. It was named after their German Shorthaired Pointer, Pearl.

== Personal life ==
Parker and his wife, Joan, had two sons, David and Daniel. Originally, the character of Spenser was to have been called "David", but Parker did not want to appear to favor one of his sons over the other, so Parker omitted Spenser's first name entirely, and it was never revealed.

Parker and his wife separated at one point, but then came to an unusual arrangement. They lived in a three-story Victorian house just outside of Harvard Square; she lived on one floor and he on another, and they shared the middle floor. This living arrangement is mirrored in Spenser's private life: his girlfriend, Susan, had an aversion to marriage and living together full-time. Living separately suited them both, although they were fully committed to each other. Explaining the arrangement in an interview on CBS Sunday Morning, Parker said, "I want to make love to my wife for the rest of my life, but I never want to sleep with her again."

Joan Parker, the inspiration for the Susan Silverman character in the Spenser series, died June 12, 2013.

He had a great fondness for dogs, including German Shorthair Pointers. Dogs were included in his Spenser stories, aging along with the character and appearing in the ongoing series of novels. The dogs were always named Pearl.

Parker's favorite books were The Bear, The Great Gatsby, Hamlet, Adventures of Huckleberry Finn, The Maltese Falcon, The Love Song of J. Alfred Prufrock, Dubliners, The Big Sleep, U.S.A. trilogy, and The Ambassadors.

=== Awards ===
Parker received three nominations and two Edgar Awards from the Mystery Writers of America. He received the first award, the "Best Novel Award" in 1977, for the fourth novel in the Spenser series, Promised Land. In 1983, he received the Maltese Falcon Award, Japan, for Early Autumn. In 1990, he shared, with wife Joan, a nomination for "Best Television Episode" for the TV series B.L. Stryker, but the award went to David J. Burke and Alfonse Ruggiero Jr. for Wiseguy.

In 2002, he received the Grand Master Award Edgar for his collective oeuvre.

Parker received the 2002 Joseph E. Connor Memorial Award from the Phi Alpha Tau Fraternity at Emerson College. He was inducted into the fraternity as an honorary brother in spring 2003.

In 2008, he was awarded the Gumshoe Lifetime Achievement Award.

== Death ==
Parker was 77 when he died suddenly of a heart attack at his home in Cambridge, Massachusetts, on January 18, 2010; discovered at his desk by his wife Joan, he had been working on a novel.

== Works ==
=== Novels ===
Title	Year	ISBN	Series	Notes
The Godwulf Manuscript	1973	0-395-18011-2	Spenser 01	
God Save the Child	1974	0-395-19955-7	Spenser 02	First appearance of Susan Silverman
Mortal Stakes	1975	0-395-21969-8	Spenser 03	
Promised Land	1976	0-395-24771-3	Spenser 04	Edgar Award, Best Novel; first appearance of Hawk
The Judas Goat	1978	0-395-26682-3	Spenser 05	
Wilderness	1979	0-385-29108-6		
Looking for Rachel Wallace	1980	0-385-28558-2	Spenser 06	
Early Autumn	1980	0-385-28242-7	Spenser 07	1983 Maltese Falcon Award
A Savage Place	1981	0-385-28951-0	Spenser 08	
Ceremony	1982	0-385-28127-7	Spenser 09	
The Widening Gyre	1983	0-385-29220-1	Spenser 10	
Love and Glory	1983	0-385-29261-9		Set at Taft University
Valediction	1984	0-385-29330-5	Spenser 11	
A Catskill Eagle	1985	0-385-29385-2	Spenser 12	
Taming a Sea-Horse	1986	0-385-29461-1	Spenser 13	
Pale Kings and Princes	1987	0-385-29538-3	Spenser 14	
Crimson Joy	1988	0-385-29668-1	Spenser 15	
Playmates	1989	0-399-13463-8	Spenser 16	Set at Taft University
Poodle Springs	1989	0-399-13482-4	Philip Marlowe 1	Completing the 1958 Raymond Chandler novel - The first four chapters are written by Raymond Chandler
Stardust	1990	0-399-13537-5	Spenser 17	
Pastime	1991	0-399-13630-4	Spenser 18	
Perchance to Dream	1991	0-399-13580-4	Philip Marlowe 2	Sequel to The Big Sleep
Double Deuce	1992	0-399-13754-8	Spenser 19	
Paper Doll	1993	0-399-13818-8	Spenser 20	
Walking Shadow	1994	0-399-13961-3	Spenser 21	
All Our Yesterdays	1994	0-385-30437-4		
Thin Air	1995	0-399-14063-8	Spenser 22	
Chance	1996	0-399-14688-1	Spenser 23	
Small Vices	1997	0-399-14547-8	Spenser 24	
Night Passage	1997	0-399-14304-1	Jesse Stone 1	
Trouble in Paradise	1998	0-399-14433-1	Jesse Stone 2	
Sudden Mischief	1998	0-399-14696-2	Spenser 25	
Hush Money	1999	0-399-14458-7	Spenser 26	
Family Honor	1999	0-399-14566-4	Sunny Randall 1	
Perish Twice	2000	0-399-14668-7	Sunny Randall 2	
Hugger Mugger	2000	0-399-14587-7	Spenser 27	
Gunman's Rhapsody	2001	0-399-14762-4		Wyatt Earp in 1879
Death in Paradise	2001	0-399-14779-9	Jesse Stone 3	
Potshot	2001	0-399-14710-1	Spenser 28	
Widow's Walk	2002	0-399-14845-0	Spenser 29	
Shrink Rap	2002	0-399-14930-9	Sunny Randall 3	
Back Story	2003	0-399-14977-5	Spenser 30	Includes Jesse Stone
Stone Cold	2003	0-399-15087-0	Jesse Stone 4	
Bad Business	2004	0-399-15145-1	Spenser 31	
Melancholy Baby	2004	0-399-15218-0	Sunny Randall 4	
Double Play	2004	0-399-15188-5		
Cold Service	2005	0-399-15240-7	Spenser 32	
Appaloosa	2005	0-399-15277-6	Cole & Hitch 1	
School Days	2005	0-399-15323-3	Spenser 33	
Hundred-Dollar Baby	2006	0-399-15376-4	Spenser 34	Also published as Dream Girl
Sea Change	2006	0-399-15267-9	Jesse Stone 5	
Blue Screen	2006	0-399-15351-9	Sunny Randall 5	Includes Jesse Stone
High Profile	2007	0-399-15404-3	Jesse Stone 6	Includes Sunny Randall
Spare Change	2007	0-399-15425-6	Sunny Randall 6	
Now and Then	2007	0-399-15441-8	Spenser 35	
Edenville Owls	2007	0-399-24656-8		
Stranger In Paradise	2008	0-399-15460-4	Jesse Stone 7	
The Boxer and the Spy	2008	0-399-24775-0		
Rough Weather	2008	0-399-15519-8	Spenser 36	
Resolution	2008	0-399-15504-X	Cole & Hitch 2	
Brimstone	2009	0-399-15571-6	Cole & Hitch 3	
Chasing the Bear	2009	0-399-24776-9	Spenser 37 (prequel)	"Young Spenser"
Night and Day	2009	0-399-15541-4	Jesse Stone 8	Includes Sunny Randall
The Professional	2009	0-399-15594-5	Spenser 38	
Split Image	2010	0-399-15623-2	Jesse Stone 9	Published posthumously, includes Sunny Randall
Blue-Eyed Devil	2010	0-399-15648-8	Cole & Hitch 4	Published posthumously
Painted Ladies	2010	0-399-15685-2	Spenser 39	Published posthumously
Sixkill	2011	0-399-15726-3	Spenser 40	Published posthumously
Silent Night	2013	0-425-27161-7	Spenser 41	Unfinished, completed by literary agent Helen Brann

==== Series continuations ====
After Parker died, his family, together with Parker's publishers, chose to continue the Jesse Stone, Spenser, and Virgil Cole and Everett Hitch series. The book Parker was working on at the time of his death was completed by his literary agent Helen Bran.

Ace Atkins was selected to continue the Spenser novels following Parker's death. The Boston Globe wrote that while some people might have "viewed the move as unseemly, those people didn't know Robert B. Parker, a man who, when asked how his books would be viewed in 50 years, replied: 'Don't know, don't care.' He was proud of his work, but he mainly saw writing as a means of providing a comfortable life for his family." Atkins wrote 10 novels from the series from 2012 to 2022. Mike Lupica wrote three more from 2023 to 2025.

Fourteen Jesse Stone novels have been published since Parker's death. The first three were by Parker's longtime friend and collaborator, Michael Brandman, and the next six by Reed Farrel Coleman. Mike Lupica wrote three more from 2020 to 2022. Christopher Farnsworth continued the series with two more books in 2025 and 2026.

Parker's Virgil Cole and Everett Hitch series was continued by actor and screenwriter Robert Knott.

The Sunny Randall series continued with Blood Feud (November 27, 2018), Grudge Match (May 4, 2020), Payback (2021), and Revenge Tour (2022). The books were written by Parker's friend, sports journalist Mike Lupica. The eleventh and twelfth books in the Sunny Randall series, Bad Influence and Buzzkill, were written by Alison Gaylin and published in 2023 and 2024.

=== Nonfiction ===
- Sports Illustrated Training with Weights (with John R. Marsh) (1974) ISBN 1-56800-032-4
- Three Weeks in Spring (with Joan H. Parker) (1982) ISBN 0-395-26282-8
- A Year At The Races (with Joan H. Parker) (1990) ISBN 0-670-82678-2
- Spenser's Boston (with Kasho Kumagai) (1994) ISBN 978-1883402501

=== Short fiction ===
"Surrogate"' (1991)" A short story published in the crime anthology New Crimes 3 ISBN 0-88184-737-2
