= Robert M. Stevens =

Robert M. Stevens is a cinematographer and occasional actor.

== Filmography ==
=== Film ===
Year	Title	Director	Notes
1988	The Naked Gun: From the Files of Police Squad!	David Zucker	
1988	Honor Bound	Jeannot Szwarc	
1989	The 'Burbs	Joe Dante	
1990	Tune in Tomorrow	Jon Amiel	
1991	The Naked Gun 2½: The Smell of Fear	David Zucker	
1991	Delirious	Tom Mankiewicz	
1992	Beyond the Law	Larry Ferguson	
1994	Naked Gun 33 1/3: The Final Insult	Peter Segal	
1994	Serial Mom	John Waters	
1997	The Man Who Knew Too Little	Jon Amiel	
1998	Pecker	John Waters	
1999	Simply Irresistible	Mark Tarlov	
2000	Cecil B. Demented	John Waters	
2000	Labor Pains	Tracy Alexson	
2000	Dude, Where's My Car?	Danny Leiner	
2004	Temptation	Mark Tarlov	With Karl Levin
2007	Kickin' It Old Skool	Harvey Glazer	
2007	After Midnight	Rob Walker	Direct-to-video
2009	House Broken	Sam Harper	With Vincent Creazzo

=== Television ===
Year	Title	Director	Notes
1985-1987	Amazing Stories		19 episodes
1986-1988	The Wonderful World of Disney	Oz Scott; Mick Garris; James Goldstone	Episodes "Mr. Boogedy", "Fuzzbucket" and "Earth Star Voyager"
1986	Amazing Stories	William Dear	Segment "Mummy Daddy"
1987	Max Headroom	Farhad Mann; Francis Delia	Episodes "Blipverts" and "Body Banks"
1993	Doogie Howser, M.D.	Mark Horowitz; Scott Goldstein; Dennis Dugan	3 episodes
1995	Fallen Angels	Steven Soderbergh; Tim Hunter; John Dahl; Keith Gordon	4 episodes
1998-1999	Seven Days	John McPherson; Charles Correll	Episodes "Pilot" (Part 1 and 2) and "Pinball Wizard"
2001	Lizzie McGuire		7 episodes
2003	CSI: Miami	Deran Sarafian	Episodes "Spring Break" and "Freaks and Tweaks"
2004	The Handler	Rob Bailey; Leon Ichaso	Episodes "The Wedding Party" and "The Big Fall"

TV movies

Year	Title	Director
1990	Fear	Rockne S. O'Bannon
1993	Taking the Heat	Tom Mankiewicz
1996	A Kidnapping in the Family	Colin Bucksey
1996	The People Next Door	Tim Hunter
1997	When Secrets Kill	Colin Bucksey
1997	Breast Men	Lawrence O'Neil
2000	H.U.D.	David Zucker
