= Melissa Hart =

Melissa Hart may refer to:

- Melissa Hart (actress), American stage actress
- Melissa Hart (judge) (1969–2026), American judge on Colorado Supreme Court
- Melissa Hart (politician) (born 1962), American politician
- Melissa Joan Hart (born 1976), American film and television actress
