= Prairie oyster (disambiguation) =

Prairie oyster may refer to:

- Rocky Mountain oysters, bull testicles eaten as food
- Prairie Oyster, a Canadian country band
- Prairie oyster (cocktail), a traditional hangover cure
