= Spenser: For Hire =

American crime drama television series (1985-1988)

- Title screen
- Genre: Crime drama
- Based on: Spenser by Robert B. Parker
- Developed by: John Wilder
- Starring: Robert Urich; Avery Brooks; Barbara Stock (1985–86, 1987–88); Ron McLarty; Carolyn McCormick (1986–87); Richard Jaeckel (1985–87)
- Composers: Steve Dorff; Larry Herbstritt
- Country of origin: United States
- Original language: English
- No. of seasons: 3
- No. of episodes: 66, and 4 TV movies (List of episodes)

Production
- Running time: approx. 48 minutes per episode
- Production companies: John Wilder Productions (1985–1986) (season 1); Jadda Productions (1986–1987) (season 2); Warner Bros. Television

Original release
- Network: ABC
- Release: September 20, 1985 – May 7, 1988

Related
- A Man Called Hawk

Spenser: For Hire is an American crime drama series based on Robert B. Parker's Spenser novels. The series, developed for TV by John Wilder and starring Robert Urich, was broadcast on ABC from September 20, 1985, until May 7, 1988.

== Production ==
The series ran on ABC from September 20, 1985, to May 7, 1988. Despite frequent time slot changes and occasional pre-emptions, the show garnered decent ratings. Location shooting ultimately led to the show's demise, with costs being cited as one of the main reasons why ABC cancelled it. Filmed largely in Boston, which was considered one of the show's strong points, it featured shots from many locations, even showing the harsh winters there (notably in the pilot). The show's music was produced by Steve Dorff and Larry Herbstritt.

The series was estimated to have generated $50 million for the Commonwealth of Massachusetts.

== Characters ==
=== Spenser ===
Spenser (Robert Urich) is the only name used for this character throughout the show. When introducing himself, he often says "Spenser with an 'S', like the poet." In "The Choice", it is revealed that Spenser fared poorly in a professional fight 12 years ago, but he still boxes and exercises at Henry Cimoli's Gym. He is well read, often quoting poetry in everyday conversation, and is an excellent cook, often making recipes he picks up from watching Julia Child on his kitchen counter television.

Spenser lives in Boston and drives distinctive cars. His first is a mildly worn-out, dark ivy green 1966 Ford Mustang, with back centered chrome wheels, which is destroyed at the beginning of the second season episode "The Long Hunt". It is succeeded by a new 1987 Mustang 5.0 GT which, nine episodes later in "Mary Hamilton", is traded for a perfectly restored dark ivy green 1966 Mustang with Keystone Mags which gets banged up over the remaining run of the show. In the TV films, he drives a red Ford Probe in the first two, then switches to a burgundy red 1967 Ford Mustang fastback for the final two films.

Spenser carries a Beretta 9mm pistol and acknowledges being a Vietnam War veteran in the series' pilot episode. Spenser was also a former member of the Boston police force and occasionally cooperates with the BPD in the series.

In "Children of a Tempest Storm", Susan Silverman (Barbara Stock) reveals that she is pregnant with Spenser's child. The word abortion comes up when talking with her doctor, and is discussed throughout the episode, though often not using the word. Susan and Spenser discuss the issue and are at odds over the moral dilemma. Spenser, a Catholic, does not know if he can stay with Susan, though he loves her deeply, if she aborts. He believes it is only for her convenience that she would choose abortion. In the end, she has the abortion, and he brings her flowers. They silently affirm that the relationship will continue. After Stock left the show, ADA Rita Fiori (Carolyn McCormick) becomes Spenser's love interest during the second season.

After his apartment goes up in flames in "No Room at the Inn", Spenser moves into a "firehouse", given to him by grateful local firefighters for saving the life of a firefighter at his apartment building. It is situated on the corner of River Street, near Mt. Vernon Square and Beacon Hill. In the second season, the Fire Department takes the station back and Spenser moves to a small top floor apartment in Charlestown, near the old Boston Navy Yard, which he now uses as his office. The third season finds him in the same apartment and with Susan again, upon her unexpected return.

=== Hawk ===
Hawk (Avery Brooks) is a smartly dressed, enigmatic enforcer with connections ranging from Beacon Hill to the Boston underworld. Though he is for hire, he has a code of ethics and assists Spenser. In the pilot episode ("Promised Land"), he and Spenser obviously have respect for each other, and he switches over from King Powers' (Chuck Connors) side to Spenser's side when he does not like Powers' actions. Hawk carries a Colt Python .357 Magnum as his weapon of choice.

=== Lt. Martin Quirk ===
Lt. Quirk (Richard Jaeckel) commands the Boston Police major crimes squad. He and Spenser have an uneasy, somewhat adversarial relationship, but often work well together. In the episode "Heart of the Matter", Quirk suffers an angina attack and reluctantly accepts the fact that he must retire after 35 years on the force.

=== Sgt. Frank Belson ===
Sgt. Belson (Ron McLarty) is Lt. Quirk's right-hand man, one of whose unofficial duties seems to be keeping an eye on Spenser. The overweight Belson is frequently seen eating and his character's role is often to provide comic relief, though he is also shown as being perfectly capable of carrying out serious police work when the occasion demands.

Robert Urich (right) as Spenser, Avery Brooks as Hawk

== Episodes ==
The series consisted of three seasons (1985–1988) with a total of 66 episodes, and was followed by a series of four made-for-TV movies (1993–1995).

== Home media ==
On June 28, 2005, Rykodisc released the four TV movies on DVD that were made following the cancellation of the weekly series. In 2007, Rykodisc re-released each of them separately.

DVD name	Ep #	Additional information
Spenser: The Movie Collection	4	Spenser: Ceremony; Spenser: Pale Kings And Princes; Spenser: The Judas Goat; Spenser: A Savage Place

In 2014, Warner Bros. released the first season on DVD via their Warner Archive Collection. This is a manufacture-on-demand (MOD) release, available through Warner's online store and Amazon.com. Warner's website explains that the initial disc run was pressed traditionally "to meet expected high consumer demand". The second and third seasons were released in 2015, followed by a box set with all three seasons in 2025.

DVD name	Ep #	Discs	Release date
The Complete First Season	23	6	August 26, 2014
The Complete Second Season	22	5	May 12, 2015
The Complete Third Season	21	5	September 1, 2015
The Complete Series	66	16	September 9, 2025

As of 2023, the series was available for streaming online on The Roku Channel and Tubi.

== Spin-offs and remakes ==
In 1989, after the show ended, Brooks starred in his own spin-off series, A Man Called Hawk.

From 1999 to 2001, Joe Mantegna played the detective in a series of three telemovies on A&E.

In an April 23, 2009 blog entry, Robert Parker stated that he was in talks with TNT to produce a remake of the series. However, Parker died in 2010 before these plans could take place.

The 2020 Netflix film Spenser Confidential is the first installment of a reboot of the series.

== Notable guest stars ==
- Angela Bassett
- Mathieu Carrière
- Patricia Clarkson
- Chuck Connors
- John Davidson
- Ruby Dee
- Laurence Fishburne
- Sarah Michelle Gellar
- Seth Green
- Lauren Holly
- Samuel L. Jackson
- Charles Kimbrough
- Eriq La Salle
- Melissa Leo
- Andie MacDowell
- William H. Macy
- Mako
- Frances McDormand
- John C. McGinley
- Ed O'Neill
- Bobby Orr
- David Hyde Pierce
- Ving Rhames
- Patricia Richardson
- Laura San Giacomo
- Tony Shalhoub
- John Spencer
- Jimmy Smits
- Clarice Taylor
- Lynne Thigpen
- J. T. Walsh
