= Georgy (musical) =

- Poster for original Broadway production
- Music: George Fischoff
- Lyrics: Carole Bayer
- Book: Tom Mankiewicz; Peter Stone (uncredited)
- Basis: Margaret Forster novel Georgy Girl
- Productions: 1970 Broadway

Georgy is a musical with a book by Tom Mankiewicz, lyrics by Carole Bayer Sager (listed as 'Carole Bayer'), and music by George Fischoff. The story is based on the Margaret Forster novel Georgy Girl and the subsequent 1966 film adaptation,

== Synopsis ==
The show tells the story of awkward, overweight, dowdy music teacher Georgy; her beautiful, self-centered roommate Meredith; Meredith's ne'er-do-well boyfriend Jos; and widower James Leamington, Georgy's father's wealthy employer, who has a lustful eye on the full-figured girl. When Meredith becomes pregnant, an overjoyed Georgy prepares for the blessed event, and soon after finds herself the baby's caregiver when the irresponsible Meredith disappears with a new beau. Georgy and Jos settle into an unlikely relationship threatened by his need to be independent, ultimately forcing Georgy to make a decision based on what's best for the child rather than her own needs and desires.

== Production ==
During tryouts, producer Fred Coe hired Peter Stone to improve the script. The Broadway production was directed by Peter H. Hunt and choreographed by Howard Jeffrey. After seven previews, the show opened on February 26, 1970 at the Winter Garden Theatre, and closed after four performances. The cast included Dilys Watling as Georgy and John Castle as Jos, with Melissa Hart as Meredith and Stephen Elliott as James.

The critical consensus was that the intimate story did not lend itself to a large production with singing ensemble and dance routines, the score included nothing close to matching the film's bouncy title tune, and Watling was neither plain enough nor as vivacious as Lynn Redgrave, who had portrayed Georgy in the film, to do the character justice.

Watling was nominated for the Tony Award for Best Actress in a Musical (competing with Lauren Bacall for Applause and Katharine Hepburn for Coco), and Hart was nominated for Best Featured Actress in a Musical.

== Original cast and characters ==
Character	Broadway (1970)
Georgina "Georgy" Parkin	Dilys Watling
Meredith Montgomery	Melissa Hart
James Leamington	Stephen Elliott
Ted Parkin	Louis Beachner
Jos Jones	John Castle
Peg	Helena Carroll
Peter	Richard Quarry
Health Officer	Cynthia Latham

== Song list ==
Act I

- Howdjadoo - Georgy & Children
- Make It Happen Now - Georgy
- Ol' Pease Puddin' - Jos & Georgy
- Just for the Ride - Meredith and Men
- So What? - Georgy
- Georgy - James
- A Baby / Howdjadoo (Reprise) - Georgy, Meredith, Jos
- That's How It Is - Georgy, James
- There's a Comin' Together - Jos, Georgy, Chorus

Act II

- Something Special - Georgy, Jos
- Half of Me - Georgy
- Gettin' Back to Me - Meredith
- Sweet Memory - Ted, James, Chorus
- Georgy (Reprise) - James
- Life's A Holiday - Jos, Georgy
- Make It Happen Now (Reprise) - Georgy
- There's a Comin' Together (Reprise) - Company

== Awards and nominations ==
=== Original Broadway production ===
Year	Award	Category	Nominee	Result
1970	Tony Award	Best Actress in a Musical	Dilys Watling	Nominated
1970	Tony Award	Best Featured Actress in a Musical	Melissa Hart	Nominated
