= Calculated Risk (film) =

1963 British film by Norman Harrison

- British quad poster
- Directed by: Norman Harrison
- Screenplay by: Edwin Richfield
- Produced by: William McLeod
- Starring: William Lucas; John Rutland; Dilys Watling
- Cinematography: William McLeod
- Edited by: John Trumper
- Music by: George Martin
- Production company: McLeod Productions
- Distributed by: Bryanston Films (UK)
- Release date: 1963 (UK)
- Running time: 72 min
- Country: United Kingdom
- Language: English
- Budget: £19,685

Calculated Risk is a 1963 British crime thriller film directed by Norman Harrison and starring William Lucas, John Rutland and Dilys Watling. The screenplay was by Edwin Richfield.

== Plot ==
Bank robber Kip is released from Wormwood Scrubs Prison on a snowy morning. He goes to visit the grave of his wife who died while he was in prison. Back home he starts to plan a bank robbery based on idea a co-prisoner had told in prison before dying. This involves breaking into a basement bank vault via the cellar of a bombed house and interconnecting old air-raid shelter.

A gang of men is recruited to execute the robbery by Steve, Kip's young brother-in-law, who, because of his planning expertise, has assumed leadership. Steve has planned crimes before, but never participated; but he's compelled to take Kip's place, after Kip collapses because of his weak heart.

The crooks enter the basement of the empty building next to the bank through a trap door, and break through the wall dividing the properties. They are shocked to find a large unexploded bomb from the Second World War.

Repelled by the sight of a squeaking rat, Steve throws a brick at it to frighten it away. The brick hits the bomb's casing. The gang plant explosives in the rear wall of the bank vault. Just after breaking through, Steve hears the bomb ticking, but tells no one. Kip, impatient and alone at home, with no one to control him, arrives to see how the job is progressing. Hearing the ticking bomb, the men flee, but a concrete lintel falls on Steve. One of the gang forewarns his girlfriend living in a nearby house, who calls the police.

Desperate to end his life of poverty, Kip alone stays to retrieve the sacks of money; but his efforts to lift the beam from Steve bring on a fatal heart attack. Just as the injured Steve reaches the trap door, he stumbles on the loose bricks, and falls back down, exhausted. The bomb explodes.

== Cast ==
- William Lucas as Steve
- John Rutland as Kip
- Dilys Watling as Julie
- Shay Gorman as Dodo
- Terence Cooper as Nodge
- David Brierly as Ron
- Warren Mitchell as Simmie
- Vincent Charles as Mr Salting
- Harry Landis as Charlie
- John G. Heller as Police Inspector
- Peter Welch as Police Sergeant
- Brian Cobby as Police Constable

== Critical reception ==
The Monthly Film Bulletin wrote: "Ever since Rififi (1955), the theme of the intricate, detailed planning of a robbery, and its daring execution, has been done to death on every level of production. This second feature uses the same hackneyed idea, but manages to rise above routine through convincing characterisation, deft treatment, good acting, and realistic incidentals."

The Radio Times Guide to Films gave the film 1/5 stars, writing: "The only thing of interest about this tatty little drama is a cameo from Warren Mitchell as a dodgy market trader who sells William Lucas the explosives he needs for his bank job. The story isn't a bad one about a gang that comes across an unexploded Second World War bomb while tunnelling into a vault – but Norman Harrison directs with no sense of suspense."

TV Guide concluded "British crime melodrama has little going for it."
