= Dilys Watling =

British actress (1942–2021)

- Born: Dilys Rhys Jones; 5 May 1942; Fulmer Chase, Buckinghamshire, England
- Died: 10 August 2021 (aged 79)
- Occupation: Actress
- Years active: 1962–1994
- Spouses: Bruce Anderson (m. 1966, divorced); Owen Teale (m. 1986, divorced)
- Children: 1
- Relatives: Deborah Watling (maternal half-sister); Giles Watling (maternal half-brother); Jack Watling (stepfather)

Dilys Rhys Watling (née Jones, 5 May 1942 – 10 August 2021) was an English actress, best known for appearing on British television (Coronation Street, The Benny Hill Show and The Two Ronnies).

== Early life and education ==
Watling was born Dilys Rhys Jones, the daughter of actor Ion Rhys Jones and Patricia Hicks. Ion Rhys Jones was killed in action in World War II, and her mother later married actor Jack Watling. She was educated at St Mary's Convent School in Woodford, Essex, followed by acting school.

== Career ==
Watling acted in repertory theatre and at the Bristol Old Vic. She was nominated for the Tony Award for Best Leading Actress in a Musical for her Broadway debut in the short-lived Georgy in 1970. It proved to be her sole Broadway credit. Other stage credits include the musical Pickwick (1964), an adaptation of Dickens's The Pickwick Papers; the role of the Beggar Woman in the 1980 London cast of Sweeney Todd in the West End; and the West End multi-media Dave Clark rock musical Time (1986).

Watling played Merle Baker on the television soap opera Coronation Street in 1966 and also appeared in the television shows including Benny Hill, The Bill, Feel the Width, Mr Rose, The Two Ronnies. She also made occasional film appearances, including roles in the comedy Two Left Feet (1963); crime film Calculated Risk, (1963); and the horror film Theatre of Death (1967).

== Personal life ==
Watling had four half-siblings through her mother's marriage to actor Jack Watling. These include actress Deborah Watling and politician/actor Giles Watling.

Watling was married twice: her first marriage was to Australian Bruce Anderson in 1966; they later divorced. After a relationship with actor Christopher Matthews, in 1986 she married actor Owen Teale, with whom she had a son, Ion, before divorcing in the mid-1990s.

== Death ==
Watling died on 10 August 2021, aged 79, after a long illness.

== TV credits ==
Year	Title	Role
1962	Compact	Gillian Nesbitt
1965	The Likely Lads; Episode: 'A Star Is Born'	Rhona
1965	United!	Sue Grainger
1966	Theatre 625; Episode: 'Doctor Knock'	Nurse
1966	Pardon the Expression; Episode: 'Night to Remember'	Miss Foster
1966	Coronation Street	Merle Baker (4 episodes)
1967	ITV Play of the Week; Episode: 'Dr De Waldo's Therapy'	Janet
1967	Mr Rose; Episode: 'The Deadly Doll'	Wendy Lee
1967	Twice a Fortnight	Various
1969	Will the Real Mike Yarwood Stand Up?	
1969	The Frankie Howerd Show	Various
1969	Never Mind the Quality, Feel the Width; Episode: 'Arrivederci Roma'	Stewardess
1970	The Other Reg Varney	Various
1971	Sykes: With the Lid Off	
1971	Paul Temple; Episode: 'Game, Set and Match'	Marge
1971	Scott On... Episodes: 'Entertainment'; 'Dress'	
1972–79	The Two Ronnies	Various
1976	The Morecambe & Wise Show	Flossie, A Serving Wench
1975-1977	The Benny Hill Show	
1987	Harry's Kingdom (TV film)	Dawn
1991	The Bill; Episode: 'Getting Involved'	Mrs Goodall
1994	Minder; Episode: 'A Fridge Too Far'	Mrs Kravitz

== Filmography ==
Year	Title	Role
1963	Calculated Risk	Julie
1963	Two Left Feet	Mavis
1967	Theatre of Death	Heidi
