= Final Descent (film) =

- Genre: Disaster
- Written by: Roger Young
- Directed by: Mike Robe
- Starring: Robert Urich; Annette O'Toole; John de Lancie
- Music by: David Benoit
- Countries of origin: United States; Canada
- Original language: English

Production
- Executive producer: Tom Patricia
- Producer: Michael O. Gallant
- Production location: Vancouver
- Cinematography: Alan Caso
- Editor: Sabrina Plisco
- Running time: 92 minutes
- Production companies: Columbia TriStar Television; Mandalay Television

Original release
- Network: CBS
- Release: October 12, 1997

Final Descent is a 1997 American television film, starring Robert Urich and Annette O'Toole. It was written by Roger Young and directed by Mike Robe. The film was originally aired on CBS on October 12, 1997. The sequel Final Run was released on October 10, 1999.

== Plot ==
Quest Airlines pilot Glen “Lucky” Singer prepares to pilot a flight to Dallas, with romantic partner Connie Phipps as co-pilot. They're both concerned that an impending merger may mean layoffs for both of them.

Flying along as flight engineer to check on Lucky's procedures is Quest chief pilot George Bouchard, Connie's former boyfriend. He insists that Lucky fly strictly by the computerized systems, while Lucky prefers to fly by his instincts.

A distracted, inexperienced and arrogant pilot in a light aircraft takes the wrong runway. Immediately after takeoff, his small plane collides with the tail of the airliner and disintegrates in mid-air. The elevators on the airliner are jammed in the up position and trim controls are also damaged, putting the plane into a sustained climb which will eventually put it into thin air and into an unrecoverable spin. The engines must be run at full throttle to avoid stalling and begin to overheat.

Lucky has a conference call with air traffic control, engineers from Gallant – the manufacturer of the aircraft – and Frank O’Hearn, his childhood friend, now a colonel in the Air Force. Lucky suggests shifting weight forward to reduce the climb rate. Gallant's simulations predict the weight shift would be insufficient. During a trip to the lavatory, Lucky has the idea to fill the forward wheel well with water to weigh down the nose. A team of Canadian riggers led by Tim offers to help.

The Army sends an AH-64 helicopter to assess damage. Lucky is inspired to use the 30mm cannon on the helicopter to shoot holes in the elevators to reduce their influence as well as reduce drag which is straining the airframe. Duke, a former attack helicopter pilot confirms it will work; however, when carried out, the gun alone cannot correct the elevator's malfunction.

Lucky suggests his water plan to Frank, who can have a KC-10 refueling tanker filled with water for the mission. To deal with the low temperatures at high altitude, they will attach a bundle of Air Force arctic gear to the flying boom of the tanker. The riggers will have to pull the bundle in through the emergency hatch in the ceiling of the cockpit. Connie will fly the plane in sub-zero temperatures while Lucky will immediately get into arctic gear, then he will take the controls while the riggers remove Connie and get her into the gear. George will hold the refueling hose in the oxygen hold.

Gallant's chief engineer insists there isn't enough emergency oxygen for all of the passengers and recommends sacrificing older and infirm passengers by putting them into the rear cabin and tricking the crew into closing the rear valve to divert all oxygen to the masks in the front cabin. George initially complies then realizes they are being lied to as the valve should not need to be manually opened as Gallant claims.

The scheme goes as planned, although Connie temporarily loses consciousness. The water in the wheel well is insufficient, so George stays in the oxygen hold and tells them to pump more. When he is on the verge of drowning, Lucky pulls him out. The nose begins to drop and Lucky puts the plane into a steep dive to get to a lower altitude so the passengers can breathe. The retracting hose whips through the cockpit and slams into the center console, disabling the instruments. Air traffic control talks Lucky down and they deploy the landing gear in time to release the water. The nose wheel collapses on touchdown, but the plane skids to a stop on the runway without injuries. Lucky and Connie leave the plane to find the passengers waiting on the concourse to applaud them.

Lucky proposes marriage and Connie accepts.

== Cast ==
- Robert Urich as Captain Glen "Lucky" Singer
- Annette O'Toole as Connie Phipps
- John de Lancie as George Bouchard
- Jim Byrnes as Duke Houston
- Ken Pogue as Ian Pryce
- Blu Mankuma as Jack Eberly
- Kevin McNulty as Henry Gibbons
- Stephen E. Miller as Lieutenant Colonel Frank O'Hearn
- Gwynyth Walsh as Patty

== Reception ==
Julio Martinez wrote in Variety: "Final Descent surprises with a few truly original plot situations that make for a more than satisfying outing for stars Robert Urich and Annette O’Toole. Roger Young’s admirably crafted screenplay (based on the Robert P. Davis novel The Glass Cockpit) builds layer upon layer of attention-riveting aeronautical complications, well-served by director Mike Robe (also the co-exec producer), who keeps the action moving at a nerve-rending pace."

== International titles ==
- Aterrissagem de Alto Risco (Brazil)
- Choc en plein ciel (France)
- Aircrash – Katastrophe beim Take Off (Germany)
- Tenkū no Kyōfu – The Final Flight (天空の恐怖 THE FINAL FLIGHT) (Japan)
