= Stranger on My Land =

1988 TV film

- Written by: Edward Hume; I.C. Rapoport
- Directed by: Larry Elikann
- Starring: Tommy Lee Jones; Jeff Allin; Richard Anderson
- Theme music composer: Ron Ramin
- Country of origin: United States
- Original language: English

Production
- Executive producers: Edgar J. Scherick; Gary Hoffman
- Producers: Michael Barnathan; Mitch Engel
- Production location: Park City, Utah
- Cinematography: Laszlo George
- Editor: Peter V. White
- Running time: 94 minutes
- Production companies: Taft Entertainment; Edgar J. Scherick Associates; Republic Pictures (Viacom)

Original release
- Network: ABC
- Release: January 17, 1988

Stranger on My Land is a 1988 Western television film, premiered on American Broadcasting Company, directed by Larry Elikann and is also Joseph Gordon-Levitt's debut role.

== Plot ==
Bud Witman takes part in the forced removal of villagers in Vietnam by detonating their homes that are on land that is declared unsafe because of the war. He is injured while in combat. After surgery he is sent home and returns to Chinook Ranch, a cattle ranch. Some years later the government starts proceedings for a proposed Air Force base extension in the area. Connie Priest, county surveyor, shows animosity toward the Witmans.

Some families have accepted the government's offers for their land, but the Witmans file suit in court to fight the sale. The court rules to enforce eminent domain and the government starts to prepare for the project, although the Witmans will not leave. If the land is not vacated before the ground freezes, the project will be delayed. There is a confrontation with Priest who shoots Vern Whitman. He dies and is interred on the ranch.

Bud's combat buddy shows up to help in his plight. The government intends to use deputized locals when they show up in force with a moving van to remove Bud. The public road leading to the ranch is crowded with spectators. Explosives are detonated by Bud when the first unsuccessful assault is made on the property. Priest volunteers to remove Bud from the property on his own terms that have not been disclosed to the operation's commanding military officer on site. Priest and his cohorts riddle the house with bullets and will not cease when commanded by the U.S. Marshall.

Bud and his small force exit the house before it is set ablaze. They take new positions and disable the Priest force except for Priest. Bud lures Priest into the wilds. Bud is shot but not incapacitated. Fisticuffs are used to disable Priest and Bud attempts to drown him; an appeal by Annie Witman makes Bud relent. Priest retrieves from the stream his gun and is about to fire on Bud when the Marshall shoots and kills Priest.

When Bud returns to the ranch the spectators flock to greet him. The judge that confirmed the order of eminent domain arrives at the ranch and notifies the commanding officer on site to back down as he intends to review the order the following day.

== Cast ==
- Tommy Lee Jones as Bud Whitman (Vern's son)
- Jeff Allin as Marine Captain
- Richard Anderson as Maj. Walters
- Michael Paul Chan as Eliot (Bud's combat buddy)
- Joseph Gordon-Levitt as Rounder Whitman (Bud's son)
- Dee Wallace as Annie Whitman (Bud's wife)
- Barry Corbin as Gil (US Marshall)
- Terry O'Quinn as Connie Priest (County Surveyor)
- Pat Hingle as Judge Munson (Whitman family attorney)
- Michael Flynn as Brewer
- Ben Johnson as Vern Whitman (Bud's father)

== Production ==
Parts of the film were shot in Salt Lake City and Kamas, Utah.
