= List of Spenser: For Hire episodes =

Spenser: For Hire lasted for three seasons (1985–1988) and was followed by four made-for-TV movies (1993–1995), all starring Robert Urich and Avery Brooks.

== Series overview ==
Season	Episodes	Originally released	
Season	Episodes	First released	Last released
1	23	September 20, 1985	April 8, 1986
2	22	September 27, 1986	May 9, 1987
3	21	September 27, 1987	May 7, 1988

== Episodes ==
=== Season 1 (1985–86) ===
The two-hour pilot movie was an adaptation of the fourth novel in the book series, Promised Land.

No. overall	No. in season	Title	Directed by	Written by	Original release date
1	1	"Promised Land"	Lee H. Katzin	John Wilder	September 20, 1985
2	2	"Promised Land"	Lee H. Katzin	John Wilder	September 20, 1985
Spenser is hired to find the runaway wife of a wealthy businessman (Geoffrey Lewis).
3	3	"No Room at the Inn"	John Wilder	John Wilder	September 27, 1985
Spenser is hired by the police department to protect a witness who may not be who she claims.
4	4	"The Choice"	Richard Colla	Daniel Freudenberger	October 4, 1985
A pair of young thrill-killers target Spenser, accidentally shooting a bystander.
5	5	"Children of a Tempest Storm"	William Wiard	Robert Hamilton	October 11, 1985
Spenser kills a would-be thief in the course of thwarting a robbery.
6	6	"Original Sin"	Harvey Hart	Robert Hamilton	October 18, 1985
Spenser investigates the apparent suicide of a young nun, and stumbles onto a corrupt landlord.
7	7	"Discord in A Minor"	Harvey Hart	Story by : David Abramowitz; Teleplay by : Janet Kapsin	October 25, 1985
Spenser is fired from a bodyguard job after his young charge is kidnapped.
8	8	"The Killer Within"	Don Chaffey	Robert Malcolm Young	November 12, 1985
Spenser is hired to protect a woman's identical twin sister from assassins.
9	9	"Autumn Thieves"	William Wiard	Jerry Ziegman	November 19, 1985
Spenser stumbles onto a ring of thieves while investigating a relic stolen from a museum.
10	10	"Blood Money"	Virgil Vogel	Story by : Bob Shayne; Teleplay by : Bob Shayne & Bruce Murkoff	November 26, 1985
The wife of a kidnapped oil tycoon hires Spenser to deliver $1 million in ransom money.
11	11	"Resurrection"	Virgil Vogel	Richard Collins	December 3, 1985
Spenser investigates a crooked vice cop involved in the mugging of one of Susan's friends.
12	12	"Internal Affairs"	Richard Colla	Bruce Murkoff	December 17, 1985
Marital infidelity and suspected involvement in a gambling ring lead to Lt. Quirk's suspension.
13	13	"Death by Design"	Virgil Vogel	Bruce Murkoff	January 7, 1986
Spenser walks into a death trap when a beautiful university scientist hires him to track down her gigolo boyfriend.
14	14	"A Day's Wages"	Virgil Vogel	Robert McKee	January 14, 1986
Spenser and Hawk blame themselves for failing to protect their respective clients from the clutches of the underworld.
15	15	"A Madness Most Discreet"	Ray Austin	Robert Hamilton	January 21, 1986
Spenser is dazzled by the beauty and grace of a former Bolshoi ballerina who appeals for his help and tempts him with her love.
16	16	"Brother to Dragons"	Sutton Roley	Howard Gordon & Alex Gansa	February 4, 1986
Spenser goes undercover at a private high school to investigate heroin use on campus, but discovers something far more serious.
17	17	"When Silence Speaks"	Ray Austin	Robert Hamilton	February 11, 1986
Spenser is retained to locate a missing scientist by a deaf newspaper columnist (Phyllis Frelich) with whom the scientist had been corresponding.
18	18	"In a Safe Place"	Virgil Vogel	William Robert Yates	February 18, 1986
Spenser and Susan look for a Mexican labor organizer who has suspiciously disappeared.
19	19	"Angel of Desolation"	Ray Austin	Robert Hamilton	March 4, 1986
While working for a wealthy woman, Spenser is caught up in a deadly murder mystery complete with an illicit love story.
20	20	"She Loves Me, She Loves Me Not"	Virgil Vogel	Daniel Freudenberger	March 11, 1986
Sgt. Frank falls in love with a white supremacist.
21	21	"At the River's Edge"	David Whorf	Robert Hamilton	March 25, 1986
Spenser is hired by a 12-year-old to investigate the murder of her older sister.
22	22	"Rage"	Virgil Vogel	Bruce Murcoff	April 1, 1986
A teenage girl's agitated condition following a rape gets her into deeper trouble when she's kidnapped by an ex-con bent on shooting Spenser.
23	23	"Hell Hath No Fury"	Virgil Vogel	Daniel Freudenberger	April 8, 1986
The father of a boy killed in the collapse of an apartment takes a politician hostage to protest lax inspection charges.

=== Season 2 (1986–87) ===
No. overall	No. in season	Title	Directed by	Written by	Original release date
24	1	"An Eye for an Eye"	William Wiard	Stephen Hattman	September 27, 1986
New D.A. Rita Fiore tries to prosecute Spenser for blackmail.
25	2	"Widow's Walk"	William Wiard	Story by : Joe Smoke; Teleplay by : Juanita Bartlett	October 4, 1986
A small fishing family hires Spenser to investigate the death of their father.
26	3	"White Knight"	Virgil Vogel	Daniel Freudenberger	October 18, 1986
While Spenser and Hawk are in a small town to view a boxing match, Hawk is arrested.
27	4	"Rockabye Baby"	Virgil Vogel	David Abramowitz	October 25, 1986
A mobster's pregnant teenage girlfriend tries to keep her unborn son from his father.
28	5	"And Give Up Show Biz?"	William Wiard	Robert Bielak	November 1, 1986
Spenser protects a man suffering from amnesia.
29	6	"The Long Hunt"	Virgil Vogel	David Carren	November 8, 1986
A young criminal's father attacks a bus transporting convicts to the state prison.
30	7	"Home Is the Hero"	William Wiard	Shel Willens	November 22, 1986
Rita hires Spenser to investigate a troubled teenager.
31	8	"One if by Land, Two if by Sea"	Virgil Vogel	William Robert Yates	November 29, 1986
A friend of Spenser's is shot and killed while portraying Paul Revere during a Revolutionary War re-enactment.
32	9	"Shadowsight"	Cliff Bole	Gerry Day	December 13, 1986
A girl who apparently has the unique ability to 'see' through both space and time, enlists Spenser's help to solve a rash of arsons.
33	10	"The Hopes and Fears"	Harry Harris	Michael Petryni	December 20, 1986
With the help of Hawk, a disgusted Spenser is determined to get rid of thugs who are terrorizing his Boston neighborhood.
34	11	"Among Friends"	Cliff Bole	Daniel Freudenberger	January 10, 1987
Hawk is the main suspect when Lt. Quirk is shot, due to a recent fracas between the two.
35	12	"I Confess"	Winrich Kolbe	Story by : Rudolph Berecht; Teleplay by : Robert Malcolm Young	January 17, 1987
A wealthy man is murdered and, surprise, an innocent man is arrested.
36	13	"Murder and Acquisitions"	Harry Harris	Alex Gansa & Howard Gordon	January 24, 1987
Spenser investigates the apparent suicide of a philandering financier about to turn state's evidence to bring down insider trading.
37	14	"Personal Demons"	Cliff Bole	Cynthia Darnell	February 7, 1987
Spenser and Rita go after a corrupt ruler.
38	15	"Mary Hamilton"	Winrich Kolbe	Story by : Norma Safford Vela; Teleplay by : David Carren	February 14, 1987
A girl (Melissa Leo) comes to Boston looking for her estranged father. Spenser decides to help her.
39	16	"Trial and Error"	David Whorf	Story by : Nelson Costello; Teleplay by : Robert Bielak & Nelson Costello	February 21, 1987
A pimp is wrongfully arrested for the murder of one of his girls. Spenser agonizes between pursuing the real murderer or letting the pimp take the rap.
40	17	"One for My Daughter"	Winrich Kolbe	Story by : Joan H. Parker; Teleplay by : Robert B. Parker	March 7, 1987
Spenser and Hawk protect a man (Larry Riley) who owes money to men of dubious ethics.
41	18	"My Brother's Keeper"	Michael Vejar	Alex Gansa & Howard Gordon	March 14, 1987
Spenser becomes embroiled in the seamy Vietnamese organized crime racket after a Vietnamese crime boss uses Spenser to track down a former soldier.
42	19	"The Road Back"	Winrich Kolbe	Stephen Hattman	March 21, 1987
Spenser loses all feeling in his right arm after he's shot while guarding a politician.
43	20	"If You Knew Sammy"	Bruce Bilson	Lee Goldberg & William Rabkin	April 4, 1987
NRA poster-boy Sammy Backlin (Sal Viscuso) breezes into town for a book signing, unwittingly involving Spenser in a shoot out.
44	21	"The Man Who Wasn't There"	Charles Picerni	Michael Petryni	May 2, 1987
Rita and her old college friends are reunited when a fictional person they created 20 years ago is found dead in his apartment.
45	22	"The Song of Orpheus"	Winrich Kolbe	Daniel Freudenberger	May 9, 1987
A prison inmate with a grudge against Hawk hires outside muscle to rub him out. Last episode to feature Carolyn McCormick as Rita Fiori.

=== Season 3 (1987–88) ===
No. overall	No. in season	Title	Directed by	Written by	Original release date
46	1	"Homecoming"	Winrich Kolbe	Story by : Joan H. Parker; Teleplay by : Robert B. Parker	September 27, 1987
Spenser tries to settle a feud between a mobster (William Hickey) and a judge. Susan returns from California.
47	2	"My Enemy, My Friend"	Virgil W. Vogel	Alex Gansa & Howard Gordon	October 4, 1987
A streetwise young kid (Kadeem Hardison) gets involved over his head in the underworld.
48	3	"Heart of the Matter"	Winrich Kolbe	Norma Safford Vela	October 11, 1987
Lt. Quirk faces his mortality when he suffers a heart attack. This is the last episode to feature Richard Jaeckel as Marty Quirk.
49	4	"On the Night He Was Betrayed"	David M. Whorf	Michael Fisher	November 1, 1987
Spenser helps an old friend, an alcoholic priest (James Rebhorn) who tries to help homeless teenagers, when he gets involved over his head.
50	5	"Sleepless Dream"	David M. Whorf	William Rabkin & Lee Goldberg	November 8, 1987
Spenser becomes obsessed with an apparently suicidal woman after a chance encounter on the street.
51	6	"Consilium Abditum"	Winrich Kolbe	Stephen Hattman	November 15, 1987
Spenser is arrested when he intervenes in a fight.
52	7	"Thanksgiving"	Richard Colla	Walter Brough	November 29, 1987
Spenser runs into an old friend while visiting a recreation of a Puritan village.
53	8	"Gone Fishin'"	Bruce Bilson	Tom Chehak	December 6, 1987
Spenser's fishing trip is interrupted when he has to protect a young man who's not allowed to marry the girl he loves.
54	9	"Child's Play"	Richard Colla	William Robert Yates	December 20, 1987
A sniper takes some shots at Spenser and Susan, and a young boy ends up dead in the crossfire.
55	10	"Skeletons in the Closet"	Winrich Kolbe	Don Nardo & Peter Jones & Robert B. Verduccio	January 3, 1988
Spenser and Hawk find themselves on opposite sides of the same case.
56	11	"The Siege"	Bill Duke	Andrew Sipes	January 10, 1988
Susan and an injured Hawk are trapped inside a post office when a disgruntled postal worker takes hostages.
57	12	"Arthur's Wake"	Winrich Kolbe	Jerome Coopersmith	January 16, 1988
Spenser protects an old friend, Arthur, after he's assaulted and robbed.
58	13	"To the End of the Line"	Harry Harris	Nelson Costello	January 23, 1988
When Frank's niece (Cady McClain) dies of a drug overdose, Spenser and Frank go after the men responsible.
59	14	"Play It Again, Sammy"	Bruce Bilson	Lee Goldberg & William Rabkin	January 30, 1988
Sammy Backlin calls Spenser for protection when he's being hunted by a 'vicious horde of bloodthirsty assassins'.
60	15	"The Big Fight"	Winrich Kolbe	Jonathan Day	February 6, 1988
One of Spenser's old trainers (Cliff Gorman) lures Spenser to a deserted warehouse where Spenser is supposed to be killed, to get out from under a gambling debt.
61	16	"Substantial Justice"	David M. Whorf	John Jay Osborn Jr.	February 13, 1988
Spenser protects a theater owner from gangsters, but begins to suspect she's not as innocent as she appears.
62	17	"Company Man"	Winrich Kolbe	Norma Safford Vela	March 12, 1988
Spenser suspects insurance fraud when a building blows up. Susan has a possibly cancerous mass removed.
63	18	"Watercolors"	Winrich Kolbe	Ronald D. Brown	March 19, 1988
Spenser protects a child artist after the child witnesses a mob execution while painting in the forest.
64	19	"Hawk's Eyes"	David M. Whorf	Tom Chehak	March 26, 1988
Spenser investigates the death of a friend apparently involved with white supremacists. Hawk is rendered blind by an explosion.
65	20	"McAllister"	Harvey Hart	William Robert Yates & Steven Hattman	April 30, 1988
Spenser assists a lawyer in proving the innocence of his client, a Navy seaman accused of murdering the captain's daughter.
66	21	"Haunting"	David M. Whorf	Michael Fisher	May 7, 1988
Spenser investigates an old child kidnapping case when he tries to track down a teenage girl's biological parents.

== TV movies ==
During the early 1990s, Urich and Brooks reunited for four made-for-TV films, produced by the Lifetime cable network. The movies were based on four of Parker's novels. Parker and his wife Joan co-wrote the first two screenplays and the two movies kept to the spirit of the series. To keep production costs down Barbara Stock was replaced as Susan Silverman in the first two movies by Barbara Williams and in the other two by veteran actress Wendy Crewson (Air Force One) and Frank Belson was played by J. Winston Carroll. Parker's son Daniel appears in all four movies as a waiter in Spenser's favorite restaurant. Unlike the series which was filmed in Boston, the new movies were filmed in Toronto to take advantage of the lower production costs. The first two movies were still set in Boston (parts of Toronto easily passed for Boston), with the second two rewritten to be set in Toronto (the novel A Savage Place was set in Los Angeles).

Title	Directed by	Written by	Original release date
"Spenser: Ceremony"	Paul Lynch, Andrew Wild	Robert B. Parker & Joan H. Parker	July 22, 1993
Spenser is hired to locate April Kyle, the missing daughter of Harry Kyle, millionaire and potential candidate for Governor. (In the novel, Kyle is an obnoxious insurance salesman; its concluding tie-in to the earlier novel Mortal Stakes is replaced by an allusion to a rehabilitation center.)
"Pale Kings and Princes"	Vic Sarin	Robert B. Parker & Joan H. Parker	February 2, 1994
One of Susan's former patients, a news reporter, is killed, Spenser investigates.
"Spenser: The Judas Goat"	Joseph L. Scanlan	Nahum Tate, Carol Daley, Monte Stettin	December 1, 1994
Spenser is hired by Hugh Dixon to track down the killers of his wife and daughters.
"Spenser: A Savage Place"	Joseph L. Scanlan	Nahum Tate, Carol Daley, Donald Martin	January 4, 1995
Candy Sloane, a news reporter that Spenser used to date, hires him as backup while she investigates a credit card fraud ring.
