= Amber moon =

Spicy whiskey cocktail

- Type: Cocktail
- Ingredients: 3 US fluid ounces (89 ml) whiskey or vodka; 1 raw egg; Tabasco sauce, to taste
- Standard drinkware: Highball glass
- Served: Straight up: chilled, without ice
- Preparation: Crack an egg into a tall glass, leaving the yolk unbroken. Pour in whiskey or vodka. Add Tabasco to taste, or serve on the side.

An amber moon is a cocktail containing Tabasco sauce, a raw egg, and whiskey or vodka. It is typically considered a "hair of the dog" hangover remedy (an alcoholic drink consumed for the purpose of relieving a hangover), though there is no scientific evidence showing that drinking alcohol is effective as a treatment for a hangover. It is similar to a prairie oyster, another traditional hangover remedy drink made with a raw egg, though a prairie oyster does not typically contain alcohol.

The amber moon is featured in the 1974 mystery film Murder on the Orient Express, based on the 1934 novel by Agatha Christie. In the film, the butler Mr. Edward Beddoes, played by John Gielgud, brings this drink in the morning to his employer, Mr. Samuel Ratchett. Beddoes knocks on the door of the dead man's train compartment and announces, "It's me sir, Beddoes, with your pick-me-up. Your Amber Moon, Mr. Ratchett." Beddoes is later questioned about the death of Ratchett by the detective Hercule Poirot and relates, "His breakfast was his Amber Moon. He never rose until it had had its full effect." The amber moon in the film was prepared with vodka instead of whisky.

== See also ==
- List of cocktails
