= Delirious (1991 film) =

1991 American romantic comedy film directed by Tom Mankiewicz

- Theatrical release poster
- Directed by: Tom Mankiewicz
- Written by: Lawrence J. Cohen; Fred Freeman
- Produced by: Lawrence J. Cohen; Fred Freeman; Doug Claybourne
- Starring: John Candy; Mariel Hemingway; Emma Samms; Raymond Burr; David Rasche; Dylan Baker; Charles Rocket
- Cinematography: Robert Stevens
- Edited by: William D. Gordean; Tina Hirsch
- Music by: Cliff Eidelman
- Distributed by: Metro-Goldwyn-Mayer
- Release date: August 9, 1991
- Running time: 96 minutes
- Country: United States
- Language: English
- Budget: $18 million
- Box office: $5.5 million

Delirious is a 1991 American fantasy comedy film directed by Tom Mankiewicz and written by Lawrence J. Cohen and Fred Freeman. It stars John Candy, Mariel Hemingway, Emma Samms, Raymond Burr, David Rasche, Dylan Baker, and Charles Rocket. Candy plays Jack Gable, the head writer of a television soap opera who, after suffering a head injury, awakens in the fictional town in which his series is set and discovers that whatever he writes on his typewriter becomes reality.

Principal photography began in March 1990 and concluded in early June, with filming taking place in New York City, Los Angeles, and several locations throughout Southern California. Originally scheduled for release in December 1990, Delirious was repeatedly postponed following the merger of Pathé Communications and MGM/UA and subsequent financial difficulties at MGM. Its release was eventually delayed until August 1991.

Released on August 9, 1991, Delirious was a critical and commercial failure, grossing $5.5 million in the United States and Canada against an $18 million budget. Reviews were generally negative, particularly towards the plot, although Candy's performance received some praise.

== Plot ==
Jack Gable is the lead writer and producer of the soap opera Beyond Our Dreams. He harbors an unrequited love for Laura Claybourne, the narcissistic actress who plays Rachel Hedison, and clashes with co-producers Lou and Arlene Sherwood over their plans to kill off Rachel because of Laura's contract demands and to force other changes to the show. The Sherwoods feign compromise while secretly hiring Jack's rival, Arnie Fetterman, to rewrite his scripts. Jack repeatedly encounters Louise, an aspiring actress auditioning for the role of Janet DuBois.

Preparing to spend the weekend in Vermont, Jack agrees to take Laura with him after she breaks up with Dennis, who plays her lover, Dr. Paul Kirkwood. Dennis arrives and reconciles with her, however, and a frustrated Jack hits his head on the car trunk before later being involved in a head-on collision.

Jack awakens in the Community Hospital of Ashford Falls, the fictional setting of his show. He initially believes he is being pranked, but soon discovers that the entire town is real. Outside, Janet mistakes him for Jack Gates, a wealthy and ruthless new character Jack created, and believes he has come to buy her deceased father's miracle weight-loss formula. When Jack insists he is a writer and wants to leave, Janet sarcastically tells him to "write his way out". Inspired, Jack retrieves his typewriter and writes that the town mechanic calls to say his car is repaired. Moments later, the call occurs. He realizes he can control Ashford Falls through his writing.

Assuming Gates's identity, Jack uses his power to pursue Rachel. He saves her from a death Fetterman has scripted and writes himself increasingly impressive feats to win her affection, angering Kirkwood. Meanwhile, Rachel's family, the Hedisons—patriarch Carter and his sons Blake and Ty—seek Janet's formula for their pharmaceutical company. Fetterman's version of Jack Gates appears and confronts Jack before being shot dead by the Hedisons. Jack writes Gates back to life and sends him on an urgent trip to Cleveland. Jack also grows closer to Janet, coming to appreciate her kindness and genuine affection. As the Hedisons become increasingly dangerous, he writes Janet out of town to Africa for her safety, but she later receives a telegram summoning her home.

Rachel and her family lure Jack to a party at their mansion to obtain the formula. Drunk, Jack writes himself as a brilliant pianist and heroically saves a choking guest, but several typos produce absurd results, including deer arriving instead of beer. Frustrated, he breaks the typewriter. Impressed by him, Rachel decides they should run away together.

Janet soon returns. Nurse Helen Caldwell reveals that she sent the telegram as revenge against Rachel for stealing Kirkwood, and exposes that Janet and Rachel were switched at birth, meaning Rachel is not truly a Hedison. Janet immediately embraces the family's scheming behavior, which Jack realizes is the result of Fetterman's writing, and urges her to remain herself. Blake then tries to kill Rachel after she secretly poisoned him to remove him from the family business, but accidentally shoots Janet instead. Janet is rushed to the hospital, where Rachel persuades Kirkwood to let her die during surgery. Realizing that Rachel is cruel and that he truly loves Janet, Jack desperately repairs his typewriter and begins writing a safer ending for her. Gates suddenly returns, furious at being sent to Cleveland, and shoots Jack and the typewriter.

Jack awakens back on the show's set. He confronts Laura about her behavior and fires her, then challenges the Sherwoods. When Arlene begins choking on a sandwich, Jack agrees to save her only if they allow him creative control.

At a diner, Jack recognizes Louise after she orders the same unusual sandwich that Janet favored. The two leave together. Some time later, they are in a relationship, and Jack has cast Louise as Janet. He says he tried using the typewriter one final time and believes it worked, as Laura is now turning letters on a game show in Cleveland.

== Cast ==
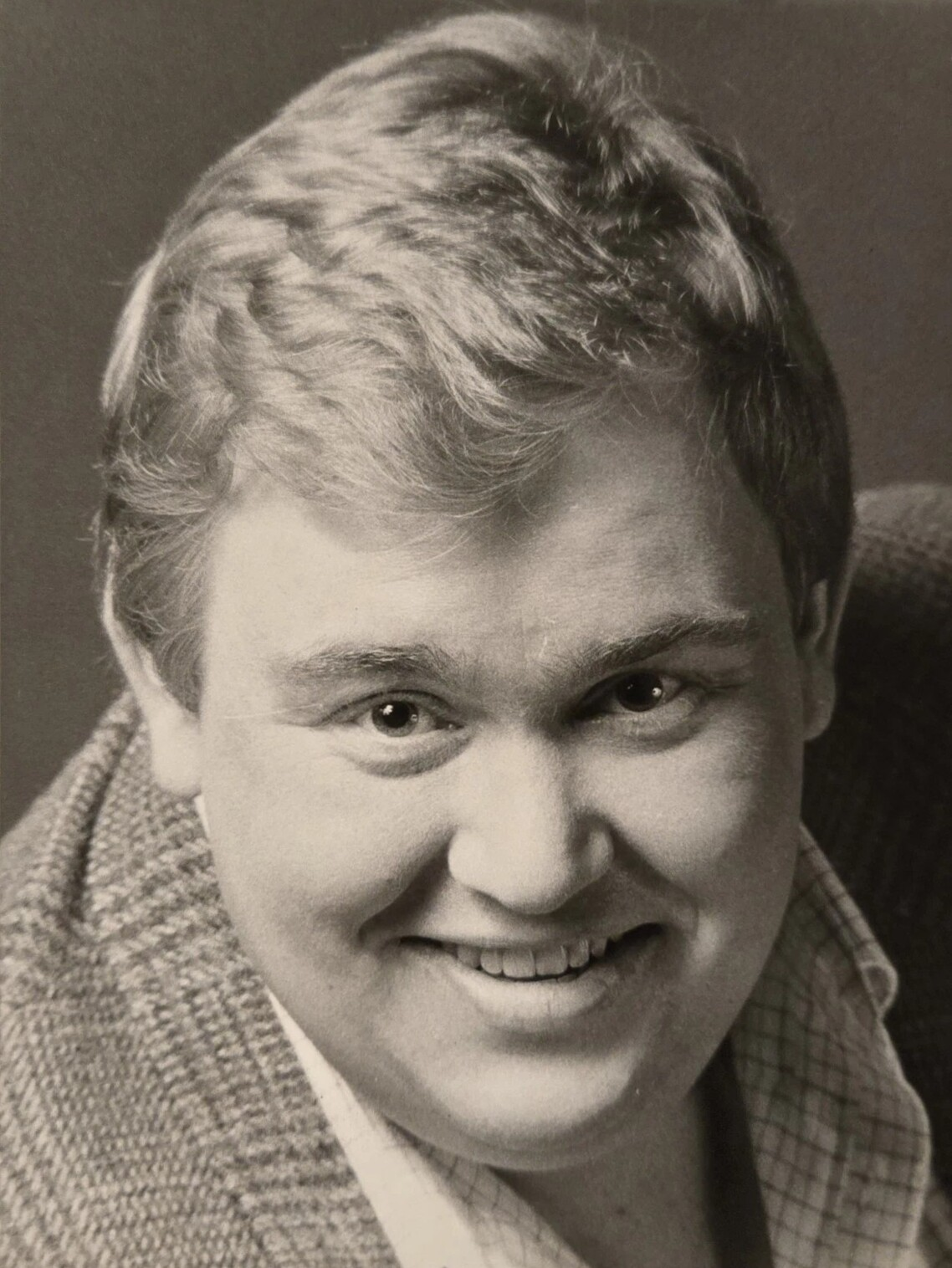
John Candy (pictured in 1982), Mariel Hemingway (date unknown), and Emma Samms (1990)
- John Candy as Jack Gable
- Mariel Hemingway as Janet DuBois / Louise
- Emma Samms as Rachel Hedison / Laura Claybourne
- David Rasche as Dr. Paul Kirkwood / Dennis
- Charles Rocket as Ty Hedison
- Dylan Baker as Blake Hedison
- Jerry Orbach as Lou Sherwood
- Renee Taylor as Arlene Sherwood
- Raymond Burr as Carter Hedison

Delirious also features Andrea Thompson as Nurse Helen Caldwell / Lee, Zach Grenier as Mickey, Marvin Kaplan as Typewriter Repairman, Milt Oberman as Arnie Fetterman, and Mark Boone Junior as Cable Man.

Robert Wagner appears in a cameo appearance as Jack Gates, alongside Margot Kidder as Woman in restroom.

== Production ==
Principal photography began in New York City in March 14, 1990, and concluded in early June, with filming also taking place in Los Angeles and Southern California.

Filming took place at two luxury estates in Montecito, California, near Santa Barbara, while additional exterior scenes were shot at a Pasadena residence previously used as Wayne Manor in the 1960s television series Batman. Other locations included Griffith Park, Elysian Park, Angeles Crest Highway, Malibu State Park, Greer Ranch in Murrieta, Golden Oak Ranch (owned by The Walt Disney Company, and Brookfield Farms in Thousand Oaks.

== Release and reception ==
Delirious was scheduled for release in December 1990. However, the November 1990 merger of Pathé Communications and MGM/UA led to delays, and it was subsequently moved to March 1991. It was postponed again due to MGM's financial difficulties and reported problems securing approximately $7 million for prints and advertising, eventually rescheduling the film to August.

=== Box office ===
Delirious was released in the United States and Canada on August 9, 1991. During its opening weekend, it grossed $1.804 million from 1,142 theaters—an average of $1,578 per theater—making it the thirteenth-highest-grossing film of the weekend, ahead of Bill & Ted's Bogus Journey ($1.4 million), in its fourth weekend, and behind City Slickers ($1.809 million), in its tenth. In its second weekend, Delirious fell to the number eighteen position with a gross of $896,195, ahead of The Commitments ($271,333), in its first weekend, and behind The Naked Gun 2½: The Smell of Fear ($1 million), in its eighth. The film left the top twenty highest-grossing films by its third weekend.

Delirious was the one-hundred and thirty-second highest-grossing film of 1991 in the United States and Canada, with a total gross of only $5.5 million against its $18 million budget, ahead of Livin' Large! ($5.4 million), and behind Barton Fink ($6.2 million). Figures are unavailable for its performance outside of the United States and Canada.

=== Critical response ===
Delirious was released to generally negative reviews, with The Hollywood Reporter criticizing the film's reliance on stereotypical characters and an overly busy plot, while the Los Angeles Times dismissed it as a poor film.

On Rotten Tomatoes, the film has an approval rating of 27% based on 22 reviews, with an average rating of 5.1/10. The website's critics consensus reads: "Delirious benefits from John Candy's sweet screen presence, but it's nowhere near enough to compensate for a woefully unfunny script." Audiences surveyed by CinemaScore gave the film a grade "C+" on scale of A to F.
