= Robert Urich =

American actor and producer (1946–2002)

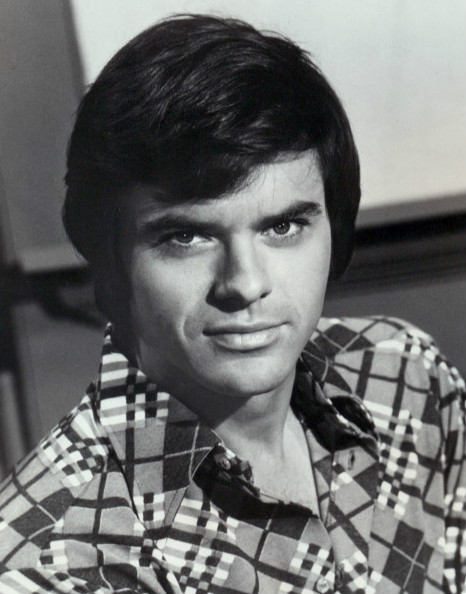
- Urich in 1973
- Born: Robert Michael Urich; December 19, 1946; Toronto, Ohio, U.S.
- Died: April 16, 2002 (aged 55); Thousand Oaks, California, U.S.
- Resting place: Prince Edward County, Ontario, Canada
- Other name: Robert York
- Education: Florida State University; Michigan State University
- Occupations: Actor; producer
- Years active: 1972–2002
- Spouses: Barbara Rucker (m. 1968; div. 1974); Heather Menzies (m. 1975)
- Children: 3

Robert Michael Urich (December 19, 1946 – April 16, 2002) was an American film, television, and stage actor and television producer. Over the course of his 30-year career, he starred in a record 15 television series.

Urich began his career in television in the early 1970s. After guest stints and roles in short-lived television series, he won a co-starring role in the action/crime drama series S.W.A.T. in 1975. In 1978, he landed the lead role of Dan Tanna in the crime drama series Vega$, which aired on ABC from 1978 to June 1981 and earned him two Golden Globe Award nominations. In addition to his work in television, Urich also co starred in several feature films, including Magnum Force (1973), The Ice Pirates (1984) and Turk 182 (1985). From 1985 to 1988, he portrayed the title role in the detective television series Spenser: For Hire, based on Robert B. Parker's series of mystery novels. In 1988, he began hosting the documentary series National Geographic Explorer. He won a CableACE Award for his work on the series. He was also awarded a Golden Boot Award for his work in Western television series and films.

In 1993, he won an Emmy for narrating a nature documentary. He revealed on The Late Show with David Letterman that he never knew about his nomination and win. It was sent by FedEx to his home.

In 1996, Urich starred in the television series The Lazarus Man. It was canceled shortly after he announced that he had been diagnosed with synovial sarcoma, a rare cancer, in July that year. He sought treatment for his illness while continuing his career and also worked to raise money for cancer research. He was declared cancer free in 1998 and returned to television in the UPN series Love Boat: The Next Wave. In 2000, he made his Broadway debut as Billy Flynn in the musical Chicago. His last role was in the NBC sitcom Emeril in 2001, but in the autumn of that year his cancer returned and he died in April 2002 at age 55.

== Early life ==
Urich was born and raised in Toronto, Ohio, the son of John Paul and Cecilia Monica (née Halpate) Urich. He was of Rusyn (Ukrainian) and Slovak extraction and raised Byzantine Catholic. His elder brother was actor Tom Urich (1935-2022). An excellent high school athlete, Urich attended Florida State University on a football scholarship. He played backup center during the 1965–66 football season, receiving only minimal playing time, and was a member of the Lambda Chi Alpha fraternity. In 1968, he earned a bachelor's degree in Radio and Television Communications. He went on to Michigan State University and earned a master's degree in Broadcast Research and Management. He took voice lessons at the University of Chicago music school.

Urich explained in a 1997 interview with Tom Snyder that he worked in sales in Chicago at WGN-TV for $150 a week and was fired after they discovered he was moonlighting. Urich had also worked briefly as a weatherman.

== Career ==
After appearing in a Chicago production of The Rainmaker with Burt Reynolds, Urich decided to pursue acting full-time after Reynolds encouraged him to move to Los Angeles and do more acting.

=== 1970s–1980s ===
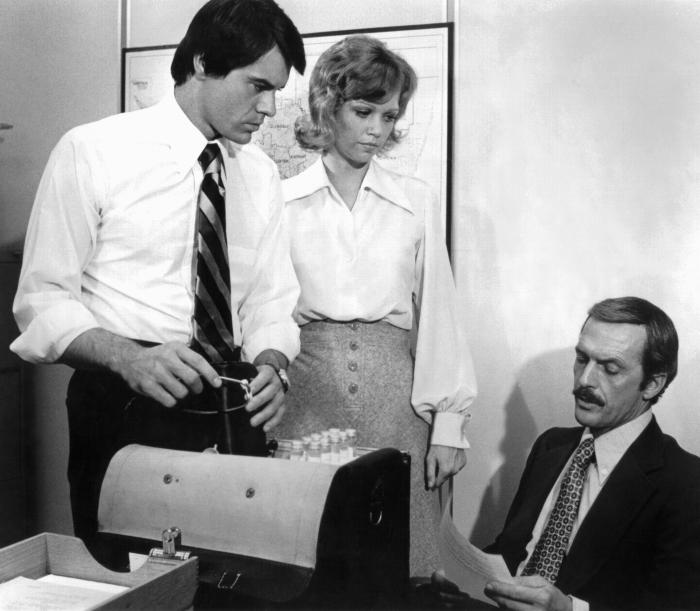
Urich, Maureen Reagan, and Jack Hogan pose for a publicity photo for the TV series The Specialists, 1974

Urich made his television debut in a guest starring role in The F.B.I., in 1972. The following year, he won a lead role in Bob & Carol & Ted & Alice. It was a television adaptation of the 1969 film of the same title. It struggled in the ratings and was canceled after six episodes. He made his film debut later that same year opposite Clint Eastwood in the Dirty Harry film Magnum Force playing a vigilante motorcycle-patrol police officer. In 1975, Urich was cast in the action/crime drama series S.W.A.T.. According to the executive producer Aaron Spelling, Burt Reynolds convinced Spelling to allow Urich to read for the part. Spelling was impressed with his reading and cast him in the role of "Officer Jim Street". A mid-season replacement, it earned high enough ratings to warrant a second season. However, it was canceled in 1976 due to its violent content.

Urich's next role was on the sitcom Soap as Peter the Tennis Player in 1977. That same year he was cast as Paul Thurston, a handsome, ego-driven talk show host in the Bewitched spin-off series Tabitha, starring Lisa Hartman. Its ratings were initially strong, but schedule changes caused ratings to drop, and the show was canceled in 1978 after 13 episodes. Shortly after, he was cast in another Aaron Spelling produced series, called Vega$. Urich portrayed the series' lead character, Dan Tanna, a private detective who solves various crimes in Las Vegas. Vega$ was a hit for ABC and he received two Golden Globe Award nominations for his work on it. By the third season, ratings had started to decline, and with little network support, Vega$ was canceled at the end of the third season in June, 1981. Shortly after, Urich signed with Metro-Goldwyn-Mayer (MGM) and focused on film roles. His first film for MGM was Endangered Species (1982), a science fiction film directed by Alan Rudolph.

After filming Endangered Species, Urich returned to television and starred in Gavilan. He played the title character who was a former CIA agent turned oceanographer. The series, however, was canceled after seven episodes. In 1984, he starred in two more films The Ice Pirates, and Wes Craven's Invitation to Hell. In 1985, Urich co-starred in the film Turk 182, although it was not a commercial success. In 1985, Urich returned to episodic television as the title character in Spenser: For Hire. It was a hit and aired for three seasons. He also reprised the role in several television films after it was canceled: Spenser: Ceremony (1993), Spenser: Pale Kings and Princes (1994), Spenser: The Judas Goat (1994), and Spenser: A Savage Place (1995). In 1988, he hosted the documentary series National Geographic Explorer. He won a CableACE Award for his work on the series. In 1989, he portrayed Jake Spoon in the acclaimed television miniseries Lonesome Dove, a role for which he received many positive reviews.

=== 1990s–2000s ===
In the 1990s, Urich mainly appeared in television films and several short-lived television series. From 1990 to 1991, he starred in the sitcom American Dreamer and the TV movie 83 Hours 'Til Dawn. The following year, he starred in Crossroads, a drama series that aired on ABC for ten episodes. In 1993, he and Faye Dunaway starred in the sitcom It Had to Be You. It was critically panned and canceled after four episodes. In 1995, he narrated an extremely rare one-night showing of a Disney television documentary called Alien Encounters: From New Tomorrowland. It has never been shown again. In 1996, he starred in the TNT western series The Lazarus Man. It earned strong enough ratings to be picked up for a second season but shortly after it was renewed, he announced he had been diagnosed with synovial sarcoma. Its production company, Castle Rock Entertainment, opted to cancel it due to that. In 1999, he commented on their choice to do so, "There's really a law against what they did. They found out I had cancer, and they just canceled the show. They didn't ask the doctors if I could work. They didn't ask if I could go back to work." In 2000, he sued them for breach of contract. The lawsuit was later settled with both parties agreeing not to publicly disclose the terms. While undergoing cancer treatments, Urich hosted the medical documentary series Vital Signs in 1997 and the PBS series Boatworks. After a year of treatment, he was declared cancer-free and returned to television in 1998 as Captain Jim Kennedy III in Love Boat: The Next Wave. It aired on UPN for two seasons. In 2000, he made his Broadway debut as Billy Flynn in the musical Chicago and also starred in the North American tour of the musical, in 1999 and in 2000. The next year, he costarred in Emeril, a sitcom starring celebrity chef Emeril Lagasse. While it was critically panned, he received good notices for his work on it. It would be his last role in a television series. Urich's final television film, Night of the Wolf, aired on Animal Planet the night before his death.

== Personal life ==
=== Marriages and children ===
Urich's first marriage was to actress Barbara Rucker in 1968. They divorced in 1974. He married actress Heather Menzies (1949–2017) in 1975. They adopted three children. They remained married until his death in 2002.

== Illness and death ==
In July 1996, Urich announced his diagnosis with synovial sarcoma, a rare cancer affecting soft tissue. Despite his illness, he continued working, underwent treatment and advocated for cancer cure research. He received an award from the John Wayne Cancer Institute and the Gilda Radner Courage Award for his cancer awareness efforts. He and his wife established the Urich Fund at the University of Michigan Comprehensive Cancer Center to support cancer research. Additionally, Urich donated $125,000, his winnings from an episode of Who Wants to Be a Millionaire. He was declared cancer-free in 1998 and became the national spokesperson for the American Cancer Society that year.

In November 2001, Urich shared in an interview that doctors had found lumps in his body, but a new medication had successfully treated them. A week before his death, he was hospitalized at Los Robles Hospital & Medical Center in Thousand Oaks with respiratory problems. He died there on April 16, 2002. His funeral Mass was held on April 19 at St. Charles Borromeo Church in North Hollywood, Los Angeles. A statement was released by his publicist Cindy Guagenti, and said Urich's wife and three children were with him when he died.

Urich's body was cremated, and his ashes interred at the family's vacation home in Prince Edward County, Ontario, Canada. A memorial stands in the West Lake Church of Christ Cemetery, near their vacation home.

== Legacy ==
Urich and his wife helped to raise money for the Eccles Performing Arts Centers at the Park City High School in Park City, Utah. After his death, the school established the Robert Urich Scholarship fund in his honor. In addition, they established the Robert and Heather Urich Fund for Sarcoma Research at the University of Michigan Comprehensive Cancer Center. She also had cancer and was an ovarian cancer survivor. Heather continued to work for the center, until she died from brain cancer on December 24, 2017, surrounded by their three children.

Urich's hometown of Toronto, Ohio, named the Robert Urich Interchange in his honor. It connects the town to Ohio State Route 7. For his contribution to the television industry, Urich has a star on the Hollywood Walk of Fame located at 7083 Hollywood Boulevard. Until Usher was added, he was the only person with a name starting with the letter U on the walk.

== Filmography ==
Film
Year	Title	Role	Notes
1973	Magnum Force	Officer Mike Grimes	
1982	Endangered Species	Ruben Castle	
1984	The Ice Pirates	Jason	
1984	Invitation to Hell	Matt Winslow	
1985	Turk 182	Terry Lynch	
1988	April Morning	Joseph	Credit at beginning only
1992	Jock: A True Tale of Friendship	Rocky	Alternative title: Jock of the Bushveld
1994	Jock of the Bushveld	Jack 'Rocky Mountain Jack'	
2002	Clover Bend	Bill	

Television
Year	Title	Role	Notes
1972	The F.B.I.	Davie Stroud	Episode: "The Runner"
1973	Kung Fu	Greg Dundee	Episode: "Blood Brother"
1973	Owen Marshall: Counselor at Law	Unknown	Episode: "A Girl Named Tham"
1973	Bob & Carol & Ted & Alice	Bob Sanders	12 episodes
1973	Marcus Welby, M.D.	Mike Lowry	Episode: "Death Is Only a Side Effect"
1974	Killdozer!	'Mack' McCarthy	Television film
1974	Nakia	Unknown	Episode: "A Beginning in the Wilderness"
1975	The Specialists	Dr. William Nugent	Television film Credited as Robert York
1975	Gunsmoke	Manolo Etchahoun	Episode: "Manolo"
1975–1976	S.W.A.T.	Officer Jim Street	37 episodes
1977	Bunco	Walker	Television film
1977	Soap	Peter Campbell, "The Tennis Player"	8 episodes
1977–1978	Tabitha	Paul Thurston	12 episodes
1977–1978	The Love Boat	Various Roles	3 episodes
1978	Charlie's Angels	Dan Tanna	Episode: "Angels in Vegas"
1978	Leave Yesterday Behind	David Lyle	TV film
1978–1981	Vega$	Dan Tanna	69 episodes
1979	When She Was Bad...	Bob Morgan	Television film
1979	Password Plus	Himself	Game Show Participant / Celebrity Guest Star
1979	Merry Christmas from the Grand Ole Opry	Himself	Co-host
1980	The Shadow Box	Unknown	Television film Uncredited
1980	Fighting Back: The Rocky Bleier Story	Rocky Bleier	Television film
1981	Killing at Hell's Gate	Charles Duke	Television film
1982	The Billy Crystal Comedy Hour	Unknown	Episode #1.2
1982	Take Your Best Shot	Jess Marriner	Television film
1982–1983	Gavilan	Robert Gavilan	13 episodes
1983	Princess Daisy	Patrick Shannon	Miniseries
1984	Mistral's Daughter	Jason Darcy	Miniseries
1984	His Mistress	Allen Beck	Television film
1985	Scandal Sheet	Ben Rowan	Television film
1985–1988	Spenser: For Hire	Spenser	65 episodes
1986	The Defiant Ones	Johnny 'Joker' Johnson	Television film
1986	The Disney Sunday Movie	Michael Riley, Age 40	Episode: "Young Again"
1987	Amerika	Peter Bradford	Miniseries
1988	Cheers	Himself	Episode: "Woody for Hire Meets Norman of the Apes"
1988	Hallmark Hall of Fame	Joseph Simmons	Episode: "April Morning"
1988-1995	National Geographic Explorer	Hosts Narrator	110 episodes
1989	The Comeback	Scotty Malloy	Television film
1989	She Knows Too Much	Harry	Television film
1989	Lonesome Dove	Jake Spoon	Miniseries
1989	Night Walk	Detective Jake Simon	Television film
1989	Spooner	Harry Spooner / Michael Norlon	Television film
1989	Murder by Night	Allan Strong	Television film
1990	Blind Faith	Rob Marshall	Television miniseries
1990	A Quiet Little Neighborhood, a Perfect Little Murder	Ross Pegler	Television film
1990	83 Hours 'Til Dawn	Bradley Burdock	Television film
1990	Carol & Company	Mr. Carmen	Episode: "Teacher, Teacher"
1990–1991	American Dreamer	Tom Nash	17 episodes
1991	Stranger at My Door	Joe Fortier	Television film
1991	...And Then She Was Gone	Jack Bauer	Television film
1992	Survive the Savage Sea	Jack Carpenter	Television film
1992	Blind Man's Bluff	Thomas Booker	Television film
1992	Double Edge	Harry Carter	Television film Alternative title: Hit Woman
1992	Revolver	Nick Suster	Television film
1992–1993	Crossroads	Johnny Hawkins	9 episodes
1993	Evening Shade	Steve	Episode: "Frieda and the Preacher"
1993	Deadly Relations	Leonard J. Fagot	Television film
1993	Spenser: Ceremony	Spenser	Television film
1993	It Had to Be You	Mitch Quinn	6 episodes
1994	Spenser: Pale Kings and Princes	Spenser	Television film
1994	To Save the Children	Jake Downey	Television film
1994	A Perfect Stranger	Alex Hale	Television film
1994	Spenser: The Judas Goat	Spenser	Television film
1995	Alien Encounters: From New Tomorrowland	Narrator	Disney television documentary
1995	Spenser: A Savage Place	Spenser	Television film
1995	A Horse for Danny	Eddie Fortuna	Television film
1995	She Stood Alone: The Tailhook Scandal	Admiral Williams	Television film
1996	Captains Courageous	Captain Matthew Troop	Television film
1996	The Angel of Pennsylvania Avenue	Angus Feagan	Television film
1996	The Lazarus Man	Lazarus / James Cathcart	20 episodes
1997	The Nanny	Judge Jerry Moran	Episode: "Samson, He Denied Her"
1997	Final Descent	Captain Glen 'Lucky' Singer	Television film
1998	Invasion America	Briggs	Unknown episodes
1998–1999	Love Boat: The Next Wave	Captain Jim Kennedy III	25 episodes
1999	Final Run	Captain Glen 'Lucky' Singer	Television film
1999	Miracle on the 17th Green	Mitch McKinley	Television film
2001	Late Boomers	Dennis	Television film
2001	For Love of Olivia	Horton Roundtree	Television film
2001	Emeril	Jerry McKenney	10 episodes
2002	The President's Man: A Line in the Sand	President Adam Mayfield	Television film
2002	Night of the Wolf	Purly Owens	Television film
2002	Aftermath	Jack	Television film (final film role)
