= Gavilan (TV series) =

- Genre: Adventure drama
- Created by: Tom Mankiewicz
- Starring: Robert Urich; Kate Reid; Patrick Macnee
- Composers: Steve Dorff; Larry Herbstritt
- Country of origin: United States
- Original language: English
- No. of seasons: 1
- No. of episodes: 13 (3 unaired)

Production
- Running time: 60 minutes
- Production companies: Mandy Films; MGM Television

Original release
- Network: NBC
- Release: October 26, 1982 – March 18, 1983

Gavilan is an American adventure drama television series that aired on NBC from October 26, 1982 to March 18, 1983.

== Plot ==
Robert Gavilan (Robert Urich) is a former CIA agent who now works for the Oceanographic Institute, which is headed by Marion Jaworski. Every now and then, someone from Gavilan's past as a CIA spy comes to him asking for his help. Or, on one of the jobs that Gavilan is on, the situation somehow turns into trouble, or someone he knows just needs his help as both as former spy, or as an oceanographer. Milo Bentley is an old friend of his father's, who stays in Robert's guest room, and uses his history with his father to freeload, and mooch off him.

== Cast ==
- Robert Urich as Robert Gavilan
- Kate Reid as Marion Jaworski
- Patrick Macnee as Milo Bentley

== US television ratings ==
Season	Episodes	Start date	End date	Nielsen rank	Nielsen rating
1982-83	13	October 26, 1982	March 18, 1983	90	N/A

== Episodes ==
No.	Title	Directed by	Written by	Original release date
1	"Sarah and the Buzz"	Charlie Picerni	Unknown	October 26, 1982
2	"Pirates"	Cliff Bole	Story by : Nicholas J. Corea; Teleplay by : Mark Frost	November 9, 1982
3	"By the Sword"	Paul Krasny & Winrich Kolbe	Chris Bunch & Allan Cole	November 16, 1982
4	"A Matter of Geography"	Paul Krasny	Bruce Cervi	November 23, 1982
5	"The Hydra"	Charlie Picerni	Chris Bunch	November 30, 1982
6	"A Drop in the Ocean"	Alan Cooke	Story by : Rick Edelstein; Teleplay by : Tom Sawyer	December 7, 1982
7	"Designated Hero"	Charles Picerni	Nicholas J. Corea	December 14, 1982
8	"The Best Friend Money Can Buy"	Don Chaffey	Mark Frost	December 21, 1982
9	"The Guns of Harry August"	Charles Picerni	Robert Van Scoyk	December 28, 1982
10	"The Midas Keys"	Paul Krasny	Bruce Cervi	March 18, 1983
11	"The Diamond Goddess"	N/A	N/A	Unaired
12	"The Proteus Affair"	N/A	N/A	Unaired
13	"Rios En La Mar"	N/A	N/A	Unaired

== Production ==
The show was made by Tom Mankiewicz and Leonard Goldberg, who had enjoyed success with Hart to Hart. Fernando Lamas was originally cast as the conman. The lead character was named after the boxer Kid Gavilán (often spelled Kid Gavilan in US). NBC made an order for 13 episodes but the show was taken off the air after ten episodes had aired. Episodes were rerun on TNT in 1994 alongside Chicago Story with Dennis Franz.

== See also ==
- 1982–83 United States network television schedule

== Bibliography ==
- Tim Brooks and Earle Marsh, The Complete Directory to Prime Time Network and Cable TV Shows 1946–Present, Ninth edition (New York: Ballantine Books, 2007) ISBN 978-0-345-49773-4
