= Shay Gorman =

Irish actor (1923–1999)

- Born: 18 April 1923; Dublin, Ireland
- Died: 19 April 1999
- Occupation: Actor
- Known for: Acting in British films
- Notable work: Danger Man

Séamus "Shay" Gorman (18 April 1923 – 19 April 1999) was an Irish actor from Dublin who largely appeared in British films and television programmes.

One example of which was his 1960 Danger Man appearance in the television series episode "The Sanctuary" as Brannigan.

== Selected filmography ==
- The Steel Bayonet (1957)
- Kill Her Gently (1957)
- Nine Hours to Rama (1963)
- Calculated Risk (1963)
- The Eyes of Annie Jones (1964)
- Island of Terror (1966)
- Ascendancy (1983)
- Coronation Street (1993)
- Father Ted (1995)
