= Final Run =

- Film poster
- Genre: Action adventure
- Written by: Michael Braverman
- Directed by: Armand Mastroianni
- Starring: Robert Urich; Patricia Kalember; John de Lancie; Cathy Lee Crosby; Udo Kier
- Music by: Louis Febre
- Countries of origin: Canada; United States
- Original language: English

Production
- Executive producers: Tom Patricia; Mike Robe
- Producer: George W. Perkins
- Production location: Vancouver
- Cinematography: Henry M. Lebo
- Editor: Peter V. White
- Running time: 90 minutes
- Production companies: Columbia TriStar Television; Lions Gate Television; Mandalay Television

Original release
- Network: CBS
- Release: October 10, 1999

Final Run is a 1999 television film, starring Robert Urich. It was written by Michael Braverman and directed by Armand Mastroianni. The film was originally aired on CBS on October 10, 1999. Final Run is a sequel for Final Descent.

== Plot ==
The Grand Royale is a luxury train, which is completely controlled by a computerized system. However, an accidental drink spill on a circuit board by the train pilot causes cascading failures, and soon it becomes a runaway. With the train being out of control, old-fashioned Glen "Lucky" Singer (Robert Urich) has to save the day and slow down the train. Otherwise, a disaster will happen, and the train will be destroyed.

== International titles ==
- Katastrophe beim Express (Germany)
- Disaster Express: Rēru-jō no Kyōfu (ディザスター・エクスプレス - レール上の恐怖) (Japan)
- O Trem Desgovernado (Brazil)

== Cast ==
- Robert Urich as Captain Glen "Lucky" Singer
- Patricia Kalember as Connie Phipps-Singer
- John de Lancie as George Bouchard
- Cathy Lee Crosby as Sandy Holmestead
- Udo Kier as Reddick, Train Control Supervisor
- Scott Vickaryous as Scott Sparkman
- Stephen E. Miller as Lieutenant Colonel Frank O'Hearn
- Jason Schombing as Wilson Fitch, Train Controller
- Alf Humphreys as Ben Hofflund (credited as Alfred E. Humphreys)

== Reception ==
Andy Webb from The Movie Scene gave "Final Run" two out five stars. He described the film as

so terrible that it is bloody hilarious... There are movies which have made me cry tears of sadness, there are movies which have intentionally made me cry fits of laughter but "Final Run" made me cry because it is so bad, so terrible that it become hilariously good. In this follow up to "Final Descent" we have a computerized train out of control, a cliche in itself but that is just the first of a long list of cliches from a son not liking his step mum to a selfish Senator not caring about anyone else. Add to this more terrible dialogue and acting than I have seen in a long time and some ropey special effects and instead of being an exciting runaway train disaster movie "Final Run" becomes gloriously bad in so many ways.
