= Melissa Hart (actress) =

American actress, singer, and teacher

- Education: Northwestern University (B.A.); Florida Atlantic University (M.F.A.)
- Occupations: Actress; singer; teacher

Melissa Hart is an American actress, singer, and teacher. She made her Broadway debut in 1966 as an ensemble member in Jerry Bock's The Apple Tree. As Barbara Harris's understudy, she replaced the actress as the various heroines in that musical for several performances. In 1969 she took over the role of Sally Bowles in the original production of John Kander's Cabaret, a role she had previously performed in the musical's first National Tour. In 1970 she created the role of Meredith Montgomery in the original Broadway cast of Tom Mankiewicz's Georgy; a performance for which she garnered a Tony Award nomination for Best Featured Actress in a Musical at the 24th Tony Awards. She soon after performed the role of Fran Kubelik in the National Tour of Burt Bacharach's Promises, Promises.

Hart attended Elgin High School. She began her professional education at the University of Illinois Urbana-Champaign where she was a voice major. She transferred to Northwestern University where she earned a Bachelor of Arts in Theatre. She later pursued graduate studies in acting and directing at Florida Atlantic University where she earned a Master of Fine Arts in 1990. In New York City, she studied voice with Ellen Faull. She also studied singing with Richard Miller and speech language vocology and vocal health training with Anat Keidar.

During the 1970s and 1980s, Hart was highly active in regional theatres throughout the United States and in Off-Broadway productions. She won a Joseph Jefferson Award for her portrayal of Amy in Stephen Sondheim's Company at the Forum Theatre in Chicago. After a 27-year absence from Broadway, she returned to portray Baroness Von Thunder and serve as the Understudy for the Old Lady in the 1997 revival of Leonard Bernstein's Candide. Later that year she performed the role of Helene in the original cast of Frank Wildhorn's The Scarlet Pimpernel.

Hart has served on the theatre faculties of Florida Atlantic University (1983, 1986), University of Florida (1990–1994), Pennsylvania State University (1994–1996), and Marymount Manhattan College (1996–2008). She has also taught masterclasses and workshops at numerous institutions, including the Baltimore School for the Arts, the Governor's School for the Arts (Kentucky), the Interlochen Center for the Arts, the University of Miami, the University of Oklahoma, the University of Wisconsin–Stevens Point, and at the National Convention of the National Association of Teachers of Singing among others. She currently teaches at the Saint Paul Conservatory for Performing Artists.

In 2016, Hart was named the Dorothy F. Schmidt College of Arts and Letters Distinguished Alumni for her 1990 Masters of Fine Arts from Florida Atlantic University.
