= Peter V. White =

American film editor

Peter V. Smith
- Occupation: Film editor
- Years active: 1976-present

Peter V. White is an American film editor with more than 45 credits to his name, with the majority being television films.

== Filmography ==
=== Editing ===
Year	Title	Notes
1976	Neil Diamond: The 'Thank You Australia' Concert	TV special
1983-84	Ripley's Believe It or Not!	2 episodes
1984	Partners in Crime	6 episodes
1985	MacGyver	Episode "The Gauntlet"
1986-1987	Sledge Hammer!	11 episodes
1987	Kids Like These	TV movie
1988	Stranger on My Land	TV movie
1988	God Bless the Child	TV movie
1988	A Stoning in Fulham County	TV movie
1988	Disaster at Silo 7	TV movie
1989	I Know My First Name Is Steven	Miniseries
1990	Common Ground	Miniseries
1990	A Quiet Little Neighborhood, a Perfect Little Murder	TV movie
1990	The Spirit of '76	Additional film editor
1990-1991	Parker Lewis Can't Lose	9 episodes
1991	An Inconvenient Woman	Miniseries
1991	One Against the Wind	TV movie
1991	The Story Lady	TV movie
1993	Bonds of Love	TV movie
1993	When Love Kills: The Seduction of John Hearn	TV movie
1993	The Adventures of Brisco County, Jr.	Episode: “Socrates’ Sister”
1994	Out of Darkness	TV movie
1994	Menendez: A Killing in Beverly Hills	TV movie
1994	Jack Reed: A Search for Justice	TV movie
1995	Tecumseh: The Last Warrior	TV movie
1995	A Mother's Prayer	TV movie
1995	Jack Reed: One of Our Own	TV movie
1996	Terminal	TV movie
1996	Sins of Silence	TV movie
1996	My Son Is Innocent	TV movie
1996	Jack Reed: Death and Vengeance	TV movie
1996	An Unexpected Family	TV movie
1997	Mother Knows Best	TV movie
1997	Indefensible: The Truth About Edward Brannigan	TV movie
1998	The Color of Courage	TV movie
1999	Fatal Error	TV movie
1999	First Daughter	TV movie
1999	Final Run	TV movie
2000	Nowhere to Land	TV movie
2000	The Truth About Jane	TV movie
2000	First Target	TV movie
2001	What Girls Learn	TV movie
2002	Developing Sheldon	
2003	An Unexpected Love	TV movie
2004	Jack	TV movie
2004	Time and Again	Short film
2005	Missing in America	
2022	Space Baby	

=== Producing ===
Year	Title	Notes
1991	The Story Lady	Associate Producer

=== Acting ===
Year	Title	Role	Notes
2021	Space Baby	Man on telephone (voice)	
