= Sally Bowles =

Fictional character created by Christopher Isherwood

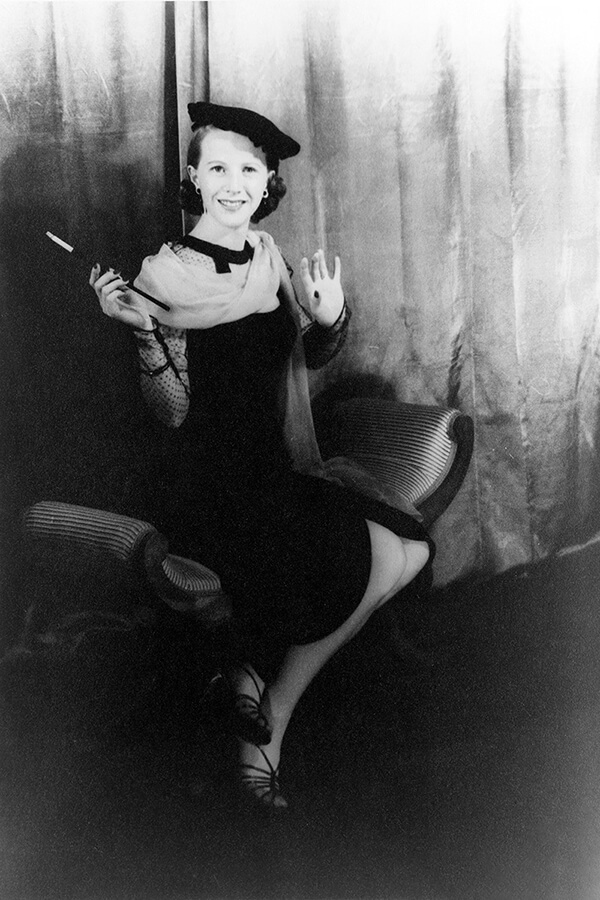
- Julie Harris as Sally Bowles in the 1951 play I Am a Camera
- First appearance: Sally Bowles (1937 novella)
- Created by: Christopher Isherwood
- Based on: Jean Ross

In-universe information
- Gender: Female
- Occupation: Cabaret singer
- Nationality: British

Sally Bowles (/boʊlz/) is a fictional character created by English-American novelist Christopher Isherwood and based on 19-year-old cabaret singer Jean Ross. The character debuted in Isherwood's novella Sally Bowles, published in October 1937 by Hogarth Press. Critics regard the novella as among Isherwood's most accomplished works of fiction. The work was republished in the 1939 novel Goodbye to Berlin by Hogarth Press and in the 1945 anthology The Berlin Stories by New Directions.

In the 1937 novella, a British flapper named Sally Bowles moonlights as a cabaret singer in Weimar-era Berlin during the twilight of the Jazz Age. By day, Sally aspires to be a film actress employed by UFA, the German production company. By night, she works as a chanteuse at an underground club called The Lady Windermere near the Tauentzienstraße. Hoping to become a famous actress or the mistress of a wealthy man, Sally engages in a series of sexual flings, becomes pregnant, and undergoes an abortion. She departs Berlin on the eve of Adolf Hitler's ascension as Chancellor of Germany.

Sally Bowles appears as a central character in the 1951 John Van Druten stage play I Am a Camera, the 1955 film of the same name, the 1966 musical stage adaptation Cabaret and the 1972 film adaptation of the musical. The character purportedly inspired Truman Capote's Holly Golightly in his 1958 novella Breakfast at Tiffany's, and she appears in novels by other authors. In June 1979, critic Howard Moss commented on the character's remarkable longevity over many decades: "It is almost fifty years since Sally Bowles shared the recipe for a Prairie oyster with Herr Issyvoo [sic] in a vain attempt to cure a hangover" and yet the character lives on "from story to play to movie to musical to movie-musical."

Following the popularity of the Sally Bowles character, tabloid reporters hounded Jean Ross seeking information about her colourful past in Weimar-era Berlin. She believed her popular association with the naïve character of Bowles occluded her lifelong work as a political writer and social activist. According to her daughter Sarah Caudwell, Ross never "felt any sense of identity with the character of Sally Bowles, which in many respects she thought more closely modeled on" Isherwood's gay friends, many of whom "fluttered around town exclaiming how sexy the storm troopers looked in their uniforms".

== Creation and description ==
=== Inspiration ===
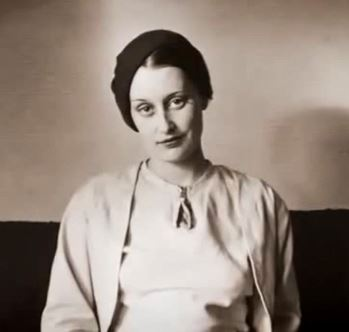
Jean Ross, a cabaret singer in the Weimar Republic, served as the primary basis for Isherwood's character.

Sally Bowles is based on Jean Ross, a vivacious British flapper and later an ardent Stalinist, whom Isherwood knew while sojourning in Weimar-era Berlin during the twilight of the Jazz Age. Belying her humble circumstances in Berlin, the 19-year-old Ross was the offspring of a wealthy Scottish cotton merchant and came from a privileged background. She had "a long, thin handsome face, aristocratic nose, glossy dark hair" with large brown eyes.

Isherwood noted that the teenage Ross was "more essentially British than Sally; she grumbled like a true Englishwoman, with her grin-and-bear-it grin. And she was tougher. She never struck Christopher as being sentimental or the least bit sorry for herself. Like Sally, she boasted continually about her lovers." According to Isherwood, Ross was a sexually liberated young woman who once claimed to have had sex with another performer in view of the audience during Max Reinhardt's production of Tales of Hoffmann circa Winter 1931: (Note: After Ross' death, her daughter Sarah Caudwell criticized Isherwood's memories of Ross' sexual exhibitionism in Max Reinhardt's The Tales of Hoffmann production. She dismissed his claims as puerile fantasy. However, acquaintance Gerald Hamilton claimed Ross was known for her sexual exhibitionism, including entertaining guests in the nude.)

In the course of the ball scene at the Venetian palace of the courtesan Giulietta, several pairs of lovers were carried onto the stage. Each pair reclined on a litter, locked in each other's arms. These lovers were merely extras and few members of the audience can have paid any attention to their embraces, once they had made their entrance, for a dazzling corps de ballet was performing in the middle of the stage. But Christopher watched one pair of lovers intently, through opera glasses, until the end of the scene. Even so, he couldn't be sure if what Jean had told him was true—that she had sex with her partner in full view of the audience.

When crafting the "divinely decadent" Sally Bowles as a literary character, Isherwood purloined the surname "Bowles" from American writer Paul Bowles whom he had likewise met in Berlin in 1931 and to whom he was sexually attracted. Explaining his choice, he wrote, "[I] liked the sound of it and also the looks of its owner." Isherwood introduces Sally in his 1937 novella by writing:

A few minutes later, Sally herself arrived. 'Am I terribly late, Fritz darling?'.... Sally laughed. She was dressed in black silk, with a small cape over her shoulders and a little cap like a page-boy's stuck jauntily on one side of her head.... I noticed that her finger-nails were painted emerald green, a colour unfortunately chosen, for it called attention to her hands, which were much stained by cigarette smoking and as dirty as a little girl's. She was dark.... Her face was long and thin, powdered dead white. She had very large brown eyes which should have been darker, to match her hair and the pencil she used for her eyebrows.

Isherwood described Ross' singing talent as mediocre: "She had a surprisingly deep, husky voice. She sang badly, (Note: Peter Parker notes that Ross "claimed that Isherwood 'grossly underrated' her singing abilities, but her family agreed that this was one aspect of Sally Bowles that Isherwood got absolutely right".) without any expression, her hands hanging down at her sides—yet her performance was, in its own way, effective because of her startling appearance and her air of not caring a curse of what people thought of her." Likewise, acquaintance Stephen Spender recalled that Ross' singing ability was underwhelming and forgettable: "In my mind's eye, I can see her now in some dingy bar standing on a platform and singing so inaudibly that I could not hear her from the back of the room where I was discreetly seated."

In the 1937 novella, Sally is a British flapper who is the wayward daughter of a Lancashire mill-owner and an heiress. She is a "self-indulgent upper-middle-class British tourist who could escape Berlin whenever she chose." By day, she is an aspiring film actress hoping to work for UFA, the German film production company. By night, she is a chanteuse at an underground club called The Lady Windermere located near the Tauentzienstraße. She aspires to be a famous actress or, as an alternative, to ensnare a wealthy man to keep her as his mistress. Unsuccessful at both, Sally departs Berlin on the eve of Adolf Hitler's ascension as Chancellor of Germany and is last heard from in the form of a postcard sent from Rome, Italy, with no return address.

=== Novella ===
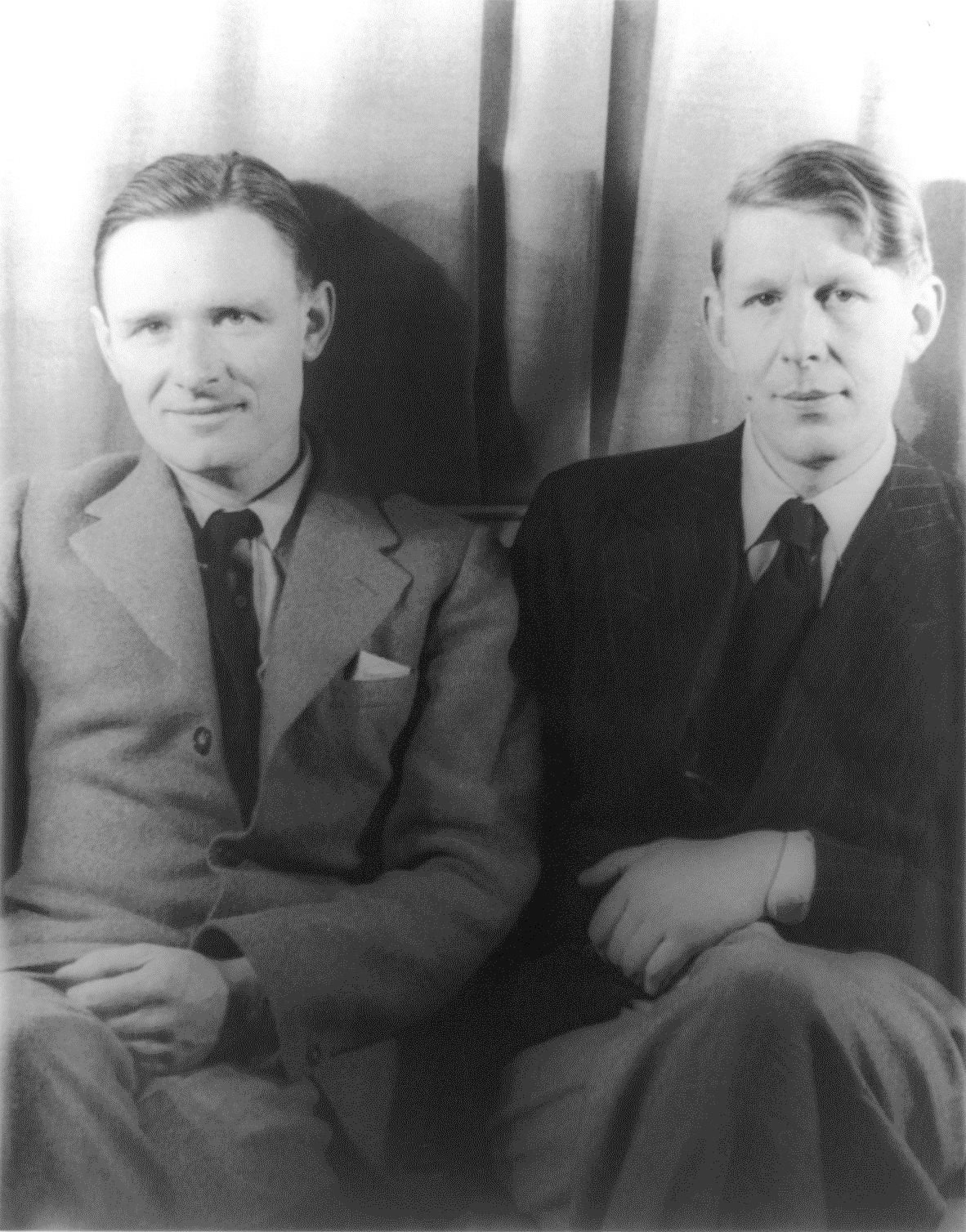
Isherwood in 1939

After Hitler's ascension as Chancellor of Germany on 30 January 1933, Isherwood began to notice the sinister developments occurring in the country. "Adolf, with his rectangular black moustache, has come to stay and brought all his friends," he wrote to a friend, "Nazis are to be enrolled as 'auxiliary police,' which means that one must now not only be murdered but that it is illegal to offer any resistance." After Hitler passed the Enabling Act cementing his power, Isherwood fled Germany on 13 May 1933, initially traveling to Greece.

In late Spring 1933, while in an extended period of uncertainty and dire financial straits, Isherwood began drafting the nucleus that would become the 1937 novella Sally Bowles. He wrote to Ross' friend and later companion Olive Mangeot in July 1933 that he had written a first draft. He revised the manuscript over the next three years, completing his final draft on 21 June 1936. In a letter to editor John Lehmann dated 16 January, 1936, Isherwood briefly outlined the piece, envisioning it as part of his unfinished novel The Lost which became Mr Norris Changes Trains. He described it as akin to the work of Anthony Hope and as "an attempt to satirize the romance-of-prostitution racket. Good heter [sic] stuff."

Later in 1936, Isherwood submitted the piece to Lehmann for publication in his literary magazine, New Writing. Lehmann liked the piece but felt that it was too lengthy for his magazine. He also was concerned about the inclusion of Sally's abortion in the manuscript, fearing both that his printers might refuse to typeset it and that Jean Ross might file a libel action. In a January 1937 letter, Isherwood expressed his conviction that, without the abortion incident, Sally would be reduced to a "little capricious bitch" and that the omission would leave the novella without a climax.

After his correspondence with Lehmann, Isherwood likewise feared a libel suit by Jean Ross and sought her permission to publish the novella. Ross hesitated in giving her consent as she feared the novella's abortion episode—which was factual and a painful memory—would strain her relations with her powerful family. Ross relented and gave her permission, and Hogarth published the volume in October 1937.

The 1937 novella received favorable reviews from literary critics, and commentators described the novella as "one of Isherwood's most accomplished pieces of writing." Following the tremendous popularity of the Sally Bowles character in subsequent decades, Ross regretted her decision to allow the work to be published. For the remainder of her life, Ross believed her popular association with the naïve character of Bowles occluded her lifelong work as a professional journalist, political writer, and social activist.

"[Ross] never liked Goodbye to Berlin, nor felt any sense of identity with the character of Sally Bowles, which in many respects she thought more closely modeled on one of Isherwood's male friends.... She never cared enough, however, to be moved to any public rebuttal. She did from time to time settle down conscientiously to write a letter, intending to explain to Isherwood the ways in which she thought he had misunderstood her; but it seldom progressed beyond 'Dear Christopher.'"

— Sarah Caudwell, Jean Ross' daughter, The New Statesman, October 1986

Although Isherwood never publicly revealed that Ross was the inspiration for Sally until after her death in April 1973, other mutual acquaintances were less discreet, and many individuals who knew Ross had little difficulty in identifying her as the character's genesis. Ross claimed that her former partner, journalist Claud Cockburn, was the first person to reveal her identity to his gossiping friends in the British press.

Despite this public unmasking, Ross did not seek any benefit or publicity from her association with the character. According to her daughter Sarah Caudwell, Ross never "felt any sense of identity with the character of Sally Bowles, which in many respects she thought more closely modeled on" Isherwood's gay friends, many of whom "fluttered around town exclaiming how sexy the storm troopers looked in their uniforms".

When Cabaret was first launched as a musical in 1966, Ross was badgered by reporters and declined all invitations to see the show. Ross was purportedly vexed by the lack of political awareness demonstrated by the tabloid reporters—particularly those from the Daily Mail—who stalked her and hounded her with invasive questions about her colourful past. She declared: "They say they want to know about Berlin in the Thirties, but they don't want to know about the unemployment or the poverty or the Nazis marching through the streets. All they want to know is how many men I went to bed with."

== Portrayals ==
=== I Am a Camera ===
"John van Druten's Sally wasn't quite Christopher's Sally; John made her humor cuter and naughtier. And Julie [Harris] contributed much of herself to the character. She seemed vulnerable but untouchable... stubbornly obedient to the voices of her fantasies; a bohemian Joan of Arc."

— Christopher Isherwood, Christopher and His Kind, 1976

American actress Julie Harris originated the role of Sally Bowles in John Van Druten's 1951 play I Am a Camera, for which she received the 1952 Tony Award for Best Performance by a Leading Actress in a Play.

In his memoirs, Isherwood recounts how "when Julie Harris was rehearsing for the part of Sally in the American production of I Am a Camera, [director] John van Druten and Christopher discussed with her the possibility that nearly all of Sally's sex life is imaginary; and they agreed that the part should be played so that the audience wouldn't be able to make up its mind, either." Isherwood, in particular, was adamant that Sally not be portrayed as "a tart"—an avaricious prostitute. In a letter to John Van Druten, Isherwood explained that Sally "is a little girl who has listened to what the grown-ups had said about tarts, and who was trying to copy those things."

Following the play's critical acclaim, Isherwood ascribed the success entirely to Harris' performance as the insouciant Sally Bowles. Isherwood described Harris' performance as "more essentially Sally Bowles than the Sally of my book, and much more like Sally than the real girl [Ross] who long ago gave me the idea for my character". Barbara Baxley took over the role when Harris departed. Harris recreated the role for the bowlderized and heavily censored 1955 film adaptation, also titled I Am a Camera. Later, Dorothy Tutin starred as Sally in a successful 1954 British stage production.

=== Cabaret musical ===
Kelly Hunter as Sally Bowles

In his diary from October 1958, Isherwood records that a composer named Don Parks had expressed interest in writing a musical based on Sally but the author denied him permission. When I Am a Camera was finally adapted into the musical Cabaret in 1966, Jill Haworth originated the role of Sally. As the run continued, Penny Fuller, Anita Gillette, and Melissa Hart also played the part. Cabaret was revived on Broadway in 1987 with Alyson Reed playing Sally.

The musical was revived again in 1998 with Natasha Richardson as Sally. Richardson won the 1998 Tony Award for Best Actress in a Musical. As the run continued, actresses including Tina Arena, Jennifer Jason Leigh, Susan Egan, Joely Fisher, Gina Gershon, Deborah Gibson, Teri Hatcher, Melina Kanakaredes, Jane Leeves, Molly Ringwald, Brooke Shields, Lea Thompson, and Vanna White appeared in the role. The 2014 Broadway revival starred Michelle Williams as Sally, with Emma Stone and Sienna Miller as subsequent replacements.

Cabaret debuted on the West End in 1968 with Judi Dench in the role of Sally. A West End revival at The Strand Theatre in October 1986 featured Kelly Hunter as Sally Bowles and was the subject of printed criticism by both Jean Ross and her daughter Sarah Caudwell. Later West End revivals starred Toyah Willcox (1987), Jane Horrocks (1993), Anna Maxwell Martin (2006) and Jessie Buckley (2021) playing the part. Samantha Barks portrayed the role in the 2008–2009 UK National Tour.

=== Cabaret film ===
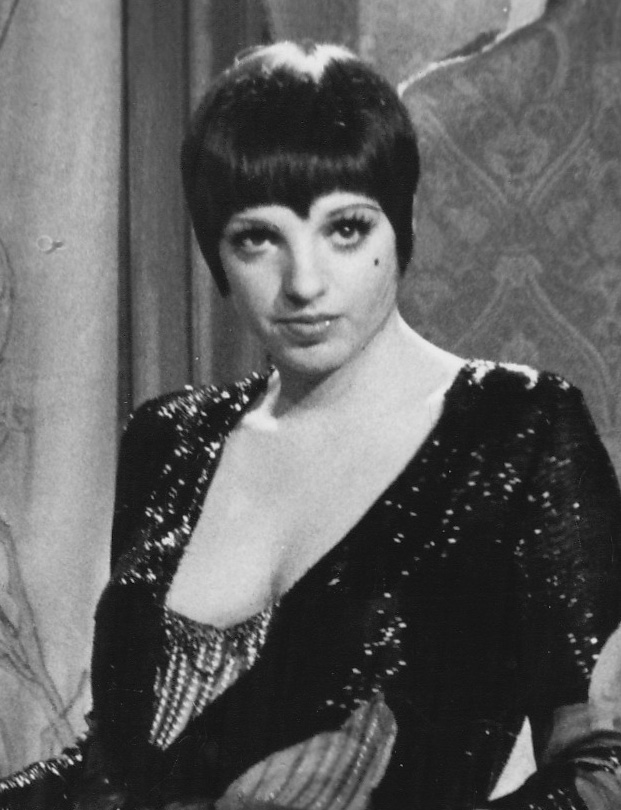
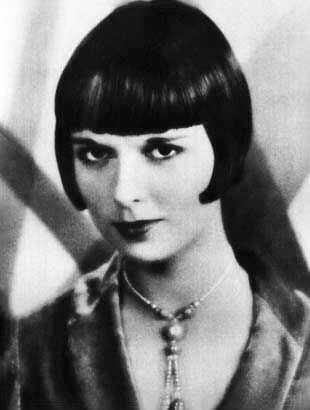
Liza Minnelli as Sally Bowles (left) in the 1972 film. Louise Brooks (right) served as the visual model for the 1972 film's depiction of Sally Bowles.

In 1972, the stage musical adaptation was in turn adapted as a film directed by Bob Fosse. The 1972 film's depiction of Sally differs significantly from earlier incarnations: she is American rather than British. According to unaccredited screenwriter Hugh Wheeler, he was tasked by ABC Pictures with bowdlerizing the source material and forced to change Sally's nationality as well as to transform her into a noble heroine to increase the film's commercial appeal. Key dialogue was likewise altered to make Sally appear more bisexual.

For her performance as Sally in the film, Liza Minnelli reinterpreted the character and—at the explicit suggestion of her father stage director Vincente Minnelli—she deliberately imitated film actress Louise Brooks, a flapper icon and sex symbol of the Jazz Age. Minnelli recalled:

I went to my father and asked him, 'What can you tell me about Thirties' glamour? Should I be emulating Marlene Dietrich or something?' And he said 'No, study everything you can about Louise Brooks.'

In particular, Minnelli drew on Brooks' "Lulu makeup and helmet-like coiffure." Brooks, like the character of Sally in the 1972 film, was an aspiring actress and American expat who went to Weimar-era Berlin in search of stardom. Ultimately, Minnelli won the Academy Award for Best Actress for her portrayal of Sally.

In a 1986 newspaper article published long after Jean Ross' death, her daughter Sarah Caudwell indicated that Ross disapproved of Minnelli's depiction of Sally Bowles in the 1972 film: "In the transformations of the novel for stage and cinema the characterisation of Sally has become progressively cruder" and, consequently, the literary character originally based on Ross had been transmogrified into a freakish vamp.

Isherwood himself was highly critical of the 1972 film adaptation due to its negative portrayal of homosexuality: "In the film of Cabaret, the male lead is called Brian Roberts. He is a bisexual Englishman; he has an affair with Sally and, later, with one of Sally's lovers, a German baron.... Brian's homosexual tendency is treated as an indecent but comic weakness to be snickered at, like bed-wetting."

== Legacy and influence ==
In June 1979, critic Howard Moss noted the peculiar resiliency of the character: "It is almost fifty years since Sally Bowles shared the recipe for a Prairie oyster with Herr Issyvoo [sic] in a vain attempt to cure a hangover" and yet the character in subsequent permutations lives on "from story to play to movie to musical to movie-musical."

Sally Bowles' life after the events of Goodbye to Berlin was imagined in After the Cabaret (1998) by British writer Hilary Bailey. The plot follows a young American academic, Greg Peters, who seeks to piece together the missing details of Sally's life for a new biography.

According to literary critics, the character of Sally Bowles inspired Truman Capote's Holly Golightly in his novella Breakfast at Tiffany's. Critics have alleged that both scenes and dialogue in Capote's 1958 novella have direct equivalencies in Isherwood's earlier 1937 work. Capote had befriended Isherwood in New York in the late 1940s, and Capote was an admirer of Isherwood's novels.

== Gallery ==
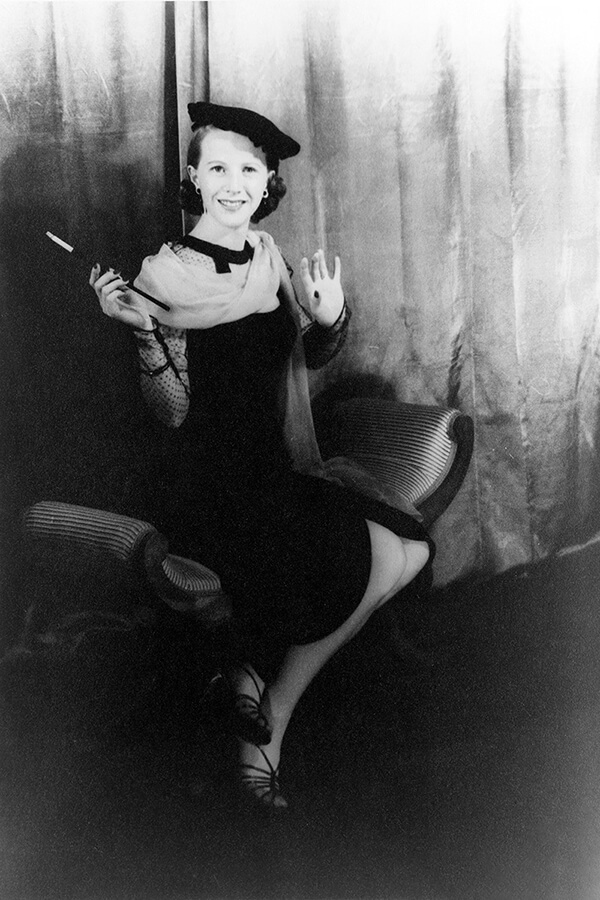
Julie Harris as Sally Bowles in I Am a Camera (1951)

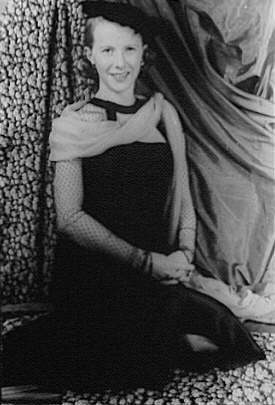
Harris, in costume as Sally Bowles, photographed by Carl Van Vechten

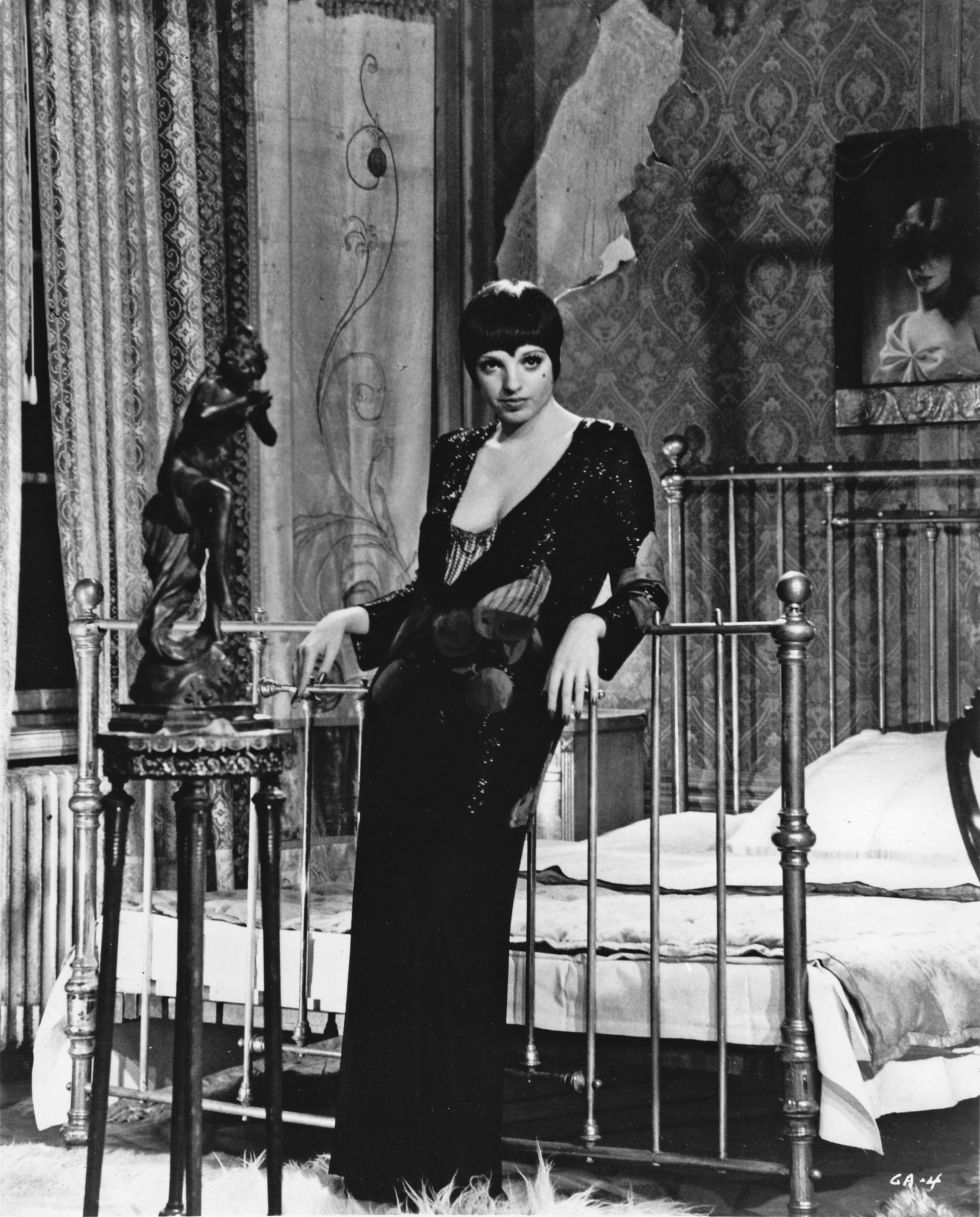
Liza Minnelli as Sally Bowles in Cabaret (1972)

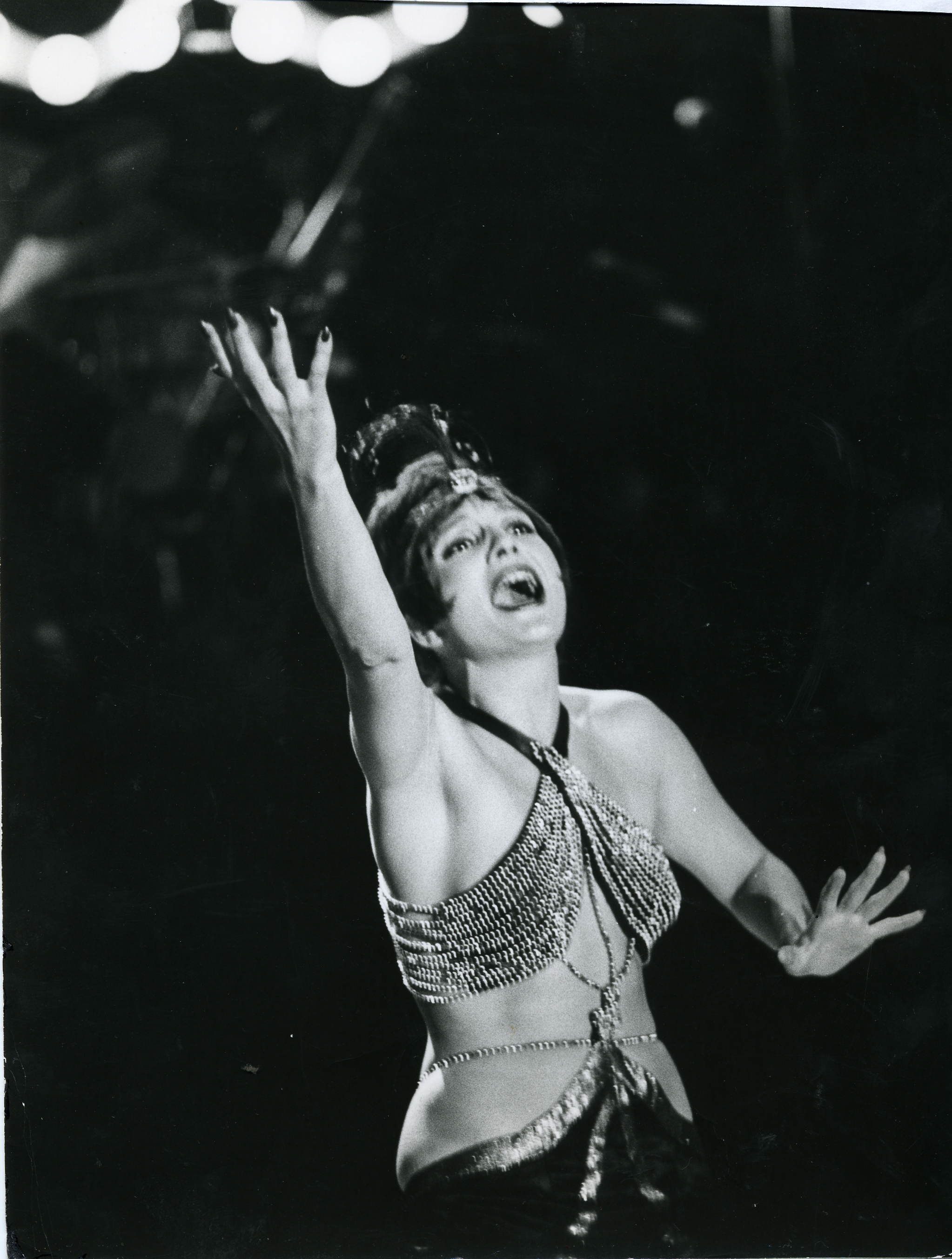
Anne Beate Odland as Sally Bowles, 1975
