= Taking the Heat =

- Written by: Dan Gordon
- Story by: Gary Hoffman
- Directed by: Tom Mankiewicz
- Starring: Tony Goldwyn; Lynn Whitfield; George Segal; Peter Boyle; Alan Arkin
- Country of origin: United States
- Original language: English

Production
- Running time: 91 minutes
- Production company: Viacom Pictures

Original release
- Network: Showtime
- Release: June 6, 1993

Taking the Heat is a 1993 American television film aired on Showtime. Directed by Tom Mankiewicz and written by Dan Gordon from a story by Gary Hoffman, the film follows a female cop and a murder witness avoiding the mob en route to a high-profile trial in New York City. The cast includes Tony Goldwyn and Lynn Whitfield in leading roles, with George Segal, Will Patton, Peter Boyle, Joe Grifasi, Alan Arkin, and Greg Germann in supporting roles.

== Cast ==
- Tony Goldwyn as Michael
- Lynn Whitfield as Carolyn Hunter
- George Segal as Kepler
- Will Patton as Hadley
- Peter Boyle as Judge
- Joe Grifasi as Lou Valentine
- Alan Arkin as Tommy Canard
- Greg Germann as Assistant D.A. Kennedy
