= Prairie oyster =

Drink with a raw egg and sauce

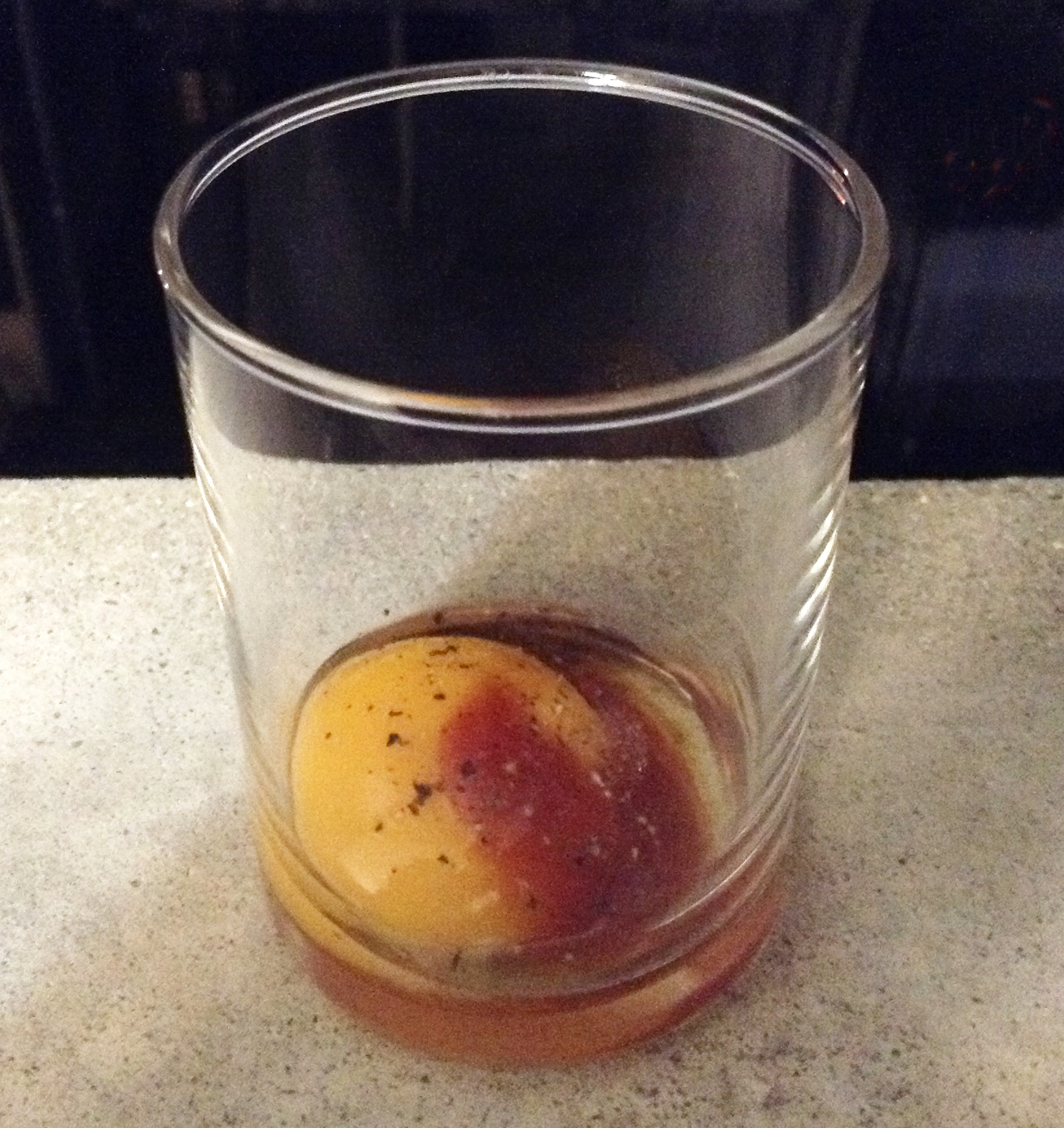
A simple prairie oyster in a glass.

A prairie oyster (sometimes also prairie cocktail), a traditional beverage, consists of a raw egg (often yolk alone), Worcestershire sauce, vinegar and/or hot sauce, salt, and ground black pepper. A small amount of tomato juice is sometimes added, reminiscent of a Bloody Mary. Occasionally a spirit such as brandy, vodka, or gin is also included, transforming the drink into a hair of the dog. The egg is broken into a glass so as not to break the yolk. The mixture is quickly swallowed.

The unbroken yolk gives the drink a texture similar to that of an oyster. An early account from 1859 associates the recipe with the prairies of "the Plains" and with "the Rocky Mountains" of western North America.

This mixture has a reputation as a classic traditional remedy for hangovers, and has featured in media for many years.

== Supposed hangover remedy properties ==
Though considered a traditional hangover remedy, the prairie oyster has not been scientifically proven to treat hangover symptoms. Headache experts say that a prairie oyster will not work as a remedy for a hangover.

It has been suggested that the raw egg in a prairie oyster may alleviate the symptoms of a hangover since eggs contain cysteine, an amino acid which helps the body break down acetaldehyde, a by-product of processing alcohol. However, there is no reliable evidence showing that consuming foods with this amino acid relieves hangover symptoms.

It has also been suggested that a prairie oyster may seem to relieve hangover symptoms by acting as a distraction and a placebo.

== In popular culture ==
The prairie oyster has appeared in popular media since the early 20th century. Its most notable appearance is in P. G. Wodehouse's Jeeves novels. It first appeared in the 1916 short story "Jeeves Takes Charge", where Jeeves cures Bertie Wooster's hangover with his version of a prairie oyster. The drink is not named in the story but it fits the description of a prairie oyster. As Jeeves says, "It is a little preparation of my own invention. It is the Worcester Sauce that gives it its colour. The raw egg makes it nutritious. The red pepper gives it its bite." Jeeves also serves this hangover cure in other stories. It is very effective, and Bertie suspects that there is more to the drink than the ingredients mentioned by Jeeves.

Gary Cooper's character Longfellow Deeds is served a prairie oyster in the 1935 film Mr. Deeds Goes to Town after "a binge" (not "a bender") the night before with reporter Babe Bennett (Jean Arthur).

Sally Bowles in the 1939 novel Goodbye to Berlin (the inspiration for the 1966 musical Cabaret and the 1972 film of the same name) appears to survive almost exclusively on prairie oysters.

The 1998 anime Cowboy Bebop also features an episode called Heavy Metal Queen where the main character Spike Spiegel tries to cure his hangover with a prairie oyster.

== See also ==
- Amber Moon, a similar drink containing alcohol
