= Tom Mankiewicz =

American writer, producer and director (1942–2010)

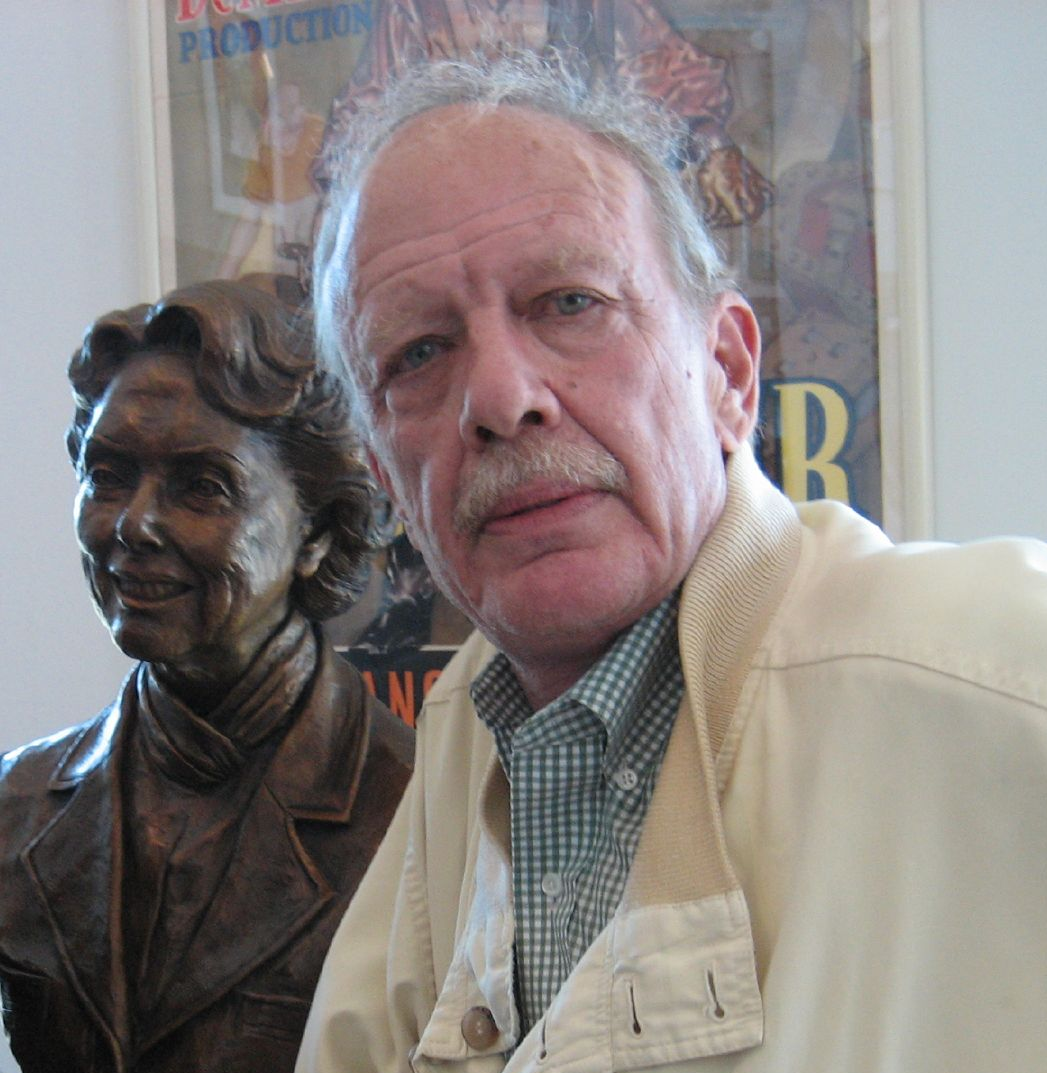
- Mankiewicz in 2007
- Born: Thomas Frank Mankiewicz; June 1, 1942; Los Angeles, California, U.S.
- Died: July 31, 2010 (aged 68); Los Angeles, California, U.S.
- Occupations: Writer, director, producer
- Parent(s): Rose Stradner (mother); Joseph L. Mankiewicz (father)
- Family: Mankiewicz

Thomas Frank Mankiewicz (June 1, 1942 – July 31, 2010) was an American screenwriter, director, and producer of motion pictures and television whose credits included James Bond films and his contributions to Superman (1978) and the television series Hart to Hart. He was the son of Joseph Mankiewicz and nephew of Herman Mankiewicz. He is not related to the similarly named Wolf Mankowitz who worked on the first James Bond film, uncredited.

== Early life and career ==
Mankiewicz was born in Los Angeles on June 1, 1942. His parents were Austrian-born actress Rose Stradner and the celebrated screenwriter/director Joseph L. Mankiewicz, son of German-Jewish immigrants. In 1950, his father, after winning four Oscars in two years for the screenplays and direction of A Letter to Three Wives and All About Eve, decided to move his family back to New York City, where he had been raised.

Mankiewicz was a graduate of Phillips Exeter Academy (1955–1959) and Yale College (1959–1963). He majored in drama at Yale, completing the first two years of the Yale Drama School while still an undergraduate. His mother committed suicide in 1958, when Mankiewicz was 16 years old.

During vacations he worked at the Williamstown Summer Theater in Massachusetts both in production and as an actor. In 1961, he was hired as a third assistant director on The Comancheros, a film starring John Wayne and Lee Marvin, which was shot in the Monument Valley of Utah, the last film directed by Michael Curtiz. Wayne told Mankiewicz to remove his John F. Kennedy button.

In 1963, two young producers, Stuart Millar and Lawrence Turman, took Mankiewicz on as their assistant while making The Best Man, the 1964 film version of Gore Vidal's Broadway play starring Henry Fonda. He was involved in virtually every aspect of the film, receiving his first on-screen credit as "Production Associate."

=== Screenwriter ===
Mankiewicz began to write, finishing an original screenplay, Please, about the last ninety minutes in the life of a suicidal young actress. It was optioned at times by three different studios, never made, but served as an example of his talent and was responsible for his first writing assignment, an episode of Bob Hope Presents the Chrysler Theatre, directed by Stuart Rosenberg. He received a credit as "Thomas F. Mankiewicz", but thought it looked so pretentious on the screen he became Tom Mankiewicz for the rest of his career.

Mankiewicz later recalled:

There was something terribly frightening about writing a screenplay when you have the last name of Mankiewicz. You say to yourself, 'Oh, sh*t, no matter what I write, it sure ain't any All About Eve, is it?' It takes a long time to get over that. When I first came out here, everybody said, 'Give my regards to your old man, will you, and by the way, if there's anything I can do for you ___ ' On the one hand, all of that is very nice and tremendously advantageous. On the other hand, it sort of robs you of any sense of achievement. It's a real double-edged sword. And it wasn't until I had been asked back several times and, as awful as it sounds, for a lot of money, that I could finally convince myself that these people really want me because they think that I'm the best person to write the script.

In 1967, Mankiewicz joined forces with a friend, Jack Haley Jr. to come up with a musical television special tailored for the then hugely popular Nancy Sinatra: Movin' with Nancy, co-starring Frank Sinatra, Dean Martin, Sammy Davis Jr. and Lee Hazlewood. Mankiewicz was the sole writer and Haley won the Emmy for directing. This was followed by The Beat of the Brass, starring Herb Alpert and the Tijuana Brass in 1968.

Simultaneously, 20th Century Fox had optioned his original screenplay and after reading it, producer Joe Pasternak hired him to write The Sweet Ride about the California surfing community, starring Tony Franciosa, Bob Denver, and introducing Jacqueline Bisset.

The combination of that screenplay and the TV specials led Broadway producer Fred Coe to ask Mankiewicz to write the book for Georgy, the musical version of the film Georgy Girl. It opened at the Winter Garden Theatre in 1970, was nominated for three Tony Awards, but closed after four performances.

=== James Bond ===
Attending one of the four performances of Georgy was United Artists production head David Picker, who admired Mankiewicz's book for the musical. Picker and James Bond producer Albert "Cubby" Broccoli were looking for a writer to do a major reworking of Diamonds Are Forever in hopes of luring Sean Connery back to play Bond. Picker suggested that Broccoli add Mankiewicz to his list of possibles. He was hired on a two-week guarantee, stayed on the film for six months and received shared screenplay credit with the original writer, Richard Maibaum.

This began a long relationship with the Bond films. Mankiewicz received sole writing credit on the next, Live and Let Die, shared credit with Maibaum on The Man with the Golden Gun, did an uncredited rewrite on The Spy Who Loved Me, and helped Broccoli and director Lewis Gilbert get Moonraker off the ground.

=== Script doctor ===
In 1975, Mankiewicz wrote the screenplay for Mother, Jugs and Speed, a dark comedy about ambulance drivers starring Bill Cosby, Raquel Welch and Harvey Keitel. He co-produced the film with director Peter Yates who later asked Mankiewicz to come to the British Virgin Islands to do a major rewrite on Yates’ next film, The Deep, with Robert Shaw and Jacqueline Bisset. The film was a huge box office success and cemented Mankiewicz's reputation as a "script doctor."

He next performed a similar function on The Cassandra Crossing, starring Richard Harris, Sophia Loren, Burt Lancaster and Ava Gardner, receiving shared screenplay credit. This was followed by his screenplay for The Eagle Has Landed, a World War II thriller with Michael Caine, Donald Sutherland and Robert Duvall.

During this time actor Peter Falk asked Universal Studios to hire Mankiewicz to read the scripts for his television series, Columbo, and make plot suggestions. He was paid a consulting fee on each episode for an entire season while performing no actual writing services.

Mankiewicz later admitted being a script doctor was seductive. "It's one of the few times when the writer has a certain control over a film, because you're coming in when the people on the film are at their most insecure", he said. "After all, if you're there, they've had to admit that they needed someone there to help them out. ... You're coming in like Jack Palance in Shane. You're the hired gun. Everyone is waiting for a revelation. You're supposed to bring better parts for the actors, better scenes for the director. And sometimes, everyone likes it, not because it's necessarily better, but just because it's different."

=== Superman ===
In 1977, director Richard Donner was hired to direct the films Superman and Superman II. At the time the script drafts combined were more than four hundred pages long (an impossible length to shoot) and Donner felt they were much too campy as well. He brought Mankiewicz aboard to do a complete overhaul in terms of length, dialogue and tone. Mankiewicz stayed on the production for more than a year, assisting Donner in other departments as well. Donner gave Mankiewicz a separate credit in the main title sequence: "Creative Consultant." The Writer's Guild strenuously objected on two grounds; first, that the traditional script arbitration process was being bypassed and second, that Mankiewicz's credit came after the original screenwriters and not before them, implying that his contribution was more important. The dispute went to a legal hearing. Mankiewicz won. His credit remained where it was on Superman, but he agreed to have it come just before the listed screenwriters on Superman II.

By this stage Mankiewicz was very successful. He later said, "I wanted to be able to say to my father, 'Listen, I've got my own area over here. This is my part of the yard, and you don't do this kind of thing. Maybe I'll do one of yours someday, but I don't need any money, thank you very much. I'm standing right here on my own.' That gives you a kind of confidence and security. I think I've got my own identity, and I've established a good base camp."

=== Hart to Hart ===
During this time, television producers Aaron Spelling and Leonard Goldberg had five successful series on the ABC Network simultaneously. They also had a potential "pilot" script by Sidney Sheldon called Double Twist which they were unable to sell. Goldberg knew Mankiewicz wanted to direct and told him if he rewrote the two-hour script successfully he could direct it. Mankiewicz agreed and turned it into Hart to Hart. It sold. He co-wrote and directed the pilot, starring Robert Wagner and Stefanie Powers. The hit series ran for five years and later was the subject of eight two-hour network and cable films. Mankiewicz received his "Creative Consultant" credit on each episode, while directing seven of them. He also directed the final cable film, Till Death Do Us Hart, in Munich, Germany, coming full circle on the show.

=== Script doctor ===
Following Superman, Warner Bros. signed Mankiewicz to an exclusive deal and kept him busy "fixing" films. He wrote scenes for Steven Spielberg and Joe Dante's Gremlins, Spielberg and Richard Donner's The Goonies and John Badham's WarGames. He next wrote the first draft of Batman, the opening film for that successful series, although Mankiewicz's draft was never used. He created a TV series, Gavilan, and wrote a script for Clint Eastwood, Rainbow.

Then Richard Donner brought him onto Ladyhawke, the medieval romantic fantasy starring Matthew Broderick, Michelle Pfeiffer, and Rutger Hauer. He received shared screenplay credit and a separate credit as "Creative Consultant."

Mankiewicz next co-executive produced the film Hot Pursuit with John Cusack and Ben Stiller.

Tom Mankiewicz once admitted, "I think Dad is probably disappointed that I have not worked up to what he considers to be, and I must say I consider to be, my creative potential. He's never said he's disappointed, but I know he is, and I know that come Oscar night some year, he would love to see some wonderful film that I wrote and directed being honored."

Joseph Mankiewicz concurred:

I do share Tom's disappointment. Or put it this way. He came to share my disappointment. On the other hand, I understand completely. I wrote for W. C. Fields. I wrote Westerns. I wrote anything when I started out. The point is, Tom sold his stuff. Now I happen to think he's better than that. Tom found it a little too easy. Instead of shooting the fourth draft of his screenplay, they shot the second. I have said to him, 'I don't think the second draft is good enough, Tom. You can do better.' But he didn't have to do better, and that was a pity. You see, Tom didn't have sitting on his tail half a dozen very good producers.

=== Later career ===
Mankiewicz was unhappy at Warner Bros and he decided to move over to Universal. "The last thing I wanted to do was make another deal that cast me as a fixer", he said. "And Frank Price, who was then running production, agreed totally. So after two weeks here, Frank asked me to do a rewrite on the Dragnet script!" Things worked out well for Mankiewicz, who got along well with co-writers Dan Aykroyd and Alan Zweibel and wound up directing Dragnet. It was one of the top grossers of 1987, and marked his feature debut as director.

Mankiewicz next did an uncredited rewrite on Legal Eagles, a romantic comedy with Robert Redford and Debra Winger. He then directed the film Delirious, starring John Candy and Mariel Hemingway. Next, he directed the season's opening episode of HBO's Tales from the Crypt. This was followed by his directing the Showtime film, Taking the Heat, with Alan Arkin, Peter Boyle, George Segal and Tony Goldwyn.

Mankiewicz's career slowed down in the 1990s. He later claimed he had been unofficially blacklisted when he left his agency, CAA.

"When things are going well, you can get lazy with the best of intentions", said Mankiewicz. "If you can make a very good living writing James Bond and God knows there's nothing wrong with it, people love the pictures and the money is good – then when somebody asks if you want to do another one, the easy thing to do is to take it. When I started out, I sort of thought of myself as an enormously sensitive young writer who wanted to do these deeply personal films. I don't know how many years ago that was. But I still intend to be."

Mankiewicz admitted he had not fulfilled his potential. "It's been my fault, really. Perhaps in the beginning, I was intimidated by my family and its reputation... I think I've done good, solid work. I don't apologize for anything I've done. But I wonder if I've aimed."

Later, Mankiewicz helped Richard Donner reconstruct Donner's version of Superman II, restoring all of the original footage he had shot that had been altered or replaced by the producers, including multiple sequences with Marlon Brando which were seen by the public for the first time. Superman II: The Richard Donner Cut came out in 2006 and won the Saturn Award as the best DVD of the year.

== Other pursuits ==
In 2006, The Dodge College of Film and Media Arts at Chapman University invited Mankiewicz to be their "Film Maker in Residence." He stayed on as a trustee professor, teaching a course in filmmaking to their graduate students.

Mankiewicz had a home in Kenya for eight years. He served on the board of directors of the William Holden Wildlife Foundation, based there. He was also closely involved with the Los Angeles Zoo, and was chairman of the board of trustees of the Greater Los Angeles Zoo Association.

He was an owner of thoroughbred race horses, having first partnered with actor Robert Wagner, then with A&M Records co-founder Jerry Moss, and later racing under his own silks. He was a past member of the board of directors of the Thoroughbred Owners of California.

Mankiewicz remained active in the Writer's and Director's Guilds and was a former member of the board of governors of the Motion Picture Academy of Arts and Sciences.

== Death ==
Mankiewicz died at his home in Los Angeles from pancreatic cancer on July 31, 2010.

== Autobiography ==
In May 2012, My Life as a Mankiewicz was published. Written in collaboration with Robert Crane, the book was largely completed at the time of his death, but finished by Crane and published by the University Press of Kentucky.

In his book, Mankiewicz claimed he lost his virginity to Joan O'Brien while making The Comancheros. He also had affairs with actresses Dorothy Provine, Suzy Kendall, Carol Lynley, Tuesday Weld, Diane Cilento, Elizabeth Ashley, Jean Simmons, Kate Jackson, Stefanie Powers and Margot Kidder. He was also a very close friend to Natalie Wood and Jerry Moss.

== Filmography ==
=== Film ===
Year	Title	Director	Writer	Notes
1968	The Sweet Ride	No	Yes	
1971	Diamonds Are Forever	No	Yes	
1973	Live and Let Die	No	Yes	
1974	The Man with the Golden Gun	No	Yes	
1976	Mother, Jugs and Speed	No	Yes	Also producer
1976	The Cassandra Crossing	No	Yes	
1976	The Eagle Has Landed	No	Yes	
1985	Ladyhawke	No	Yes	Also consultant
1987	Dragnet	Yes	Yes	
1991	Delirious	Yes	No	

Uncredited writer

- The Spy Who Loved Me (1977)
- The Deep (1977)
- Moonraker (1979)
- WarGames (1983)
- Gremlins (1984)
- City Heat (1984)
- Legal Eagles (1986)

Creative consultant

- Superman (1978)
- Superman II (1980)

Executive producer

- Hot Pursuit (1987)

=== Television ===
Year	Title	Director	Writer	Notes
1967	Bob Hope Presents the Chrysler Theatre	No	Yes	Episode "Runaway Bay"
1967	Movin' With Nancy	No	Yes	TV special
1968	The Beat of the Brass	No	Yes	
1978	Mother, Jugs & Speed	No	Yes	
1979–1984	Hart to Hart	Yes	Yes	Also creative consultant and contributing writer
1982	Gavilan	No	Yes	Also creator and contributing writer
1991	Tales from the Crypt	Yes	No	Episode "Loved to Death"
1993	Taking the Heat	Yes	No	TV movie
1996	Hart to Hart: Till Death Do Us Hart	Yes	No	

Co-producer

- Livin' Large (1989) (TV movie)

== Theatre ==
- Georgy (1970) – Book

== Books ==
- My Life as a Mankiewicz: An Insider's Journey Through Hollywood (with Robert Crane) Publisher: University Press of Kentucky (2012). ISBN 9780813140575

== Unfilmed screenplays ==
- Please
- Mothers and Daughters (1964) – from the book by Evan Hunter
- Past All Dishonour (1965) – from novel by James M. Cain – a partnership with Robert Wagner
- M. 38 (1966) – a suspense comedy for producer Harry Keller
- Austin David (1970) from novel by Giles Tippette for producer Quinn Martin
- The Farm from novel by Sylvia Wallace about a fat farm
- draft of Batman (1981) – for Peter Guber and Jon Peters
- Rainbow (1980s) – about a con man in the Depression
- The Practice (1985) – medical thriller
- remake of Miracle on 34th Street (1987) for Mankiewicz to direct from script by Nell Cuthbert
- Skin Tight – (early 1990s) with Burt Reynolds from novel by Carl Hiaasen
