= List of LGBTQ-related films of 1995 =

This is a list of lesbian, gay, bisexual, transgender or queer-related films released in 1995. It contains theatrically released films that deal with important gay, lesbian, bisexual, transgender or queer characters or issues and may have same-sex romance or relationships as a plot device.

== Films ==
Title	Director	Country	Genre	Cast	Notes
Antonia's Line	Marleen Gorris	Netherlands	Comedy, drama	Willeke van Ammelrooy, Els Dottermans, Jan Decleir, Victor Löw, Johan Heldenbergh, Dora van der Groen, Veerle van Overloop, Esther Vriesendorp, Carolien Spoor, Thyrza Ravesteijn, Mil Seghers, Elsie de Brauw, Reinout Bussemaker, Marina de Graaf, Jan Steen, Catherine ten Bruggencate and Paul Kooij	Won Academy Award for Best foreign language film"
An Awfully Big Adventure	Mike Newell	United Kingdom	Comedy, drama	Alan Rickman, Hugh Grant, Georgina Cates	Based on the novel of the same name by Beryl Bainbridge
Bent Out of Shape	Orla Walsh	Ireland	Short, drama	Paul Batt, Dawn Bradfield, Karl Byrne, Siobhan Carmody, Helen Casey, Kate Cleary, Stuart Dannell-Foran, Donna Dingle, Oisin the Dog, Gerry English, Tony Flynn, Matthew Griffin, Jo Halpin (credited as Joanne Halpin), Brent Hearne (credited as Breant Hearne) and Gemma Hill	
Black is... Black Ain't	Marlon Riggs	United States	Documentary	Cornel West, bell hooks, Angela Davis	
BloodSisters: Leather, Dykes and Sadomasochism	Michelle Handelman	United States	Documentary	Skeeter, Pat Califia, Tala Brandeis, Tova Seawall, Donna Shrout, Queen Cougar, JC Collins, Wickie Stamps	
Boys on the Side	Herbert Ross	United States; France	Comedy, drama	Whoopi Goldberg, Mary-Louise Parker, Drew Barrymore, Matthew McConaughey, James Remar, Billy Wirth, Anita Gillette, Dennis Boutsikaris, Estelle Parsons and Amy Aquino	Ross' final directorial effort
Bugis Street	Yonfan	Singapore; Hong Kong	Drama	Hiep Thi Le, Michael Lam, Greg-O, Ernest Seah, David Knight, Maggie Lye, Gerald Chen, Mavia, Sofia, Linden, Lily Siew Lin Ong (credited as Lily Ong), Matthew Foo, Benedict Goh, Gerald Chen, Matthew Foo, Godfrey Yew, Charles, Kelvin Lua, Sharon Chua, Jimmy Newton-Lim, Anthony Yeo, Anuar and Sim Wen Chiat	Historically accurate film, about the lives of Singaporean transvestites.
Butterfly Kiss	Michael Winterbottom	United Kingdom	Drama	Amanda Plummer, Saskia Reeves, Kathy Jamieson, Des McAleer, Lisa Riley, Freda Dowie, Paula Tilbrook, Fine Time Fontayne, Joanne Cook, Elizabeth McGrath, Shirley Vaughan, Paul Bown, Emily Aston, Ricky Tomlinson, Katy Murphy, Adele Lawson, Jeffrey Longmore, Suzy Yannis and Julie Walker	
Carrington	Christopher Hampton	United Kingdom; France	Drama	Emma Thompson, Jonathan Pryce, Steven Waddington, Samuel West, Rufus Sewell, Penelope Wilton, Janet McTeer, Peter Blythe, Jeremy Northam, Alex Kingston, Sebastian Harcombe, Richard Clifford, David Ryall, Stephen Boxer and Annabel Mullion	Biopic of English painter Dora Carrington
The Celluloid Closet	Rob Epstein, Jeffrey Friedman	France; United Kingdom; Germany; United States	Documentary	Lily Tomlin (narrator), Interviewees; Jay Presson Allen, Susie Bright, Quentin Crisp, Tony Curtis, Richard Dyer, Arthur Laurents, Armistead Maupin, Whoopi Goldberg, Jan Oxenberg, Harvey Fierstein, Gore Vidal, Farley Granger, Paul Rudnick, Shirley MacLaine, Barry Sandler, Mart Crowley, Antonio Fargas, Tom Hanks, Ron Nyswaner, Daniel Melnick, Harry Hamlin, John Schlesinger, Susan Sarandon and Stewart Stern	It won a Peabody Award in 1996.
Clueless	Amy Heckerling	United States	Comedy	Alicia Silverstone, Stacey Dash, Brittany Murphy, Paul Rudd, Dan Hedaya, Elisa Donovan, Justin Walker, Wallace Shawn	
Costa Brava	Marta Balletbò-Coll	Spain	Drama	Desi del Valle, Marta Balletbò-Coll, Montserrat Gausachs, Joseph Maria Brugues, Ramón Marí, Sergi Schaaff, Marel Malaret, Marta Martí-Palanqués, Emil Remolins Casas, Luz Marina Reyes Peiro, Anna Casella, Fernando Pérez, Maria Angli, Jackson Addai and Ricard Simo	
The Doom Generation	Gregg Araki	United States	Comedy, crime, drama	James Duval, Rose McGowan, Johnathon Schaech, Dustin Nguyen, Margaret Cho, Parker Posey, Lauren Tewes, Christopher Knight, Nicky Katt, Amanda Bearse, Cress Williams, Perry Farrell, Heidi Fleiss, Khristofor Rossianov and (Band) Skinny Puppy	
Fiction and Other Truths: A Film About Jane Rule	Lynne Fernie, Aerlyn Weissman	Canada	Documentary	Jane Rule	
Flirt	Hal Hartley	United States; Germany; Japan	Drama	Martin Donovan, Dwight Ewell, Geno Lechner, Parker Posey, Bill Sage, Miho Nikaido, Hal Hartley, Toshizo Fujiwara, Peter Fitz, Chikako Hara, Liana Pai, Harold Perrineau, Jr., Maria Schrader, José Zuñiga and Hannah Sullivan	
French Twist	Josiane Balasko	France	Comedy	Victoria Abril, Josiane Balasko, Alain Chabat, Ticky Holgado, Catherine Hiegel, Michèle Bernier, Catherine Samie, Katrine Boorman, Miguel Bosé and Blanca Li	a.k.a. Gazon maudit
Frisk	Todd Verow	United States	Drama	Michael Gunther, Craig Chester, Michael Stock, Raoul O'Connell, Jaie Laplante, Parker Posey, James Lyons, Alexis Arquette, Michael Waite, Alyssa Wendt, Mark Ewert, Dustin Schell, Michael Wilson, Paul B. Riley and Donald Mosner	Based on the novel of the same name by Dennis Cooper
Gonin	Takashi Ishii	Japan	Crime, drama	Kōichi Satō, Masahiro Motoki, Jinpachi Nezu, Kippei Shiina, Naoto Takenaka, Megumi Yokoyama, Eiko Nagashima, Maiko Kawakami, Hideo Murota, Kazuya Kimura, Shingo Tsurumi, Toshiyuki Nagashima and Takeshi Kitano	a.k.a. "The Five"
Headless Body in Topless Bar	James Bruce	United States	Black comedy, psychological horror	Raymond J. Barry	
Higher Learning	John Singleton	United States	Comedy, drama	Jennifer Connelly, Robert Downey Jr., Omar Epps, Michael Rapaport, Laurence Fishburne, Ice Cube	
Home for the Holidays	Jodie Foster	United States	Drama	Holly Hunter, Robert Downey Jr., Anne Bancroft, Charles Durning, Dylan McDermott, Steve Guttenberg, Cynthia Stevenson, Claire Danes, Austin Pendleton, and David Strathairn	
Hotel y domicilio	Ernesto Del Río	Spain	Drama, thriller	Jorge Sanz, Santiago Ramos, Enrique San Francisco, Anabel Alonso, Ramón Barea, Joseba Apaolaza, José Manuel Cervino, Ramón Agirre, Jox Berasategui (credited as Jose Mª Berasategi), Ion Gabella, Saturnino García, Maite Díaz, Txema Blasco, Luis Marías and Ricardo Franco	
The Incredibly True Adventure of Two Girls in Love	Maria Maggenti	United States	Romance, comedy, drama	Laurel Holloman, Nicole Ari Parker, Maggie Moore, Kate Stafford, Sabrina Artel, Nelson Rodríguez, Dale Dickey, Katlin Tyler, Anna Padgett, Chelsea Cattouse, John Elsen, Stephanie Berry, Toby Poser, Andrew Wright, Babs Davy, Lillian Kiesler and Maryette Charlton	
Jeffrey	Christopher Ashley	United States	Comedy, drama	Steven Weber, Michael T. Weiss, Patrick Stewart, Bryan Batt, Christine Baranski, Victor Garber, Camryn Manheim, Sigourney Weaver, Kathy Najimy, Ethan Phillips, Debra Monk, Peter Maloney, Michele Pawk, Nathan Lane, Olympia Dukakis, Gregory Jbara and Kevin Nealon	Based on the play of the same name by Paul Rudnick.
Kommt Mausi raus?!	Alexander Scherer, Angelina Maccarone	Germany	Drama, comedy, romance	Julia Richter, Nina Weniger, Alexandra Wilcke, Gisela Keiner, Inga Busch, Konstantin Graudus, Florian Lukas, Florian Fitz, Kerstin Thielemann (credited as Kerstin Becker), Hildegard Kuhlenberg, Caroline Ebner, Jan Georg Schütte (credited as Jan Schütte), Nicole Hoika, Christiane Lemm and Walter Spiske	a.k.a. "Is Mausi Coming Out?"
Lie Down With Dogs	Wally White	United States	Romance, comedy	Wally White, Bash Halow, James Sexton, Darren Dryden, Randy Becker, Wendy Adams, Michel Richoz, Marti Cooney (credited as Martha J. Cooney), Benjamin Bailey, Ty-Ranne Grimstad, David Matwijkow and Tim McCarthy	
Like Grains of Sand	Ryōsuke Hashiguchi	Japan	Drama	Yoshinori Okada, Ayumi Hamasaki, Kōji Yamaguchi, Kumi Takada, Shizuka Isami, Kōta Kusano and Yoshihiko Hakamada	
Man of the Year	Dirk Shafer	United States	Mockumentary	Dirk Shafer	
Men Men Men	Christian De Sica	Italy	Comedy	Christian De Sica	
Marching in Darkness	Massimo Spano	Italy	Drama	Thomas Kretschmann, Flavio Albanese, Jean-Marc Barr, Massimo Dapporto, Ottavia Piccolo, Nicola Russo, Roberto Citran, Mariella Valentini, Emilio Bonucci, Franco Interlenghi, Bruno Corazzari, Antonella Fattori, Giorgio Crisafi, Fabrizio Pioda, Lorenzo Di Pasqua, Gabriella Saitta, Riccardo Babbi, Mattia Sbragia and Maximilian Nisi	a.k.a. Marciando nel buio
Menmaniacs – The Legacy of Leather	Jochen Hick	Germany; United States	Documentary	Thomas Karasch (Mr. Leather Europe), Hans Gerd Mertens, Michael Pereyra, Kelly Regis, Marcus Hernandez and Chuck Renslow	Includes the International Mr. Leather and the Mr. Drummer elections.
The Midwife's Tale	Megan Siler	United States	Romance	Stacey Havener, Gayle Cohen, Carla Milford, Anthony Shaw Abaté, Ben Prager, Mitchell Anderson, Antonia Kitto, Kathleen Turco-Lyon, Delbert Spain, Jeanne Bascom, Keith Green, Heather Newville, Paul W. Lancraft, Amy Resnick and Mark Lawrence	
Other Voices, Other Rooms	David Rocksavage	United States; United Kingdom	Drama	Lothaire Bluteau, Anna Levine (credited as Anna Thomson), David Speck, April Turner, Frank Hoyt Taylor (credited as Frank Taylor), Leonard Watkins, Aubrey Dollar, Liz Byler (credited as Elizabeth Byler), Moses Gibson, Terri Dollar, Jayne Morgan, Brian Moeller, Lonnie Hamilton, Yamilet Hidalgo (credited as Yami Hildago) and Wayne Caparas	
Parallel Sons	John G. Young	United States	Romance, drama	Gabriel Mann, Laurence Mason, Murphy Guyer, Graham Alex Johnson, Heather Gottlieb, Josh Hopkins, Maureen Shannon, Julia Weldon and Eric Granger	
Rude	Clement Virgo	Canada	Crime, drama	Maurice Dean Wint	
Sebastian	Svend Wam	Norway; Sweden	Drama	Hampus Björck, Nicolai Cleve Broch, Ewa Fröling, Helge Jordal, Rebecka Hemse, Lena Olander, Emil Lindroth, Karin Hagås, Mira Mandoki, Stig Torstensson, Sara Alström, Johanna Sällström and Bård Torgersen	
Serving in Silence: The Margarethe Cammermeyer Story	Jeff Bleckner	United States	Drama	Glenn Close, Judy Davis, Jan Rubeš, Wendy Makkena, Mary Newcombe, Susan Barnes, Eric Dane and Ryan Reynolds	Made-for-television movie.
Showgirls	Paul Verhoeven	United States; France	Drama	Elizabeth Berkley, Kyle MacLachlan, Gina Gershon, Glenn Plummer, Robert Davi, Alan Rachins, Gina Ravera, Lin Tucci, Greg Travis, Al Ruscio, Patrick Bristow, William Shockley, Michelle Johnston, Pamela Anderson, Dewey Weber, Rena Riffel, Melissa Williams, Ungela Brockman, Melinda Songer, Bobbie Phillips and Carrie Ann Inaba	
Skin Deep	Midi Onodera	Canada	Drama	Natsuko Ohama, Melanie Nicholls-King, Keram Malicki-Sánchez	
Stonewall	Nigel Finch	United Kingdom	Comedy, drama	Guillermo Díaz, Frederick Weller, Brendan Corbalis, Duane Boutte, Bruce MacVittie, Peter Ratray, Dwight Ewell, Matthew Faber, Michael McElroy, Luis Guzmán and Joey Dedio	
To Wong Foo, Thanks for Everything! Julie Newmar	Beeban Kidron	United States	Comedy	Wesley Snipes, Patrick Swayze, John Leguizamo, Stockard Channing, Blythe Danner, Arliss Howard, Jason London, Chris Penn, Melinda Dillon, Beth Grant, Alice Drummond, Michael Vartan, Jennifer Milmore, Julie Newmar, Naomi Campbell, Joseph Arias, Lady Catiria, Alexander Heimberg, Candis Cayne (credited as Brendan McDanniel), Clinton Leupp, Steven Polito, Jon Ingle, Quentin Crisp, José Sarria, RuPaul and Robin Williams	
Total Eclipse	Agnieszka Holland	United Kingdom; France; Belgium; Italy	Romance, drama	Leonardo DiCaprio, David Thewlis, Romane Bohringer, Dominique Blanc, Felicie Pasotti Cabarbaye, Nita Klein, James Thiérrée, Emmanuelle Oppo, Denise Chalem, Andrzej Seweryn, Christopher Thompson, Bruce Van Barthold, Christopher Chaplin, Christopher Hampton and Mathias Jung	Screenplay by Christopher Hampton, based on his stage play of the same name
Victor/Victoria	Blake Edwards	United States	Musical	Julie Andrews, Tony Roberts, Michael Nouri	Broadcast on Japanese channel NHK
When Night Is Falling	Patricia Rozema	Canada	Romance, drama	Pascale Bussières, Rachael Crawford, Henry Czerny, David Fox, Don McKellar, Tracy Wright, Clare Coulter, Karyne Steben, Sarah Steben, Jonathan Potts, Tom Melissis, Stuart Clow, Richard W. Farrell (credited as Richard Farrell), Fides Krucker and Thom Sokoloski	
Wigstock: The Movie	Barry Shils	Germany; United States	Documentary	Performers; RuPaul, Crystal Waters, Deee-Lite, Jackie Beat, Debbie Harry, Leigh Bowery, Joey Arias, Alexis Arquette and the Dueling Bankheads (David Ilku and Clark Render)	Covers a drag festival held on Labor Day every year in Manhattan.
Wild Side	Donald Cammell	United States	Action, thriller	Anne Heche, Christopher Walken, Joan Chen, Steven Bauer, Allen Garfield, Adam Novak, Marcus Aurelius, Michael Rose, Lewis Arquette and Candace Kita	
