= Death in Paradise (disambiguation) =

Death in Paradise is a British-French crime drama set on the fictional Caribbean island of Saint-Marie.

Death in Paradise may also refer to the following:

- A series of novels, based on the show; see Death in Paradise § Novels
- Death in Paradise (novel), a 2001 novel by Robert B. Parker
  - Jesse Stone: Death in Paradise, a 2006 TV film based on the novel
- "Death in Paradise", the 1997 pilot episode of New Zealand crime drama series Duggan
