= Brian Turk =

American film and television actor

- Born: May 29, 1970; Northglenn, Colorado, U.S.
- Died: September 13, 2019 (aged 49); Orange, California, U.S.
- Occupations: Film and television actor

Brian Turk (May 29, 1970 – September 13, 2019) was an American film and television actor. He was best known for playing Gabriel, a carnival strongman in the American dark fantasy television series Carnivàle.

== Life and career ==
Turk was born in Northglenn, Colorado. He began his screen career in 1993, appearing in the ABC sitcom television series Step By Step. In 1994, he appeared in the television programs Wings, Weird Science and Saved by the Bell: The New Class.

Later in his career, in 2003, Turk starred as Gabriel, a carnival strongman in the HBO dark fantasy television series Carnivàle, starring along with Michael J. Anderson, Adrienne Barbeau, Patrick Bauchau, Clancy Brown, Debra Christofferson and Tim DeKay. After the series ended in 2005, he guest-starred in television programs including Beverly Hills, 90210, Two and a Half Men, ER, Buffy the Vampire Slayer and Boy Meets World. In 2008, he played Bo Crowell in the ABC soap opera television series General Hospital. He also appeared in films such as Murder of a Cat (as Dave Calvetti), Crocodile Dundee in Los Angeles, Big Fat Liar, The Lost World: Jurassic Park.

Turk retired from acting in 2017, last appearing in the CBS police procedural television series NCIS.

== Death ==
Turk died from complications of brain cancer on September 13, 2019, in Orange, California, at the age of 49.
