= Night Passage =

Night Passage may refer to:

- Night Passage (film), a 1957 western film starring James Stewart and Audie Murphy
- Night Passage (album), Weather Report's tenth album, released in 1980
- Night Passage (opera), a 1994 work by Robert Moran
- Night Passage (novel), one of the Jesse Stone novels written by Robert B. Parker
- "Night Passage", a short story by Fritz Leiber
