= Preaching to the Choir =

- Directed by: Charles Randolph-Wright
- Written by: Kevin Hefferman; Peter E. Lengyel
- Produced by: Peter E. Lengyel; Richard Perello
- Starring: Billoah Greene; Darien Sills-Evans; Novella Nelson; Janine Green; Rosa Arredondo; Eartha Kitt; Tichina Arnold; Adewale Akinnuoye-Agbaje
- Cinematography: Robert Barocci
- Edited by: Melody London; Jaycob Craycroft
- Music by: Nona Hendryx
- Production companies: CodeBlack Entertainment; Catalan Films; TV One; Radio One
- Distributed by: Freestyle Releasing
- Release date: April 14, 2006
- Running time: 105 minutes
- Country: United States
- Language: English

Preaching to the Choir is a 2006 American musical comedy-drama film directed by Charles Randolph-Wright and starring Billoah Greene, Darien Sills-Evans, Novella Nelson, Janine Green, Rosa Arredondo, Eartha Kitt, Tichina Arnold and Adewale Akinnuoye-Agbaje.

== Cast ==
- Billoah Greene as Teshawn
- Darien Sills-Evans as Wesley
- Adewale Akinnuoye-Agbaje as Bull Sharky
- Janine Green as Kia
- Novella Nelson as Aunt June
- Tuffy Questell as Stumpy
- Eartha Kitt as Sister Nettie
- Patti LaBelle as Sister Jasmine
- Rosa Arredondo as Rachel
- Tichina Arnold as Desiree
- Tim Reid as Prophet

== Release ==
The film was released on April 14, 2006.

== Reception ==
The film has a 36% rating on Rotten Tomatoes based on fourteen reviews.

John Anderson of Variety gave the film a positive review and wrote, "Despite the ungainly script and direction, the climactic performances — including one by young singer Anny Jules –absolve the movie of most of its sins."

Bruce Westbrook of the Houston Chronicle also gave the film a positive review and wrote, "Nor does it sermonize at the expense of entertaining. Instead, it melds gospel and hip-hop for a music-driven tale of twin brothers who reconnect."
