= Jesse Stone: Death in Paradise =

- DVD cover
- Genre: Crime film
- Based on: Death in Paradise by Robert B. Parker
- Screenplay by: J.T. Allen; Tom Selleck; Michael Brandman
- Directed by: Robert Harmon
- Starring: Tom Selleck; Viola Davis; Kohl Sudduth
- Music by: Jeff Beal
- Country of origin: United States
- Original language: English

Production
- Producer: Steven J. Brandman
- Cinematography: David Gribble
- Editor: Chris Peppe
- Running time: 87 minutes
- Production companies: Brandman Productions; Sony Pictures Television

Original release
- Network: CBS
- Release: April 30, 2006

Jesse Stone: Death in Paradise is a 2006 American made-for-television crime film directed by Robert Harmon and starring Tom Selleck, Viola Davis, and Kohl Sudduth. Based on the 2001 novel Death in Paradise by Robert B. Parker, the film is about a small town police chief and struggling alcoholic who investigates the murder of a teenage girl whose body is found floating in a lake. The case brings the former LAPD homicide detective into the affluent world of a bestselling writer who exploits troubled teens, and the violent world of a Boston mobster. Filmed on location in Nova Scotia, the story is set in the fictitious town of Paradise, Massachusetts.

Jesse Stone: Death in Paradise is the third in a series of nine television films based on Parker's Jesse Stone novels. The film first aired on the CBS television network April 30, 2006.

== Plot ==
In the small town of Paradise, Massachusetts, Chief of police Jesse Stone and his men investigate the death of teenage girl found floating in a lake. Officer Luther "Suitcase" Simpson discovers a high school ring bearing the initials "HR". In the coming days, Jesse is haunted by disturbing dreams about the girl's murder. Since moving to Paradise, his private life involves drinking alone at his isolated house on the water with his dog Reggie looking on, occasionally talking on the phone with his ex-wife in California. Forced to resign from the LAPD for a drinking problem that began following his divorce, Jesse is still in contact with his ex-wife Jenn, who calls him regularly. Concerned about his drinking, she convinces him to see psychiatrist Dr. Dix, a former detective and recovering alcoholic himself. Following his first session, Jesse visits the grave of his former girlfriend, Abby Taylor, for whose death he still feels deeply responsible.

State homicide commander Captain Healy delivers his autopsy report to Jesse, who learns that the girl drowned, and alcohol and muscle relaxer were found in her blood. The fourteen-year-old girl was probably in the water for three weeks, and was pregnant. Soon after, Jesse goes to the high school and meets with headmistress Dr. Lilly Summers, who identifies the owner of the ring, William Hooker Royce, an all-American athlete at the school. Later, when asked about the ring, Hooker tells Jesse that he briefly dated a girl named Billie Bishop and had given her his ring when he broke up with her. Jesse returns to the school and learns from Lilly that Billie was a former A-student before coming to Paradise two years earlier when something changed her. He visits her parents and learns that she was thrown out of her home following a dramatic change in her behavior and academic performance. In the coming days Jesse and Dr. Summers become involved romantically.

While working to solve Billie's murder, Jesse deals with a domestic violence case involving Jerry Snyder, a loser who enjoys viciously beating his wife. Jesse and officer Molly Crane try to convince Mrs. Snyder to leave her husband and she eventually does. Meanwhile, Jesse's investigation leads him to Sister Mary John, a Catholic nun who runs the shelter where Billie sought refuge. Sister Mary provides Jesse with a phone number that Billie gave her in case of an emergency. Jesse soon dismisses Hooker as a suspect and turns his investigational focus on local writer Norman Shaw, a well-connected citizen with ties to the Boston mob, as the prime suspect. It was his phone number that Billie provided to the Sister Mary. Shaw purportedly has a predilection for young girls.

Jesse and Luther pay a visit to Norman Shaw who is hosting a fundraising party with influential politicians and prominent citizens. Afterwards, Jesse learns from Captain Healey that Shaw is writing a book on Boston mobster Leo Finn, who has a very dangerous gunsel working for him. Jesse visits Development Associates and meets Finn and his strongman Lovey Norris. Asked about his relationship with Shaw, Finn reveals nothing. Soon after, Jesse and Luther respond to an armed robbery in progress at a local supermarket. Inside, Jesse encounters Jerry Snyder holding his wife hostage after shooting Mr. Kim, the store owner. When Jerry fires his weapon to the side, Jesse shoots him dead. However, Luther had been shot by Jerry. At the hospital, Luther is in critical condition and in a coma. Molly stays at Luther's side and reads to him.

Jesse returns to Shaw's house asking where he was the night of Billie's murder, and Shaw offers an alibi involving a meeting with Leo Finn. Later Finn tells Jesse he refused to meet with Shaw, saying that Shaw molests kids and uses his fundraisers as cover, so he didn't want such a person as his biographer. With a motive now established, Jesse returns to Shaw's house where he finds evidence that he committed the murder. After arresting Shaw, DNA from his discarded cigar confirms he was the father of Billie's unborn child. Despite the evidence, something doesn't make sense—a yachtsman like Shaw would never have used a slip knot to tie Billie's body to the cinder blocks that weighed her body down. Jesse arranges another meeting with Leo Finn, who shows up with his henchman Lovey. Jesse speculates that Shaw was working on an exposé of Finn rather than a biography, and that he now knows Finn had Billie killed and framed Shaw as the murderer in order to stop the publication of the exposé. When Lovey pulls his weapon, Jesse steps behind Finn who takes Lovey's initial shot in the back, and Jesse returns fire, killing Lovey. Later, after visiting Billie's grave, Jesse returns to the hospital, sits at Luther's side, and begins reading to him the story of the baseball player named Harry "Suitcase" Simpson.

== Cast ==
- Tom Selleck as Jesse Stone
- Viola Davis as Molly Crane
- Kohl Sudduth as Luther "Suitcase" Simpson
- Orla Brady as Lilly Summers
- Gary Basaraba as Norman Shaw
- John Diehl as Jerry Snyder
- Debra Christofferson as Mrs. Snyder
- Mae Whitman as Emily Bishop
- Matt Barr as Hooker Royce
- Edward Edwards as Hank Bishop
- Brendan Kelly as Lovey Norris
- Liisa Repo-Martell as Carole Genest
- Kerri Smith as Sister Mary John
- Stephen McHattie as Captain Healy
- Maria Ricossa as Sandy Bishop
- Vito Rezza as Anthony D'Angelo
- David Christoffel as Prosecutor
- John Beale as Dr. Perkins
- Steven Flynn as Leo Finn
- William Devane as Dr. Dix
- Carolyn Fitzgibbons as Billie Bishop
- Rhonda McLean as Miriam Lowell
- Michael Ha as Mr. Kim
- Murlane Carew as Valerie Morton
- Glen Lefchak as Ambulance Attendant
- John Maclaren as ER Surgeon
- Gil Anderson as Jenn (voice)

== Production ==
=== Filming locations ===
- Blue Rocks, Nova Scotia, Canada
- Halifax, Nova Scotia, Canada
- Lunenburg, Nova Scotia, Canada

== Reception ==
In his review in DVD Talk, Paul Mavis found the film "a nicely turned out, low-key mystery that tones down the agonizing of Jesse Stone: Night Passage, while concentrating more on the mechanics and procedures of Stone's job." Mavis continued:

Jesse Stone: Death in Paradise is much more oriented towards telling a straightforward mystery, watching the methods and procedures that Jesse Stone employs to work his way towards a solution. There's still plenty of time for Selleck, who's excellent here again as Stone, to ponder the gray shadows that make up the human condition—as well as his own personal life. But Jesse Stone: Death in Paradise moves much quicker than Jesse Stone: Night Passage, eliminating many of the long paused scenes of Selleck brooding over his life. Plot is key to Jesse Stone: Death in Paradise, and the quick, professional screenplay moves assuredly from one compact set-up to the next. Much like Jesse Stone: Night Passage, Jesse Stone: Death in Paradise has the clean, unadulterated feel of an old Hollywood programmer. And like Jesse Stone: Night Passage, Jesse Stone: Death in Paradise doesn't necessarily surprise you with its mystery, but that's okay. We've all seen too many detective films where action is the main focus; it's nice to see a production where emotion and thinking are the primary concern. Jesse Stone: Death in Paradise impresses with its detailed production, atmospheric feel, and the dead-on, spare thesping by the excellent supporting cast.

Mavis concluded that the film was "clean, polished, and professionally executed".

In his review in Monsters and Critics, Jeff Swindoll wrote that Selleck "continues to shine in the role of Jesse Stone and Death in Paradise is another fine entry in the series."

== See also ==
- Death in Paradise (novel)
