= The Reception (film) =

- Directed by: John G. Young
- Written by: John G. Young
- Starring: Pamela Holden Stewart; Darien Sills-Evans; Wayne Lamont Sims; Margaret Burkwit; Chris Burmester
- Cinematography: Derek Wiesehahn
- Edited by: J. Blake Fichera
- Distributed by: Strand Releasing
- Release date: 2005
- Running time: 80 minutes
- Country: United States
- Language: English

The Reception is 2005 feature film directed and written by John G. Young and starring Pamela Holden Stewart, Darien Sills-Evans, Wayne Lamont Sims, Margaret Burkwit, and Chris Burmester.

== Plot ==
The Reception is a drama set in wintry upstate New York. Hoping to cash in on an inheritance, Sierra (Margaret Burkwit) and her husband Andrew (Darien Sills-Evans) arrive at her mother's Jeannette's home only to discover resentful Jeannette (played by Pamela Holden Stewart) and her companion, the African-American artist Martin (Wayne Lamont Sims). Because the gay Martin is unable to satisfy her sexually, Jeannette takes to embarrassing him whenever she's drunk, yet Martin takes the abuse in strides.

Jeannette's daughter Sierra arrives as grandmother's fortune is hers to have once she is married. The newly-weds plan to stay just long enough to run away with the money. However, Jeannette throws a spanner in the works when she announces an impromptu wedding reception.

== Cast ==
- Pamela Holden Stewart as Jeannette
- Darien Sills-Evans as Andrew
- Wayne Lamont Sims as Martin
- Margaret Burkwith as Sierra
- Chris Burmester as Chuck
