= Love! Valour! Compassion! (film) =

1997 American film

- Theatrical release poster
- Directed by: Joe Mantello
- Screenplay by: Terrence McNally
- Based on: Love! Valour! Compassion! by Terrence McNally
- Produced by: Doug Chapin
- Starring: Jason Alexander; Stephen Spinella; Stephen Bogardus; Randy Becker; John Benjamin Hickey; Justin Kirk; John Glover
- Cinematography: Alik Sakharov
- Edited by: Colleen Sharp
- Music by: Harold Wheeler
- Distributed by: Fine Line Features
- Release date: January 25, 1997
- Running time: 108 minutes
- Country: United States
- Language: English
- Budget: $2 million
- Box office: $2.9 million

Love! Valour! Compassion! is a 1997 drama film directed by Joe Mantello and written by Terrence McNally, adapted from McNally's play of the same name. It revolves around eight gay men who gather for three summer weekends at a lakeside house in Dutchess County, New York, where they relax, reflect, and plan for survival in an era plagued by AIDS.

As with many screen adaptations of stage plays, the script underwent numerous changes, eliminating almost all direct addresses to the audience and the conclusion of one of the subplots. Mantello was nominated for the Grand Special Prize at the Deauville Film Festival.

== Synopsis ==
The story of eight gay male friends who spend the three major holiday weekends of one summer (Memorial Day, the Fourth of July, and Labor Day) together at a lakeside house in Dutchess County, New York in the mid 1990s. The house belongs to Gregory, a successful Broadway choreographer now approaching middle age, who fears he is losing his creativity, and his twenty-something lover Bobby, a legal assistant who is blind. Each of the guests at their house is connected to Gregory's work in one way or another. Arthur and his longtime partner Perry are business consultants; John Jeckyll, a sour and promiscuous Englishman, is a dance accompanist; and die-hard musical theater fanatic Buzz Hauser is a costume designer and the most stereotypical gay man in the group. Only John's summer lover Ramon and twin brother James are outside the circle of friends. Ramon is outgoing and eventually makes a place for himself in the group, while James is such a gentle soul that he is quickly welcomed. Infidelity, flirting, AIDS, skinny-dipping, truth-telling, and soul-searching mix questions about life and death with a dress rehearsal for Swan Lake performed in drag.

== Cast ==
In this film adaptation, McNally reunited the original cast, with the exceptions of Nathan Lane and Anthony Heald. Jason Alexander stepped in for Lane and Stephen Spinella replaced Heald.

Role	1995 Broadway Opening Night Cast	1997 Film Cast
Gregory Mitchell	Stephen Bogardus	Stephen Bogardus
John & James Jeckyll	John Glover	John Glover
Perry Sellars	Anthony Heald	Stephen Spinella
Buzz Hauser	Nathan Lane	Jason Alexander
Ramon Fornos	Randy Becker	Randy Becker
Arthur Pape	John Benjamin Hickey	John Benjamin Hickey
Bobby Brahms	Justin Kirk	Justin Kirk

== Reception ==
On the review aggregator website Rotten Tomatoes, 74% of 23 critics' reviews are positive. The website's consensus reads: "Sharp writing and a strong ensemble make Love! Valour! Compassion! work, though its stage-like presentation leaves something to be desired." Metacritic, which uses a weighted average, assigned the film a score of 59 out of 100, based on 20 critics, indicating "mixed or average" reviews.
