= Rivers Wash Over Me =

- Theatrical release poster
- Directed by: John G. Young
- Written by: John G. Young; Darien Sills-Evans
- Produced by: Darien Sills-Evans; Dexter Davis
- Starring: Derrick L. Middleton; Aidan Schultz-Meyer; Elizabeth Dennis; Darien Sills-Evans; Cameron Mitchell Mason; Duane McLaughlin; Pamela Holden Stewart
- Cinematography: Robert Ansbro
- Edited by: Steven Thomas
- Music by: Kenneth Lampl
- Production company: D Street Pictures
- Distributed by: Strand Releasing
- Release date: June 6, 2009
- Running time: 87 minutes
- Country: United States
- Language: English

Rivers Wash Over Me is a 2009 drama film directed by John G. Young. Young shares the screenplay with Darien Sills-Evans. The film was produced by Sills-Evans, with Dexter Davis as executive producer.

== Plot ==
The film touches on race relations, incest, drugs, and growing up gay in the American South. A recent New York City transplant, Sequan Greene (Derrick L. Middleton) has been sent to live in Alabama after the recent death of his mother. He is brutally raped by his cousin Michael Wilis (Cameron Mitchell Mason). It becomes clear that Michael also is gay - a victim as well as a victimizer. He says, "I can’t be a faggot ...You’re the faggot. You’re my faggot." Sequan is also bullied and beaten up at school.

Sequan soon finds a friend in Lori Anderson (Elizabeth Dennis), the girlfriend of drug dealer/basketball player Ahmed Robins (Duane McLaughlin). Lori is the town's "bad girl" who has a heart of gold. Although she freebases, snorts coke throughout the school day, steals guns and sleeps with the town basketball star, she is immediately taken by admiration of Sequan and his brazen nonconformity. Despite Sequan's unwillingness, Lori manages to befriend him, bringing him out of his shell and eventually introducing him to both moonshine and her gay brother, Jake (Aidan Schultz-Meyer).

== Cast ==
- Derrick L. Middleton as Sequan Greene
- Aidan Schultz-Meyer as Jake Anderson
- Elizabeth Dennis as Lori Anderson
- Darien Sills-Evans as Charles King
- Cameron Mitchell Mason as Michael Willis
- Duane McLaughlin as Ahmed Robins
- Pamela Holden Stewart as Alice
- Julia Carothers Hughes as Celeste Anderson
- Terrance Epps as Coach Williams
- Tina Jetter as Charity
- Leslie Jones as LuEllen
- Paul Kelly as Mr. Hack
- Alain Lauture as Skinny Tim Buchanan
- Sonequa Martin as Shawna King
- Conor Romero as Billy
- Xosha Roquemore as Racine Buchanan
- Chester A. Sims II as Mayor Rickets
- Don Striano as Tom Lemmings
- Damian Washington as Dwayne
- Eric Watson Williams as Deputy Lewis Ratch
