= Darien Sills-Evans =

American actor

- Born: Darien Sean Evans; October 11, 1974 (age 51); Brooklyn, New York, U.S.
- Occupations: Actor, writer, comedian, director
- Years active: 1995–present

Darien Evans, better known by his stage name, Darien Sills-Evans, is an American actor, writer, comedian, and director. He is best known for Darien in Cosby (1998–2000), Dr. Fields in Third Watch (2002–2005) and Andrew in The Reception (2005).

== Television career ==
Early in his career, Evans was best known for his television career including playing "Darien" on 17 episodes of the CBS sitcom Cosby from 1998 until 2000, and as “Dr. Fields” on the NBC drama Third Watch in 22 episodes from 2002 until 2005. Other guest appearances include Law & Order, New York Undercover, Law & Order: Special Victims Unit, The Black Donnellys, and Person of Interest. More recently, he played "Darnell Nichols" on 8 episodes of Treme between 2011 and 2013.

Since at least 2011, Evans has been the national spokesperson for U.S. Cellular.

== Cinema career ==
Sills-Evans wrote, directed and starred in the 2002 film X-Patriots, a romantic comedy about two black American men who travel to the Netherlands – a place where no one looks like them – in search of self-identity. Dutch media personality Chimène van Oosterhout was part of the cast in this movie. X-Patriots was named Best Feature Drama and a Critic's Choice at the Angelciti Film Festival in Chicago, and an official selection at the Boston Film Festival, the Newark Black Film Festival and the Sidewalk Film Festival. He financed the film with money he earned from his appearances on Cosby.

In 2005, Sills-Evans was associate producer and starred in The Reception directed by John G. Young which had its world premiere at the Tribeca Film Festival. The film subsequently played at numerous festivals in the U.S., including Outfest in Los Angeles, where Sills-Evans earned a best actor award.

In 2009, co-wrote and produced the feature film Rivers Wash Over Me directed by John G. Young.

In 2010, Sills-Evans directed the short film, "Dream House", written and produced by Caytha Jentis.

In 2010, Sills-Evans wrote and directed six episodes of "MC Extra Cheese: The 40-Year-Old Rapper" for American Cheesehole Productions. The pilot was nominated for Best Pilot at the 2012 Bannf World Media Festival.

In addition to his entertainment work, Sills-Evans has worked in the industrial video field directing and producing educational titles like I Don't Have a Problem: The Path to Addiction and Student Workshop: Building Character.

== Comedy ==
Sills-Evans has appeared in comedy venues across the United States. In 2010 he founded Tipsy Hustle, a comedy show and open mic that continues at The Five Spot Soul Food Restaurant in Brooklyn, New York and at The Improv Space in Los Angeles.

In 2014, Sills-Evans began production on RaceMan, a weekly podcast that features comedians - usually persons of color - discussing newsworthy events and pop culture.

== Filmography ==
=== Film ===
Year	Title	Role	Notes
2002	X-Patriots	Dexter Payne	
2002	Washington Heights	Danny	
2005	The Reception	Andrew	
2005	Angel Rodriguez	Receptionist	TV movie
2005	Preaching to the Choir	Wesley Tucker	
2008	Prana	Tourist	Short
2009	Rivers Wash Over Me	Charles King	
2013	Big Words	Malik	
2016	Namour	Lorene's Date	
2018	One Bedroom	Nate	
2018	Charlie Says	Bill Morris	
2018	City of Lies	Jefferson	
2020	Harana	Doc Alfred	Short
2023	So Fly Christmas	Floyd	TV movie

=== Television ===
Year	Title	Role	Notes
1992	Law & Order	Cyrus	Episode: "The Fertile Fields"
1995	New York Undercover	Lawrence	Episode: "CAT"
1998–2000	Cosby	Darien	Recurring Cast: Season 3, Main Cast: Season 4
2001	Law & Order: Special Victims Unit	CSU Tech Foster	Episode: "Folly"
2002–05	Third Watch	Dr. Fields	Recurring Cast: Season 3–6
2004	The Jury	Bennett Clarkson	Episode: "Bangers"
2006	The Bedford Diaries	Aaron Evans	Main Cast
2007	The Black Donnellys	Dr. Coles	Episode: "God is a Comedian"
2008	Law & Order	Young Male D.A.	Episode: "Strike"
2010-11	Blue Bloods	ESU Cop	Episode: "Officer Down" & "Cellar Boy"
2010–13	Treme	Darnell Nichols	Guest: Season 1, Recurring Cast: Season 2–4
2011–12	Person of Interest	CIA Agent Tyrell Evans	Recurring Cast: Season 1
2012	White Collar	Manager	Episode: "Pulling Strings"
2012	I Just Want My Pants Back	Driver	Episode: "Blackout"
2012	30 Rock	Man in the Bronx	Episode: "The Return of Avery Jessup"
2013	Cleaners	Detective Armstrong	Episode: "Till Death Do Us Part"
2013	Life with Jeannie	Himself	Episode: "My First Baby Jesus"
2015	The Whispers	General Ousmane Damba	Episode: "X Marks the Spot"
2016	Major Crimes	Mr. Thompson	Episode: "Moral Hazard"
2017	Superior Donuts	Officer James Jordan	Main Cast: Season 1
2017	Stitchers	Mark Fleming	Episode: "The Gremlin and the Fixer"
2017	SEAL Team	Mayberry	Episode: "Rolling Dark"
2018	We Bare Bears	Additional Voices (voice)	Episode: "Bearz II Men"
2019	Cannon Busters	Odin (voice)	Main Cast
2021	Bob Hearts Abishola	Stallholder	Episode: "Welcome to Lagos"
2021	The Conners	Mike	Guest: Season 3, Recurring Cast: Season 4
2022–23	East New York	Deputy Mayor Raymond Sharpe	Recurring Cast
2023	Primo	Steve Perkins	Episode: "The Recruitment Fair"
2023	The Lincoln Lawyer	Detective Howard O'Brien	Recurring Cast: Season 3
2023	Raven's Home	Mr. Reynolds	Episode: "Gown to the Wire"
2024	Wizards Beyond Waverly Place	Superintendent Kowalski	Episode: "Wizards Just Wand to Have Fun"
2026	The Comeback	Bryan Frasier	5 episodes
2026	Batman: Caped Crusader	Gunther Hardwick (voice)	Episode: Rocket's Red Glare

=== Video games ===
Year	Title	Role
2009	League of Legends	Pyke
2015	Star Wars: Uprising	Additional Voices
2015	Need for Speed	Additional Voices
2016	Mafia III	Additional Voices
2019	Days Gone	James Weaver
