= Puccini for Beginners =

2006 film by Maria Maggenti

- Directed by: Maria Maggenti
- Written by: Maria Maggenti
- Produced by: Gary Winick
- Starring: Elizabeth Reaser; Gretchen Mol; Justin Kirk
- Cinematography: Mauricio Rubinstein
- Edited by: Susan Graef
- Music by: Terry Dame
- Production companies: IFC Films; LOGO Films; Red Envelope Entertainment
- Distributed by: Strand Releasing
- Release dates: September 2, 2006 (Deauville Film Festival); February 2, 2007 (United States)
- Running time: 82 minutes
- Country: United States
- Language: English
- Box office: $110,864

Puccini for Beginners is a 2006 American romantic comedy film written and directed by Maria Maggenti and starring Elizabeth Reaser, Gretchen Mol, and Justin Kirk. The film debuted at the 2006 Sundance Film Festival, and was released to DVD in the United States on July 3, 2007.

== Plot ==
The story begins with Samantha breaking up with Allegra, a lesbian author who has had relationship problems in the past. Allegra meets a man named Philip at a party, with whom she feels a connection. The next day, she meets Grace, Philip's ex-girlfriend, although Allegra does not know about it. Allegra and Philip begin seeing each other, and Philip leaves Grace for good. Allegra sees Grace outside of a movie theater and Grace cries about her boyfriend leaving her. Allegra goes on a date with Philip, but she leaves after thoughts in her mind tell her it is wrong to be with a guy.

Allegra goes back and forth on dates with Philip and Grace. After several more dates, Grace shows Allegra a picture of her ex-boyfriend, and she learns that Philip and Grace were together. Philip and Grace go out for dinner, where they reveal to each other that they are seeing someone else. Meanwhile, Allegra caters at a party, which turns out to be Samantha's engagement party. Philip and Grace show up at the party, and they both discover that they have been seeing the same woman. In the end, Allegra is back with Samantha and never sees Philip and Grace again.

== Cast ==
- Elizabeth Reaser as Allegra
- Gretchen Mol as Grace
- Justin Kirk as Philip
- Julianne Nicholson as Samantha
- Jennifer Dundas as Molly
- Tina Benko as Nell
- Brian Letscher as Jeff
- Kate Simses as Vivian
- Will Bozarth as Jimmy
- Ken Barnett as Scott
