= Debra Christofferson =

American actress

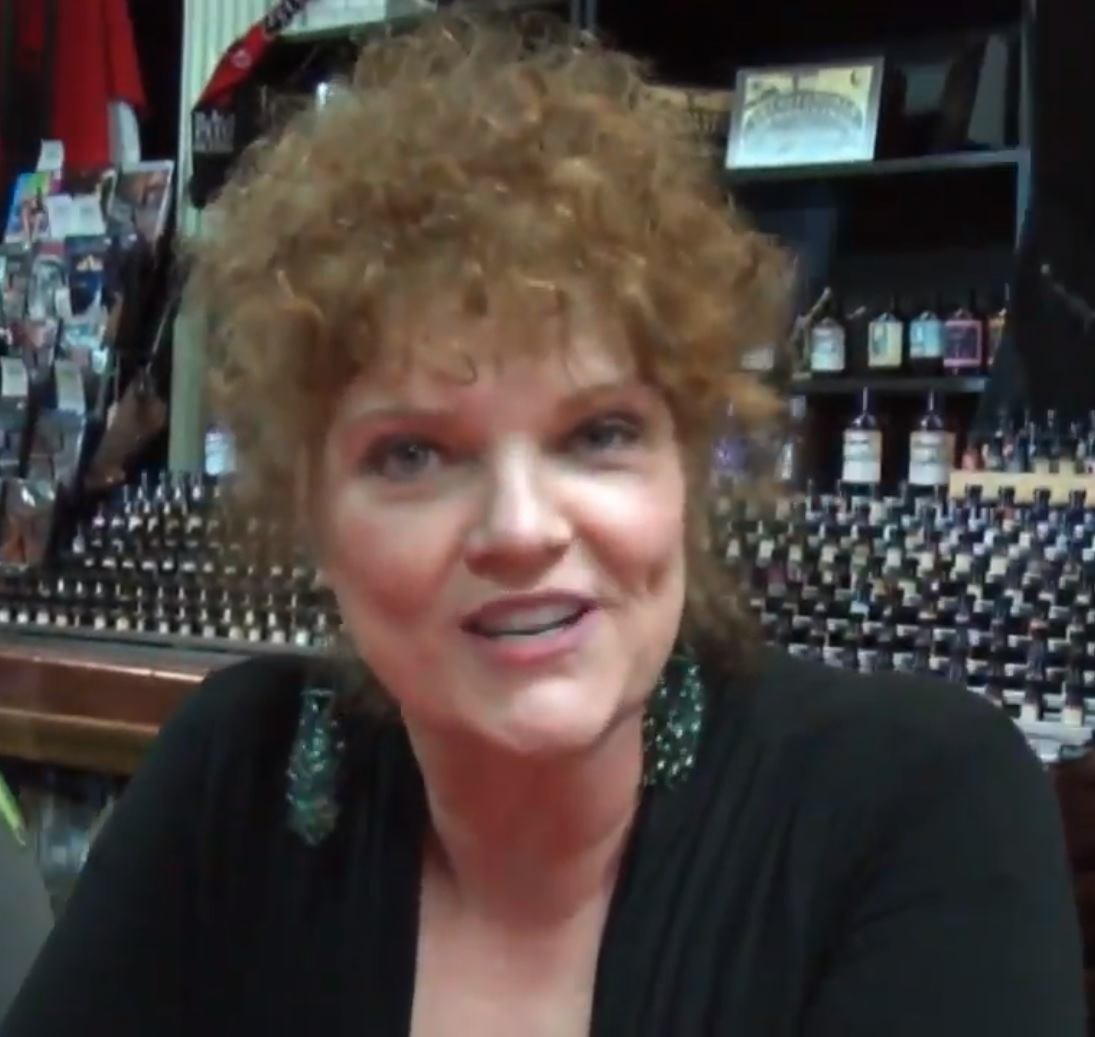
- Christofferson in 2011
- Born: January 9, 1963 (age 63); Spearfish, South Dakota, U.S.
- Occupation: Actress
- Years active: 1982–present

Debra Christofferson (born January 9, 1963) is an American actress known for her roles in film and television.

== Filmography ==
=== Film ===
Year	Title	Role	Notes
1984	Weekend Pass	Candy	
1992	Round Numbers	Katie	
1994	The Silence of the Hams	Misery Woman	
1995	Under the Hula Moon	Kim Jones	
1996	White Cargo	B.D.	
1997	Mousehunt	Ingrid	
1998	The Lesser Evil	Betty	
1998	Restons groupés	Kathy	
1998	The Godson	Writer	
1998	Mr. P's Dancing Sushi Bar	Catherine	
1999	My Favorite Martian	Mrs. Butz	
1999	Wild Wild West	Dora Lookalike	
2001	Stealing Time	Roselyn Hatchett	
2002	White Oleander	Marlena	
2007	I Know Who Killed Me	Paloma Sherwood	
2007	InAlienable	General Feragni Atah	
2008	Changeling	Police Matron at Train	
2014	Murder of a Cat	Barb	
2015	1915	Lillian	
2018	Doe	Margaret	
2024	'Salem's Lot	Anne Norton	Streaming film

=== Television ===
Year	Title	Role	Notes
1982	T. J. Hooker	Wife Trucker	Episode: "Thieves' Highway"
1984	The Master	Girl	Episode: "State of the Union"
1985	Knots Landing	Mother	Episode: "#14 with a Bullet"
1986	Mr. Sunshine	Maureen Evans	Episode: "Pilot"
1986	A Smoky Mountain Christmas	Nurse	Television film
1987	Crime Story	Nurse	Episode: "Top of the World"
1987	Starmania	Receptionist	Episode: "Fathers and Sons"
1989	Moonlighting	Francesca	Episode: "In 'N Outlaws"
1991	The Gambler Returns: The Luck of the Draw	Paula Thomas	Television film
1994	Married... with Children	Paulina	Episode: "Ride Scare"
1996	Murder One	Holly Gerges	Episode: "Chapter Ten"
1996	Cybill	Lost Woman	Episode: "An Officer and a Thespian"
1996	JAG	Change Nurse	Episode: "Hemlock"
1996	Profiler	Helen Oaks	Episode: "Cruel and Unusual"
1996–1997	NYPD Blue	Geri Turner	6 episodes
1997	Mike Hammer, Private Eye	Brenda Smidley	Episode: "www.murder"
1998	The Jamie Foxx Show	Sister Elizabeth	Episode: "Convent-ional Gifts"
1998	The Patron Saint of Liars	Sister Bernadette	Television film
1998	Silk Stalkings	Sister	Episode: "Passion and the Palm Beach Detectives"
1999	The X-Files	Pat Verlander	Episode: "Arcadia"
1999	Family Rules	Jo	Episode: "Ann's Big Night"
1999	Ally McBeal	Vicky Sharpe	Episode: "Only the Lonely"
1999	Oh Baby	Suzanne	Episode: "Corruption"
1999	Chicago Hope	Taylor	Episode: "Oh What a Piece of Work Is Man"
1999	Hard Time	Ricki Stewart / Susan's Aide	Television film
2000	G vs E	Matilda Beery	Episode: "Portrait of Evil"
2000	Just Shoot Me!	MaryLou Eberhoffer	Episode: "A&E Biography: Nina Van Horn"
2000	The Magnificent Seven	Hilda	Episode: "Obsession"
2001	The Division	Homeless DOA's Daughter	Episode: "There But for Fortune"
2001	Diagnosis: Murder	Lena	Episode: "Less Than Zero"
2001	First Years	Donna	Episode: "Lawyerboy"
2001	Dharma & Greg	Marilyn Peters	Episode: "Wish We Weren't Here"
2001	The Day the World Ended	Nurse Della Divelbuss	Television film
2001	Taking Back Our Town	Andrea	Television film
2002	For the People	Diedre	Episode: "Sins of the Mother"
2003	Miss Match	Judge Blake	Episode: "Bad Judgement"
2003–2005	Carnivàle	Lila	24 episodes
2005	CSI: Crime Scene Investigation	Regina Owens	Episode: "Big Middle"
2006	Jesse Stone: Death in Paradise	Mrs. Snyder	Television film
2007	Side Order of Life	Gina	Episode: "Pilot"
2007	Grey's Anatomy	Elaine	Episode: "Let the Truth Sting"
2008	Rodney	Red	Episode: "Finale"
2008	Weeds	Uptown Rehab Counselor	Episode: "Head Cheese"
2008	Bones	Kelly Sutton	Episode: "The Perfect Pieces in the Purple Pond"
2010	The Mentalist	Kay Vickers	Episode: "Rose-Colored Glasses"
2012	NCIS	Rita Gregg	Episode: "The Namesake"
2012	American Horror Story: Asylum	Mrs. Stone	Episode: "Dark Cousin"
2013	Southland	Melanie	Episode: "Off Duty"
2014	The Young and the Restless	Willa Ward	4 episodes
2015	A Deadly Adoption	Ellen Macy	Television film
2015	Rectify	Miss Kathy	Episode: "The Future"
2015–2016	100 Things to Do Before High School	Natasha Villavovodovich	5 episodes
2016	Longmire	Pyper Callans	2 episodes
2016–2017	Outcast	Kat Ogden	6 episodes
2017	SEAL Team	Denise	Episode: "The Spinning Wheel"
2018	The Fosters	Dr. Tricia Barrone	2 episodes
2018–present	9-1-1	Sue Blevins	38+ episodes
2019	Mayans M.C.	Linda Pollen	Episode: "Camazotz"
2021	Why Women Kill	Nora	Episode: "The Unguarded Moment"
