= Trouble in Paradise (novel) =

1998 novel by Robert B. Parker

- First edition
- Author: Robert B. Parker
- Language: English
- Series: Jesse Stone
- Genre: Crime novel
- Publisher: Putnam
- Publication date: 1998
- Publication place: United States
- Pages: 324
- ISBN: 0-399-14433-1
- Preceded by: Night Passage
- Followed by: Death in Paradise

Trouble in Paradise is a crime novel by Robert B. Parker, the second in his Jesse Stone series.

== Plot summary ==
In Parker's second Jesse Stone novel we find Chief Stone settled into his new life after the events that marked his arrival in Night Passage. Jesse's ex-wife, Jenn, has also relocated to Massachusetts in nearby Boston. There she finds work and minor celebrity status as the weather girl for the Channel 3 news. Although Jesse and Jenn are seeing each other again, Jenn refuses to commit solely to him, and they both continue to see other people. Jenn is seeing the lead news anchor, while Jesse juggles relationships with her, local real estate agent Marcy Campbell, and Abby Taylor. Throughout the novel Jesse's sexual prowess is the subject of office wisecracking, which he doesn't mind at all.

The main plot of the novel concerns ex-con Jimmy Macklin. After being released from prison, Macklin hatches a plot to rob the entire community of Stiles Island. The island is accessible from Paradise by a bridge and one boat port. Entrance to the island is guarded by private security, ensuring safety for its wealthy residents and island bank. Macklin puts together a crew with his partner Wilson "Crow" Cromartie, an American Indian. The rest of the crew consists of a demolitions expert, a boatman to pilot their nautical escape, and one other to cut the telephone lines and provide muscle.

To fund their criminal enterprise, Macklin and Crow commit several violent crimes. Macklin rips off a local poker game and murders the man running it in the process. Crow murders two Chinese drug dealers and steals a large amount of poor quality cocaine. He then sells the cocaine to other drug dealers.

Macklin and his girlfriend Faye, using the aliases Mr. and Mrs. Harry Smith, use Marcy Campbell to gain access to the island by posing as prospective home buyers. They also set up a meeting with Chief Stone to inquire about local crime. Macklin uses the meeting to size up Chief Stone. However the meeting ends up working against him as Jesse finds him suspicious and begins to investigate him. He discovers that Harry Smith is really ex-con Jimmy Macklin, and begins staking out his apartment. During the stakeout he runs the plates of their van and discovers it belongs to Crow. A phone call to a friend and fellow police officer in Arizona where the van is registered confirms that Crow is a dangerous criminal, and Jesse is warned not to confront him alone.

The final third of the novel details the Stiles Island heist. Macklin and his crew drive onto the island and storm Marcy Campbell's office which they intend to use as headquarters during the operation. They then murder the security guards and place one of their own at the bridge which they previously wired with explosives. Macklin and Crow begin going door to door, stealing safe deposit box keys for the island bank from island residents and then locking them in their bathrooms. When a police cruiser tries to cross onto the island on patrol, they blow up the bridge before it reaches the other side. Chief Stone is immediately notified, and they attempt to take a boat to the island, but before they reach the dock the criminals blow that too.

With no way to the island, the Paradise police are forced to wait for the state police to arrive with a helicopter and SWAT team. Not satisfied to wait around, Stone gets a local man to take him as close to the island as he can in his boat and then swims the rest of the way. Meanwhile, Macklin and crew finish ripping off the bank's safe deposit boxes and head to the island's restaurant with six female hostages, including Marcy. There they wait for high tide when their boat can get closer to the island. While they are waiting Crow murders two of their accomplices to increase their share of the loot.

After the tide comes in, they make the hostages wade out to the boat carrying the loot. Crow climbs aboard the boat first, but before Macklin can even get in the water Stone confronts him at gunpoint. Macklin yells for Crow, but Crow and the boatman leave him and the hostages behind with Crow declaring that he doesn't hide behind women. Macklin draws his weapon and Stone shoots and kills him. Police later find the boat washed up on shore with the boatman murdered and no sign of Crow or the loot.

== Subplots ==
A subplot deals with the arson of a gay couple's home by three teenage boys. Chief Stone intimidates the boys into confessing by making them believe their accomplices have already confessed. When the boys' parents find out, they threaten to sue for harassment and false arrest. During a meeting with the parents and their lawyers, Jesse plays a tape of the confessions. He knows that there is not enough evidence to convict them, but he hopes to scare the parents into disciplining their children. The parents agree not to sue because they know the taped confessions would be played in court. However, Kay Hopkins, the mother of two of the boys, vows to end Jesse's career in Paradise. And as a wealthy and prominent member of the community, the threat is a real one. After hearing about this, Jesse's ex-wife attacks Kay at a town meeting. She breaks Kay's nose, and is so frantic that police have to pull her off. She is arrested and while in jail Jesse confronts her about the incident, then releases her.

Jesse's relationship with Jenn is a continuing issue throughout the novel, as is his struggle with alcohol. He has always regretted not murdering the man that Jenn cheated on him with, although he knows it would have ruined his life. At one point Jesse stakes out Jenn's apartment after she has a date with her news anchor friend. From his car Jesse aims his weapon at him and contemplates murdering him, but he does not go through with it. Later he confesses the incident to Jenn and although she is angered, he swears to never do it again. The novel ends with Jen still unwilling to commit wholly to Jesse.
