= Carnivàle =

2003 American television series

- Genre: Dark fantasy; Period drama; Mystery
- Created by: Daniel Knauf
- Starring: Michael J. Anderson; Adrienne Barbeau; Patrick Bauchau; Clancy Brown; Debra Christofferson; Tim DeKay; Clea DuVall; Cynthia Ettinger; John Fleck; Carla Gallo; Toby Huss; Amy Madigan; Diane Salinger; Nick Stahl; Karyne Steben; Sarah Steben; Brian Turk; Ralph Waite
- Theme music composer: Wendy Melvoin; Lisa Coleman
- Composer: Jeff Beal
- Country of origin: United States
- Original language: English
- No. of seasons: 2
- No. of episodes: 24 (list of episodes)

Production
- Executive producers: Howard Klein; Daniel Knauf; Ronald D. Moore
- Production location: California
- Camera setup: Single-camera
- Running time: 46–58 minutes
- Production companies: 3 Arts Entertainment; Home Box Office

Original release
- Network: HBO
- Release: September 7, 2003 – March 27, 2005

Carnivàle (/ˌkɑːrnɪˈvæl/) is an American television series set in the United States Dust Bowl during the Great Depression of the 1930s. The series, created by Daniel Knauf for HBO, ran for two seasons from September 7, 2003 to March 27, 2005. In tracing the lives of disparate groups of people in a traveling carnival, Knauf's story combined a bleak atmosphere with elements of the surreal in portraying struggles between good and evil and between free will and destiny. The show's mythology draws upon themes and motifs from traditional Christianity and gnosticism together with Masonic lore, particularly that of the Knights Templar order.

Nick Stahl starred as Ben Hawkins, and Clancy Brown as Brother Justin Crowe. Knauf also served as executive producer along with Ronald D. Moore and 3 Arts Entertainment's Howard Klein. The show was filmed in Santa Clarita, California, and nearby Southern California locations.

Early reviews praised Carnivàle for style and originality but questioned the approach and execution of the story. The first episode set an audience record for an HBO original series and drew durable ratings through the first season. When the series proved unable to sustain these ratings in its second season, it was cancelled. An intended six-season run was thus cut short by four seasons.

In all, 24 episodes of Carnivàle were broadcast. In 2004, the series won five Emmys out of fifteen nominations. The show received numerous other nominations and awards between 2004 and 2006.

== Episodes ==
Season	Episodes	Originally released		Average viewership (in millions)
Season	Episodes	First released	Last released	Average viewership (in millions)
1	12	September 14, 2003	November 30, 2003	3.54
2	12	January 9, 2005	March 27, 2005	1.70

The two seasons of Carnivàle take place in the Depression-era Dust Bowl between 1934 and 1935, and consist of two main plotlines that slowly converge. The first involves a young man with strange healing powers named Ben Hawkins (Nick Stahl), who joins a traveling carnival when it passes near his home in Milfay, Oklahoma. Soon thereafter, Ben begins having surrealistic dreams and visions, which set him on the trail of a man named Henry Scudder, a drifter who crossed paths with the carnival many years before, and who apparently possessed unusual abilities similar to Ben's own.

The second plotline revolves around a Father Coughlin-esque Methodist preacher, Brother Justin Crowe (Clancy Brown), who lives with his sister Iris (Amy Madigan) in California. He shares Ben's prophetic dreams and slowly discovers the extent of his own unearthly powers, which include bending human beings to his will and making their sins and greatest evils manifest as terrifying visions. Certain that he is doing God's work, Brother Justin fully devotes himself to his religious duties, not realizing that his ultimate nemesis, Ben Hawkins, and the carnival are inexorably drawing closer.

== Production ==
=== Conception ===
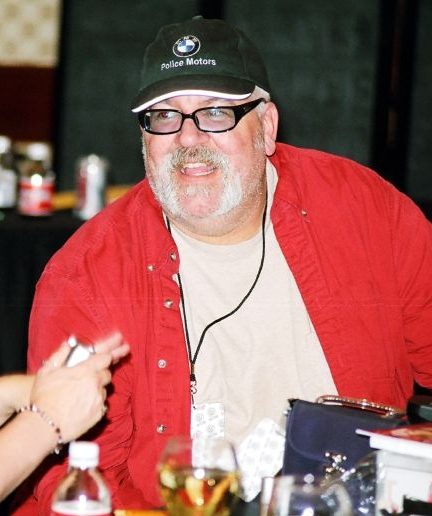
Show creator Daniel Knauf

Daniel Knauf conceived the initial script for the show between 1990 and 1992 when he was unsatisfied with his job as a Californian health insurance broker and hoped to become a screenwriter. He had always been interested in carnivals and noted that this subject had rarely been dramatized on film. Knauf's experiences of growing up with a disabled father who was not commonly accepted as a normal human strongly informed the story and its treatment of freaks.

Knauf named the intended feature film script Carnivàle, using an unusual spelling for a more outlandish look. Knauf had plotted the story's broad strokes as well as several plot details from early on and knew the story destination until the final scene. However, the resulting 180-page long script was twice the length of a typical feature film script, and Knauf still felt that it was too short to do his story justice. He therefore shelved the screenplay as a learning experience. In the meantime, Hollywood studios rejected all but one of Knauf's other scripts, often for being "too weird."

In the mid-1990s, Knauf met a few Writers Guild TV writers who encouraged him to revise Carnivàle as a TV series. Knauf turned the script's first act into a pilot episode, but, having no contacts in the television business, he was forced to shelve the project again and return to his regular job. A few years later, after realizing that his insurance career was not working out, he decided to give his screenwriting efforts a last chance by offering the Carnivàle pilot on his website. The script was subsequently forwarded to Howard Klein by Scott Winant, a mutual friend of the two men. After several meetings and conversations, Klein felt confident that Carnivàle would make a good episodic television series that could last for many years. Klein brought it to the attention of Chris Albrecht and Carolyn Strauss of HBO, who were immediately receptive. The network deemed Knauf too inexperienced in the television business to give him full control over the budget, and appointed Ronald D. Moore as showrunner. (Knauf replaced Moore after one season when Moore left for the reimagined Battlestar Galactica.)

The pilot episode, which was filmed over a period of 21 days, served as the basis for additional tweaking of intended story lines. Long creative discussions took place among the writers and the network, leading to the postponement of the filming of the second episode for fourteen months. One major change was the addition of extra material for Brother Justin's side of the story. Brother Justin was originally conceived as a well-established preacher, and as a recurring character rather than a regular one. However, after perusing the preliminary version of the pilot, Knauf and the producers realized that there was no room for Justin to grow in a television series. Hence, it was decided to make Brother Justin an ordinary Methodist minister in a small town, setting him back in his career by about one or two years. Expanding Brother Justin's role opened new possibilities, and his sister Iris was created as a supporting character. Little was changed on Ben Hawkins' side except for the addition of the cootch (striptease) family; a Carnivàle consultant had elated the producers by calling attention to his research about families managing cootch shows in the 1930s.

=== Format ===
The Carnivàle story was originally intended to be a trilogy of "books", consisting of two seasons each. This plan did not come to fruition, as HBO canceled the show after the first two seasons. Each season consists of twelve episodes.

Airing on HBO benefited Carnivàle in several ways. Because HBO does not rely on commercial breaks, Carnivàle had the artistic freedom to vary in episode length. Although the episodes averaged a runtime of 54 minutes, the episodes "Insomnia" and "Old Cherry Blossom Road" were 46 minutes and 59 minutes, respectively. HBO budgeted approximately US$4 million for each episode, considerably more than most television series receive.

=== Historical production design ===
Carnivàle's 1930s' Dust Bowl setting required significant research and historical consultants to be convincing, which was made possible with HBO's strong financial backing. As a result, reviews praised the look and production design of the show as "impeccable", "spectacular" and as "an absolute visual stunner." In 2004, Carnivàle won four Emmys for art direction, cinematography, costumes, and hairstyling.

To give a sense of the dry and dusty environment of the Dust Bowl, smoke and dirt were constantly blown through tubes onto the set. The actors' clothes were ragged and drenched in dirt, and Carnivàle had approximately 5,000 people costumed in the show's first season alone. The creative team listened to 1930s' music and radio and read old Hollywood magazines to get the period's sound, language, and slang right. The art department had an extensive research library of old catalogs, among them an original 1934 Sears Catalog, which were purchased at flea markets and antique stores. The East European background of some characters and Asian themes in Brother Justin's story were incorporated into the show. Aside from the show's supernatural elements, a historical consultant deemed Carnivàle's historical accuracy to be excellent regarding the characters' lives and clothes, their food and accommodations, their cars and all the material culture.

=== Filming locations ===
Carnivàle's interiors were filmed at Santa Clarita Studios in Santa Clarita, California, while the show's many exterior scenes were filmed on Southern California locations. The scenes of fictional California town of Mintern, where the stories about Brother Justin and Iris in Season 1 were based, were shot at Paramount Ranch in Agoura Hills. The carnival set itself was moved around the greater Southern California area, to movie ranches and to Lancaster, which were to replicate the states of Oklahoma, Texas, and New Mexico. The permanent filming location of the carnival in Season 2 was Big Sky Ranch, which was also used for Brother Justin's new home in fictional New Canaan.

=== Opening title sequence ===
Carnivàle's opening title sequence was created by A52, a visual effects and design company based in Los Angeles, and featured music composed by Wendy Melvoin and Lisa Coleman. The opening title sequence won an Emmy for "Outstanding Main Title Design" in 2004.

One frame of Carnivàle's opening title sequence

The production team of A52 had intended to "create a title sequence that grounded viewers in the mid-1930s, but that also allowed people to feel a larger presence of good and evil over all of time." In early 2003, A52 pitched their idea to Carnivàle executives, who felt that the company's proposal was the most creative for the series' concept. The actual production included scanned transparencies of famous pieces of artwork, each scanned transparency being up to 300 MB in size. The resulting images were photoshopped and digitally rendered. A last step involved stock footage clips being compiled and digitally incorporated into the sequence.

The opening title sequence itself begins with a deck of Tarot cards falling into the sand, while the camera moves in and enters one card into a separate world presenting layers of artwork and footage from iconic moments of the American Depression era; the camera then moves back out of a different card and repeats the procedure several times. The sequence ends with the camera shifting from the "Judgement" Tarot card to the "Moon" and the "Sun", identifying the Devil and God respectively, until the wind blows away all cards and the underlying sand to reveal the Carnivàle title artwork.

=== Music ===
Carnivàle features instrumental music composed by Jeff Beal, as well as many popular or obscure songs from the 1920s and 1930s, the time when Carnivàle's story takes place. However, "After the Ball", which was a major hit in the 1890s, is used to prominent effect at the close of season 1, episode 2.

The main title was written by The Revolution members Wendy Melvoin and Lisa Coleman, and was released with selected themes by Jeff Beal on a Carnivàle television soundtrack by the record label Varèse Sarabande on December 7, 2004. Beal released tracks of Season 2 on his personal website. A complete list of music credits is available on the official HBO website.

Jeff Beal's score is primarily acoustic sounding electronics, but mixes themes of bluegrass as well as atmospheric rhythmic sounds. Bigger groups of strings support smaller ensembles of guitars, pianos, violins, cellos, and trumpets. The music sometimes uses ethnic instruments such as banjos, harmonicas, ukuleles, and duduks.

Because HBO does not break individual episodes with commercials, Carnivàle's music is paced similar to a movie, with character-specific leitmotifs from as early as the first episode. Characters are musically identified by solo instruments chosen for the character's ethnic background or nature. Some characters whose connections are only disclosed later in the series have intentionally similar themes.

Different music is consciously used to represent the two different worlds of the story. Brother Justin's world features music of constructed orchestral sound with religious music and instruments. On the other hand, the score of the carnival side is more deconstructed and mystical, especially when the carnival travels through the Dust Bowl and remote towns. For carnival scenes taking place in the cootch (striptease) show or in cities, however, contemporary pop music, blues, folk, and ethnic music is played. One of the most defining songs of Carnivàle is the 1920s song "Love Me or Leave Me" sung by Ruth Etting, which is used in several episodes to tie characters in the two worlds thematically.

== Cast ==
From left to right – front row: Lodz, Lila, Libby, Caladonia and Alexandria, Apollonia, Sofie, Ben Hawkins, Jonesy, Iris, Brother Justin – back row: Dora Mae, Rita Sue, Stumpy, Ruthie, Gecko, Samson

The plot of Carnivàle takes place in the 1930s Dust Bowl and revolves around the slowly converging storylines of a traveling carnival and a Californian preacher. Out of the 17 actors receiving star billing in the first season, 15 were part of the carnival storyline. The second season amounted to 13 main cast members, supplemented by several actors in recurring roles. Although such large casts make shows more expensive to produce, the writers are benefited with more flexibility in story decisions. The backgrounds of most characters were fully developed before the filming of Carnivàle began but were not part of the show's visible structure. The audience therefore only learned more about the characters as a natural aspect in the story.

Season 1's first storyline is led by Nick Stahl portraying the protagonist Ben Hawkins, a young Okie farmer who joins a traveling carnival. Michael J. Anderson played Samson, the diminutive manager of the carnival. Tim DeKay portrayed Clayton "Jonesy" Jones, the crippled chief roustabout. Patrick Bauchau acted as the carnival's blind mentalist Lodz, while Debra Christofferson played his lover, Lila the Bearded Lady. Diane Salinger portrayed the catatonic fortune teller Apollonia, and Clea DuVall acted as her tarot-card-reading daughter, Sofie. Adrienne Barbeau portrayed the snake charmer Ruthie, with Brian Turk as her son Gabriel, a strongman. John Fleck played Gecko the Lizard Man, and Karyne and Sarah Steben appeared as the conjoined twins Alexandria and Caladonia. The cootch show Dreifuss family was played by Toby Huss and Cynthia Ettinger as Felix "Stumpy" and Rita Sue, and Carla Gallo as their daughter Libby. Amanda Aday portrayed their other daughter, Dora Mae Dreifuss, in a recurring role. John Savage played the mysterious Henry Scudder in several episodes, while Linda Hunt lent her voice to the mysterious Management. The second storyline is led by Clancy Brown portraying the primary antagonist, the Methodist minister Brother Justin Crowe. Amy Madigan played his sister Iris. Robert Knepper supported them as the successful radio host Tommy Dolan later in the first season, while Ralph Waite had a recurring role as Reverend Norman Balthus, Brother Justin's mentor. K Callan performed in a recurring role as Eleanor McGill, a parishioner who became devoted to Brother Justin after seeing his power firsthand.

Several cast changes took place in Season 2, some of them planned from the beginning. John Fleck, Karyne Steben and her sister Sarah had made their last appearance in the first season's finale, while Patrick Bauchau's and Diane Salinger's status was reduced to guest-starring. Ralph Waite joined the regular cast. Several new characters were introduced in recurring roles, most notably John Carroll Lynch as the escaped convict Varlyn Stroud and Bree Walker as Sabina the Scorpion Lady.

=== Casting ===
The casting approach for Carnivàle was to cast the best available actors and to show the characters' realness as opposed to depending on freak illusions too much. Carnivàle's casting directors John Papsodera and Wendy O'Brien already had experience in casting freaks from previous projects. The producers generally preferred actors who were not strongly identified with other projects, but were willing to make exceptions such as for Adrienne Barbeau as Ruthie.

The script for the pilot episode was the basis for the casting procedure, with little indication where the show went afterwards. This resulted in some preliminary casting disagreements between the creators and producers, especially for leading characters such as Ben, Brother Justin and Sofie. The character of Ben was always intended to be the leading man and hero of the series, yet he was also desired to display a youthful, innocent and anti-hero quality; Nick Stahl had the strongest consensus among the producers. The character of Sofie was originally written as more of an exotic gypsy girl, but Clea DuVall, a movie actor like Stahl, got the part after four auditions. Tim DeKay was cast as Jonesy because the producers felt he best portrayed a "very American-looking" baseball player of that period. One of the few actors who never had any real competition was Michael J. Anderson as Samson, whom Daniel Knauf had wanted as early as the initial meeting.

== Mythology ==
Although almost every Carnivàle episode has a distinctive story with a new carnival setting, all episodes are part of an overarching good-versus-evil story that culminates and is resolved only very late in Season 2. The pilot episode begins with a prologue talking of "a creature of light and a creature of darkness" (also known as Avatars) being born "to each generation" preparing for a final battle. Carnivàle does not reveal its characters as Avatars beyond insinuation, and makes the nature of suggested Avatars a central question. Reviewers believed Ben to be a Creature of Light and Brother Justin a Creature of Darkness.

Other than through the characters, the show's good-and-evil theme manifests in the series' contemporary religion, the Christian military order Knights Templar, tarot divination, and in historical events like the Dust Bowl and humankind's first nuclear test. The writers had established a groundwork for story arcs, character biographies and genealogical character links before filming of the seasons began, but many of the intended clues remained unnoticed by viewers. While Ronald D. Moore was confident that Carnivàle was one of the most complicated shows on television, Daniel Knauf reassured critics that Carnivàle was intended to be a demanding show with a lot of subtext and admitted that "you may not understand everything that goes on but it does make a certain sense". Knauf provided hints about the show's mythological structure to online fandom both during and after the two-season run of Carnivàle, and left fans a production summary of Carnivàle's first season two years after cancellation.

Matt Roush of TV Guide called Carnivàle "the perfect show for those who thought Twin Peaks was too accessible". The Australian said Carnivàle "seems to have been conceived in essentially literary terms" which "can sometimes work on the page but is deadly on the large screen, let alone a small one. It's almost like a biblical injunction against pretension on television." A reviewer admitted his temptation to dismiss the first season of Carnivàle as "too artsy and esoteric" because his lack of involvement prevented him from understanding "what the heck was going on, [which] can be a problem for a dramatic television series." TV Zone however considered Carnivàle "a series like no other and [...] the fact that it is so open to interpretation surprisingly proves to be one of its greatest strengths." Carnivàle was lauded for bringing "the hopelessness of the Great Depression to life" and for being among the first TV shows to show "unmitigated pain and disappointment", but reviewers were not confident that viewers would find the "slowly unfolding sadness" appealing over long or would have the patience or endurance to find out the meaning of the show.

== Cancellation ==
At the time, HBO made their commitments for only one year at a time, a third season would have meant opening up a new two-season book in Daniel Knauf's six-year plan, including the introduction of new storylines for current and new characters, and further clarification and elaboration on the show's mythology. HBO announced that the show had been cancelled on May 11, 2005. HBO's president Chris Albrecht said the network would have considered otherwise if the producers had been willing to lower the price of an episode to US$2 million; but the running costs for the sizable cast, the all-on-location shooting and the number of episodes per season were too enormous for them.

The cancellation resulted in several story plot lines being unfinished, and outraged loyal viewers organized petitions and mailing drives to get the show renewed. This generated more than 50,000 emails to the network in a single weekend. Show creator Daniel Knauf was unconvinced of the success of such measures, but explained that proposed alternatives like selling Carnivàle to a competing network or spinning off the story were not possible because of HBO owning Carnivàle's plot and characters. At the same time, Knauf was hopeful that, given a strong enough fan base, HBO might reconsider the show's future and allow the continuation of the show in another medium; but because of the amount of unused story material he still had, Knauf did not favor finishing the Carnivàle story with a three-hour movie.

Knauf did not release a detailed run-down of intended future plots to fans, explaining that his stories are a collaboration of writers, directors and actors alike. He and the producers did, however, answer a few basic details about the immediate fate of major characters who were left in near-fatal situations in the final episode of Season 2. Knauf additionally provided in-depth information regarding the underlying fictional laws of nature that the writers had not been able to fully explore in the first two seasons. June 2007 however marked the first time that a comprehensive work of detailed character backgrounds was made public. Following a fundraising auction, Knauf offered fans a so-called "Pitch Document," a summary of Carnivàle's first season. This document was originally written in 2002 and 2003 to give the writers and the studio an idea about the series' intended plot, and answered many of the show's mysteries.

== Marketing and merchandise ==
=== Pre-broadcast marketing ===
HBO reportedly invested in Carnivàle's promotion as much as for any of its primetime series launches. The series' unconventional and complex narrative made the network deviate from its traditional marketing strategies. Teaser trailers were inserted on CD-ROMs into Entertainment Weekly issues to draw attention to the show's visual quality. 30-second TV spots were aired in national syndication, cable and local avails for four weeks before the show's premiere instead of the usual seven days. The historical context of Carnivàle was deliberately emphasized in the show's print art, which depicted the 17-member cast surrounding a carnival truck. This image was accompanied by a tagline of the show's good versus evil theme: "Into each generation is born a creature of light and a creature of darkness." These measures were hoped to be backed up by positive critical reviews. To give ratings an initial boost, HBO placed the premiere of Carnivàle directly after the series finale of the successful Sex and the City. The series continued to receive extensive online advertisement for almost its entire run.

=== Games ===
Personalized and interactive online games inspired by tarot divination were created for Carnivàle's internet presence. The official HBO website collaborated with RealNetworks to offer FATE: The Carnivàle Game, a downloadable game made available for trial and for purchase.

=== DVDs ===
Carnivàle: The Complete First Season was released as a widescreen six-disc Region 1 DVD box set on December 7, 2004, one month before the premiere of the second season. It was distributed by HBO Home Video and contained three audio commentaries and a behind-the-scenes featurette. The outer slipcover of the Region 1 set was made of a thick cardboard to mimic a bound book. The same set was released with less elaborate packaging in Region 2 on March 7, 2005, and in Region 4 on May 11, 2005.

Carnivàle: The Complete Second Season was released as a widescreen six-disc Region 1 DVD box set on July 18, 2006, in Region 2 on August 7, 2006, and in Region 4 on October 4, 2006. Each of these releases was distributed by HBO Home Video and contained three audio commentaries, on-stage interviews of the cast and producers, a featurette about the mythology of the series, and four short "Creating the Scene" segments about the concept, inspiration and execution process.

== Reception ==
=== Ratings ===
Carnivàle aired on HBO on a Sunday 9:00 pm timeslot during its two-season run between 2003 and 2005. "Milfay", Carnivàle's pilot episode, drew 5.3 million viewers for its premiere on September 14, 2003. This marked the best ever debut for an HBO original series at the time, caused in part by the established HBO series Sex and the City being Carnivàle's lead-in. This record was broken on March 21, 2004, by HBO series Deadwood, which debuted with 5.8 million viewers as the lead-out of The Sopranos.

Viewership dropped to 3.49 million for Carnivàle's second episode but remained stable for the remainder of the season. The final episode of season one finished with 3.5 million viewers on November 30, 2003. Season one averaged 3.54 million viewers and a household rating of 2.41.

Viewership for the second-season premiere on January 9, 2005, was down by two-thirds to 1.81 million. The ratings never recovered to their first-season highs, although the season two finale experienced an upswing with 2.40 million viewers on March 27, 2005. Season 2 averaged 1.7 million viewers, not enough to avert an imminent cancellation.

=== Critical reviews ===
Many early reviews gave Carnivàle good marks but also said its unique characters and story might prevent it from becoming a huge mainstream audience success. Daily Variety TV editor Joseph Adalian predicted that "it will get mostly positive reviews but some people will be put off by the general weirdness of the show." Phil Gallo of Variety described Carnivàle as "an absolute visual stunner with compelling freak show characters—but the series unfortunately takes a leisurely approach toward getting to a point," and Eric Deggans of the St. Petersburg Times suggested that "it's as if executives at the premium cable network want to see how far they can slow a narrative before viewers start tossing their remotes through the screen". James Poniewozik of Time called the first three episodes "frustrating" as well as "spellbinding." Amanda Murray of BBC said "With so little revealed, it's almost impossible to pass judgment on the show—it's hard to tell if this is just good, or going to be great."

Later reviews were able to judge the series based on full seasons. While the acting, set design, costuming, art direction and cinematography continued to be praised, some reviewers disfavored the writing, especially of Season 1, saying "the plot momentum is often virtually non-existent" or as "sometimes gripping but mostly boring." Other reviewers pointed out that Carnivàle may "demand more from its audience than many are willing to invest. [...] Without paying close attention, it's tempting to assume that the show is unnecessarily cryptic and misleading." Carnivàle's story was surveyed as long and complex, "and if you don't start from the beginning, you'll be completely lost." IGN DVD's Matt Casamassina, however, praised the show in two reviews, writing that the "gorgeously surreal" first season "dazzles with unpredictable plot twists and scares", and the "extraordinary" second season was "better fantasy – better entertainment, period – than any show that dares to call itself a competitor."

A significant portion of reviews drew parallels between Carnivàle and David Lynch's 1990s mystery TV series Twin Peaks, a show in which Carnivàle actor Michael J. Anderson had previously appeared. Knauf did not deny a stylistic link and made comparisons to John Steinbeck's novel The Grapes of Wrath. When Lost began to receive major critical attention, Carnivàle and its type of mythological storytelling were compared to Lost's story approach in several instances.

Critical opinion remained divided about Carnivàle in the years after the show's cancellation. Alessandra Stanley of the Australian newspaper The Age remembers Carnivàle as a "smart, ambitious series that move[s] unusual characters around an unfamiliar setting imaginatively and even with grace, but that never quite quit the surly bonds of serial drama." Variety's Brian Lowry remembers the show as "largely a macabre fantasy" that eventually suffered from "its own bleakness and eccentricities". The A.V. Club dwelled on Carnivàle's cliffhanger ending in a piece on unanswered TV questions and called the show "a fantastically rich series with a frustratingly dense mythology".

=== Fandom ===
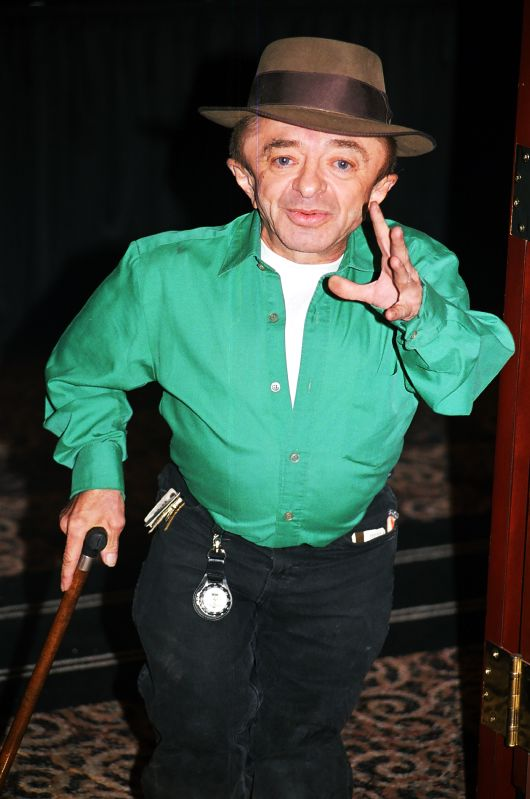
Actor Michael J. Anderson (Samson) at CarnyCon 2006.

Like other cult television shows, Carnivàle gained a respectable following of dedicated viewers. Carnivàle fans referred to themselves as "Carnies" or "Rousties" (roustabouts), terms adopted from the show. Carnivàle's complexity and subliminal mythology spawned dedicated fansites, although most discussion took place on independent internet forums. Show creator Daniel Knauf actively participated in online fandom and offered story- and mythology-related clues. He also gave insight into reasons for Carnivàle's cancellation on a messageboard before speaking to the press.

One year after Carnivàle's cancellation, a major Carnivàle convention called CarnyCon 2006 Live! was organized by fans. It took place in Woodland Hills, California on August 21–23, 2006. Many of the show's cast and crew attended the event and participated in discussion panels, which were recorded and made available on DVD afterwards.

=== Awards ===
Despite its short two-season run, Carnivàle received numerous awards and nominations. The show's inaugural season received nominations for seven Emmy Awards in 2004, winning five including "Outstanding Art Direction For A Single-camera Series" and "Outstanding Costumes For A Series" for the pilot episode "Milfay", "Outstanding Cinematography For A Single-Camera Series" for the episode "Pick A Number", "Outstanding Hairstyling For A Series" for the episode "After the Ball Is Over", and "Outstanding Main Title Design". In 2005, the second season received eight further Emmy nominations without a win.

Other awards include but are not limited to:

- Win – Artios Award: "Best Casting for TV, Dramatic Pilot", 2004
- Win – VES Award: "Outstanding Special Effects in Service to Visual Effects in a Televised Program, Music Video or Commercial", 2004
- Win – Costume Designers Guild Award: "Excellence in Costume Design for Television – Period/Fantasy", 2005
- Nominated – two Golden Reel Awards, 2003
- Nominated – two Saturn Awards, 2004
- Nominated – two VES Awards, 2004
- Nominated – Costume Designers Guild Award, 2005

=== International reception and broadcasters ===
HBO president Chris Albrecht said Carnivàle was "not a big show for foreign [distribution]," but did not go into more detail. Reviews however indicate that the show's cryptic mythology and inaccessibility to the casual viewer were major factors. Nevertheless, Carnivàle was sold to several foreign networks and was distributed to HBO channels abroad. The DVD releases of Carnivàle extended the availability of the show further.

== Lawsuit ==
On June 9, 2005, a lawsuit was filed in the United States District Court for the Northern District of California by Los Angeles writer Jeff Bergquist. He claimed that the creators of Carnivàle did not originate the idea for the show, but rather stole it from his unpublished novel Beulah, a quirky drama set amid a traveling carnival during the Depression that Bergquist had been working on since the 1980s. Bergquist sought both monetary damages and an injunction preventing HBO from distributing or airing Carnivàle any further. HBO and Daniel Knauf denied the claims of copyright infringement as having "absolutely no merit."
