= Laurence Mason =

American actor

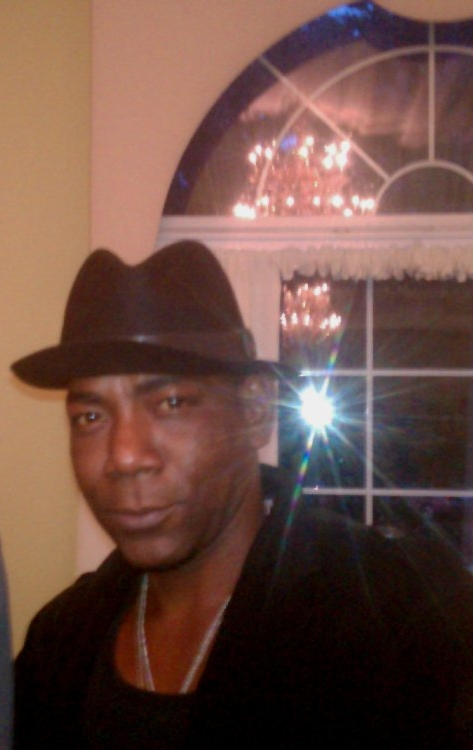
- Mason in 2016
- Born: 1969 or 1970 (age 55–56); New York City, U.S.
- Occupation: Actor
- Years active: 1992–present

Laurence Mason (born 1969 or 1970) is an American stage, film and television actor. He is best known for his roles as Tin-Tin in the 1994 film The Crow, Lord Nikon in the 1995 film Hackers, Sammy Norino on the Fox drama Prison Break, Luis Sarria in the 2001 film Ali, Halpern White on the FX crime drama The Shield, and Earl Briggs, the chauffeur in the film The Lincoln Lawyer.

== Early life ==
Mason was born in the Bronx, New York City, to parents from Trinidad. As a youth, he was a member of the First All Children's Theater in Manhattan, the nation's first children's repertory company. Mason is a graduate of the High School of Performing Arts in Manhattan.

== Career ==
He has performed in a number of productions at the Harold Clurman Theatre and the Nuyorican Poets Café, including appearing in commercials, hip hop music videos, voice over work and a stint on One Life to Live. His first feature film was True Romance (under Tony Scott). Soon after, he landed a role in The Crow with the late Brandon Lee and Hackers along with Angelina Jolie. He has had recurring roles on The Shield and Prison Break.

== Filmography ==
Year	Title	Role	Notes
1993	Joey Breaker	Lester White	
1993	New York Cop	Danny Boy	
1993	True Romance	'Floyd D'	
1994	The Crow	Tin Tin	
1995	Parallel Sons	Knowledge Johnson	
1995	The Keeper	Jordi	
1995	Hackers	Lord Nikon	
1998	Side Streets	Dennis	
2001	A.I. Artificial Intelligence	Tech Director	
2001	Behind Enemy Lines	Captain Glen Brandon	
2001	Ali	Luis Sarria	
2004	Fronterz		
2007	The Take	Curtis Fellows	
2009	JoJo	JoJo	Short
2009	Public Enemies	Porter at Union Station	
2010	Detention	Officer Straw	Short
2011	The Lincoln Lawyer	Earl	
2011	Killer on the Loose		Short
2013	Runner Runner	Governor	Uncredited
2014	Stitch	Pirino	
2014	Red Butterfly	Dutch Fred	
2018	City of Lies	Dunton	
2025	Tin Soldier	Shinja John	

=== Television ===
Year	Title	Role	Note
1992	Hardcore TV	Rastaman	
1993	Law & Order	Roach	Episode: "Born Bad"
1994	Lifestories: Families in Crisis	Sergio	Episode: "POWER:The Eddie Matos Story"
1996	New York Undercover	Cornell Walker	Episode: "Kill the Noise"
1998	Homicide: Life on the Street	Dennis Rigby	Episode: "Sins of the Father"
2000	Profiler	Billy	Episode: "House of Cards"
2000	Judging Amy	Johnson	Episode: "Zero Tolerance"
2000	The District	James Powerswell	Episode: "Dirty Laundry"
2002	JAG	Lt. Flavin	Episode: "Odd Man Out"
2002	First Monday		Episode: "Crime and Punishment"
1997, 2003	NYPD Blue	Gordo / Crow Taylor	Episode: "Bad Rap" Episode "Bottoms Up"
2004	CSI: Miami	Maurice Dushamp	Episode: "Invasion"
2005	Threshold	Sheriff Fogel	Episode: " The Burning"
2005–06	The Shield	Halpern White	8 episodes
2007	In Case of Emergency	Bill	2 episodes
2007	Burn Notice	Andre Dekker	Episode: "Unpaid Debts"
2007–08	Prison Break	Sammy Norino	10 episodes
2011	Breakout Kings	Born Again Gangster	Episode: "Queen of Hearts"
2012	Prime Suspect	Frank	Episode: "Stuck in the Middle with You"
2012	The Good Wife	Jeremy Levitas	Episode: "Long Way Home"
2012	Person of Interest	Doctor	Episode: "Matsya Nyaya"
2015	Gotham	Detective Ben Mueller	Episode: "Under the Knife"
2016	Daredevil	Star	Episode: "The Dark at the End of the Tunnel"

=== Video games ===
Year	Title	Role	Notes
2000	Shadow Watch	Archer	Voice
2006	Tom Clancy's Splinter Cell: Double Agent		Voice
