= Parallel Sons =

- Theatrical release poster
- Directed by: John G. Young
- Written by: John G. Young
- Produced by: Nancy Larsen; James Spione
- Starring: Gabriel Mann; Laurence Mason
- Cinematography: Matthew M. Howe
- Edited by: James Spione; John G. Young
- Music by: Emile Menasche
- Distributed by: Greycat Films
- Release date: November 7, 1996
- Running time: 93 minutes
- Country: United States
- Language: English

Parallel Sons is a 1995 gay-themed drama film, written and directed by John G. Young and starring Gabriel Mann and Laurence Mason. It premiered at the 1995 Sundance Film Festival.

== Plot ==
Seth is a youth with artistic leanings, a rural white young man with a fascination with black pop culture, and a dead-end life in an Adirondack village. He's alternatively sensitive and brutal with Kristen, who wants a sexual relationship that he explosively rejects.

Late one night, as he's closing the cafe where he works, a young black man, called Knowledge, attempts to rob him at gun point, but faints from illness. Seth takes the man, who is an escapee from a nearby local youthful offender boot camp. He nurses him in a family cabin and they begin a tentative friendship. When the sheriff learns of Seth's harboring a fugitive, a confrontation looms. Relationships between fathers and their children dominate the subplots

== Cast ==
- Gabriel Mann as Seth Carlson
- Laurence Mason as Knowledge Johnson
- Murphy Guyer as Sheriff Mott
- Graham Alex Johnson as Peter Carlson
- Heather Gottlieb as Kristen Mott
- Josh Hopkins as Marty
- Maureen Shannon as Francine
- Julia Weldon as Sally Carlson
- Eric Granger as Police Officer

== Awards and nominations ==
- Won the Audience Award for "Best Feature" at the Frameline Film Festival (the San Francisco International Lesbian and Gay Film Festival).
- Won Grand Jury Award at Outfest (L.A. Outfest).
- Won Best Feature Award at Florida Film Festival.
- Nominated for the Grand Jury Prize at Sundance Film Festival.
