= Murder of a Cat =

2014 film by Gillian Greene

- Theatrical release poster
- Directed by: Gillian Greene
- Written by: Christian Magalhaes; Robert Snow
- Produced by: Molly Hassell; Sam Raimi; Gillian Greene; Ivan Orlic
- Starring: Fran Kranz; Nikki Reed; J. K. Simmons; Blythe Danner; Greg Kinnear
- Cinematography: Christophe Lanzenberg
- Edited by: Eric L. Beason
- Music by: Deborah Lurie
- Production companies: BabyItsColdOutside Pictures; Seine Pictures; Hassell-Free Productions
- Distributed by: Gravitas Ventures
- Release dates: April 24, 2014 (Tribeca); December 5, 2014 (United States)
- Running time: 94 minutes
- Country: United States
- Language: English

Murder of a Cat is a 2014 American comedy thriller film directed by Gillian Greene and starring Fran Kranz, Nikki Reed, J. K. Simmons, Dileep Rao, Blythe Danner, and Greg Kinnear. The film premiered at the 2014 Tribeca Film Festival, and was given a limited theatrical release in the United States on December 5, 2014, by Gravitas Ventures.

This was Greene's second collaboration with Kranz, Rao, and Simmons. The first was her directorial debut short film Fanboy. The film is also the Raimi brothers' second film with Simmons, after the Spider-Man trilogy (2002–2007), and their second film with Rao, after Drag Me to Hell (2009).

== Synopsis ==
When someone murders his beloved cat, Clinton demands justice. Taking it upon himself to solve the case, he teams up with an unlikely ally, Greta, and the two set out to find the culprit lurking in their small suburban town. However, as Clinton searches for the truth, he begins to uncover a conspiracy that goes far deeper than he anticipated.

== Cast ==
- Fran Kranz as Clinton
- Nikki Reed as Greta
- Greg Kinnear as Al Ford
- J. K. Simmons as Sheriff Hoyle
- Leonardo Nam as Yi Kim
- Blythe Danner as Edie
- Ted Raimi as Young Sheriff
- Dileep Rao as Doctor Mundhra
- Brian Turk as Dave Calvetti

== Production ==
The screenplay was on the Hollywood "Black List" survey in 2010. In August 2012, Fran Kranz replaced Jay Baruchel in the lead role. The film was shot on location in Los Angeles in 2013 by Seine Pictures and Raimi Productions.

== Reception ==
On Rotten Tomatoes the film has an approval rating of 30%. On Metacritic it has a score of 31 out of 100 based on reviews from 8 critics, indicating "generally unfavorable reviews". Kranz took a lot of the criticism along with Greene's direction.
