= Steben Twins =

Canadian twin trapeze artists

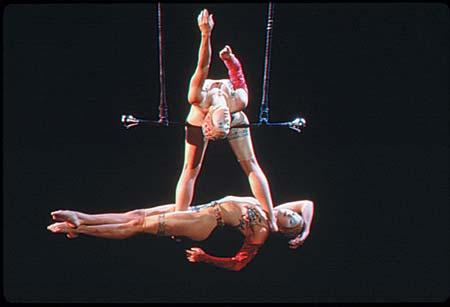
- Born: Karyne & Sarah Steben; July 26, 1974 (age 52); Montreal, Quebec, Canada
- Known for: trapeze duo
- Website: www.stebentwins.com

Karyne and Sarah Steben, also known as the Steben Twins (born July 26, 1974), are Canadian twin trapeze artists. The pair were the first female innovators of the feet-to-feet catching technique.

== Early life ==
Third-generation Italian Canadians, Karyne and Sarah Steben grew up becoming skillful at gymnastics, trampoline, dance and theater. At the age of six, they signed to do a television series Les Satellipopettes in Quebec with their father Claude Steben, the show's host. Their travels began during these early years, when they visited more than 22 countries, learned to speak French, German, English and Spanish, and participated in festivals in Sweden, Italy, France and Russia.

== Career ==
Their skill and unique talents led Karyne and Sarah to create an original and innovative act at the 1992 Cirque de Demain Festival in Paris, France. It won them their first gold medal. The girls joined Cirque du Soleil as the featured trapeze act in Saltimbanco, and toured the United States and Canada with the production for two years. Following the tour, the twins played the prestigious Tigerpalast cabaret in Frankfurt, Germany; won a Gold Ring Award at the First International Festival of Circus in Geneva, Italy, and received the YTV Achievement Award, honoring Canadian youth and excellence. Then came a feature role in the Patricia Rozema film, When Night Is Falling, starring Pascale Bussières.

In October 1995, Karyne and Sarah rejoined Cirque du Soleil for the European tour of Saltimbanco and three months later performed in the prestigious International Circus Festival of Monte-Carlo, hosted by Monaco's Rainier III, Prince of Monaco. Here they accepted the Silver Crown Award. Only months later they presented their act at the G-7 Summit, for an audience that included the heads of state of the world's seven richest countries. In 1998, they moved to Las Vegas, Nevada, to perform in Cirque du Soleil's water-themed production, O, at the Bellagio Hotel.

Following Vegas, Karyne and Sarah traveled to Italy to act and dance in a European TV special for Rai Uno, hosted by Adriano Celentano. Since their return to the United States and their arrival in Los Angeles in 2000, Karyne and Sarah have participated in the creation of Madonna's 2001 Drowned World Tour, and were featured in several commercials and a variety of music videos, including working with Aerosmith. In addition to continuing their appearances in cabarets and festivals throughout the world, they recently worked with Bill Viola for The Passions exposition at the Getty Museum. They then auditioned for Robert Lepage to be the main characters of "KA" show at the MGM resort and, despite being the first choice, they had to refuse the offer because they were on a 5-year contract with HBO for the TV show Carnivàle. They then performed with the Teatro ZinZanni in San Francisco and Seattle for 2 1/2 years and finally performed in 4 continents with the show LE NOIR - The Dark Side of Cirque.

They appeared in the 2013 film Much Ado About Nothing, directed by Joss Whedon.

In 2024 they are invited for a masterclass at Idyllwild Arts Academy. The twins share their experience of creative process, how to create unique content, keep it alive and work in partnership with other creatives to have a fulfilled career in the art world for a long time.

== Performances ==
- The twins performed a total of 16 years as a featured act for Cirque du Soleil (O and Saltimbanco).
- They played the Tiger Palast cabaret in Frankfurt Germany.
- They were part of Bill Viola’s art work Wagner’s "Tristan and Isolde"where featured as(Isolde)on the video backdrop to the orchestra.
- Sarah was featured in Bill Viola's piecesEmergence, Martyrs
- They also performed with the circus dinner theatre Teatro ZinZanni in San Francisco and Seattle.
- They were series regulars on HBO's dramatic series, Carnivàle.
- They were in 2012 in the movie Much Ado About Nothing directed by Joss Whedon

★In When Night Is Falling a love story drama film directed by Patricia Rozema and starring Pascale Bussières and Rachael Crawford. It was entered into the 45th Berlin International Film Festival

== Awards ==
- 1992 Gold medal at the Cirque de Demain Festival in Paris
- 1994 Gold medal at the "Festival of Circus in Geneva"
- 1995 Silver Clown at the International Circus Festival of Monte-Carlo
- Silver Crown at the Circus Princessann in Stockholm
