= Lie Down With Dogs =

- Directed by: Wally White
- Written by: Wally White
- Produced by: Carijn Lau; Jennifer Ryan Cohen; Eli Kabillio; Wally White
- Starring: Wally White; Bash Halow; James Sexton; Darren Dryden; Ty-Ranne Grimstad; Randy Becker
- Cinematography: George Mitas
- Edited by: Hart F. Faber
- Music by: Jellybean Benitez
- Distributed by: Miramax
- Release date: 1995
- Running time: 84 minutes
- Country: United States
- Language: English

Lie Down With Dogs is a 1995 directorial debut comedy feature film written, directed, produced and starring Wally White.

The film was screened at the Berlin International Film Festival and was distributed by Miramax.

== Plot ==
Tommie, a gay New Yorker, travels to Provincetown for a vacation with the philosophy, "Be gay, let the guilt go."

== Critical reception ==
Variety wrote "Certainly "Dogs" is no "Longtime Companion," but in his eagerness to please, White has come up with an amateurish, slapdash pic that is, frankly, pretty boring," adding "White delivers an eager, amiable screen persona, but hardly anyone else in the cast registers."

Caryn James of The New York Times said ""Lie Down With Dogs" resembles a film-school exercise, an apprentice work filled with pseudo-arty visual images and humor that strains to be clever," and in regards to director Wally White's lead performance "As Tommie, Mr. White talks straight into the camera, but he is an unnatural actor."

Conversely, Kevin Thomas from the Los Angeles Times called Lie Down With Dogs "A bittsweet awakening," writing "In his wry, jaunty “Lie Down With Dogs,” Wally White immediately dispenses with the twin expectations of gay filmmakers: to be politically correct and/or pornographic."

SFGate in its review also described Lie Down With Dogs as a "jaunty, low-budget first feature," and that lead actor Wally White "has a bubbly juvenile appeal as the restless Tommie."
