= The Incredibly True Adventure of Two Girls in Love =

- Theatrical release poster
- Directed by: Maria Maggenti
- Written by: Maria Maggenti
- Produced by: Dolly Hall
- Starring: Laurel Holloman; Nicole Ari Parker; Maggie Moore; Dale Dickey
- Cinematography: Tami Reiker
- Edited by: Susan Graef
- Music by: Terry Dame
- Production company: Smash Pictures
- Distributed by: Fine Line Features
- Release date: June 16, 1995 (United States)
- Running time: 94 minutes
- Country: United States
- Language: English
- Budget: $250,000
- Box office: $2.2 million

The Incredibly True Adventure of Two Girls in Love is a 1995 American comedy-drama film written and directed by Maria Maggenti and starring Laurel Holloman, Nicole Ari Parker, and Maggie Moore. It tells the story of two very different high school girls who fall in love with each other.

== Plot ==
Randy Dean is a 17-year-old student in her final year with poor grades, only one friend—Frank, a gay Latino—secret cigarette and marijuana habits, and a cashier's job at a gas station with fellow worker Regina. Shunned by other students for her tomboyish personality and appearance, she spends most of her free time either by herself or in illicit meetings with her romantic partner Wendy, a married woman who drops by the gas station when it pleases her, even though Randy knows they are in a dead-end relationship. Her mother having abandoned her to devote her life to the anti-abortion movement, Randy lives with her lesbian aunt Rebecca and her girlfriend Vicky, as well as Rebecca's ex-girlfriend Lena, who has no place to stay and is living with them until she finds somewhere else she can go to.

One day Evie Roy stops in a pristine Range Rover, unsure if her tires need air. Randy recognizes her from school and talks to her for the first time. Evie is an only child living with her well-off, cultured mother, Evelyn, who has a difficult relationship with her remarried husband. Randy and Evie start passing notes in school and hanging out with each other, although Evie does not reveal this to her cliquish friends. During this time, Randy is approached by Wendy's jealous husband Ali at the gas station, who grabs Randy and warns her to stay away from his wife. Randy spends much of her time with Evie hanging out in meadows, trading music (opera and Mozart from Evie, punk rock from Randy) and talking. When Wendy next visits her, Randy rejects her, telling her she has a new girlfriend, Evie.

Evie breaks up with her boyfriend Hayjay after he complains of her distant attitude towards him. Later, apparently on a spur of the moment, she lends Randy a copy of Walt Whitman’s Leaves of Grass, which Randy starts to devour. Inviting Evie to her family’s small house for dinner one evening, Randy reveals to her that she has lived with Rebecca and Vicky since Randy's devoutly religious mother abandoned her to devote all her time to an Operation Rescue-like group. On the front steps of Rebecca's house, they kiss for the first time. Evie records it in her diary later, apparently wondering what it all means.

Randy and Evie experiment with how "out" they can be as lesbians, nervously holding hands at a local diner. Remembering Randy’s warning of how intolerant the town can be, Evie nevertheless breaks the news to her three closest friends. One girl is supportive (if confused), but the other two are hostile to the idea, with one of them saying, “God, Evie, if you were gonna turn gay you think you could at least choose someone who’s pretty.” before they all leave, including the supportive friend. Meanwhile, Randy's grades continue to plummet and the school warns her she will not graduate; Randy hides this information from Rebecca. When Evie's mother leaves on a business trip, the girls take the opportunity to cook a huge meal, indulging in wine and marijuana. That night, they make love, then fall asleep in Evie's mother's bed.

The next morning, it is Evie's 18th birthday; Evelyn returns prematurely with presents for her, but is shocked by the mess in the kitchen and the rest of the house. Furiously searching the upstairs, she discovers Evie and Randy, but only realizes Randy is a girl when she runs past her on her way out. Rebecca, who has learned that Randy will not be graduating high school, goes to Frank's house with Vicky and Lena, where Randy had told them she would be staying the night. Rebecca threatens Frank until, panicked, he turns over Evie's phone number. She calls, but Evie and Randy have already absconded and she is left talking to a furious Evelyn.

Evie and Randy, crying, scared and accusatory, take refuge in a motel. Randy finally calls Wendy, who comes out, pays for the room and tries to comfort the girls. Ali sees her car in the parking lot, however, and comes bursting in, eventually attracting Evelyn, Rebecca, Vicky, Lena, Frank, and Evie's three friends, who were driving past reading aloud from Rita Mae Brown’s Rubyfruit Jungle (apparently still processing Evie’s news). The movie ends with Randy and Evie kissing and hugging in the open motel room doorway while everyone else argues in the background at top volume.

== Cast ==
- Laurel Holloman as Randall "Randy" Dean
- Nicole Ari Parker as Evelyn "Evie" Roy Jr.
- Maggie Moore as Wendy
- Kate Stafford as Rebecca
- Sabrina Artel as Vicky
- Nelson Rodríguez as Frank
- Dale Dickey as Regina
- Katlin Tyler as girl #1
- Anna Padgett as girl #2
- Chelsea Cattouse as girl #3
- John Elsen as Ali
- Stephanie Berry as Evelyn Roy
- Toby Poser as Lena
- Andrew Wright as Hayjay
- Babs Davy as waitress
- Lillian Kiesler as old lady #1
- Maryette Charlton as old lady #2

== Production ==
In 1992, Maria Maggenti started a script with an image in her head of a tomboy with love notes in her back pocket, gradually adding more characters such as the tomboy's family and her love interest. Later, she realized this character was based on her first girlfriend. Maggenti's script, which originated as "a very dark story of teenage sexuality and [teenagers'] relationship to adults", grew until Maggenti briefly abandoned it in 1994.

However, the film's future associate producer, Melissa Painter, convinced Maggenti to shop the story around as an independent film. Two producers wanted a pivotal element of the two love interests being from very different paths, so Maggenti added a scene that established the beginning of the girls' relationship. The producers were delighted with this, so Maggenti wrote a new script which she finished in eight days. She found she had surprised herself in that her script was now a comedic farce; the story was not about gay love or coming out, but about first love between teenagers.

Shooting was completed in 21 days during the summer of 1994. Scenes taking place at Randy and Evie's high school were filmed in divisions of Horace Mann School, in the Riverdale neighborhood of the Bronx.

Of the film's ending being likened by audiences to a Hollywood romantic comedy, Maggenti said, "A lot of people have mentioned to me that the shot looks like a marriage portrait… That final shot is actually a very ambivalent shot, leaving them at the threshold of adulthood, a relationship, their families, everything."

== Release ==
The Incredibly True Adventure of Two Girls in Love debuted at the 1995 Sundance Film Festival on January 23, 1995 to good reviews. It was then given a limited theatrical release in the United States on June 16, 1995. It was also theatrically released in Australia on March 28, 1996, and in the UK on September 10, 1996.

== Critical reception ==
On Rotten Tomatoes, the film holds a rating of 77% from 22 reviews.

Roger Ebert of the Chicago Sun-Times gave the film three stars out of four and said it is "warm-hearted, funny, and involving" and "the two leads are well-cast." Ebert lambasted the MPAA for giving the film an R rating for a love scene between two young women, arguing "a [similar love scene] between a boy and a girl wouldn't have qualified for the word 'strong'; the MPAA is shocked by the homosexuality. The R rating is ironic when you reflect how much healthier and more thoughtful this film is than so much mindless, action-oriented 'family entertainment,' and how likely it is to inspire conversation about its values."

Writing for Spin, Manohla Dargis said "Two Girls in Love, charming and lighter than air, is a film that could easily be mistaken for an after-school special, save for one crucial point: the high-school sweethearts in this valentine are all woman."

The film won a GLAAD Media Award for Outstanding Film – Limited Release in 1996. Its success launched the film careers of lead actresses Laurel Holloman, Nicole Ari Parker and Dale Dickey.

== Home media ==
After many years of the DVD for The Incredibly True Adventure of Two Girls in Love being out-of-print, the film was digitally restored in 2022 with the assistance of the Sundance Institute and Strand Releasing. It was released on Blu-ray format on March 15, 2022. Its re-release was also screened at the 2022 Sundance Film Festival's digital platform. It has been added to The Criterion Channel's streaming lineup. On June 18, 2024, it was released on Netflix in the US for Pride Month.

== See also ==
- List of LGBT films directed by women
