= Randy Becker =

American actor and producer (born 1970)

- Born: United States
- Citizenship: United States
- Occupation: Producer/Lit Manager
- Spouse: Jinna Matzen (since 2007)
- Children: Aidan Becker; Ciera Ramirez

Randy Becker (born June 6, 1970) is an Emmy-nominated producer, literary manager and former American stage, television and film actor.

Becker was best known for such productions as Love! Valour! Compassion!, Lie Down With Dogs in 1995, Sabrina and Jack & Jill and for producing The Great Debate with Charles Barkley in 2022 (Emmy-nominated).

In 1995 Becker had an epileptic seizure on stage while performing in Love! Valour! Compassion! Becker's understudy finished the performance.

== Early life and career ==
Randy Becker is a graduate of Brown University. He was born in Cleveland, Ohio, moved to the Netherlands until he was 7 years old, then spent the rest of his childhood in Bloomfield Hills, Michigan, before going off to Brown University and then New York City to pursue a career in acting. He began his career in the entertainment industry as an actor, starring on Broadway in Love! Valour! Compassion! (Tony Award-winner) as well the Off-Broadway hit Tony and Tina's Wedding, and on film and television, before transitioning into literary representation and film/tv producing.

After leaving acting in 2001, he partnered to form Acuna Entertainment (AE), a literary management and film production company. AE's mission was to transition writers to filmmakers by giving them a chance to direct their own work. AE shared writer clients with Hollywood agencies like CAA, ICM, WME, and APA, sold film and TV to the major studios and networks, and helped raise independent capital to give their literary clients a chance to direct their own films. He helped shepherd indie films by AE clients like Lila & Eve (starring Jennifer Lopez and Viola Davis), Touched (starring Jenna Elfman), and The Great Buck Howard (starring John Malkovich, Emily Blunt, and Tom Hanks).

Randy went off on his own in 2009, launching NexTV Entertainment, a literary management and consulting company where he worked closely with accomplished film/TV writers, New York Times best-selling authors (HM Ward, Liliana Hart), and creative entrepreneurs. He also helped emerging writers and filmmakers break into the business with a series of industry-connected competitions. In 2010, he launched the Social Impact Conference (The Social Impact Conference & Expo | Entertainment & Activism: Hollywood in Action), a yearly event that brought together artists, activists, business leaders and studio executives to discuss and find unique solutions for the day's issues. Panelists included studio presidents, Nobel Prize winners and celebrated producers, directors, writers and actors.

In 2019 Randy partnered with William Roetzheim to help him pivot his poetry publishing company, Level 4 Press, towards fiction. More specifically, to create a publishing company focused solely on books intended for film and television adaptation. Randy added a literary management division, Level 4 Management to Level 4 Press, bringing a group of long-time clients including Darnell Brown (Mike – Hulu) and Branyon Davis (Assisted Living, House of Payne – BET). And in 2022, helped William launch Level 4 Films, the film and television division of Level 4, designed to exploit film and television rights from the growing book library of Level 4 Press.

Since 2020, Randy has helped Level 4 literary clients make deals with MGM, Warner Bros. Television, Disney+, 20th Television, HBO, BET, Tyler Perry Studios, TNT, Amazon Studios, CBS Studios, Hulu, ABC Signature, and Audible Originals.

In 2022, Randy produced, along with basketball legend Charles Barkley, the Emmy-nominated documentary, The Great Debate with Charles Barkley (starring Charles Barkley, Spike Lee, Renee Montgomery) for TNT. A film that told the story of the six greatest players in NBA history, broken by era.

Official websites: www.level4press.com, www.level4-management.com, The Social Impact Conference & Expo | Entertainment & Activism: Hollywood in Action
