= Christiane Lemm =

German actor

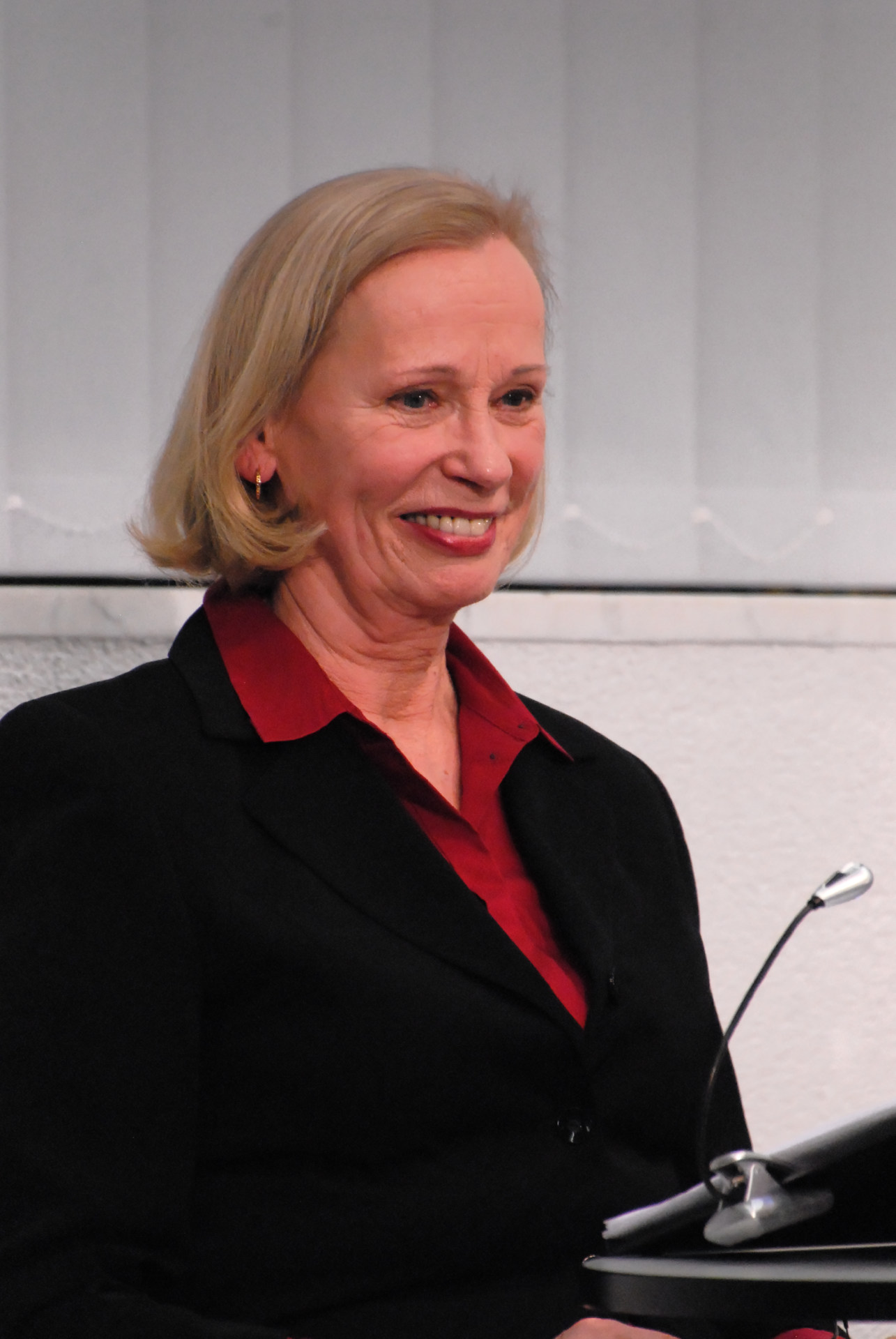
- Lemm in 2017
- Born: 1953 (age 72–73); Berlin, Germany
- Occupation: Actor
- Awards: See Awards and nominations
- Website: Official website (in German)

Christiane Lemm (born 1953 in Berlin) is a German actor living in Düsseldorf, North Rhine-Westphalia.

== Life and career ==
Lemm is a native of Berlin. From 1968 to 1971 she completed her acting training at the Max-Reinhardt-Schule für Schauspiel (today: Berlin University of the Arts) in Berlin.

From 1996 Lemm worked as a freelance actress; she had for her theater work piece contracts and guest contracts at various theaters like Hessisches Staatstheater Wiesbaden (1997) and at Euro-Studio Landgraf (2001).

In the 2009/10 season she played the role of landowner Lyubow Andrejewna Ranjewskaja in The Cherry Orchard at the Theater des Capucins in Luxembourg. In 2010/2011 she appeared at the Freilichtspiele Schwäbisch Hall as Claire Zachanassian in Friedrich Dürrenmatt's tragic comedy The Visit of the Old Lady. In the 2010/11 season she appeared again at the Schlosstheater Celle, this time as Hekabe in Der Untergang by Walter Jens.

== Awards and nominations ==
In 1974 Lemm received the Förderpreis des Landes Nordrhein-Westfalen für junge Künstlerinnen und Künstler. In the annual critics poll of the magazine Theater heute she received a total of four nominations for „Schauspielerin des Jahres“.

== Filmography (selection) ==
- 1970: Bambule (TV film)
- 1979: Martha und Laura auf See (TV film)
- 1979: Der Tote bin ich (TV film)
- 1983: Ziemlich weit weg (cinema film)
- 1984: Ein Fall für zwei (TV series; episode: Chemie eines Mordes)
- 1984: Tatort (TV series; episode: Täter und Opfer)
- 1985: Tatort (TV series; episode: Das Haus im Wald)
- 1986: Die Montagsfamilie (TV series)
- 1987: Das andere Leben (TV film)
- 1989: Hab' ich nur deine Liebe (cinema film)
- 1991: Großstadtrevier (TV series; episode: Tod auf Raten)
- 1991: Verurteilt: Anna Leschek (TV film)
- 1992: Gossenkind (cinema film)
- 1993: Pauline In Between (cinema film)
- 1993: Domenica (cinema film)
- 1993: Tisch und Bett (TV series)
- 1995: Is Mausi Coming Out? (TV film)
- 1996: Stadtklinik (TV series; two episodes)
- 1998: Der Fahnder (TV series; episode: Blutiges Geld)
- 1998: Tatort (TV series; episode: Engelchen flieg)
- 2000–2001: Die Rettungsflieger (serial roll)
- 2003: Mein Leben & Ich (TV series; episode: Alles wird anders; Teil 1)
- 2003: In the Shadow of Power (two-part TV film)
- 2004: Hitler Cantata (cinema film)
- 2005: Unsolved (TV series; episode: Verlorene Jahre)
- 2006: SOKO Köln (TV series; episode: Die Spur des Jägers)
- 2007: Post Mortem – Beweise sind unsterblich (TV series; episode: Alte Wunden)
- 2010: Verhältnisse (TV film)
- 2010: SOKO Stuttgart (TV series; episode: Tödliche Heilung)
- 2010: Die letzten 30 Jahre (TV film)
- 2012: Das Hochzeitsvideo (cinema film)
- 2012: Rote Rosen (TV series; serial roll)
- 2013: Marie Brand und die Engel des Todes (TV film)
- 2014: Danni Lowinski (TV series; episode: Verrat)
- 2015: The Two Twins (TV film)
