= Murphy Guyer =

American dramatist

- Born: December 25, 1952 (age 73); Dover, Delaware, U.S.
- Education: American Academy of Dramatic Arts
- Occupations: Playwright; actor; writer; director

Murphy Guyer (born December 25, 1952) is an American actor, playwright, writer and director, best known for his plays and for appearances in the films The Devil's Advocate (1997), The Jackal (1997), Arthur (2011) and Joker (2019).

== Early years ==
Murphy Guyer was born in Dover, Delaware, and grew up in rural eastern Maryland. He moved to New York City at the age of nineteen to attend the American Academy of Dramatic Arts on an acting scholarship, and soon discovered a talent for writing jokes and comic sketches. He began his professional career writing for various stand-up comics and improv groups.

== Career ==
In the early 1980s, Guyer's first play Eden Court premiered at the Humana Festival of New American Plays in Louisville, Kentucky. The play was later produced on Broadway and made into a film. During the course of his career, Guyer has written works for stage, screen and radio, and tends to farce and satire. His plays have been produced Off-Broadway and at regional theaters in the US, Canada, Ireland, Britain, Europe and Russia. His play The Realists was listed as one of the Best Plays of 1988-1989, and his adaptation of The Emancipation of Valet de Chambre was noted as one of the Best Plays of 1999-2000.

In 1991 Guyer began acting in TV and films, with his first appearance as Tommy Gallagher in the Law & Order episode "Heaven." Between 1996 and 2003, Guyer served as Associate Artistic Director for Playwrighting at the Cleveland Play House.

== Works ==
Selected plays include:

- Eden Court, produced at Actors Theatre of Louisville, Humana Festival, 1982-1983
- The American Century, produced at Actors Theatre of Louisville, Humana Festival, 1984-1985
- The American Century, produced at Solar Stage, Toronto, Canada, 1985
- The Metaphor, produced at Actors Theatre of Louisville, Humana Festival, 1987-1988
- Loyalties, published in 25 Ten-Minute Plays from Actors Theatre of Louisville, 1989, then in 30 Ten-Minute Plays for 4, 5, & 6 Actors from the National Ten-Minute Play Contest, 2001
- The Enchanted Maze, produced at Eugene O'Neill Theater Center, Waterford, CT, 1990
- Rendezvous with Reality, produced in Philadelphia, PA, 1995
- The Interrogation, produced by Subterranean Theatre Company, HydePark Theatre, Austin, TX, 1997
- Russian Romance, produced at Cleveland Play House, Drury Theater, Cleveland, OH, 1998
- The American Century, produced at Theatre of Western Springs, Western Springs, IL, 2000
- World of Mirth, produced at Theater Four, New York City, 2001,
- The Infinite Regress of Human Vanity, produced at Cleveland Play House, 2002

== Filmography ==
=== Film ===
Year	Title	Role	Notes
1995	Parallel Sons	Sheriff Mott	
1996	City Hall	Captain Florian	
1997	Firehouse	Detective Leo Patillo	Television film
1997	Lewis & Clark: The Journey of the Corps of Discovery	William Clark	Documentary film
1997	Love Walked In	Howard's Boss	
1997	The Peacemaker	INS Agent	
1997	The Devil's Advocate	Barbara's Father	
1997	The Jackal	NSC Representative	
1998	Rounders	Sergeant Detweiler	
2004	She Hate Me	John Erlichman	
2005	La fiesta del Chivo	Turk	
2009	The Mercy Man	Leary	
2011	Arthur	Officer Kaplan	
2015	Good Friday	Paul Chasse	
2017	Wetlands	Captain Schmidt	
2017	Wonderstruck	Security Chief	
2018	Paterno	Gary Schultz	Television film
2019	Joker	Barry O'Donnell	
2024	Joker: Folie à Deux	White Chapel Minister	

=== Television ===
Year	Title	Role	Notes
1991	Law & Order	Tommy Gallagher	Episode: "Heaven"
1996	The City	Darryl Hassey	4 episodes
1997	Oz	CO Eddie Hunt	4 episodes
2010	Rubicon	R.C. Gilbert	5 episodes
2011	Mildred Pierce	Mr. Pierce	5 episodes
2013–2016	House of Cards	Oren Chase	2 episodes
2016	The Blacklist	Eye in the Sky	2 episodes
2016	Billions	Chief Mueller	1 episode
2020	NOS4A2	FBI Agent Daltry	2 episodes
2020	The Right Stuff	Cooper's CO	1 episode

=== Videogames ===
Year	Title	Role
2006	Neverwinter Nights 2	Ammon Jerro
2010	Red Dead Redemption	Aquila
2016	Batman: The Telltale Series	Police Commissioner James Gordon
2017–2018	Batman: The Enemy Within	Police Commissioner James Gordon
