= Sabrina Artel's Trailer Talk =

- Country of origin: United States
- Language(s): English
- Home station: WJFF
- Starring: Sabrina Artel
- Website: www.sabrinaartel.com

Sabrina Artel's Trailer Talk is combination live performance, community event, and radio broadcast based in the New York's Catskills region. With her vintage 1965 Beeline travel trailer, Sabrina Artel travels to festivals and events where she invites individuals to participate in what she calls a "public conversation" in a relaxed and comfortable setting. These conversations are broadcast live through speakers mounted outside the trailer and many interviews are later aired on public radio station Radio Catskill WJFF-FM where Sabrina is a regular producer. The New York Times article A 1965 Trailer Goes on the Road, and Catskill Residents Go on the Air described Sabrina Artel's Trailer Talk as "an unusual blend of theater, activism and broadcast journalism."

Although the conversation ranges widely from politics, arts and culture to the environment, agriculture, community development and recreation, Sabrina Artel's emphasis is consistently on localism and the contribution of individuals to their communities.

Podcasts of the program from 2018 through today are available online in the WJFF Archive at https://archive.wjffradio.org/.

Between 2011 and 2013 Sabrina Artel was a regular contributing writer to AlterNet.org.

Sabrina Artel is a stage and screen actress with many credits including the film, The Incredibly True Adventure of Two Girls in Love.

== Notable guests ==
In addition to many local townspeople, a number of famous personalities have been guests around the kitchen table in Sabrina Artel's trailer: singer Joan Osborne, television show host Rosie O'Donnell, activist historian, Allan Berube, John Adams, founder of the Natural Resources Defense Council, Arianna Huffington, choreographer Elizabeth Streb, and Laura Flanders, author of Bushwomen.

== Recognition and awards ==
Sabrina Artel's Trailer Talk has been featured on CNN and in The New York Times as well as Huffpost Green, RV Travel Magazine, The Towne Crier newspaper (Livingston Manor, NY), The River Reporter (Narrowburg, NY), The Times Herald Record, The Sullivan County Democrat (Callicoon, NY), and Hudson Valley Inside Out magazine (Athens, NY), The Shale Reporter.

Sabrina Artel's Trailer Talk was awarded a Puffin Foundation grant in 2007 and a NYSCA (New York State Council on the Arts) Individual Artist Grant in 2006.

In April, 2010, Sabrina Artel was one of 25 top journalists chosen to participate as a fellows in the sixth National Endowment for the Arts (NEA) Arts Journalism Institute in Theater and Musical Theater at USC Annenberg.

Activist Sabrina Artel was canonized into Fabulous Sainthood in April 2011 by Reverend Billy.
