= Maria Maggenti =

American film director and screenwriter

Maria Maggenti (born c. 1962) is an American film director and screenwriter, who has traditionally created independent films. She was the script editor for the American television series Without a Trace (2003) and has written many episodes for the show as well, but is perhaps best known for the feature film The Incredibly True Adventure of Two Girls in Love (1995). Her film Puccini for Beginners was in competition at the Sundance Film Festival in January 2006. She was also an activist with ACT UP for many years.

== Early life and education ==
Maggenti was raised in Lagos, Nigeria. Her childhood was spent in London, Rome, New York City, and Washington, DC. Maggenti attended Smith College, where she studied Philosophy and Greek and Latin Classics. She then earned her MFA in filmmaking from NYU Graduate School.

== Career ==
She moved to New York City and worked in television commercials and the production of gay rights and AIDS activist documentaries. During this time, she put together letters "asking friends and colleagues to support her enrollment at New York University Film School". Maggenti wanted to create films regarding gay and lesbian life that were more realistic and missing from mainstream movies. She then enrolled in New York University's Graduate Film Program and was awarded a teaching fellowship. During the time between 1990 and 1994, Maggenti worked on various short films. Her 1995 debut film The Incredibly True Adventure of Two Girls in Love helped Maggenti transition into and make a name for herself within the film community. Maggenti originally developed the script for The Incredibly True Adventure of Two Girls in Love as a project for NYU's Graduate Film Program.

=== Films ===
The two movies Maggenti created were low-budget and low-profit. The first movie she ever created was The Incredibly True Adventure of Two Girls in Love (1995), which turned out to be successful even with no budget. Maggenti began thinking about the script with the image of a tomboy, who she later realized was based on her first girlfriend. The film was made with an all-female, unpaid crew. Her movie, Puccini for Beginners (2006), a romantic comedy based on her first big love affair with a man, was filmed in New York City over the span of 18 days, and was released on September 2, 2006. After working on her first few films, Maggenti relocated to Los Angeles, shifting her focus to television writing. In Los Angeles, she wrote for the crime series Without a Trace, which was released in 2002. Maggenti's involvement writing for the Without a Trace was a transition due to the fact that she was working alongside others instead of alone; as she had been doing for ten years. She describes how she, "ultimately came to love it" and "loved her colleagues." While she did enjoy being in the company of "all these smart people," she adds that from a lifestyle point of view, she did not like "the idea that we had to work Monday through Friday every day in an office for 11 straight months." Maggenti also wrote an episode of 90210 and ended up co-producing several other episodes as well. In 2007, she was commissioned by Sundance Film Festival to create a movie for a cell phone. In 2010, Maggenti started to co-write the comedy, Monte Carlo, which was released in 2011.

=== Activism ===
As a core member of ACT UP New York, an activist group working to impact the lives of people with AIDS, Maggenti co-authored some of the group's educational materials, and has been a participant and documentarian of many of the group's direct actions. As a member of the ACT UP Oral History Project she is one of the people preserving the history of ACT UP and the years of the AIDS pandemic, in filmed interviews with the people who have lived through it.

== Personal life ==
Maggenti is bisexual.

== Awards ==
Maggenti received the Best Feature award for her movie Puccini for Beginners at the 2007 Barcelona International Gay & Lesbian Film Festival. Puccini for Beginners was also nominated for the Grand Jury Prize at the 2006 Sundance Film Festival.

== Filmography ==
- Doctors, Liars & Women (1988)
- The Love Monster (1990)
- Waiting for War (1991)
- Name Day (1993)
- La Donna è mobile (1994)
- The Incredibly True Adventure of Two Girls in Love (1995)
- The Love Letter (1999)
- Puccini for Beginners (2006)
- Monte Carlo (2011)
- Before I Fall (2017)

== See also ==
- List of female film and television directors
- List of LGBT-related films directed by women
