= Night Passage (novel) =

1997 novel by Robert B. Parker

- Author: Robert B. Parker
- Language: English
- Series: Jesse Stone
- Genre: Crime novel
- Publisher: Putnam
- Publication date: 1997
- Publication place: United States
- Pages: 322
- ISBN: 978-0-399-14304-5
- Followed by: Trouble in Paradise

Night Passage is a crime novel by Robert B. Parker, the first in his Jesse Stone series.

== Plot summary ==
LA homicide detective Jesse Stone, who already has a penchant for drinking, really begins to hit the bottle after he discovers his wife, actress Jenn Stone, is having an affair with her agent. They divorce and after his drinking leads to his termination from the LAPD he decides to get as far away from his now ex-wife as possible. Despite showing up to the interview intoxicated, he is hired as chief of police for the small town of Paradise, Massachusetts. He later learns that this is because the corrupt Board of Selectmen chair, Hasty Hathaway, is looking for a lush that they can push around. They get more than they bargain for in Stone.

The novel begins with Stone's cross country road trip to Paradise during which the disintegration of his marriage is detailed through flashbacks. Shortly after arriving in Paradise, he meets Jo Jo Genest while responding to a domestic dispute. Genest is a huge body builder, who assists local gangsters in a money laundering operation and also provides muscle for Hathaway. During the confrontation, Stone kicks Genest in the groin. Soon after, Genest proceeds to taunt Stone by vandalizing a police car and killing the station cat as well as writing the word "slut" on both.

Along with being the board of selectmen chair, Hathaway is also a wealthy bank owner and leader of "The Freedom’s Horsemen", a local militia group. It is Hathaway who orchestrates the payoff and termination of the previous police chief, Tom Carson, after Carson learns of the money laundering operation. Carson then moves out west. Hathaway later becomes concerned that Carson will talk and dispatches corrupt police officer Lou Burke to kill Carson. Hathaway also orders Jo Jo Genest to murder Hathaway's mistress, Tammy Portugal, after she demands he leave his wife for her. However, Genest can't help but leave his calling card by writing the word "slut" on Tammy's corpse to further taunt Jesse.

Jesse begins to investigate Tom Carson's murder, and discovers that Lou Burke had traveled out west at the time of the homicide. He responds by suspending Burke while he continues to investigate. Fearing that Jesse is learning too much, Hathaway orders Genest to kill him, but Genest convinces Hathaway to let him kill Burke instead. Hathaway agrees, and Genest throws Burke off a cliff in an attempt to make it look like suicide.

While all these events are taking place, Genest organizes a weapons deal between Hathaway's militia and gay Boston mob boss Gino Fish. When Fish rips off Hathaway, he responds by blaming Genest and demands that he get his money back. Genest retaliates by sending nude Polaroids of Hathaway's wife (and town slut), Cissy, to her priest, town selectmen and others. When the priest calls Chief Stone about the photo, Stone confronts Cissy about it. Cissy admits to having an affair with Genest, among others, and confirms that he took the photos. She also reveals that Genest confessed to murdering Tammy Portugal. Stone then arrests Genest.

Later that evening, Cissy tells her husband what she confessed to Chief Stone and Hathaway panics. He organizes the militia and convinces them to storm the police station, kill Chief Stone and free Genest, whom he intends to kill also. During the standoff, Chief Stone refuses to release Genest and the militia retreat when local and state police arrive. Hathaway is then arrested.

The novel also details Jesse's relationship with local DA, Abby Taylor. They begin a sexual relationship, but she becomes frustrated with him and breaks it off by the end of the novel. His relationship with her and his Scotch consumption are attempts to forget Jenn. However, Jenn does not make this easy as they talk regularly on the phone. Jenn becomes fearful for Jesse's life as the events in Paradise unfold and she realizes she still loves him. The novel ends with Jesse coming home to find Jenn in his apartment.

== Film adaptation ==
The second film in the series starring Tom Selleck differs from the novel in several ways. First, although Hathaway is still a money launderer, he is portrayed as an unwilling accomplice in the other crimes, as opposed to the hard-nosed extremist he is in the novel. Lou Burke and Tom Carson are blended into the single character Lou Carson, and it is Genest who murders him on his own in an attempt to extort more money from Hathaway. Furthermore, instead of throwing Lou off a cliff, Genest uses a van to push Lou's car off the cliff sideways with him in it. It is these car tracks that cause Chief Stone to conclude Lou was murdered and lead him to investigate further. The investigation leads to Hathaway, who organizes a late-night meeting with Stone. During this meeting Hathaway murders Genest by shooting him in the back with former police chief Lou Carson's revolver that Hathaway had stolen earlier. He then plans to murder Stone to make it look like Stone and Genest killed each other. However, Jesse brings backup to stop Hathaway and he arrests him. The backup is Luther "Suitcase" Simpson, who is given the nickname "Suitcase," or "Suit" for short, by Jesse in the film. However, in the novel the nickname is bestowed by his coach in high school. Next, the novel describes Jesse several times drinking Johnnie Walker Black Label scotch, while the film shows the character drinking Red Label. The novel also states several times that there are no black people in Paradise; however, in the film, Molly is portrayed by Academy Award winner Viola Davis, who is black. There is no mention of Tammy Portugal or the Freedom's Horsemen, and Jesse's relationship with Jenn is not detailed as much. In the film their relationship is relegated to short phone calls, and she does not come to Paradise in the end.

Another significant difference in the film is that Jesse was not drunk in his interview. He makes a point several times of clarifying that he had too much to drink the night before, and made the mistake of having one scotch in the morning to steady himself. This is portrayed in the film when he initially arrives in Paradise. However, in the novel the initial interview is in Chicago, well before Stone travels to Paradise. Furthermore, Stone is extremely intoxicated during the interview and this is what draws Hathaway to him. Hathaway figures if he's drunk during the interview he'll be drunk on the job and easy to push around.

The film has a subplot about Jesse having an old dog that he puts down. Jesse does not have a dog in any of the novels. Also, in the novel, the police department already employs a medical examiner. In the film Jesse recruits the local pediatrician for this position, and has him put down his dog because he doesn't like the local vet. Finally, in the novel Jesse lives in a condo on the beach, while in the film Jesse buys an old house on the water.
