= John G. Young (filmmaker) =

American director, producer and writer

John G. Young is an American director, producer and writer. He graduated from the State University of New York at Purchase (SUNY Purchase)where he now teaches and is Chair of The Film Conservatory.

His feature films include Parallel Sons in 1995, The Reception in 2005, Rivers Wash Over Me in 2009, and bwoy in 2016, starring RENT's Anthony Rapp. He also produced Garden in 2004.

John Gilbert Young was also a VP of Production and Editorial Director for Human Relations Media (HRM) for almost two decades, having created over one hundred award-winning programs for the company. He has also supervised a series of shorts entitled Amazing Kids of Character, Profiles in Courage and Portraits of Empathy with Human Relations Media in collaboration with Anson Schloat.

== Filmography ==
Director and writer / screenplay:

- Parallel Sons (1995)
- The Reception (2005)
- Rivers Wash Over Me (2009)
- bwoy (2016)

Director:

- Texting and Driving: The Deadliest Distraction (Documentary Short, 2015)

Editor:

- Parallel Sons (1995)

Producer:

- Garden (1994) (executive producer)

== Awards and nominations ==
- His movie Parallel Sons won the Audience Award for "Best Feature" at the Frameline Film Festival (the San Francisco International Lesbian and Gay Film Festival), Outfest (the Los Angeles LGBTQ Film Festival) and The Florida Film Festival.
- The same movie was nominated for the Grand Jury Prize at Sundance Film Festival.
- Darien Sills Evans with the leading role of Young's movie The Reception won the Grand Jury Award for "Outstanding Actor in a Feature Film" at the Outfest Los Angeles Festival in 2005.
- Derrick L. Middleton with the leading role in Young's movie Rivers Wash Over Me won the Grand Jury Award for "Outstanding Actor in a Feature Film" at the Outfest Los Angeles Festival in 2009. The film also one "Best feature" at the Reeling Film festival in Chicago that year.
