= Death in Paradise (novel) =

2001 novel by Robert B. Parker

- First edition
- Author: Robert B. Parker
- Language: English
- Series: Jesse Stone
- Genre: Crime novel
- Publisher: Putnam
- Publication date: 2001
- Publication place: United States
- Pages: 320
- ISBN: 0-399-14779-9
- Preceded by: Trouble in Paradise
- Followed by: Stone Cold

Death in Paradise is a crime novel by Robert B. Parker, the third in his Jesse Stone series. It was made into a film in 2006.

== Plot summary ==
The third Jesse Stone novel finds Chief Stone investigating the death of a teenage girl after her body washes up on shore. While searching for clues at the crime scene, Stone finds a class ring that ends up belonging to a senior at the high school. Jesse questions him and discovers that he gave his class ring to a fifteen-year-old girl called Eleanor "Billie" Bishop. Chief Stone then questions the school principal, Dr. Lilly Summers, who informs Jesse that Billie was the "town pump."

The case becomes odd when Jesse questions Billie's parents and they deny that she is even their daughter. He confirms that she is indeed their daughter through her two sisters. They also inform Jesse that Billie ran away because her parents did not approve of her behavior, particularly her promiscuity. Jesse later finds that Billie had been staying at a shelter run by a Sister Mary John. Although he finds that Billie is no longer there, the nun gives Jesse the contact number that Billie left. It turns out to be the number of Gino Fish's cover business. Later Sister Mary gives Jesse another number that two separate girls had given her. The number turns out to belong to Gino Fish's associate and probable lover, Alan Garner. Jesse begins following Garner and catches him setting up men with underage prostitutes.

Jesse questions Garner about it, and he agrees to talk under Stone's promise not to make him testify. Garner then admits that he has been pimping underage prostitutes since long before knowing Gino.

Jesse interviews Norman Shaw, a wealthy local citizen and famous author, who drinks heavily throughout. He passes out at the table. Later, Jesse questions one of Shaw's many ex-wives who tells him that she had a private detective follow him while they were married. She had suspected him of infidelities, and the detective confirms this, informing her that he is seeing underage prostitutes almost nightly. Although, she never sees that photos, she uses the information to get a large divorce settlement. Next, Jesse sees her detective who gives him the incriminating photos which depict graphic sexual acts between Shaw and underage girls. Jesse takes the photos to Shaw's current wife who is disgusted and hands over Shaw's gun which Jesse easily confirms as the murder weapon.

With this evidence in hand, Jesse forces Alan Garner to make a statement and then leaves him to be dealt with by Gino. Stone has Suit stake out the hotel that Shaw meets girls at, and when Shaw arrives Stone and Suit break in and catch Shaw in the act with a fifteen-year-old girl. During questioning, Shaw admits to killing Billie after she began threatening to turn him in to the police. When Jesse informs Billie's parents that he has solved the case, that he knows Billie is their daughter, and that it is indeed her body that was found their responses couldn't be more different. The father seems to be overcome and leaves the room, while Billie's domineering mother seems not to care at all.

== Subplots ==
The novel also details a subplot about a woman and her abusive husband. The Snyders are first brought into his office after a domestic dispute in a bar where several witnesses, including Suitcase, witness the man beating his wife. Jesse locks up the husband, and sends the wife to the hospital. She later admits to suffering years of abuse, and asks Jesse to talk to him. Jesse picks him up at work, drives him to the outskirts of town, sticks his gun in his mouth and tells him if he ever lays a hand on his wife again he'll kill him. It works. However, Mrs. Snyder later confides that she always thought if he stopped beating her she would be happy. When he stops beating her and she is still unhappy, she decides to leave him. The events come to a head when Mr. Snyder takes his wife and several of her new co-workers hostage. Jesse goes in to talk to him, where he tells him he is going to kill his wife, then Jesse, then himself. Before he can do it, Jesse shoots and kills Snyder.

Jesse also continues his bizarre relationship with his ex-wife, Jenn. They continue to see each other and other people. Among the other people is Marcy Campbell, first introduced in Trouble in Paradise, and Dr. Lilly Summers, Billie's school principal. Lilly becomes very much infatuated with Jesse; attending his softball games, and later confessing to being in love with him. Finally, at Jenn's bidding Jesse begins seeing a counselor, Dr. Dix, about his drinking. The counseling seems to work, as Jesse has stopped drinking by the end of the novel.

== Film adaptation ==
There are many significant differences in the film. First, Jesse is haunted by dreams of Billie trapped underwater throughout the film, while there is no mention of nightmares in the novel. Furthermore, in the film Jesse's only contact with Jenn is by phone. She does refer him to Dr. Dix, but Jesse insists on discussing cases with him and does not stop drinking. Also since this film was made after the Stone Cold film adaptation, Abby Taylor's murder is referenced. Jesse struggles with guilt over her death and is shown visiting her grave.

The main plot differs significantly. In the film, Shaw is framed for Billie's murder by a man named Leo Finn. Alan Garner is not involved in the plot at all. In the film, Shaw is writing an unflattering exposé on Finn. In an attempt to prevent this, he has his Henchman Lovey Norris murder Billie Bishop. Shaw later tells Jesse that he had fallen in love with Billie, who was pregnant with his child. Jesse confronts Finn and Norris with this information in a warehouse. Norris responds by trying to shoot Jesse, but Jesse shields himself with Finn's body and Norris accidentally kills him. Jesse then draws his weapon and kills Norris. A final significant difference is that Suitcase Simpson is shot in the head during the standoff with Snyder. The film ends with Suitcase in a coma.
