= Stone (surname) =

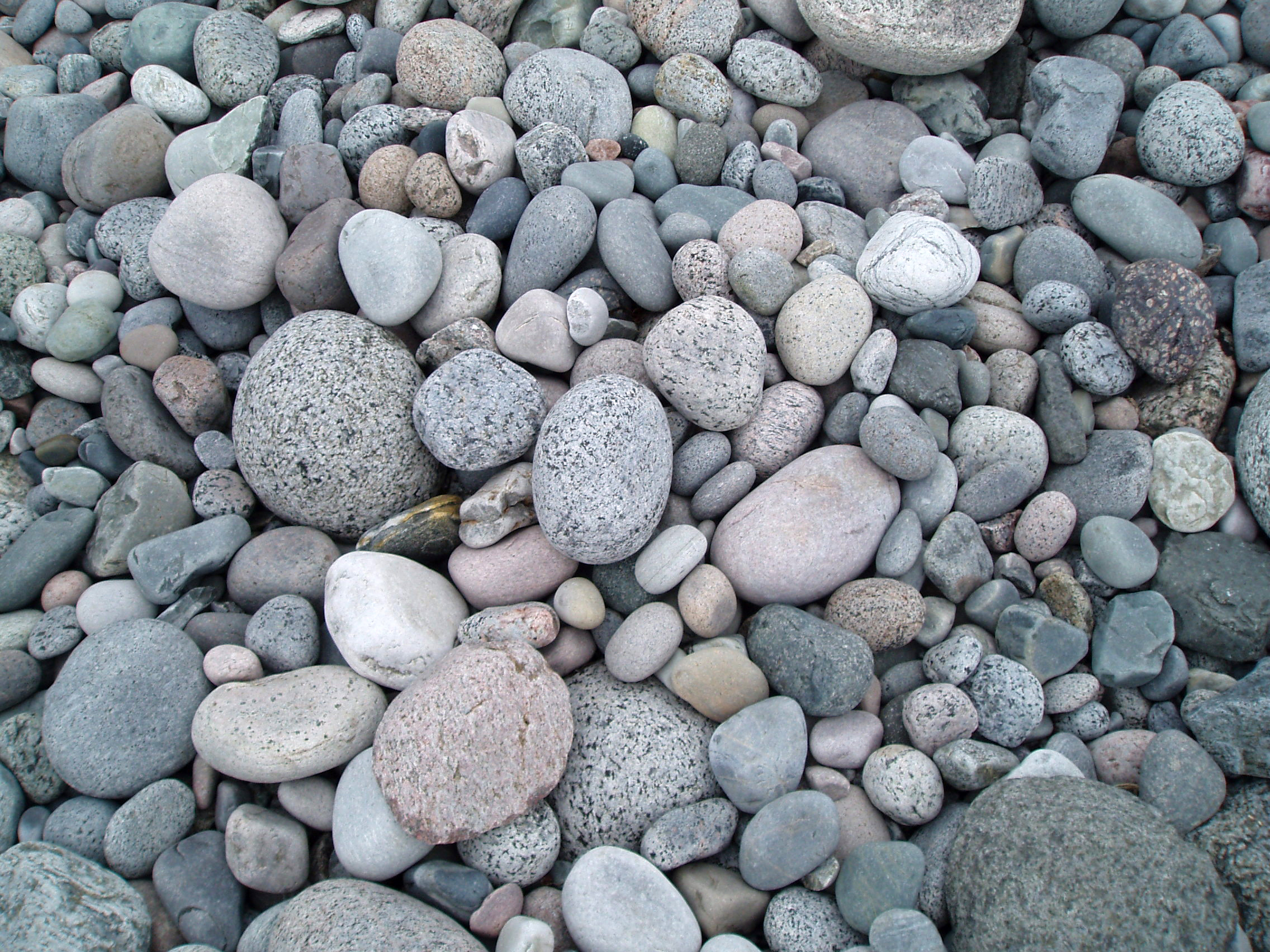
- Stone

Origin
- Region of origin: England

Other names
- Variant forms: Stones, Stein, Stine

Stone is a surname.

== List of people with the surname ==
=== A ===
- Adam Stone, American professor and political scientist
- Alan Stone (disambiguation), several people, including

- Alan A. Stone (1929–2022), American scholar of law and psychology at Harvard, and film critic
- Alan Stone (opera director) (1929–2008), founder of the Chicago Opera Theater
- Alan Stone (wrestler) (born 1977), Mexican professional wrestler

- Albert Stone (born 1928), owner of Sterilite and a philanthropist from Townsend, Massachusetts
- Alfred Stone (disambiguation), several people, including:

- Alfred Stone (musician) (1840–1878), English organist and choir-trainer
- Alfred Stone (1834–1908), American architect from Rhode Island; partner in Stone, Carpenter & Willson
- Alfred Holt Stone (1879–1955), American planter, writer, politician, from Mississippi
- Alfred P. Stone (1813–1865), American politician from Ohio

- Allan Stone (born 1945), Australian tennis player
- Allen Stone (born 1987), American musician
- Amy Wentworth Stone (1876–1938), American children's book author
- Andrew Stone (disambiguation), several people

- Andrew Stone, Baron Stone of Blackheath (born 1942), Labour member of the House of Lords
- Andrew Stone (cricketer) (born 1983), Zimbabwean cricketer
- Andrew Stone (field hockey), represented United States at the 1984 Summer Olympics
- Andrew Stone (footballer) for Indy Eleven
- Andrew Stone (MP) (1703–1773), British MP for Hastings, 1741–1761
- Andrew Stone (Pineapple Dance Studios), dance instructor, cast member of English reality TV series
- Andrew Stone (sailor), participated in Sailing at the 1996 Summer Olympics – Men's 470
- Andrew A. Stone (1885-?), head football coach for the University of Tennessee, 1910
- Andrew C. Stone (born 1956), American computer programmer
- Andrew H. Stone, American judge in the State of Utah
- Andrew L. Stone (1902–1999), American screenwriter, director, and producer
- Andrew Leete Stone (1815–1892), author, Civil War chaplain and pastor

- Angie Stone (1961–2025), American R&B singer
- Anthony Stone (born 1938), British theoretical chemist
- Arthur Stone (disambiguation), several people, including:

- Arthur Stone (priest) (died 1927), Irish-English Anglican priest and Archdeacon of Calcutta
- Arthur J. Stone (1847–1938), American silversmith
- Arthur Burr Stone (1874–1943), American aviation pioneer
- Arthur Stone (actor) (1883–1940), American film actor
- Arthur Thomas Stone (1897–1988), politician in Saskatchewan, Canada
- Arthur Harold Stone (1916–2000), British mathematician
- Arthur Stone (rugby union) (born 1960), New Zealand rugby union player

=== B ===
- Barton Warren Stone (1772–1844), preacher during the Second Great Awakening of the early 19th century
- Bernard Stone (1927–2005), alderman of the 50th Ward in Chicago
- Beverley Stone (1916–2003), Purdue University's first dean of students
- Bill Stone (footballer) (1894–1975), Australian rules footballer for Fitzroy
- Bill Stone (politician) (born 1965), member of the Mississippi State Senate
- Bill Stone (Royal Navy sailor) (1900–2009) British veteran of WWI and WWII
- Billy Stone (American football, born 1925) (1925–2004), running back
- Billy Stone (arena football) (born 1963), American football fullback
- Billy Stone (Australian footballer) (1901–1993), Australian rules footballer for Carlton
- Billy Stone (rugby league), English rugby union and rugby league footballer who played in the 1910s and 1920s
- Biz Stone (Christopher Isaac Stone, born 1974), American entrepreneur who co-founded Twitter
- Brian Stone, American politician

=== C ===
- Carl Stone (born 1953), American composer
- Charles Stone (disambiguation), several people, including

- Sir Charles Stone (mayor) (1850–1931), mayor of Greenwich, England, 1915–1920
- Charles Stone III (born 1966), American film director, son of Chuck Stone
- Charles B. Stone III (1904–1992), United States Air Force general
- Charles D. Stone (1920–1992), Pennsylvania politician
- Charles Edwin Stone (1889–1952), English recipient of the Victoria Cross
- Charles Joel Stone (1936–2019), American statistician and mathematician
- Charles Stone (English cricketer) (1865–1951), English cricketer
- Charles Stone (New Zealand cricketer) (1866–1903), New Zealand cricketer
- Charles Stone (priest) (died 1799), Anglican priest in Ireland
- Charles P. Stone (1915–2012), American major general and commander of the 4th Infantry Division in the Vietnam War
- Charles Pomeroy Stone (1824–1887), Union general during the American Civil War
- Charles Warren Stone (1843–1912), United States Representative from and Lieutenant Governor of Pennsylvania
- Charlie Stone (rugby league) (1950–2018), English rugby league player

- Cheryl Stone, South African-born co-founder of Bangarra Dance Theatre, an Indigenous dance company in Australia
- Chic Stone (1923–2000), comic book artist
- Chris Stone (Animation Director), Animation director of Dead Space (video game) and other games
- Chris Stone (entrepreneur), co-founder of the Record Plant recording studios
- Chris Stone (footballer) (1959–2023), Australian rules footballer
- Chris Stone (sprinter) (born 1995), British sprint athlete and runner-up at the 2019 British Indoor Athletics Championships
- Christopher Stone (disambiguation), several people, including

- Christopher Stone (MP) (1556–1614), English politician
- Christopher Stone (actor) (1942–1995), American actor
- Christopher Stone (broadcaster) (1882–1965), first disc jockey in the United Kingdom
- Christopher Stone (cricketer) (born 1951), English cricketer
- Christopher Stone (criminal justice expert), American criminal justice expert
- Christopher Stone, Research Director, Centre for Policy Development, Australia
- Christopher Stone, contestant in series 4 of Britain's Got Talent
- C.J. Stone (Christopher James Stone, born 1953), author, journalist and freelance writer
- Chuck Stone (1924–2014), journalist and Tuskegee airman

- Clara Stone Fields Collins (1908–1981), Alabama legislator
- Cliffie Stone (1917–1998), American country singer, musician, record producer, music publisher, and radio and TV personality
- Clyde E. Stone (1876–1948), American jurist
- Cornelia Branch Stone (1840–1925), president-general, United Daughters of the Confederacy; president, Texas Woman's Press Association
- Curt Stone (1922–2021), American long-distance runner

=== D ===
- Daren Stone (born 1985), National Football League defensive back for Atlanta Falcons
- Dave Stone (born 1964), British author of several Dr. Who and Judge Dredd spin-off novels
- David Stone (disambiguation), several people, including

- David B. Stone (1927–2010), American businessman
- David E. Stone (born 1947), American sound editor
- David Henry Stone (1812–1890), Lord Mayor of London in 1874
- David John Anthony Stone (born 1947), British Army officer and military historian
- David Lee Stone (born 1978), British fantasy author
- David R. Stone (born 1968), American military historian
- David Scott Stone, musician
- David Stone (cyclist) (born 1981), British cyclist
- David Stone (footballer) (born 1942), English footballer
- David Stone (keyboardist) (born 1953), keyboardist
- David Stone (magician) (born 1972), French magician
- David Stone (politician) (1770–1818), American politician, Governor of North Carolina and U.S. Senator
- David Stone (producer) (born 1966), American theatre and musical producer

- Dean Stone (1929–2018), Major League Baseball pitcher
- Devin James Stone, American lawyer and YouTuber
- Don Stone (publisher), DJ, publisher and businessman
- Donnie Stone, American football player
- Donna J. Stone (1933–1994), American poet and philanthropist
- Doug Stone (born 1956), American country singer
- Doug Stone (voice actor) (born 1950), Canadian voice actor
- Douglas Stone (disambiguation), several people, including

- Douglas M. Stone, United States Marine Corps general officer
- Douglas Maxwell Stone (born 1948), Australian geologist and author
- Doug Stone (born 1956), American country music singer
- Doug Stone (voice actor) (born 1950), American actor

=== E ===
- Edmund Stone (c. 1700 – c. 1768), Scottish mathematician
- Edward Stone (disambiguation), several people, including

- Edward Stone (natural philosopher) (1702–1768), English cleric and discoverer of active ingredient in aspirin
- Edward James Stone (1831–1897), British astronomer, president of the Royal Astronomical Society 1882–1884
- Edward Albert Stone (1844–1920), Australian judge, chief justice in Western Australia
- Edward Giles Stone (1873–1947), Australian engineer working with reinforced concrete and manufacturing cement
- Edward Durell Stone (1902–1978), American modernist architect
- Edward C. Stone or Ed Stone (1936-2024), American astronomer

- Edward Daniel Stone (1832–1916), deacon, classical scholar and schoolmaster at Eton College

- Edward Durell Stone Jr. (1932–2009), American landscape architect

- Eliphalet Stone (disambiguation), several people
- Elizabeth Stone (disambiguation), several people
- Elmer Fowler Stone (1887–1936), aviator and commander in the US Coast Guard
- Emma Stone (born 1988), American actress and singer
- Eugenia Stone (1872–1934), Australian journalist, later Lady Doughty
- Ezra Stone (1917–1994), American actor

=== F ===
- Francis Gordon Albert Stone (1925–2011), British chemist
- Frank Stone (painter) (1800–1859), English painter
- Frank Stone (Wisconsin politician) (1876–1937), American politician
- Fred Stone (1873–1959), American theater and film actor
- Fred Stone (musician) (1935–1986), Canadian musician
- Freddie Stone (born 1946), Sly & the Family Stone singer/guitarist
- Frederick Stone (1820–1899), American politician from Maryland

=== G ===
- Galen L. Stone (1862–1926), American financier and philanthropist
- Gavin Stone (born 1998), American baseball player
- Gavin Stone (rower) (born 1997), Canadian rower
- Gene Stone (born 1951), American writer and editor
- Gene Stone (baseball) (1944–2009), American baseball player
- George Stone (disambiguation), several people including

- George Stone (basketball) (1946–1993), American basketball player
- George Stone (bishop) (1708–1764), Irish archbishop and sermon writer
- George Stone (composer) (born 1965), American composer and educator
- George Stone (outfielder) (1876–1945), American Major League Baseball batting champion
- George Stone (pitcher) (born 1946), American baseball pitcher
- George Stone (politician) (1907–2001), British socialist journalist
- George Albert Stone III (born 1994), American rapper known professionally as EST Gee
- George Cameron Stone (1858–1935), American arms collector and author
- George E. Stone (1903–1967), Polish-born American actor
- George Frederick Stone (1812–1875), Western Australia Attorney General and census writer
- George Lawrence Stone (1886–1967), American drummer and author
- Georgie Stone (1909–2010), American silent film child actor in Rio Grande (1920 film)
- Georgie Stone (born 2000), Australian actress and transgender rights advocate

- Geno Stone (born 1999), American football player
- Gordon Stone (1925–2011), British chemist
- Gordon Stone (rugby union) (Charles Gordon Stone, 1914–2015), Australian rugby union player
- Grace Zaring Stone (1891–1991), American author

=== H ===
- Hal Stone (died 2007), American actor
- Harlan Fiske Stone (1872–1946), Chief Justice of the United States
- Henry Stone (disambiguation), several people, including

- Henry Stone born Henry David Epstein (1921–2014), American record company executive
- Henry Stone (comedian) (born 1988), Australian comedian, writer, and actor
- Henry Stone (painter) (1616–1653), English painter
- Henry Stone, 1887 mayor of Shire of Hinchinbrook

- Herbert L. Stone (1871–1955), American magazine editor, publisher and sailor
- Homer A. Stone (1868–1938), American politician
- Horace M. Stone (1890–1944), New York politician

=== I ===
- I. F. Stone (Isidor Feinstein Stone, 1907–1989), American journalist
- Isabelle Stone, (1868–1944), American physicist
- Irving Stone (1903–1989), American author
- Irwin Stone (1907–1984) biochemist
- Ivan Brude Stone (1907–1985), American businessman and politician

=== J ===
- J. F. S. Stone (John Frederick Smerdon Stone, c. 1891–1957), British archaeologist
- J. N. Stone (1882–1926), college football and basketball coach
- J. Riley Stone (1886–1978), Wisconsin State Assemblyman
- James Stone (disambiguation), several people including

- James Stone, ring name of James Maritato, American wrestler
- James Stone (academic administrator), first president of Kalamazoo College, involved in the founding of the United States Republican Party
- James Stone (American football) (born 1992), American football player
- James Stone (executive) (born 1947), American business executive
- Jamie Stone (politician) (born 1954), Scottish politician
- James L. Stone (1922–2012), United States Army officer and Medal of Honor recipient
- James M. Stone, politician in the Massachusetts House of Representatives
- James Riley Stone (1908–2005), Canadian military commander of the Princess Patricia's Canadian Light Infantry during the Battle of Kapyong
- James W. Stone (1813–1854), United States Representative from Kentucky
- Jamie Magnus Stone (born 1985), Scottish film director and animator

- Jeff Stone (disambiguation), several people including

- Jeff Stone (author) (active since 2003), American author of Kung Fu themed books for children
- Jeff Stone (baseball) (born 1960), American former baseball outfielder
- Jeff Stone (California politician) (born 1956), American politician in California State Senate since 2014
- Jeff Stone (Wisconsin politician) (born 1961), American politician in Wisconsin State Assembly
- B. Jeff Stone (1936–2011), American rockabilly and country singer
- Jeffrey Stone (1926–2012), American actor and voice-over artist

- Jennifer Stone (born 1993), American actress
- Jeremy Stone (1935–2017), scientist and activist
- Jesse Stone (disambiguation), several people

- Jesse Stone (Georgia politician), state senator from Georgia (U.S. state)
- Jesse Stone (Wisconsin politician) (1836–1902), Lieutenant Governor of Wisconsin from 1899 to 1903

- Jimmy Stone (1876–1942), English cricketer
- Joanna Stone (born 1972), Australian javelin thrower
- John Stone (disambiguation), several people including

- John Stone (actor) (1924–2007), Welsh actor
- John Stone (American football) (born 1979), American football player
- John Stone (Australian politician) (1929–2025), Australian Senator and Treasury Secretary
- John Stone (baseball) (1905–1955), American baseball outfielder
- John Stone (footballer) (born 1953), English footballer
- John Stone (martyr) (died c. 1539), English martyr
- John Stone (Parliamentarian) (before 1632 – after 1659), English politician
- John Stone (MP for Wallingford) (before 1679 – after 1685), English politician
- John Stone (producer) (1888–1961), American film producer and screenwriter
- John Stone (1765) (1765–1834), American church deacon
- John A. Stone (died 1864), American collector and publisher of folk songs
- John Augustus Stone (1801–1834), American dramatist and playwright
- Sir John Benjamin Stone (1838–1914), British Member of Parliament
- John G. Stone (1876–1934), Newfoundland politician
- John Hoskins Stone (1750–1804), American politician
- John Hurford Stone (1763–1818), British radical political reformer and publisher
- John Marshall Stone (1830–1900), American politician and Governor of Mississippi, 1876–1882 and 1890–1896
- John N. Stone (1882–1926), American football coach at Clemson University in 1908
- John Stone Stone (1869–1943), American mathematician, physicist and inventor
- John Timothy Stone (1868–1954), American Presbyterian clergyman
- John W. Stone (1838–1922), American politician and jurist from Michigan
- John Stone (comics), character in DC Comics Planetary series

- Jon Stone (1931–1997), children's television writer
- Jordan Stone (born 1984), American soccer player
- Joseph Stone (disambiguation), several people including

- Joseph Stone, Baron Stone (1903–1986), Officer in the British Army, doctor, and royal peer
- Joseph Champlin Stone (1829–1902), U.S. Representative from Iowa
- Joseph Stone (screenwriter), screenwriter, see Academy Award for Best Writing (Original Screenplay)

- Joshua David Stone (died 2005), author and meditation teacher
- J. Stone & Co founded by Josiah Stone, British engineer
- Joss Stone (born 1987), British soul singer
- Julian Stone (born 1962), British actor
- Julius Stone (1907–1985), professor of law

=== K ===
- Kate Stone (1841–1907), diarist

=== L ===
- Leonard Stone (1923–2011), television and film actor
- Lewis Stone, (1879–1953), American actor
- Lucinda Hinsdale Stone (1814–1900), American feminist, educator, traveler, writer, philanthropist
- Lucy Stone (1818–1893), women's rights activist

=== M ===
- Marjorie McKenney Stone (born 1923), American military machinist
- Mark Stone (disambiguation), multiple people
- Marshall Harvey Stone (1903–1989), American mathematician
- Martin Stone (disambiguation), several people, including

- Martin Stone (actor), actor in British TV serial The Chronicles of Narnia
- Martin Stone (guitarist) (1946–2016), guitarist and rare book dealer
- Martin Stone, co-founder of the Carlin Motorsport team
- Martin Stone (wrestler), British wrestler

- Mary-Katherine Stone, American politician
- Matt Stone (born 1971), comedian, a co-creator of the TV series South Park
- Merlin Stone, sculptor, author, academic
- Michael Stone (disambiguation), several people including

- Michael Stone (American football) (born 1978), safety for the Houston Texans
- Michael Stone (Australian Army officer), Australian Army officer
- Michael Stone (author) (born 1966), English author
- Michael Stone (criminal) (born 1960), English convicted murderer
- Michael Stone (cyclist) (born 1991), American cyclist
- Michael Stone (Hustle), a character from the UK television series Hustle
- Michael Stone (ice hockey) (born 1990), Canadian ice hockey player
- Michael Stone (loyalist) (born 1955), loyalist paramilitary from Northern Ireland
- Michael H. Stone (1933–2023), American psychiatrist
- Michael Stone, the nom de guerre of the American and later Israeli military officer Mickey Marcus, David "Mickey" Marcus
- Michael Jenifer Stone (1747–1812), U.S. politician
- Michael P. W. Stone (1925–1995), Secretary of the U.S. Army
- Michael E. Stone (born 1938), scholar of Armenian studies

- Mike Stone (disambiguation), several people including

- Mike Stone (baseball) (born 1955), American college baseball coach
- Mike Stone (defence) (born 1953), Chief Information Officer of the British Ministry of Defence
- Mike Stone (ice hockey) (born 1972), retired American professional ice hockey centre
- Mike Stone (karate) (born 1944), American martial arts competitor and actor
- Mike Stone (lacrosse) (born 1986), current player for the Boston Cannons
- Mike Stone (musician) (born 1969), guitarist for the progressive metal band Queensrÿche
- Mike Stone (radio personality) (born 1958), sports radio broadcaster in Detroit, Michigan
- Mike C. Stone (born 1970), American businessman and politician from North Carolina
- Mike Stone (record producer) (1951–2002), English recording engineer and record producer
- Mike D. Stone (1949–2017), American recording engineer
- Mike Stone, founder of independent record label Clay Records, Stoke-on-Trent
- Mike Stone (character), lead character of The Streets of San Francisco

- Milburn Stone (1904–1980), actor

=== N ===
- Nicholas Stone (1586/87–1647), English sculptor and architect
- Nick Stone (disambiguation), multiple persons

=== O ===
- Oliver Stone (born 1946), American motion picture scriptwriter and director

=== P ===
- Patrick Thomas Stone (1889–1963) United States federal judge
- Perry Stone (disc jockey), American disc jockey
- Pete Stone, footballer in the 1956 Summer Olympics
- Peter Stone (disambiguation), several people

- Peter Stone (footballer) (born 1954), Australian footballer
- Pete Stone, Australian footballer in the 1956 Summer Olympics
- Peter Stone (professor) (born 1971), professor in computer science at the University of Texas at Austin
- Peter G. Stone (born 1957), British archaeologist

- Philip Stone (1924–2003), English film actor
- Preston Stone (born 2001), American football player

=== R ===
- Richard Stone (disambiguation), multiple people
- Rick Stone, rugby league football coach
- Ricky Stone (born 1975), baseball pitcher
- Rob Stone (actor) (born 1962), American actor and director
- Rob Stone (entrepreneur) (born 1968), New York-based executive
- Rob Stone (rapper) (born 1995), American rapper
- Rob Stone (sportscaster), American football and soccer commentator
- Robert Stone (disambiguation), multiple people
- Roger Stone (born 1952) American political consultant, author, lobbyist and strategist
- Rose Stone (born 1945), Sly & the Family Stone singer/keyboardist
- Sir Roy Stone (1961–2025), British civil servant
- Royal A. Stone (1875–1942), American jurist
- Ruby Stone (1924–2013), American politician
- Ruth Stone (1915–2011), American poet
- Ryan Stone (born 1985), ice hockey player

=== S ===
- Sandy Stone (artist) (born 1936), American author and artist
- Sean Stone (born 1984), film director, producer, cinematographer, screenwriter, and actor.
- Shane Stone, Chief Minister of the Northern Territory (1995–1999)
- Sharman Stone (1951–2026), member of the Australian House of Representatives
- Sharon Stone (born 1958), U.S. actress
- Sly Stone (1943–2025), Sly & the Family Stone singer-songwriter, frontman
- Spencer Stone (born 1992), American United States Air Force staff sergeant
- Steve Stone (disambiguation), several people including

- Steve Stone (baseball) (born 1947), American baseball player and broadcaster
- Steve Stone (footballer) (born 1971), former English footballer
- Steve Stone (ice hockey) (born 1952), retired Canadian ice hockey player
- Steve Stone (rugby league) (born 1969), Australian rugby league player

- Stu Stone, film, television, and voice actor

=== T ===
- Tanya Lee Stone (born 1965), American author
- Ted G. Stone (1934–2006), Southern Baptist evangelist
- Thomas Stone (1743–1787), a signer of the US Declaration of Independence as a delegate from Maryland
- Thomas Treadwell Stone (1801–1895), American Unitarian pastor and abolitionist
- Tobias Stone (died 2012), American bridge player
- Todd Stone, Canadian politician
- Tom Stone (disambiguation), several people including

- Tom Stone (soccer), American head coach of the women's soccer team at Texas Tech University
- Tom Stone (photographer) (born 1971), American documentary photographer
- Tom Stone (magician) (born 1967), otherwise known as Thomas Bengtsson, Swedish magician, editor and author
- Thomas Treadwell Stone (1801–1895), American Unitarian pastor, Abolitionist, and Transcendentalist
- Tom Stone (wrestler), American wrestler

- Tony Stone (disambiguation), several people including

- Tony Stone (filmmaker), American independent filmmaker
- Tony Stone (music producer) (born 1982), American music producer and project developer for Christian hip hop artists
- Tony Stone (Edinburgh), Scottish entrepreneur and founder of porridge maker Stoats Porridge Bars

- Tuffy Stone, American competitive barbecue chef
- Tyler Stone (born 1991), American basketball player in the Israeli Basketball Premier League

=== U ===
- Ulysses S. Stone (1878–1962), American politician from Oklahoma

=== V ===
- Vet Stone (born 1949), Sly & the Family Stone singer
- Vicki Stone (born 1949), American folk artist

=== W ===
- Walter Stone (disambiguation), several people including

- Walter F. Stone (1822–1874), Republican politician and judge in Ohio
- Walter Napleton Stone (1891–1917), English recipient of the Victoria Cross
- Walter Stone (screenwriter) (1920–1999), chief writer for The Honeymooners
- Walter W. Stone (1910–1981), Australian book publisher and book collector
- W. W. Stone (1840-1930), American politician

- Warren Stanford Stone (1860–1925), railway engineer, headed Brotherhood of Locomotive Engineers from 1903 to 1925.
- William Stone (disambiguation), several people including

- W. Clement Stone (1902-2002), American businessman, philanthropist and New Thought self-help book author
- William Stone (attorney) (1842–1897), Freedmen's Bureau agent, Attorney General of South Carolina
- William Stone (baritone) (born 1944), operatic baritone
- William Stone (caver) (born 1952), expeditionary caver
- William Stone (MP for Salisbury), Member of Parliament (MP) for Salisbury (UK Parliament constituency)
- William Stone (Maryland governor) (1603–1660), governor of the colony of Maryland
- William Stone (Tennessee politician) (1791–1853), U.S. Representative from Tennessee
- William A. Stone (1846–1920), governor of Pennsylvania
- William C. Stone, Chairman and CEO of SS&C Technologies
- William Carlos Stone (1859–1939), philatelist
- William Duncan Stone, Hong Kong judge, see Silver Bauhinia Star
- William F. Stone (1909–1973), Virginia lawyer and legislator
- William Frank Stone, Canadian ambassador to Afghanistan
- William Henry Stone (1828–1901), U.S. representative from Missouri
- William Henry Stone (MP) (1834–1896), British politician, MP for Portsmouth, 1865–1874
- William Henry Stone (physician) (1830–1891), English physician, Fellow of the Royal College of Physicians
- William Johnson Stone (1841–1923), US Representative from Kentucky
- William J. Stone (1848–1918), governor of Missouri
- William M. Stone (1827–1893), governor of Iowa
- William H. Stone (politician), California politician
- William Leete Stone (disambiguation), multiple people
- William Murray Stone (1779–1838), American Episcopal bishop of Maryland
- William Oliver Stone (1830–1875), American portrait painter
- William S. Stone (1910–1968), U.S. Air Force general and U.S. Air Force Academy superintendent

- Wilson Stone (disambiguation), several people:

- Wilson Stone (scientist) (1907–1968), American geneticist and zoologist
- Wilson Stone (politician), US politician from Kentucky

- Witmer Stone (1866–1939), American ornithologist, botanist, and mammalogist

== Fictional characters ==
- Stone, fictional character in the G.I. Joe universe
- Agent Stone, the secondary antagonist of the Sonic the Hedgehog film series
- Benjamin Stone in the TV series Law & Order
- Candace Stone, a character in the TV series You
- Charlie Stone, a character in the TV series Veronica Mars
- Judge Harold T. Stone in the TV series Night Court
- Henry Stone, fictional character in The Fugitive
- Dr. Jeremy Stone, character in the film The Andromeda Strain
- Jesse Stone, policeman in Jesse Stone novels by Robert B. Parker, also a film series featuring Tom Selleck in the title role
- Michael Stone (Hustle) played by Adrian Lester on the BBC drama series Hustle
- Lt. Mike Stone played by Karl Malden in The Streets of San Francisco
- Nick Stone, fictional hero of several books by Andy McNab
- Patsy Stone, character in the comedy series Absolutely Fabulous
- Peter Stone, a character in the drama series Degrassi: The Next Generation
- Ramona A. Stone, character in the 1995 Outside (David Bowie album)
- Sam Stone, fictional U.S. veteran of the Vietnam War in the John Prine song of the same name
- Sandy Stone (character) played by Barry Humphries
- Silas Stone, DC Comics character
- Steven Stone, a character in the Pokémon franchise
- Tom Stone, character in Tom Stone, a 2002–2003 Canadian TV series known in the U.S. as Stone Undercover
- Victor Stone, better known by his alias, Cyborg, one of DC's Teen Titans

=== Families ===
- Stone family in the 2000 fantasy film Thomas and the Magic Railroad
  - Burnett Stone, played by Peter Fonda
  - Lily Stone, played by Mara Wilson
- Stone family in the 2005 comedy The Family Stone
  - Kelly Stone, played by Craig T. Nelson
  - Sybil Stone, played by Diane Keaton
  - Everett Stone, played by Dermot Mulroney
  - Ben Stone, played by Luke Wilson
  - Amy Stone, played by Rachel McAdams
  - Thad Stone, played by Tyrone Giordano
  - Susannah Stone Trousdale, by Elizabeth Reaser
- Stone family in the 2013 comedy series Zach Stone Is Gonna Be Famous
  - Zach Stone, played by Bo Burnham
  - Sydney Stone, played by Kari Coleman
  - Drew Stone, played by Tom Wilson
  - Andy Stone, played by Cameron Palatas
- Stone family in the 2018 drama series Manifest
  - Michaela Stone, played by Melissa Roxburgh
  - Ben Stone, played by Josh Dallas
  - Grace Stone, played by Athena Karkanis
  - Olive Stone, played by Luna Blaise
  - Cal Stone, played by Jack Messina and Ty Doran
  - Steve Stone, played by Malachy Cleary
  - Karen Stone, played by Geraldine Leer

== See also ==
- Stones (surname)
- Stone (disambiguation)
