= William Stone =

William, Billy or Bill Stone may refer to:

== Politicians ==
- William Stone (MP for Salisbury), member of parliament (MP) for Salisbury
- William Stone (Maryland governor) (1603–1660), governor of the colony of Maryland
- William Stone (Tennessee politician) (1791–1853), U.S. representative from Tennessee
- William H. Stone (politician), California politician
- William M. Stone (1827–1893), governor of Iowa
- William Henry Stone (1828–1901), U.S. representative from Missouri
- William Henry Stone (physician) (1830–1891), English physician, Fellow of the Royal College of Physicians
- William Henry Stone (MP) (1834–1896), British politician, MP for Portsmouth (1865–1874)
- William Johnson Stone (1841–1923), U.S. representative from Kentucky
- William A. Stone (1846–1920), governor of Pennsylvania
- William J. Stone (1848–1918), governor of Missouri, U.S. representative and senator
- William F. Stone (1909–1973), Virginia lawyer and legislator
- William Frank Stone (active 1977-1978), Canadian ambassador to Afghanistan
- Bill Stone (politician) (born 1965), member of the Mississippi State Senate

== Sports ==
- Billy Stone (rugby), English rugby union and rugby league footballer of the 1910s and 1920s
- Bill Stone (footballer) (1894–1975), Australian rules footballer for Fitzroy
- Billy Stone (Australian footballer) (1901–1993), Australian rules footballer for Carlton
- Billy Stone (American football, born 1925) (1925–2004), American football running back
- Billy Stone (American football, born 1963), former American football fullback
- Tige Stone (William Arthur Stone, 1901–1960), American baseball outfielder and pitcher

== Military ==
- Bill Stone (Royal Navy sailor) (1900–2009), one of the last surviving British veterans of the First World War
- William S. Stone (1910–1968), U.S. Air Force general and U.S. Air Force Academy superintendent

== Others ==
- William Stone (mercer) (died 1607), London cloth merchant
- William Murray Stone (1779–1838), American Episcopal bishop of Maryland
- William Leete Stone Sr. (1792–1844), American journalist, publisher and public official in New York City
- William Oliver Stone (1830–1875), American portrait painter
- William Leete Stone Jr. (1835–1908), American historical writer and journalist
- William Stone (attorney) (1842–1897), American Freedmen's Bureau agent, Attorney General of South Carolina
- William Carlos Stone (1859–1939), American engineer and philatelist
- W. Clement Stone (1902–2002), American businessman, philanthropist and self-help book author
- William Duncan Stone, Hong Kong judge, see Silver Bauhinia Star (received in 2011)
- Bill Stone (nephrologist) (1936–2020), American nephrologist
- William Stone (baritone) (born 1944), American operatic baritone
- William Stone (caver) (born 1952), American engineer, expeditionary caver and explorer
- William C. Stone (born 1955), American businessman (chairman and CEO of SS&C Technologies)

== See also ==
- Will Stone (born 1980/81), British politician
- William Stones (1904–1969), British politician
