= Alfred Stone =

Alfred Stone may refer to:

- Alfred Stone (musician) (1840–1878), English organist and choir-trainer
- Alfred Stone (architect) (1834–1908), American architect from Rhode Island; partner in Stone, Carpenter & Willson
- Alfred Holt Stone (1879–1955), American planter, writer, politician, from Mississippi
- Alfred P. Stone (1813–1865), American politician from Ohio

== See also ==
- Alan Stone (disambiguation)
- Albert Stone (born 1916), owner of Sterilite and a philanthropist from Townsend, Massachusetts
- Stone (surname)
- Stones (surname)
