= Underbelly (events promoter) =

British live events producer

Underbelly Limited
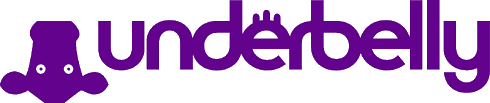
- Type: Private company
- Industry: Arts
- Founded: 2000
- Headquarters: London, England
- Products: Theatre and comedy promotion, productions and Venues
- Subsidiaries: Underbelly Promotions Limited
- Website: http://www.underbelly.co.uk

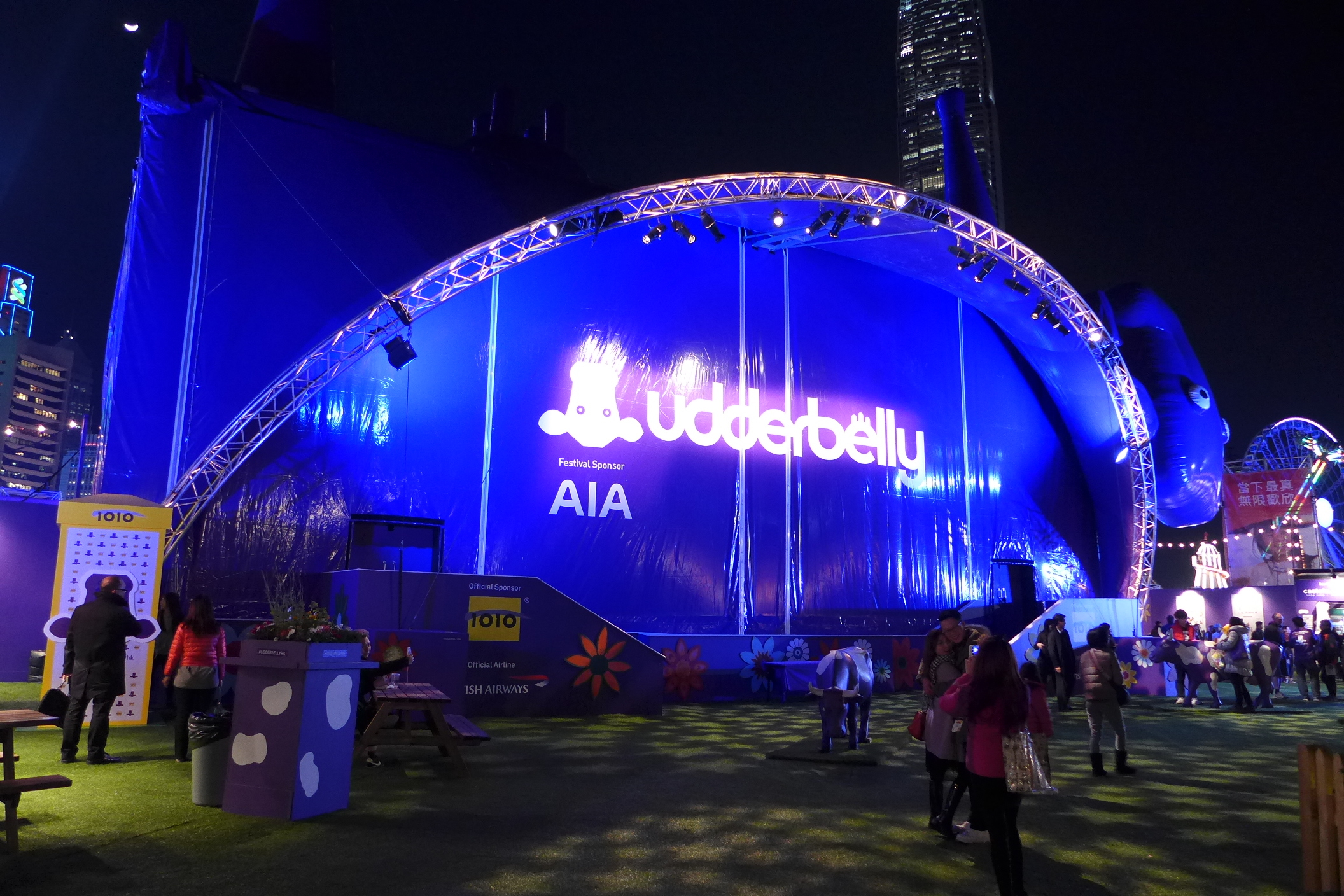
Uddberbelly Festival in Hong Kong during December 2015

Underbelly (trading as Underbelly Limited) is a live events producer and venue operator, known as one of the "Big Four" venue operators at the Edinburgh Festival Fringe. From its roots as a Fringe venue, the company has expanded to include a festival on London's South Bank and seasonal events in Edinburgh and elsewhere.

== History ==
Underbelly was founded in 2000 by directors Ed Bartlam and Charlie Wood to operate one venue at the Edinburgh Festival Fringe. In 2001, Underbelly Limited was formed to turn the Underbelly venue into a professional operation. Over the years, Underbelly's operations have expanded beyond the Cowgate, to include a hub space known as the Udderbelly pasture in George Square and a Circus Hub on The Meadows, as well as a hub in Bristo Square. Each Underbelly venue is recognisable by its purple, cow-themed branding, most notably a large, upside-down, inflatable purple cow which serves as one of the venues. In 2015, Underbelly hosted over 130 shows at the Fringe.

For many years, Underbelly also co-ordinated "Edinburgh's Christmas" - a funfair, market and events programme in the eastern section of Princes Street Gardens, but stopped in 2022.

=== Other locations ===
In 2009, in collaboration with the Southbank Centre in London, the company launched Udderbelly Festival, an eight-week programme of comedy, circus and family entertainment inside the upside-down purple cow venue. By 2015, the festival had extended to fifteen weeks. The festival won Best Festival at the London Lifestyle Awards in 2012.

In 2012, Underbelly also launched London Wonderground, a programme of circus, cabaret and family entertainment, based in a 1920s Paradiso Spiegeltent. The Wonderground also presents oddities, curiosities and eccentricities such as the 60-metre high Star Flyer which gives views over London's rooftops.

Other London events which Underbelly has produced include West End Live in Trafalgar Square, Pride in London (2014–18), and the Rekorderlig Cider Lodge at Southbank Centre's Winter Festival. In 2015, Underbelly produced the official Fanzone at the Rugby World Cup in Richmond.

Elsewhere, the company produced the Comedy Hullabaloo in Stratford-Upon-Avon (2013–15) and the Udderbelly Festival in Hong Kong.

== Underbelly Cowgate ==
Underbelly
- The front entrance to Underbelly on Cowgate
- Interactive map of Underbelly
- Address: Cowgate, Edinburgh. (entrance also on Victoria Street); Edinburgh; Scotland
- Coordinates: 55°56′54″N 3°11′33″W
- Owner: Edinburgh City Council

Construction
- Opened: 2000 (annually during the Edinburgh Fringe only)

Website
- www.underbelly.co.uk

The floor plan for Underbelly.

The Underbelly is a venue at the Edinburgh Festival Fringe off Cowgate. From 2001 to 2004, Underbelly was the only venue operated by the promoter.

Underbelly was first opened in 2000, as a small performance venue for five shows brought to the Fringe by Double Edge Drama. The Double Edge directors had heard of the venue through a production of Gargantua, performed by the Scottish company, Grid Iron in the vaults below the central library of Edinburgh. The site was discovered by Judith Doherty and named 'Underbelly' by Judith and Ben Harrison. Grid Iron staged a show there. The location's and Double Edge's shows won a Fringe First for its critically acclaimed productions of Bent and Marat Sade.

The venue now includes a number of different performance spaces, with themed names such as Iron Belly, White Belly and Big Belly. The Belly Laugh (originally the Belly Bar) was also used for late night cabaret as well as the venue's second bar. Space downstairs which is now used for Belly Dance was used to exhibit a film installation by Nick Hornby.

In 2002, The Underbelly was renamed The Smirnoff Underbelly. The number of performance spaces was increased to include the Belly Button and Belly Laugh comedy venues and a third bar, the Jelly Belly, to the first floor. The number of shows increased from 18 to over 50. In 2003, the Belly Dancer was soundproofed to ensure that it can be used throughout the day without disrupting other performances. This allowed Underbelly to team up with Forth One 97.3 to host a series of free live music gigs every night in the Belly Dancer, known as the Forth One Fringe. These gigs have included Mark Owen, Ocean Colour Scene and Skin and Keane In 2004, the Delhi Belly space was added. The bars were rearranged to create more space and ease congestion and queuing. Finally, a brand new large box office was created in one of the rooms off the front alley, which freed up the old box office to become a larger and more usable publicity office with a sofa and coffee. The shows at the Underbelly venue won a record number of awards, including the Perrier Award for Jackson's Way; Fringe First Awards for The Ignatius Trail, Manchester Girl and The Jammer; Perrier Newcomer Nomination for Joanna Neary in Joanna Neary is Not Feeling Herself; and an Amnesty Award nomination for Someone Who'll Watch Over Me.

== Criticisms ==
=== 2019 Christmas Market ===
In December 2019, Underbelly came under scrutiny for acquiring the East Princes Street Gardens without planning permission. The markets were marked by safety concerns that were kept secret by the City of Edinburgh Council and for the subsequent damage done to the gardens from their operations, that also included criticism over handling of memorial benches moved to make way for the market. An investigation into the £150,000 damage to the gardens caused by the market has been launched.

In response, Edinburgh council agreed to consider moving the markets, and launched an internal investigation into whether correct processes were followed in granting a two-year contract extension to the operator.

Further criticism has arisen after the longstanding tradition of the Loony Dook, held annually on the morning of January 1 every year, became a ticketed event which quickly sold out. Underbelly has been criticised for profiteering from a public tradition, as well as raising the price of tickets for profit.

=== 2019 Hogmanay ===
Underbelly, in collaboration with Edinburgh city council, came under criticism in 2019 for restrictions on residents during Edinburgh's Hogmanay celebration. The company restricted access to residents and limited the number of guests they could invite by providing a limited number of "residents' passes" per household. The company was also accused of passing on resident's details to police for 'security checks'. The claims were disputed by councillors, who stated the arrangements were "just the same as they have been in previous years".

Labour party Member of the Scottish Parliament for Lothian, Sarah Boyack, said that it "should not be up to a private company to decide how many people they can have in their homes" and warned that it impacted private family events.

=== Labour conditions ===
During the 2017, 2018 and 2019 Edinburgh festival, and the 2017, 2018 and 2019 Hogmanay celebrations, Underbelly have been criticised for exploitation and mistreatment of its staff, with accusations of underpayment and non-payment, poor accommodation for its staff, and poor management. In the 2018 Fringe Festival, Underbelly were criticised for unfair labour practices in the course of the Fair Fringe campaign to ensure the companies paid the minimum wage, observed legal limits on working hours and did not use unpaid volunteers.

== See also ==
- Edinburgh Fringe
- Edinburgh Festival
