= Christopher Stone =

Christopher or Chris Stone may refer to:

- Christopher Stone (MP) (1556–1614), English politician
- Christopher Stone (actor) (1942–1995), American actor
- Christopher Stone (broadcaster) (1882–1965), first disc jockey in the United Kingdom
- Christopher Stone (cricketer) (born 1951), former English cricketer
- Christopher Stone (professor), American criminal justice expert
- Christopher Stone, contestant in series 4 of Britain's Got Talent
- Chris Stone (footballer) (1959–2023), Australian rules footballer
- Chris Stone (entrepreneur), co-founder of the Record Plant recording studios
- C.J. Stone (Christopher James Stone, born 1953), author, journalist and freelance writer
- Biz Stone (Christopher Isaac Stone, born 1974), American entrepreneur who co-founded Twitter
- Chris Stone (sprinter) (born 1995), British sprint athlete and runner-up at the 2019 British Indoor Athletics Championships
- Christopher D. Stone, legal scholar and proponent of environmental personhood
- Christopher L. Stone, American television and film composer, son of American screenwriter, film director and producer Andrew L. Stone
