= David Stone =

David Stone may refer to the following people:

- David B. Stone (1927–2010), American businessman
- David E. Stone (born 1947), American sound editor
- David Henry Stone (1812–1890), Lord Mayor of London in 1874
- David John Anthony Stone (born 1947), British Army officer and military historian
- David Lamme Stone Jr. (1876–1959), American Army officer
- David Lee Stone (born 1978), British fantasy author
- David R. Stone (born 1968), American military historian
- David Scott Stone, musician
- David Stone (American football) (born 2005), American football player
- David Stone (cyclist) (born 1981), British cyclist
- David Stone (footballer) (born 1942), English footballer
- David Stone (keyboardist) (born 1953), keyboardist
- David Stone (magician) (born 1972), French magician
- David Stone (politician) (1770–1818), American politician, Governor of North Carolina and U.S. Senator
- David Stone (producer) (born 1966), American theatre and musical producer

== See also ==
- Dave Stone, British television writer
