= Tom Stone =

Tom or Thomas Stone may refer to:

- Tom Stone (soccer), head coach of the women's soccer team at Texas Tech University
- Tom Stone (photographer) (born 1971), American documentary photographer
- Tom Stone (magician) (born 1967), otherwise known as Thomas Bengtsson, Swedish magician, editor and author
- Tom Stone (TV series), a 2002–2003 Canadian TV series, known in the U.S. as Stone Undercover
- Tom Stone (wrestler), American wrestler
- Thomas Stone (1743–1787), one of the signers of the U.S. Declaration of Independence
  - USS Thomas Stone, a President Jackson-class attack transport
  - SS Thomas Stone, a Liberty ship
- Thomas E. Stone (1869–1959), American civil servant
- Thomas Treadwell Stone (1801–1895), American Unitarian pastor, abolitionist, and Transcendentalist
- T. Clarence Stone (1899–1969), American businessman and politician
