= CJ Stone =

CJ Stone may refer to:

- C.J. Stone (writer)
- Bass Bumpers, DJ and record production team, known for their dance/techno music.
