= Peter Stone =

Peter Stone may refer to:

- Pete Stone, Australian footballer in the 1956 Summer Olympics
- Peter G. Stone (born 1957), British archaeologist
- Peter Stone (cricketer) (born 1938), New Zealand cricketer
- Peter Stone (professor) (born 1971), professor in computer science at the University of Texas at Austin
- Peter Stone (soccer, born 1954) (1954–2022), Australian footballer
- Peter Stone (writer) (1930–2003), American writer
- Peter Stone (rugby union), Welsh international rugby union player

== Characters ==
- Peter Stone (Chicago Justice and Law & Order: Special Victims Unit), a fictional character in Dick Wolf's Chicago and Law & Order franchises
- Peter Stone (Degrassi character), fictional character on the television series Degrassi: The Next Generation
