= Robert Hugh Layton =

British anthropologist

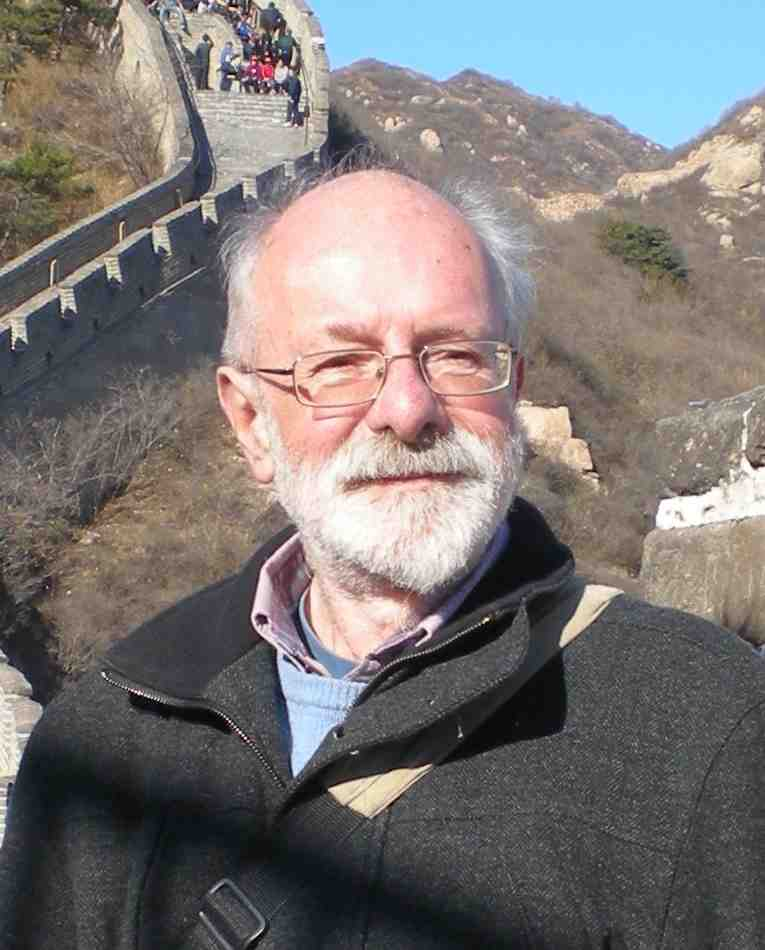
- Born: 1 December 1944 (age 80)
- Occupation: Anthropologist
- Known for: Anthropology of Art, Anthropology of Conflict, Social Evolution

Robert H. Layton (born 1944) is a British anthropologist and Fellow of the British Academy. He is Emeritus Professor of Anthropology at Durham University. He has carried out fieldwork in rural France and in a number of Aboriginal communities in Australia, and recently on traditional craft in rural China. Robert Layton studied anthropology at University College London under the famous Australian anthropologist Phyllis Kaberry. He completed his DPhil under the supervision of F.G. Bailey at the University of Sussex. He is known for his eclectic approach to anthropology and diverse range of interests. He has written extensively about art, archaeology, the evolution of hunter-gatherer society and culture, the co-evolution of genes and culture, social change and anthropological theory. He was the recipient of the Royal Anthropological Institute's Rivers Memorial Medal for a substantive contribution to anthropology in 2003

== Social change in rural France ==
Robert Layton's doctoral research was conducted in Franche-Comté, France. His research on social change in rural France culminated in the publication, in 2001, of an ethnohistorical account of social change in rural France, in which he explores the limits of social theory in explaining social process, and assesses alternative approaches drawn from evolutionary theory. In that book he uses social changes that have occurred in rural France since the Enlightenment to explore broader social changes that have occurred across Europe, notably the land enclosures of England.

== Anthropology of Art ==
Robert Layton's 1991 book, The Anthropology of Art (Cambridge University Press), seeks to place the study of art within an anthropological framework. He rejects the use of the word primitive when discussing art because he argues that this implies that the origins and early development of art is then evident in art in modern cultures. In his later theoretical work Robert Layton has also critically reflected on a theoretical approach outlined by Alfred Gell in Art and Agency. In particular, Layton focuses on Gell's definition of art as defined by the distinctive function it performs in advancing social relationships through 'the abduction of agency'. He focuses on Gell's employment of Charles Sanders Peirce's term 'index', and notes that Peirce's approach deflects attention from signification towards the link between art works and the things to which they refer. In doing so, he considers what Peirce meant by abduction, and concludes that while Gell made a good case for the agency of art objects he does not explain the distinctive ways in which art objects extend their maker's or user's agency.

While studying Australian rock art Robert Layton helped prepare a number of Aboriginal Land Claims, of which the first was the claim to the Uluru National Park. This research has been published in his books Uluru: An Aboriginal history of Ayers Rock (Aboriginal Studies Press, Canberra, 1986 reissued 2001) and Australian rock art, a new synthesis (Cambridge University Press 1992). He has revisited Australia several times, working on the Hodgson Downs land claim in 1993-4 and helping to prepare the Australian Government's submission to UNESCO to place the Uluru National Park on the World Heritage List as a cultural landscape of universal value. He was the senior author of the Australian Government's successful renomination of the Uluru-Katatjuta National Park to the World Heritage List as an indigenous landscape of Universal Significance. This was only the second indigenous landscape to be inscribed on the World Heritage List.

His work on Australian Aboriginal Rock Art highlights the contrast between Western art and Aboriginal art. While individual expression of personal experiences and emotions is an important part of the former artistic tradition, it is not central, or indeed important, in traditional Aboriginal rock art.

== Archaeology ==
Robert Layton has promoted dialogue between Western archaeologists and indigenous communities through the World Archaeological Congress.

== Civil Society, Social Disorder and War ==
Layton's 2006 book, Order and Anarchy: Civil Society, Social Disorder and War (CUP), examines the role of violence in human evolution. Layton argues that social systems come from interaction between agents using cultural strategies. Social disorder and war result when such cultural strategies are undermined by changes in economic and social landscapes such as those brought about by globalisation.

== Works ==
- "Anthropology and history in Franche-Comté: A critique of social theory" (2000). Oxford University Press
- "The anthropology of art" (1981, 1991 2nd edition). Cambridge University Press
- "Australian rock art: A new synthesis" (1992). Cambridge University Press
- "An introduction to theory in anthropology" (1997). Cambridge University Press
- "Order and anarchy: Civil society, social disorder and war" (2006). Cambridge University Press
- "Uluru: An aboriginal history of Ayers Rock" (1986). Australian Institute of Aboriginal Studies

== Editorial works ==
- "The archaeology and anthropology of landscape: Shaping your landscape" (1999) edited by Peter J. Ucko and Robert Layton. Routledge
- "Conflict in the archaeology of living traditions" (1994). Routledge
- "The destruction and conservation of cultural property" (2001) edited by Robert Layton, Peter G. Stone and Julian Thomas. Routledge
- "A future for archaeology: The past in the present" (2006) edited by Robert Layton, Stephen Shennan and Peter Stone. Left Coast Press
- "Hunter-gatherers: An interdisciplinary perspective" (2001) edited by Catherine Panter-Brick, Robert Layton and Peter Rowley-Conwy. Cambridge University Press
- "Who needs the past? Indigenous values and archaeology (1994) edited by Robert Layton. Routledge
