= George Stone =

George Stone may refer to:

== Sportsmen ==
- George Stone (outfielder) (1876–1945), American MLB batting champion
- George Stone (footballer) (1894–1940), English winger
- George Stone (basketball) (1946–1993), American small forward
- George Stone (pitcher) (born 1946), American MLB pitcher

== Writers ==
- George Stone (bishop) (1708–1764), Irish archbishop and sermon writer
- George W. Stone (1811–1894), American legal author, Chief Justice of Alabama Supreme Court
- George Frederick Stone (1812–1875), Western Australia Attorney General and census writer
- George Cameron Stone (1858–1935), American arms collector and author
- George Lawrence Stone (1886–1967), American drummer and author
- George Stone (politician) (1907–2001), British socialist journalist
- George Stone (composer) (born 1965), American educator and writer
- George Stone (science fiction writer), co-creator, Max Headroom

== Others ==
- George E. Stone (1903–1967), Polish-born American actor
- George A. Stone, American Union Army general
- George Albert Stone III (born 1994), American rapper better known as EST Gee

== See also ==
- Georgie Stone (born 2000), Australian actress and transgender rights advocate
- Georgie Stone (1909–2010), American silent film child actor in Rio Grande (1920 film)
- George Stoney (disambiguation)
