= Jeff Stone =

Jeff Stone may refer to:

- Jeff Stone (author) (active since 2003), American author of Kung Fu themed books for children
- Jeff Stone (baseball) (born 1960), American former baseball outfielder
- Jeff Stone (California and Nevada politician) (born 1956), American politician in the California State Senate (2014–2019) and Nevada State Senate (2023–present)
- Jeff Stone (Wisconsin politician) (born 1961), American politician in Wisconsin State Assembly
- B. Jeff Stone (1936–2011), American rockabilly and country singer
- Jeffrey Stone (1926–2012), American actor and voice-over artist

== See also ==
- Jefferson Pier or Jefferson Stone, marking the second prime meridian of the United States
- Jeff Stone, a character in the American television series The Donna Reed Show (1958–1966), played by Paul Petersen
