= Martin Stone =

Martin Stone may refer to:

- Danny Burch, English wrestler currently uses ring name Martin Stone
- Martin Stone (actor), actor in British TV serial The Chronicles of Narnia
- Martin Stone (philosopher), philosopher and former professor
- Martin Stone (guitarist) (1946–2016), guitarist and rare book dealer
- Martin Stone, co-founder of the Carlin Motorsport team
- The Balluderon Stone, a Pictish cross slab in Angus, Scotland, also known as Martin's Stone
