= Tony Stone =

Tony Stone may refer to:

- Tony Stone (filmmaker), American independent filmmaker
- Tony Stone (music producer) (born 1982), American music producer and project developer for Christian hip hop artists
- Tony Stone (Edinburgh), Scottish businessman and founder of porridge maker Stoats Porridge Bars
- Anthony Stone (born 1938), emeritus professor of chemistry at the University of Cambridge

== See also ==
- Toni Stone (1921–1996), American baseball player
