= Arthur Stone =

Arthur Stone may refer to:

- Arthur Stone (priest) (1852–1927), Irish-English Anglican priest and Archdeacon of Calcutta
- Arthur J. Stone (1847–1938), American silversmith
- Arthur Burr Stone (1874–1943), American aviation pioneer
- Arthur Stone (actor) (1883–1940), American film actor
- Arthur Thomas Stone (1897–1988), politician in Saskatchewan, Canada
- Arthur Harold Stone (1916–2000), British mathematician
- Arthur Stone (rugby union) (born 1960), New Zealand rugby union player
- The Arthur stone, or Artognou stone, an archaeological find in Cornwall, UK

== See also ==
- Arthur's Stone, Herefordshire, a Neolithic chambered tomb
- Stone Arthur, a fell in the English Lake District
