= Allan Adler =

American silversmith

Allen Adler
- Born: Allen Adler; 8 May 1916; New York
- Occupation: silversmith
- Known for: "silversmith to the stars"

Allan W. Adler (May 8, 1916 – December 3, 2002) was an American silversmith, known as "silversmith to the stars".

== Career ==
He started his career when he was introduced to a man named Porter Blanchard by his uncle. Beginning his career as an apprentice in 1938, Adler designed silverware and holloware in shapes inspired by the Modernist art movement of the early 1900s.

Adler shaped his designs according to the emerging art of the early 1900s His name became associated with Hollywood glamour in the early 1940s, and he was commissioned to design mini-Oscars for Academy Award winners, crowns for Miss Universe and Miss USA, and silver bowls, candlesticks and goblets for celebrity clients. During John F. Kennedy's presidential campaign, Adler crafted a silver coffee urn to be used at a fund-raising event. As a businessman, Adler opened his own shop on Sunset Boulevard in Los Angeles and later in La Jolla, Corona del Mar and San Francisco. In 1980 fire burnt almost his $1 million

== Personal life ==
Adler married Becca Blanchard, daughter of noted silversmith Porter Blanchard. His wife was killed in a car accident.
