= Edward Stone =

Edward or Ed Stone may refer to:

- Edward Stone (natural philosopher) (1702–1768), English cleric and discoverer of active ingredient in aspirin
- Edward Stone (slave trader) (1782–1826), American interstate slave trader, based in Kentucky
- Edward Albert Stone (1844–1920), Australian judge, chief justice in Western Australia
- Edward C. Stone or Ed Stone (1936–2024), American astrophysicist and the head of the Voyager program for 50 years
- Edward Daniel Stone (1832–1916), deacon, classical scholar and schoolmaster at Eton College
- Edward Durell Stone (1902–1978), American modernist architect
- Edward Durell Stone Jr. (1932–2009), American landscape architect
- Edward Giles Stone (1873–1947), Australian engineer working with reinforced concrete and manufacturing cement
- Edward James Stone (1831–1897), British astronomer, president of the Royal Astronomical Society 1882–1884
- Ed Stone (baseball) (1909–1983), American Negro league baseball player
- Ed Stone, lead character of the British sitcom Ed Stone Is Dead

== See also ==
- Edwardstone, a village in Suffolk, England
- EdStone, a large stone tablet commissioned by the British Labour Party during the 2015 general election
- Edstone, a village and civil parish in North Yorkshire, England
