= Nick Stone =

Nick Stone may refer to:

- Nick Stone (author), British thriller writer
- Nick Stone (footballer, born 1981), Australian rules footballer, played with Hawthorn & St Kilda between 2002 and 2005
- Nick Stone (footballer, born 1972), Australian rules footballer, played with West Coast between 1997 and 2000

== See also ==
- Nicholas Stone (1586/87–1647), English sculptor and architect
