= George Stoney =

George Stoney may refer to:

- George Johnstone Stoney (1826–1911), Irish physicist, introduced the term electron
- George M. Stoney (1852–1905), American Navy officer and Arctic explorer
- George C. Stoney (1916–2012), director, New York University professor of communications, and the father of public-access television
