= Douglas Stone =

Douglas or Doug Stone may refer to:

- Douglas M. Stone, United States Marine Corps general officer
- Douglas Maxwell Stone (born 1948), Australian geologist and author
- A. Douglas Stone, professor of physics
- Doug Stone (born 1956), American country music singer
  - Doug Stone (album), 1990
- Doug Stone (voice actor) (born 1950), American actor
