= Balluderon Stone =

Coordinates: 56.5261°N 3.0179°W

The Balluderon Stone Martin's Stone
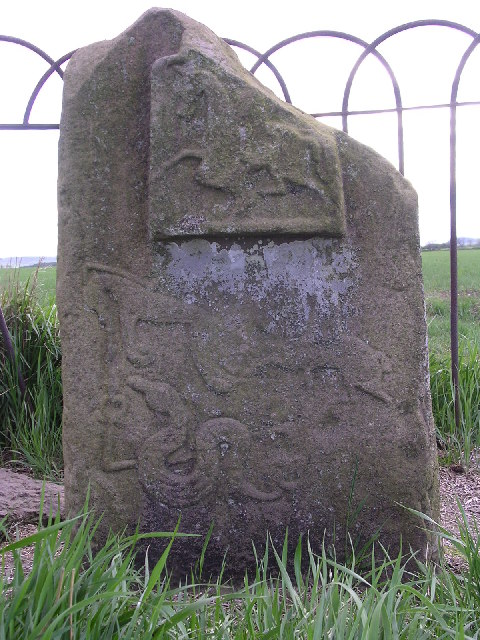
- The Balluderon Stone
- Material: Old Red Sandstone
- Size: 2 metres (6.6 ft)
- Symbols: Celtic cross (fragmentary); Mounted figures Serpent and z-rod Pictish beast
- Present location: Balluderon, Angus
- Classification: Class II cross slab

The Balluderon Stone, otherwise known as Martin's Stone is a class II Pictish cross slab in situ at Balluderon, Angus, Scotland.

== Description ==
A slab of Old Red Sandstone, the cross slab is situated in a field and protected by iron fencing. The slab, of which only the lower half remains, bears the remnants of a Celtic cross, two mounted riders, a serpent and z-rod symbol and a Pictish beast design. Local tradition associates the slab with the Legend of the Nine Maidens who were devoured by a dragon which was subsequently slain by a hero named Martin. Folk etymology names this as the origin of Strathmartine, the valley in which the slab stands.
