= Eliphalet Stone =

Eliphalet Stone could mean

- Eliphalet Stone (Massachusetts), state representative from Massachusetts
- Eliphalet Stone (Wisconsin shipmaster), state representative from Wisconsin
