= William Leete Stone =

William Leete Stone may refer to either of two American authors and historians:

- William Leete Stone, Sr. (1792-1844)
- William Leete Stone, Jr. (1835-1908)
