= Sterilite =

American manufacturer of plastic storage containers

Coordinates: 42°39′43.6″N 71°41′50.9″W

- Type: Private
- Founded: 1939; 87 years ago in Fitchburg, Massachusetts
- Founder: Saul Stone, Edward Stone, Earl Tupper
- Products: Preparation, storage, serving products for the kitchen and home, and beauty products
- Website: sterilite.com

Sterilite Corporation is an American manufacturer of plastic storage containers. The company was founded by Saul and Edward Stone and Earl Tupper in 1939.

== History ==
Sterilite was founded in 1939 in Fitchburg, Massachusetts as a partnership between Saul and Edward Stone and Earl Tupper, the inventor of Tupperware. The company gained initial business by selling plastic goods to the Armed Forces during World War II. The company later expanded operations to produce toys, storage tools, giftware, and other plastic items.

The company relocated to nearby Townsend, Massachusetts in 1968. By the mid-1970s, it was one of the largest independent manufacturers of private household plastic goods in the United States. The company has since opened manufacturing plants in Birmingham, Alabama, Lake Havasu City, Arizona, Massillon, Ohio, Clinton, South Carolina, Ennis, Texas, and Davenport, Iowa.

In 2009, Sterilite donated a new public library and senior center to Townsend, the largest gift in the town's history.
