= Peter Stone (rugby union) =

Welsh rugby player (1924–1971)

- Born: 20 June 1924 Loughor, Wales
- Died: 10 July 1971 (aged 47) Bideford, Devon, England

Rugby union career
- Position: Wing-forward
International career
Years	Team	Apps	(Points)
1949	Wales	1	(0)

Peter Stone (20 June 1924 — 10 July 1971) was a Welsh international rugby union player.

Born in Loughor, Stone played for Aberystwyth RFC, Llanelly RFC and University College of Wales.

Stone gained his solitary Wales cap deputing an injured Ray Cale at wing-forward for the final fixture of the 1949 Five Nations, a loss to France at Colombes which decided the "wooden spoon".

A teacher, Stone tutored rugby to future Wales player Max Wiltshire at Rhydir Lower Comprehensive School.

== See also ==
- List of Wales national rugby union players
