= Loony Dook =

Annual event in Edinburgh, Scotland

Coordinates: 55°59′34″N 3°23′12″W

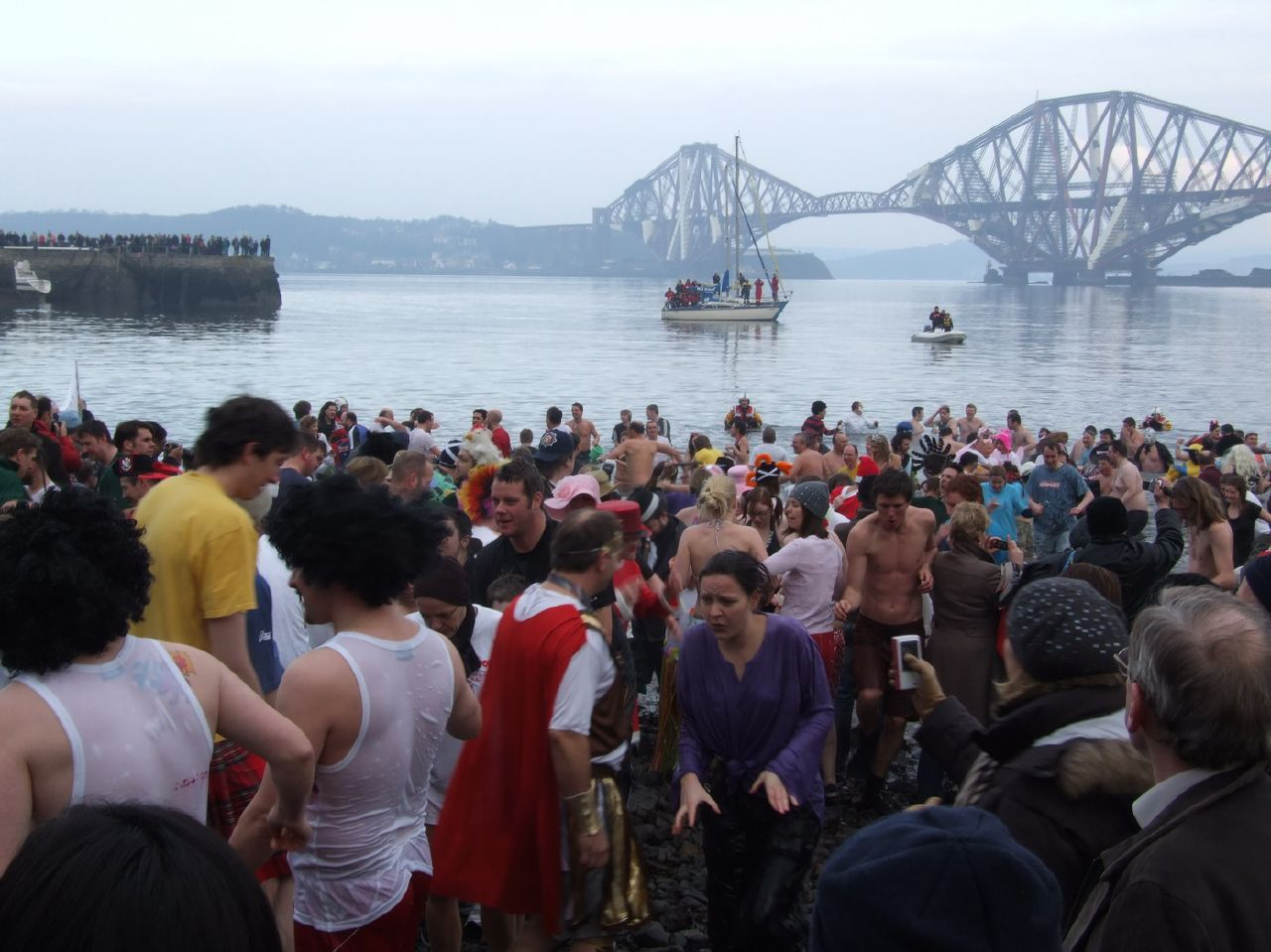
The 2009 Loony Dook

The Loony Dook is an annual event held on New Year's Day in which people dive into the freezing waters of the Firth of Forth at South Queensferry (north of Edinburgh, Scotland), often in fancy dress.

== Course of events ==
On New Year's Day, typically in the morning (but times vary according to tides), Many dookers first take part in the Dookers' Fancy Dress Parade, leading from the Hawes car park to the old mole. Spectators cheer on the participants at various vantage points.

The Dookers are then greeted by bagpipe pipers and warmed with bowls of "energising porridge", prior to plunging themselves into the freezing Firth of Forth.

== History ==
The event was conceived in 1986 as a joking suggestion by three locals for a New Year's Day hangover cure. The following year, it was decided to repeat the event for charity.

After a few years of only local significance, the event gradually grew in the 1990s, both in popularity and number of participants. The growth accelerated after the event began to be mentioned in the official Edinburgh Hogmanay publicity material and got a boost when the Millennium edition was broadcast live by the BBC.

Originally organised by locals and starting from the Moorings pub (now the Inchcolm), factors such as increased crowds, safety issues and popularity necessitated a different handling. As a consequence, the events from 2009 onwards were professionally handled by event managers Unique Events. Being the organisers of the Edinburgh Hogmanay Festival, they included the Loony Dook into the latter from 2011. In the same year a registration fee was introduced to cover the cost of organisation and stewarding. The fee of originally £6 was raised to £10 in 2016. This went up to £12 in 2020, attracting criticism from the event's founders, who described it as a "damned disgrace". In 2021 and 2022 the event did not take place, due to Covid, and in 2023 and 2024 the event reverted to local control, with no entry fee but a voluntary charity donation.

The proceeds benefit RNLI Queensferry and local charities.

The Loony Dook received sponsorship from the tour company Haggis Adventures (from 2011) and then from the porridge company Stoats.

Up to 2016, three of the original Dookers, James MacKenzie, Iain 'Rambo' Armstrong and Kenny Ross, have the distinction of taking part in every Loony Dook and the trio wore specially designed T-shirts with '30 yrs' to celebrate the achievement.

== Other Loony Dooks ==
The event has inspired similar annual New Year's day Loony Dooks, such as in North Berwick and Dunbar in East Lothian, Portobello in Edinburgh, St Andrews, Dalgety Bay and Kirkcaldy in Fife and Coldingham Sands in Berwickshire all of which are on the south east coast of Scotland.

== See also ==
- Edinburgh's Hogmanay
- South Queensferry
- Forth Bridge
