= Walter Stone =

Walter Stone may refer to:

- Walter Napleton Stone (1891–1917), English recipient of the Victoria Cross
- Walter F. Stone (1822–1874), Republican politician and judge in Ohio
- Walter W. Stone (1910–1981), Australian book publisher and book collector
- W. W. Stone (1840–1930), American politician in Mississippi
- Walter Stone (screenwriter) (born 1920), chief writer for the Honeymooners
- Walter King Stone (1875–1949), American artist and illustrator
- Walter Stone (runner) (born 1913), American steeplechase runner, 3rd at the 1937 USA Outdoor Track and Field Championships
