= Porter Blanchard =

American silversmith

- Born: February 28, 1886; Gardner, Massachusetts, US
- Died: November 1, 1973 (aged 87); Burbank, California, US
- Movement: Arts and Crafts
- Awards: Medalist, Boston Society of Arts and Crafts

Porter George Blanchard (February 28, 1886 – November 1, 1973) was an American silversmith living and working in Pacoima, California. He is considered to have been part of the Arts and Crafts Movement.

== Career ==
Blanchard learned the trade of the silversmith from his father, George Porter Blanchard in Gardner, Massachusetts. In 1923, Blanchard moved to Burbank, California, where he established a studio for silversmithing. Between the 1930s and 1950, he operated a shop in Hollywood. He then worked from his home in Pacoima from the 1940s until his death in 1973.

His daughter Alice Blanchard married Lewis Wise, who conducted business as Porter Blanchard Silversmiths in Calabasas, California. After 1955, all Porter Blanchard flatware was made at the Calabasas shop, while the holloware was made at Blanchard's Pacoima home. His daughter Rebecca married Allan Adler, who continued designing as a silversmith in the Arts and Crafts tradition.

Blanchard was a member of the Boston Society of Arts and Crafts and was awarded their title of medalist in 1944.

== Legacy ==
Many of his papers, including photographs of his shop, are collected in the Archives of American Art at the Smithsonian Institution in Washington, D.C. They were donated to the Archives by his daughters, Rebecca Adler and Alice E. Wise.

Blanchard's works are in the collections of various museums, including the Cooper-Hewitt National Design Museum, the Los Angeles County Museum of Art, and the Oakland Museum of California.
