= Albert Stone =

American businessman (1928–2023)

- Born: March 25, 1928; Haverhill, Massachusetts, U.S.
- Died: December 12, 2023 (aged 95); Groton, Massachusetts, U.S.
- Military career
- Allegiance: United States of America
- Branch: United States Navy
- Service years: 1950s
- Conflicts: Korean War

Albert Stone (March 25, 1928 – December 12, 2023) was an American businessman and philanthropist from Townsend, Massachusetts who was the owner of Sterilite.

== Early life ==
Albert Stone was raised in Haverhill, Massachusetts. He attended Colby College and then served in the navy during the Korean War. During that time, he was stationed in Okinawa. After his service in the military, he attended Harvard Business School. After his graduation, he joined Sterilite, the company that his uncle and father founded in 1939.

== Later life ==
After moving the company from Fitchburg, Massachusetts to Townsend, Massachusetts in 1968, he settled down in neighboring town Groton. Later on in life, he became a philanthropist locally. Over the years, he has donated money for a food bank, playground, and defibrillators to the town. His most recent donation has been estimated at 20 million dollars, when he donated money for the construction of the town library and senior center. This donation came along with a clause that stated that the library should not be named after him or the company, but for a former selectman and his wife, consistent with his rather quiet demeanor and attention-shy personality.

In 1969, Stone became a member of the Board of Trustees of Applewild School, an independent co-ed day school located in Fitchburg, Massachusetts. Mr. Stone held the position of president of the board from 1973 to 1982. In 2007, Applewild School presented its Founder's Award to Mr. Stone.

Stone died at his home in Groton, Massachusetts on December 12, 2023, at the age of 95.
