= Edinburgh's Hogmanay =

Observance of Hogmanay

Edinburgh’s Hogmanay
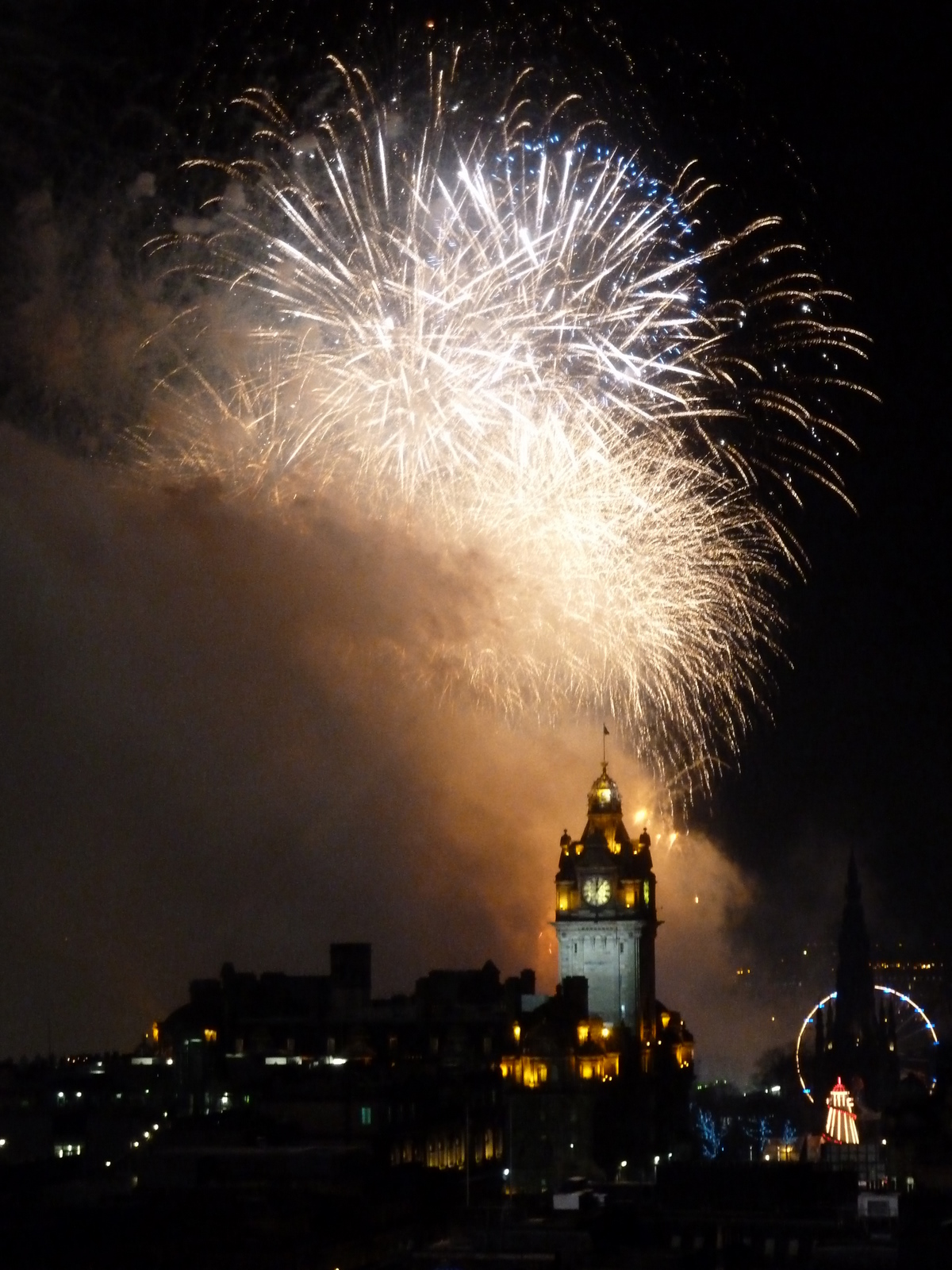
- 2010–11 fireworks display over Edinburgh Castle
- Genre: New Year's Eve event
- Begins: 29 December
- Ends: 1 January
- Frequency: Annually
- Locations: Princes Street, Edinburgh, Scotland
- Years active: 1993–present
- Inaugurated: 1993
- Most recent: 2025–26 (2025)
- Previous event: 2023–24 (2023)
- Next event: 2026–27 (2026)
- Attendance: 50,000 (2023–24)
- Budget: £812,456
- Organiser: Unique Assembly

Edinburgh's Hogmanay is the celebration and observance of Hogmanay—the Scottish celebration of the New Year—held in the capital city of Scotland, Edinburgh. The fireworks display at Edinburgh Castle are broadcast on television in Scotland, such as BBC Scotland's Hogmanay, as well as Hogmanay celebration broadcasts by STV.

== History ==
The annual Hogmanay celebration was originally an informal street party focused on the Tron Kirk in the High Street of the Old Town. Since 1993, it has been officially organised with the focus moved to Princes Street. In 1996, over 300,000 people attended, leading to ticketing of the main street party in later years up to a limit of 100,000 tickets.

In 2003–2004, most of the organised events were cancelled at short notice due to very high winds. Similarly, the 2006–2007 celebrations in Edinburgh were cancelled on the day, again due to high winds and heavy rain.

Due to the COVID-19 pandemic in Scotland, all organised events were cancelled in June 2020. On 21 December 2021, the events were once again cancelled, after the Scottish government announced limitations on gatherings to control the spread of SARS-CoV-2 Omicron variant. Outdoor festivities were once again cancelled in 2024 due to forecasts of wind and rain.

== Hogmanay celebrations ==
=== Edinburgh celebrations ===
Hogmanay is the Scots word for New Year's Eve. In Scotland, New Year's Eve is celebrated with several different customs, such as First-Footing, which involves friends or family members going to each other's houses with a gift of whisky and sometimes a lump of coal.

In Edinburgh, it now covers four days of processions, concerts and fireworks, with the street party beginning on Hogmanay. Alternative tickets are available for entrance into the Princes Street Gardens concert and Céilidh, where well-known artists perform and ticket holders can participate in traditional Scottish céilidh dancing. On New Year's Day the celebrations continue with the Stoats Loony Dook parade.

The Edinburgh Hogmanay celebrations are among the largest in the world. Celebrations in Edinburgh in 1996–97 were recognised by the Guinness Book of Records at the world's largest New Year party, with approximately 400,000 people in attendance. Numbers have since been restricted due to safety concerns.

=== Fireworks displays ===
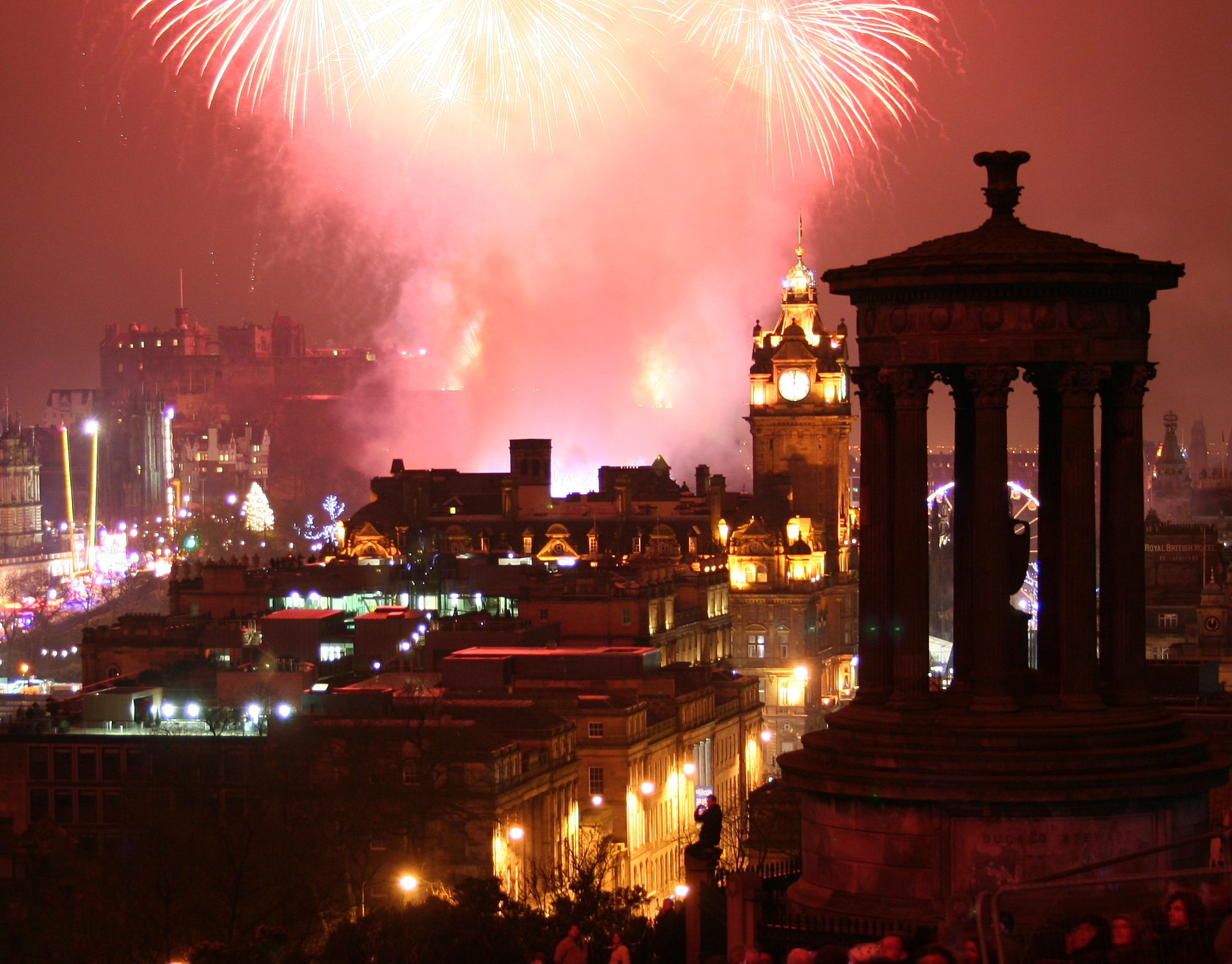
Fireworks in Edinburgh celebrating Hogmanay

Edinburgh, the Scottish capital, hosts one of the world's most famous New Year celebrations. The celebration is focused on a major street party along Princes Street. The cannon is fired at Edinburgh Castle at the stroke of midnight, followed by a large fireworks display. Edinburgh hosts a festival of four or five days, beginning on 28 December, and lasting until New Year's Day or 2 January, which is also a bank holiday in Scotland.

=== Other Scottish cities ===
Other cities across Scotland, such as Aberdeen, Glasgow and Stirling have large organised celebrations too, including fireworks at midnight.

== See also ==
- Christmas in Scotland
