= Arthur J. Stone =

Leading American silversmith

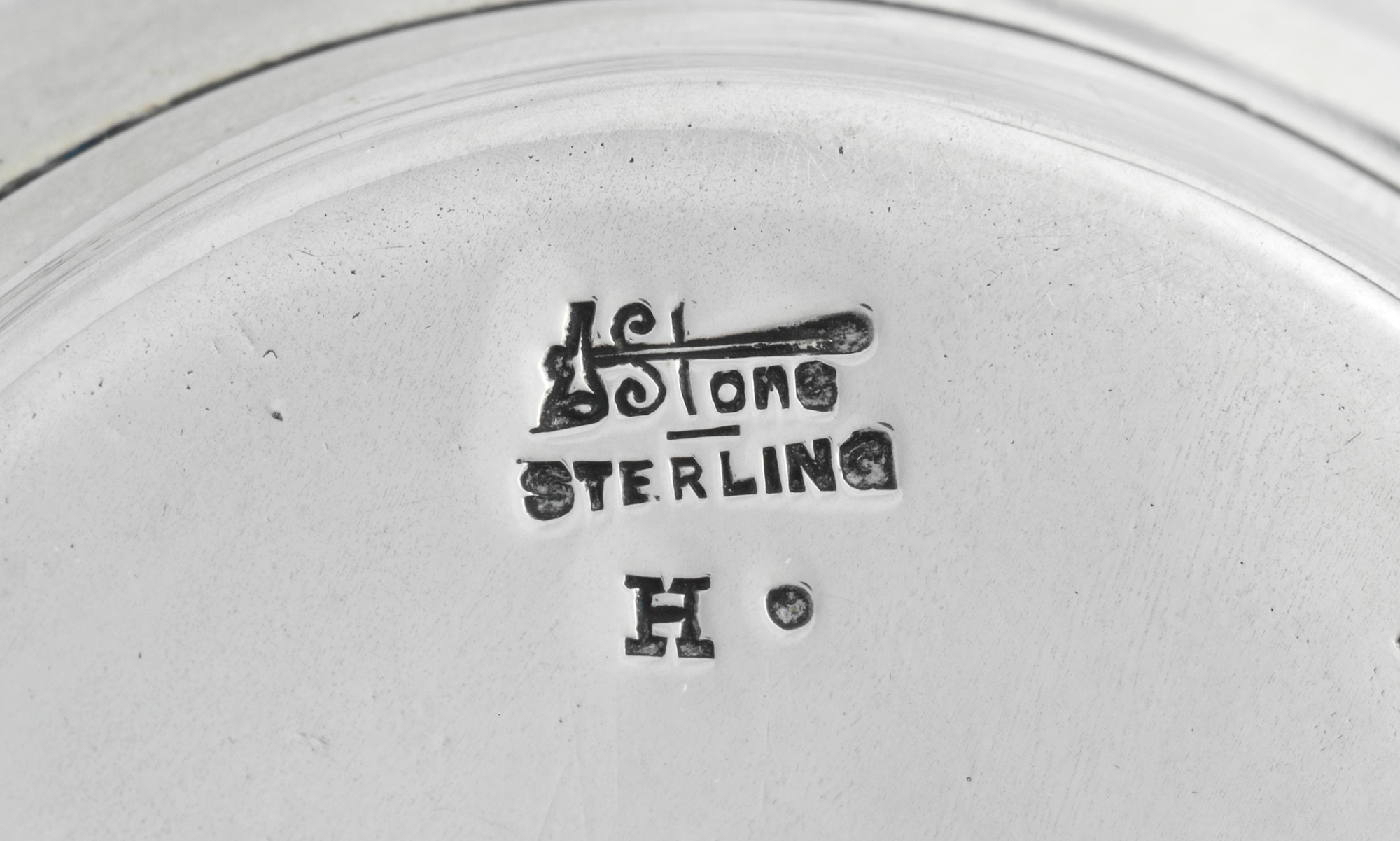
Arthur J. Stone's trade mark

Arthur J. Stone (1847–1938), a leading American silversmith, was born, trained and worked in Sheffield, England, and Edinburgh, Scotland, before travelling to the United States in 1884. He was one of the last silversmiths in America to train apprentices to carry out designs in hand-wrought silver. In 1901, Stone set up a workshop in Gardner, Massachusetts which operated under his name until its sale in 1937 to Henry Heywood. Heywood was a Gardner businessman, who renamed it The Stone Silver Shop, and later, Stone Associates. Heywood died in 1945. His sons Henry Jr. and Jerome ran Stone Associates until 1957.

One of the silversmiths in Arthur Stone's shop was George Porter Blanchard, father of silversmith Porter Blanchard.
