= Stones (surname) =

Stones is a surname. Notable people with the surname include:

- Craig Stones (born 1980), English footballer
- David Stones (born 1988), American musician
- Dwight Stones (born 1953), American high jumper and television commentator
- E. L. G. Stones (1914–1987), British historian of the Middle Ages
- John Stones (born 1994), English footballer
- Margaret Stones (1920–2018), Australian botanical illustrator
- Tad Stones (born c. 1952), American animator, screenwriter, producer and director

== See also ==
- Stone (surname)
- Stones (disambiguation)
