= William Oliver Stone =

American painter (1830–1875)

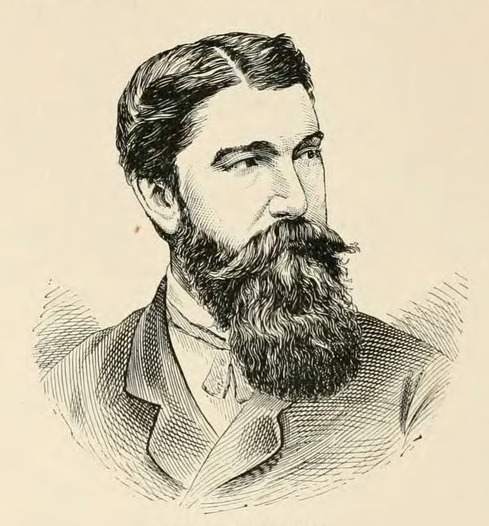
- Born: 26 September 1830
- Died: 15 September 1875 (aged 44)
- Occupation: Painter

William Oliver Stone (September 26, 1830 – September 15, 1875) was an American portrait painter.

Stone was born in Derby, Connecticut, to a prominent family. He studied under Nathaniel Jocelyn in New Haven from 1848, until Jocelyn's studio suffered a catastrophic fire in 1849. Stone moved to New York in 1851, where he opened his own studio, and became a successful portrait painter. He became an associate member of the National Academy of Design in 1856, and full member in 1859, exhibiting in each of the academy's annual exhibitions from 1861 through his early death, in Newport, Rhode Island, in 1875. Two of his better-known portraits are of Cyrus West Field (in a private collection) and of William Wilson Corcoran (in the Walters Art Museum).
