= Edward James Stone =

English astronomer

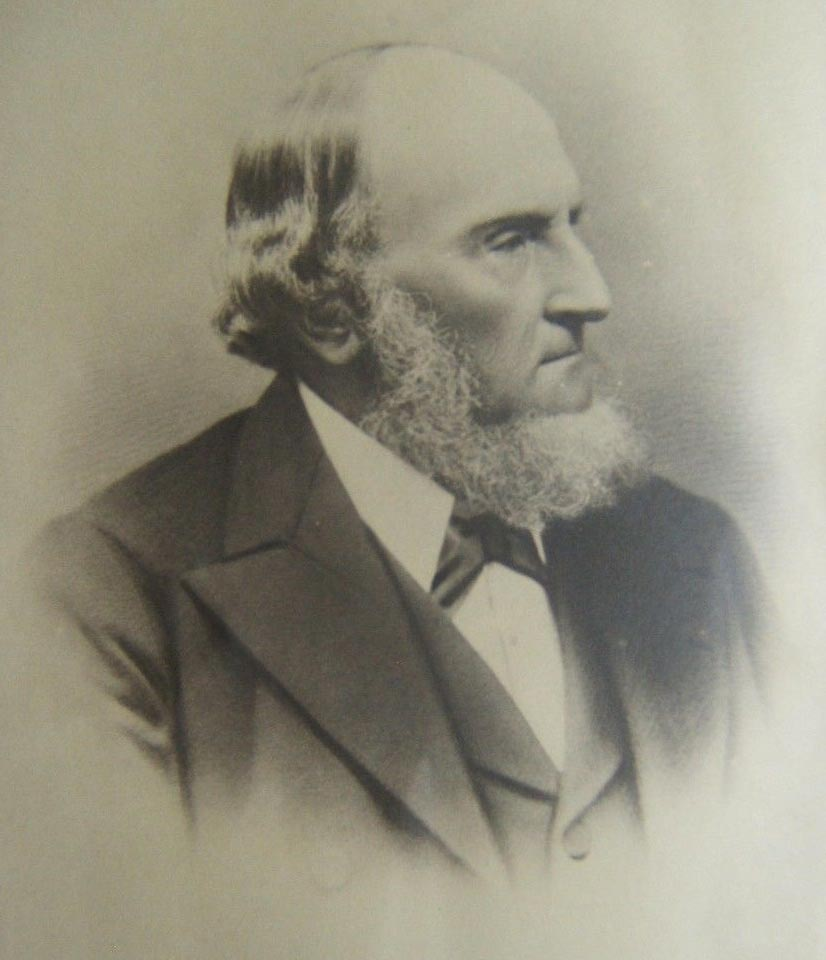
- Frontispiece from Volume 20 of The Observatory (1897)
- Born: 28 February 1831; Notting Hill, London, England
- Died: 6 May 1897 (aged 66)
- Resting place: St Sepulchre's Cemetery
- Education: King's College London, Queens' College, Cambridge
- Spouse: Grace Tuckett
- Children: 4
- Scientific career
- Fields: Astronomy

Edward James Stone FRS FRAS (28 February 1831 – 6 May 1897) was an English astronomer.

== Life and career ==
He was born in Notting Hill, London to Edward and Sarah Stone. Educated at the City of London School, he obtained a studentship at King's College London, and in 1856 a scholarship at Queens' College, Cambridge, where he graduated as fifth wrangler in 1859, and was immediately elected fellow of his college.

The following year he succeeded the Rev. Robert Main as chief assistant at the Royal Greenwich Observatory, and at once undertook the fundamental task of improving astronomical constants. The most important of these, the Sun's mean parallax, was at that time subject to considerable uncertainty. He obtained a value for the solar parallax by observations of Mars in 1860 and 1862. He later refined his estimate by examining observations of the transit of Venus of 1769. He also studied the lunar parallax, and determined the mass of the Moon, and obtained a value for the constant of nutation. He was elected a Fellow of the Royal Society in 1868.

He was awarded the Gold Medal of the Royal Astronomical Society in 1869, and on the resignation of Sir Thomas Maclear in 1870 he was appointed Her Majesty's astronomer at the Cape of Good Hope. His first task on taking up this post was the reduction and publication of a large mass of observations left by his predecessor, from a selected portion of which (those made 1856–1860) he compiled a catalogue of 1,159 stars. His principal work was, however, a catalogue of 12,441 stars to the 7th magnitude between the South Pole and 25°S declination, which was practically finished by the end of 1878 and published in 1881.

Shortly after the death of Main on 9 May 1878, Stone was appointed to succeed him as Radcliffe Observer at Oxford, and he left the Cape on 27 May 1879. At Oxford he extended the Cape observations of stars to the 7th magnitude from 25°S declination to the equator, and collected the results in the Radcliffe catalogue for 1890, which contains the places of 6,424 stars.

Stone observed the transit of Venus of 1874 at the Cape, and organized the government expeditions for the corresponding event in 1882. He was elected President of the Royal Astronomical Society (1882–1884), and he was the first to recognize the importance of the old observations accumulated at the Radcliffe Observatory by Hornsby, Robertson and Rigaud. He successfully observed the total solar eclipse of 8 August 1896 at Novaya Zemlya, and intended a voyage to India for the eclipse of 1898, but died suddenly at the Radcliffe Observatory. The number of his astronomical publications exceeds 150, but his reputation depends mainly on his earlier work at Greenwich and his two great star catalogues—the Cape catalogue for 1880 and the Radcliffe catalogue for 1890. He was elected to honorary membership of the Manchester Literary and Philosophical Society on 17 April 1894.

== Personal life ==
He had married Grace Tuckett; they had at least four children.
