= Stoats Porridge Bars =

Scottish food company

Stoats Porridge Bars Ltd
- Type: Private
- Industry: Baked goods
- Founded: 2004
- Founders: Tony Stone and Bob Arnott
- Headquarters: Edinburgh, Scotland, UK
- Area served: Worldwide
- Products: Porridge, Muesli, Oat bars
- Website: www.eatstoats.com

Stoats is a British company which sells porridge and other oat based products based in Edinburgh, Scotland. Stoats was founded in 2005 and retails in Britain and other countries.

== History ==
Porridge producer Stoats was founded by Tony Stone and Bob Arnott. Originally planning to sell porridge in the centre of Edinburgh in a large café bar, Stone and Arnott could not secure funding. With help from The Prince's Trust, they began a business selling hot food at UK music festivals and farmers' markets in a converted hot dog cart named the "Stoats Porridge Bar".

The Edinburgh food company progressed from the porridge trailer to marketing porridge oat bars, as the bars had become popular in Scotland. Initially based in Scotland, Stoats is now sold at Tesco and Waitrose. Stoats provided 10,000 porridge bars to runners in the 2007 New York City Marathon and 26,000 bowls of porridge to athletes at the 2012 London Olympic Games.

Stoats now sell a range of oat based products including porridge, quick porridge, porridge oat bars and oatcakes.

== PR and sponsorship ==
In 2007 Stoats broke the Guinness World Record for the largest bowl of porridge ever made. The 81.2 kg bowl was equivalent to 2000 normal-sized bowls. The event was staged at the Castle Street Farmers' Market in Edinburgh.

In 2016 Stoats were title sponsor of the Loony Dook.

Stoats was the official 2016 partner of the World Porridge Day.
