= Tom Stone (wrestler) =

American professional wrestler

Personal information
- Born: June 10, 1954 (age 72)

Professional wrestling career
- Ring name(s): Tom "Rocky" Stone; Doctor X The Executioner; Steve Hall, Tompall Mendicino
- Billed height: 5'11
- Billed weight: 245 lb (111 kg)
- Billed from: Baton Rouge, Louisiana
- Debut: 1978
- Retired: 2006

Steven Hall is a retired American professional wrestler who appeared primarily under the name Tom "Rocky" Stone. He wrestled with the American Wrestling Association (AWA) from 1978 until the promotion ended, and the World Wrestling Federation (WWF) from 1987 to 1995. Hall was one of the AWA's main trainers for preliminary wrestlers who performed on the company's weekly TV series AWA All-Star Wrestling. One of his former students, Tough Tom of Disorderly Conduct, claimed Hall was the best trainer in the Midwestern United States during the 1980s wrestling boom.

== Early life ==
Stone's father, Red Hall, was a popular Milwaukee disc jockey and was the ring announcer for wrestling shows at the Milwaukee Arena. It was primarily through his father's connections that Stone was able to enter pro wrestling.

== Career ==
Stone initially wrestled under his real name during his early career with stints in the St. Louis Wrestling Club, Central States Wrestling and Mid-South Wrestling. Stone began wrestling full-time with the AWA in 1978. Then, Stone made his WWF debut in 1987, appearing frequently as a jobber. He would go on to be remembered primarily for this work, and was an outstanding trainer for other wrestlers. During the declining days of the AWA, he received greater billing (including wrestling tag-team matches with Nick Bockwinkel), though he still routinely lost to the AWA's recognized stars. He was also one of the notable jobbers (along with Jake Milliman) to take part in the AWA's Team Challenge Series.

Leading up to the WWF's 1990 Survivor Series, as part of a storyline involving Jake "The Snake" Roberts being blinded by Rick Martel, Stone defeated Roberts via disqualification. Stone was also the promoter of Wisconsin based Mid American Wrestling, the NAWF and the Independent Association of Wrestling during the 1990s, appearing as masked wrestler Doctor X. He also wrestled extensively throughout the Midwest for many independent promotions. In 2021, Stone released an autobiography of his 30 year wrestling career entitled "Professional Wrestling - The Theatre of the Absurd: I Never Wanted to be a Big Star".

== Championships and accomplishments ==
- Pro Wrestling Illustrated
  - PWI ranked him # 456 of the 500 best singles wrestlers in the PWI 500 in 1991
  - PWI ranked him # 487 of the 500 best singles wrestlers in the PWI 500 in 1992
