= Billy Stone (Australian footballer) =

Australian rules footballer

Personal information
- Full name: William Henry James George Stone
- Born: 6 May 1901
- Died: 14 December 1993 (aged 92)
- Original team: Coburg
- Height: 173 cm (5 ft 8 in)
- Weight: 65 kg (143 lb)

Playing career^{1}
Years	Club	Games (Goals)
1925	Carlton	1 (1)
- ^{1} Playing statistics correct to the end of 1925.

Billy Stone (6 May 1901 – 14 December 1993) was an Australian rules footballer who played with Carlton in the Victorian Football League (VFL).
