= David John Anthony Stone =

British military historian

David Stone
- Born: David John Anthony Stone; 1947 (age 78–79)
- Education: Royal Military Academy Sandhurst
- Occupation: Historian
- Writing career
- Language: English
- Period: 1998–2015
- Subject: Military history
- Military career
- Branch: British Army
- Service years: 1965–2002
- Rank: Lieutenant colonel
- Commands: 1st Battalion, Duke of Edinburgh's Royal Regiment
- Awards: Abzeichen für Leistungen im Truppendienst in Gold (1987)

David John Anthony Stone (born 1947) is an established military author and historian and a former British army officer. Most of his books on various aspects of military conflict have been written and published since he retired from active military duty in 2002, including several studies on the Prussian and German armies throughout the course of history: an area in which his particular expertise is today acknowledged both in the UK and abroad. He is a Member of the Society of Authors and of several other professional, literary and historical or heritage-related groups and organisations. He has maintained a close connection with the heritage and historical perspectives of his former regiment, serving from 2002 to 2015 as a senior trustee of what is today The Rifles (Berkshire and Wiltshire) Museum at Salisbury. He was elected a Fellow of the Chartered Management Institute in 1994 and a Member of the Institute of Directors in 2000. He is married and lives in NSW, Australia.

== Military career ==
Stone was educated in Devon and Cheshire before beginning his military career at the Royal Military Academy Sandhurst (RMAS) in 1965. On graduating from the RMAS at the end of the two-year regular officers commissioning course, he was commissioned into The Duke of Edinburgh's Royal Regiment (Berkshire and Wiltshire) in July 1967. Subsequently, his time as a British army infantry officer spanned 35 years to 2002, involving him in service across much of the globe. His principal duty stations included West Germany, West Berlin, the reunified Germany post-1991, Belgium, Hong Kong, the Former Republic of Yugoslavia (Croatia and Bosnia) and the United Kingdom, including Northern Ireland. He also served various tours of duty and assignments in the US, Canada, Cyprus, France, Scandinavia, Malaysia, Nepal, and Brunei. As a lieutenant colonel, he commanded the 1st Battalion, The Duke of Edinburgh's Royal Regiment (Berkshire and Wiltshire) (1 DERR), prior to and after which he carried out a diverse range of command, staff, training and other assignments in the UK and elsewhere. His operational experience included command at platoon, company and battalion level with 1 DERR as well as in other regimental and non-regimental staff and other appointments. He was awarded a Mention in Despatches in 1984. He is a graduate of the Army Staff College Camberley and the US Army John F. Kennedy Special Warfare Centre, in addition to various other UK and NATO training centres, including the NATO School (SHAPE) at Oberammergau, Germany. During his service, he spent a total of 14 years in Germany and, as his publisher notes, 'Many of these assignments afford[ed] him a unique opportunity to research and write on the German experience of war.' Frequently serving alongside or with German troops in NATO appointments, he was awarded the Bundeswehr Abzeichen für Leistungen im Truppendienst in Gold in 1987.

== Literary career ==
Although already a published author within the military prior to 2002 (see bibliography), since retiring from the army Stone has developed a successful second career researching and writing on military conflicts and related topics, drawing extensively upon his own service assignments, experiences and travels where appropriate, while in addition giving occasional talks and lectures to general audiences, students, historical societies and literary groups. These talks have reflected the subject matter of his books, as well as aspects of his time as a former soldier and his post-2002 experiences as an historian and writer, including the practicalities of producing a work for publication.

In Cold War Warriors (1998), the authorised history of his former regiment, Stone provides a detailed account of the life and times of a British infantry regiment during the Cold War era. A review by 'CH' in Soldier magazine in 1999 included the comment that 'while [Cold War Warriors is] an admirably comprehensive diary and record of "human endeavor", [it] should be seen as far more – as a reflection of the times, setting the experiences of a relatively short lifespan [of the regiment] against a significant yet transient part of our history' and '[Stone's] views [are] worthy of respect, coming from one who has commanded a fine county regiment and then recorded its life and times against the background of a fast-changing Army and society.'

With 'First Reich': Inside the German Army During the War with France 1870–71 (2002), Stone established himself as a mainstream military historian and author, with a particular interest and expertise in German military history. In recounting and analysing all aspects of what is usually termed the Franco-Prussian War, and the forces of Prussia and the North German Confederation in particular detail, Stone also argues that the Second German Empire established in 1871 should more properly have been categorised by history as the first truly 'German' empire: hence the title chosen for this work. In 2002, Pennant magazine described the study as 'a fascinating history, very well researched and illustrated', while in 2003 Brian Murphy in Military History magazine noted that this work 'is a wise, timely and much-needed evaluation of the conflict that perfected the modern German war machine and its influence on world events up to the present.'

In Wars of the Cold War (2004), Stone draws upon his own first-hand experience of the period 1945–90 and takes a fresh perspective on the Cold War years, suggesting that this conflict might quite properly be regarded as a Third World War, in light of the global nature of the numerous sub-conflicts which accompanied – and were influenced and informed by – the overarching international power struggles between East and West and between democracy, communism and nationalism that ensued between 1945 and 1990. Stone incorporates the Cuban Missile Crisis, and the Vietnamese, Korean and first Gulf Wars into this particular study, in addition to analysing the principal revolts, insurrections and conflicts across the Middle East, Africa and in Europe, as well as the Soviet Union's war in Afghanistan. He also suggests that the NATO-Warsaw Pact confrontation in Central Europe was itself a form of warfare, and that the true nature and extent of this particular aspect of the Cold War has frequently been understated or deliberately downplayed both during and since the conflict; together with some of the less desirable impacts and new threats that have emerged in its wake. Wars of the Cold War was described in 2004 as 'an authoritative study of the conflicts and armed disputes that took place in the period', with 'succinct descriptions [put] into the broader context of the age. David Stone combines a soldier's eye for detail with an historian's sense of time and place.'

Also published in 2004 was Battles in Focus: Dien Bien Phu 1954, in which Stone focuses upon a specific Cold War conflict and examines in detail the final stages of the ill-fated French campaign in Indochina; specifically the pivotal and ultimately disastrous defensive battle fought by the French airborne (paratroop), Foreign Legion, colonial, regional and other army units against the People's Army of Vietnam and Viet Minh forces close to the border with Laos in 1954.

In War Summits: The Meetings that Shaped World War II and the Postwar World (2006), Stone draws upon his own experience of the process of planning and policy making at high-level NATO and UK military headquarters and at the UK Ministry of Defence (where he served 1992–95) to inform his analysis of the series of meetings between Churchill, Roosevelt and Stalin and their staffs during the period 1940–1946. In 2006, a Pennant magazine review of War Summits noted that 'the author is to be congratulated on what will become a valuable reference work.' The NYMAS (New York Military Affairs Symposium) Review noted that 'War Summits is the first comprehensive survey of the dozen or so strategy-shaping meetings of the principal Allied leaders' and that 'Although War Summits cannot provide a highly detailed look at each of the summits, it does give even the serious student of the war an excellent overview, often with very valuable analysis.'

Fighting For The Fatherland: The Story of the German Soldier from 1648 to the Present Day (2006), an examination of German soldiery and the Prussian and German army throughout the course of history since the Thirty Years' War, sees Stone return to his principal area of expertise. This book achieved 'runner up' to the winning title in the Military and Aviation Book Club awards in the 'best military history of 2006' category. Michael A. Boden, writing in Armor journal noted that ‘Stone does an excellent and noteworthy job of illuminating the life of the German soldier within the context of German social and military culture.’ The British military historian Professor Richard Holmes described this work as 'The most comprehensible and accessible account of the German soldier ever published in English. It also shows, once again, the merit of having such a history written by an author who blends military experience with academic perception.' The Good Book Guide review described the work as 'a penetrating look at how these formidable fighters "für Gott und Vaterland" came into existence.' A NYMAS Review in 2007 concluded that this work was 'A valuable read for anyone interested in military history.' The Officer magazine described it as 'the ground breaking and comprehensive study of one of history's most formidable war machines.' The Nottingham Evening Post, reviewer 'WO' observed that Fighting for the Fatherland was 'Well written' and that 'it is refreshing to find a book that deals equitably with the German Army.'

In 2006–7, Stone's particular expertise and knowledge in the area of the German army of World War II was recognised by Publications International Ltd. (USA) in 2006, when he was engaged as a consultant and co-author for that publisher's project to produce the major work World War II Chronicle (2007) under the Legacy imprint. That same year, he was engaged by the South West Film & TV Archive (SWFTA) to analyse a newly discovered 16mm film taken by a German military cameraman in Russia during World War II. His findings and final report were subsequently used by SWFTA to support public showings of the film, as well as to inform any further research concerned with it. His work was also used by a local newspaper in February 2007 as the basis of an article about both the contents and the discovery of the film. In 2012, his initial research into this World War II film and the activities it portrayed was acknowledged in a comprehensive historical analysis and full account of the subject by Professor G.H. Bennett of Plymouth University.

In 2009, Stone's eighth book was published. This was Hitler's Army, 1939–45: The Men, Machines and Organization. C. Peter Chen of World War II Database wrote, 'Hitler's Army is a great start in getting to learn about this WW2-era German Army that, even in its waning days, proved to be a powerful adversary for its opponents... [T]his work was a great primer and perhaps a handy reference to keep around.' Although born after the war, Stone's indirect links with this period were highlighted in a newspaper article following a talk given by Stone about the book in 2009, when it was noted that, ‘One of his duties [as a young army officer in 1972] included spending time at Spandau Prison in West Berlin guarding Rudolf Hess, the last remaining Nazi war criminal [serving his sentence at that gaol following conviction at Nuremberg in 1946].' LTC Robert A. Lynn, reviewing the book in 2009, described Hitler's Army 1939–1945 as 'the essential reference for anyone seeking a definitive explanation and analysis of one of the world's most formidable fighting forces.'

David Stone's ninth book was Twilight of the Gods: The Decline and Fall of the German General Staff in World War II, published in 2011. The US co-edition of this work was titled Shattered Genius: The Decline and Fall of the German General Staff in World War II. In an endorsement of Twilight of the Gods Richard Dannatt (General the Lord Dannatt GCB CBE MC DL), Chief of the General Staff of the British army 2006–2009, stated, 'How the mighty are fallen! This brilliant study of the demise of the once great German General Staff is a captivating read. It is a must for professional and casual readers alike.' A review of the book in May 2012 stated, 'This is a masterly account of the turbulent relationship between, on the one hand, a superbly trained [German] General Staff imbued with Prussian tenets of effectiveness and honour, and, on the other, a cold-blooded entirely pragmatic regime led by Hitler and Himmler, careless of honour and fatally ambitious.' In a comprehensive review of the book for the Royal United Services Institute (RUSI) Journal in August 2012, Mungo Melvin, concluded that 'Twilight of the Gods represents an important contribution to the study of the Second World War. Stone provides the best overall account of the German General Staff since Walter Görlitz's classic study of the early 1950s.'

In June 2015, the publication of David Stone's tenth book, The Kaiser's Army: The German Army in World War One, provided in practice a sequel to 'First Reich' and a prequel to Hitler's Army, 1939-45, enabling him to expand upon and update his earlier coverage of the German army of that period in Fighting for the Fatherland. The Kaiser's Army was endorsed by the eminent historian and historical biographer Ian Mortimer, who wrote, "A hugely impressive book. It not only provides an astonishing abundance of factual material but is also compellingly readable. It draws you in by providing a lucid and thought-provoking account of the army's development in the march to war, and imparts some powerful lessons in human ingenuity and political misjudgement. Ultimately, it is deeply satisfying, for it delivers everything that you expect, and more".

Note: British born David J. A. Stone (but who usually writes as 'David Stone') is not to be confused with the American thriller-writer, author of The Echelon Vendetta, who publishes under the same name; or with David R. Stone, an historian who writes on Russia and the Soviet Union.

== Bibliography ==
=== Published works as sole author ===
- The Kaiser's Army: The German Army in World War One, Bloomsbury Publishing Plc (2015), ISBN 978-1-8448-6235-1
- Twilight of the Gods: The Decline and Fall of the German General Staff in World War II, Conway (2011) ISBN 978-1-84486-136-1
- Hitler’s Army: The Men, Machines and Organisation 1939–1945, Conway (2009) ISBN 978-1-84486-084-5
- Fighting For The Fatherland: The Story of the German Soldier From 1648 to the Present Day, Conway (2006) ISBN 978-1-84486-036-4
- War Summits: The Meetings That Shaped World War II and the Postwar World, Potomac Books Inc. (2005) ISBN 1-57488-901-X
- Battles in Focus: Dien Bien Phu 1954, Brassey's (2004) ISBN 1-85753-372-0
- Wars of the Cold War: Campaigns and Conflicts, 1945–1990, Brassey's (2004) ISBN 1-85753-342-9
- 'First Reich': Inside the German Army During the War with France 1870–71, Brassey’s (2002) ISBN 1-85753-341-0
- Cold War Warriors: The Story of the Duke of Edinburgh's Royal Regiment (Berkshire and Wiltshire), 1959–1994, Pen & Sword Books Ltd. (1998) ISBN 0-85052-618-3

=== Published work as consultant and co-author ===
- World War II Chronicle, Legacy (Publications International, Ltd.) (2007) ISBN 1-4127-1378-1
