= B. Jeff Stone =

B. Jeff Stone (24 April 1936 – 26 August 2011) was an American rockabilly and country singer and songwriter. After first recording in the 1950s, he achieved particular success in Europe from the 1990s onward, and was inducted to the Rockabilly Hall of Fame.

He was born in San Antonio, Texas, and began playing guitar at the age of eight. He first recorded in 1954 for the SARG company in Luling, Texas, before winning a regular slot on radio station KBOP in Pleasanton, Texas with his group, the Texas Cut-Ups. Following a period in the US Air Force, he returned to San Antonio and formed a new group, initially called the Westernairs. After recording a country hit single, "Hey, Little Newsboy", the band changed their name to the Newsboys. In the late 1960s, he started a solo career and toured with Marty Robbins, Willie Nelson, and others.

After giving up performances in the mid-1970s, he started a construction company, moving from Fort Worth to live in Corsicana in 1985. In 1995, he decided to record again, and his traditionally-styled country album Everybody Loves Me and single "A Good Woman's Love" became successful in Europe, where he toured. He recorded several further albums, Something's Going On (1996), Texas Country (1998), Stone Country (1999) and Stone Tradition (2000), and had one of his biggest single hits in 1997 with "Hello, Mr. Heartache".

Stone died at the age of 75 in Tyler, Texas.
