= William H. Stone (politician) =

American politician

William H. Stone served in the California Assembly representing District 18. He is most known for stabbing fellow assemblyman John C. Bell (who died 4 days later) on the Assembly Floor in 1860.
