= Tom Stone (photographer) =

American humanitarian photographer (born 1971)

Tom Stone (born July 12, 1971) is an American humanitarian photographer. His work depicts the discrepancy between the American dream and the American reality, clearly captured through the telling faces of those living on the fringes of society. He is most widely known for his documentary photography of outsider, displaced and homeless populations in California.

== Early life ==
Born in a Pullman compartment on a train outside Mexico City traveling to Puerto Ángel in Oaxaca, Mexico, Tom Stone spent his earliest years with his mother, Raya Ra, and father, Tony Washington (both parents using assumed names). In a recent interview, he discussed that his mother was physically abused; and, fear for her safety (and that of her son), "fled" – first "sleeping in bushes in wealthy L.A. neighborhoods" and eventually joining the famed Source Family.

Given the Aquarian name Sound by Father Yod, Stone and his mother (renamed Astral) lived in Hawaii with family over the next three years. Stone lived with Astral and her boyfriend, Djin Aquarian (lead guitarist of Yahowha 13)until he was 12. Later he moved from Hawaii to L.A. to Seattle and back to L.A, where the three spent months living in a van on the streets of Venice.

His mother has always encouraged Stone to reach his full potentials in life. She home-schooled until she decided to break with Djin to give her son a better and "stationary" life. With his grandfather financing his formal education, Stone enrolled in the 7th grade at the Highland Hall Waldorf School. He continued his creative pursuits, producing art in various mediums including acrylic paintings and watercolor. His interest piqued by the musicals and plays he did while attending high school at Harvard-Westlake School in North Hollywood, CA, Stone branched out to creative writing and film during his college years at Harvard University in Cambridge, MA.

After graduating Harvard with a degree in Computer Science, Stone joined Morgan Stanley as a financial analyst. He worked first in the company's Health Care Group and subsequently in its Technology Group during Frank Quattrone's tenure and thereafter. Notably, he took flash memory maker Sandisk public (IPO). He was also CFO at Autoweb.com and Reply! Inc.

Stone continued onward with his creativity, and began spending time doing documentary video work. While creating videos, Stone grew interested in documenting the gripping stories of street kids, and he began his still photography "as a research tool for that." What began as an aid for another medium has since become Stone's life work of intimate portraits of society's readily forgotten.

== Art and career ==
Stone's work has been shown at galleries and events, such as the San Francisco Museum of Modern Art Artist's Gallery. His photographs center the conditions of Americans experiencing homelessness. He is represented by DNJ gallery in Santa Monica, CA.

Stone describes his work as "Photography that's about increasing the pool of people who are focused on making lives better in their own cities and towns."

Stone has exhibited works in the cities of Los Angeles, San Francisco, Miami, and Freiburg, Germany. He has been published extensively, including ongoing contributions to Rolling Stone and Alternative Press.

== Quotes ==
- On Poverty

I think there's a decided middle spectrum of humanity where circumstance, luck, and small choices conspire to vastly differing fates. We’re all imperfect, and most of us are only a shadow of who we’d hoped we’d be.

To my thinking, the original human trauma is our separation. We are too close not to need each other; and too far to trust each other.

I count it as a measure of our ignorance, the depth of poverty in the world. It's a glaring marker to how far we have not come.

The younger you are the more you are affected by the sight of poverty and homelessness. Pay attention to how children react to folks on the street. I try to be disturbed by the same things that disturb kids.

- On Photography

The photo is a memento of the interaction.

A cloudy reflection is sometimes better than none.
