= William Henry Stone (physician) =

English physician

William Henry Stone FRCP (5 July 1830, London – 5 July 1891, Wandsworth, London) was an English physician, known for his studies on electro-therapy and the electrical properties of the human body.

== Biography ==
After education at Charterhouse School, William Henry Stone matriculated at Balliol College, Oxford on 30 November 1848. He graduated there B.A. in 1852 and M.A. in 1855. He was a medical student at St Thomas’ Hospital and graduated there with B.M. degree in 1856. After a brief visit to Trinidad as a medical inspector of health, Stone returned in 1857 to St Thomas' Hospital as medical registrar. In 1861 he was appointed physician to the Surrey Dispensary and assistant physician to the Royal Brompton Hospital. At St Thomas' Hospital, he lectured on forensic medicine, became in 1874 assistant physician and lecturer on materia medica and physics, and became in 1882 full physician; he retired there in the summer of 1890 due to health problems. In 1863 he was elected F.R.C.P.

In 1868 Stone became physician to the London office of the Clergy Mutual Assurance Society and continued in that capacity for many years. His successor at the insurance company was J. Kingston Fowler. Stone was a vice-president of the Physical Society of London.

Stone delivered, to the Royal College of Physicians, the Croonian Lecture (On some Applications of Physics to Medicine) in 1879. He delivered the Lumleian Lectures (The Electrical Condition of the Human Body: Man as a Conductor and Electrolyte) in 1886 and the Harveian Oration in 1887.
