= David B. Stone =

David Barnes Stone (September 2, 1927 – April 12, 2010) was an American businessman who led an investment firm called the North American Management Corp. However, Stone was best known as the principal founder of the New England Aquarium, which opened in Boston, Massachusetts, in 1969 as part of the redevelopment of the city's waterfront.

Stone, who was raised in Brookline, Massachusetts, was the third child of Robert and Betty Stone. He attended The Park School and graduated from the Milton Academy. He became a merchant marine during World War II, graduating from the US Merchant Marine Academy. Stone later earned a bachelor's degree from Harvard University in 1950 and received his MBA, also from Harvard, in 1952.

Stone began envisioning an aquarium for the redeveloped Boston waterfront in the late 1950s. He began serving as the future New England Aquarium's board of directors in 1959. Stone, and the New England Aquarium's other principal co-founder, Henry "Hal" Lyman spent much of the 1960s planning and fundraising for the proposed aquarium.

Stone chose then 26-year-old architect Peter Chermayeff to design the aquarium, his first such design. Chermayeff has since designed more than 20 aquariums worldwide. The New England Aquarium opened to the public in June 1969. Stone continued to serve on the aquarium's board of directors until 1976.

David Stone died at Massachusetts General Hospital from complications of a stroke on April 12, 2010, at the age of 82.
