= Christopher Stone (cricketer) =

English cricketer

Personal information
- Born: 11 May 1951 (age 75); St Neots, Huntingdonshire, England
- Batting: Right-handed
- Bowling: Right-arm off break

Domestic team information
- Years: Team
- 1974: Bedfordshire
- 1982–1990: Dorset

Career statistics
Competition	List A
Matches	5
Runs scored	65
Batting average	16.25
100s/50s	0/0
Top score	32*
Balls bowled	294
Wickets	3
Bowling average	57.00
5 wickets in innings	0
10 wickets in match	0
Best bowling	2/44
Catches/stumpings	0/–
- Source: Cricinfo, 17 March 2010

Christopher Stone (born 11 May 1951) is a former English cricketer. Stone was a right-handed batsman who was a right-arm off break bowler.

Stone made his debut for Bedfordshire in the 1974 Minor Counties Championship against Cambridgeshire. Stone played eight Minor Counties matches for Bedfordshire in the 1974 season, with his final match for the county coming against Buckinghamshire.

Stone made his debut for Dorset in the 1982 Minor Counties Championship against Cornwall. From 1982 to 1990 Stone represented Dorset in 76 Minor Counties matches, with his final match coming against Buckinghamshire.

Stone also played five List-A cricket matches for Dorset, with his debut List-A match coming against Essex in the first round of the 1983 NatWest Trophy. Stone played four further List-A matches for Dorset, with his final List-A match for the county coming in the first round of the 1990 NatWest Trophy against Glamorgan.
