= Christopher Stone (professor) =

American law professor in UK

Christopher Stone is an American criminal justice expert who became the professor of practice of public integrity at the Blavatnik School of Government at the University of Oxford.

== Life ==
Stone received his AB from Harvard, an MPhil. in criminology from the University of Cambridge, and his JD from the Yale Law School.

Stone was president and director of the Vera Institute of Justice. He was the director of Vera's London office, as the founding director of the Neighborhood Defender Service of Harlem, a nonprofit, community-based public defender in New York City, and as one of three founding directors of the New York State Capital Defender Office. He also initiated the Institute's work on justice reform in South Africa, Russia, Chile, and China. He joined the Harvard Kennedy School in 2004, In 2006 he was awarded an OBE for contributions to criminal justice reform in the United Kingdom.

Stone was the president of the Open Society Foundations from 2012–2017, the global grantmaking network founded by George Soros. Prior to assuming that position in July 2012, he served as the Guggenheim Professor of the Practice of Criminal Justice at the Harvard Kennedy School from 2005–2012. While at Harvard University, Stone also served as the faculty chair of the Program in Criminal Justice Policy and Management and as the faculty director of the Hauser Center for Nonprofit Organizations. His work at Harvard included research on justice reform in China and Turkey, the development of performance indicators for the justice sector in developing countries, and research on the establishment of the International Criminal Court.

Stone became the professor of practice of public integrity at the Blavatnik School of Government at the University of Oxford.

== Publications ==
Martha Chizuma, who was the director of the Anti-Corruption Bureau in Malawi, was arrested. Three days after her arrest she addressed a crowd concerning her determination to end corruption. She and Stone published a paper in 2024 on the "Conundrum of Independence:Taking up the leadership of anti-corruption institutions" while she was still leading the ACB.
