= David Stone (footballer) =

English footballer (born 1942)

Personal information
- Full name: David Kenneth Stone
- Date of birth: 29 December 1942 (age 83)
- Place of birth: Bristol, England
- Position: Wing half

Youth career
- Bristol Boys
- Sneyd Park
- 1959–1960: Bristol Rovers

Senior career*
Years	Team	Apps	(Gls)
1960–1968	Bristol Rovers	148	(6)
1968	Southend United	6	(0)
1968–1969	Hastings United	25	(3)
1969–1970	Glastonbury		
1970	Minehead		
1970–1976	Welton Rovers		
1976–1981	Weston-super-Mare		
1981–1986	Portway Bristol		
Total		154	(6)

Managerial career
- 1968–1969: Hastings United
- 1972–1976: Welton Rovers
- 1978–1981: Weston-super-Mare
- 1981–1986: Portway Bristol
- 1986–1991: Clevedon Town
- 1991–1992: Welton Rovers
- * Club domestic league appearances and goals

David Kenneth Stone (born 29 December 1942) is an English former professional footballer, who played 154 times in The Football League for Bristol Rovers and Southend United. He also played for and managed a number of non-League clubs following the end of his professional career.

== Career ==
Stone was born in Bristol and attended Portway School in the city. He played as a child for Bristol Boys, and won the English Schools' Shield with them in 1958. He also played for Sneyd Park, before joining League side Bristol Rovers as a junior in 1959.

He graduated through the Rovers junior and youth teams, and signed his first professional contract in March 1960, but it was a further two years before he made his first team debut against Northampton Town in August 1962. He went on to make 148 appearances and score six goals for The Pirates until leaving to join Southend United on a free transfer in 1968. His time in Southend was less successful than his spell with Rovers, and although he played in their first five games of the 1968–69 season, he only made one more appearance in the remainder of the campaign.

His first managerial appointment came in December 1968, when he became player-manager of Hastings United. The job lasted for just five months however, when Stone resigned at the end of the 1968–69 season following Hastings' refusal to give him a long-term contract. He returned to his native West Country in December 1969, when he joined Glastonbury as a player, and spent three months with Minehead before joining Welton Rovers in October 1970.

After two years as a player, Welton appointed him as their player-manager, and he picked up his first trophy as a manager by winning the Premier Division of the Western League in 1973–74. He spent five years as a player with Weston-super-Mare between 1978 and 1981, the last three years of which he spent as player-manager, and in 1981 he was appointed player-manager of Portway Bristol. He twice won the Western League First Division with Portway, but both times they were denied promotion to the Premier Division due to their ground not meeting minimum requirements.

He spent five years as manager of Clevedon Town from 1986, and also returned to his former club Welton Rovers, where he managed from 1991 until 1992.

=== Honours ===
==== As a player ====
- English Schools' Shield: 1

1958

- Gloucestershire Cup: 5

1962–63, 1963–64, 1964–65, 1965–66, 1967–68

- Western League: 1

1969–70

==== As player-manager ====
- Western League Premier Division: 1

1973–74

- Western League First Division: 2

1984–85, 1985–86

== Non-footballing life ==
Stone worked in the offices of an engineering firm for 33 years until being made redundant. He later worked for the St. Monica Trust, where he worked in the finance office. In 2007, he was living in Rudgeway with his wife of over 40 years, Margaret.
