= Alan Stone =

Alan Stone may refer to:

- Alan A. Stone (1929–2022), scholar of law and psychology at Harvard, and film critic
- Alan Stone (opera director) (1929–2008), founder of the Chicago Opera Theater
- Alan Stone (wrestler) (born 1977), Mexican professional wrestler

== See also ==
- Allan Barry Stone (1932–2006), American art dealer
- Allan Stone (born 1945), Australian tennis player
- Allen Stone (born 1987), American soul singer and musician
