= Bill Stone (footballer) =

Australian rules footballer

Personal information
- Full name: William Robert Stone
- Born: 19 April 1894; Pakenham, Victoria
- Died: 15 June 1975 (aged 81); Pakenham, Victoria
- Original team: Pakenham
- Height: 183 cm (6 ft 0 in)
- Weight: 86 kg (190 lb)

Playing career^{1}
Years	Club	Games (Goals)
1915	Fitzroy	9 (3)
- ^{1} Playing statistics correct to the end of 1915.

William Robert Stone (19 April 1894 – 15 June 1975) was an Australian rules footballer who played with Fitzroy in the Victorian Football League (VFL).
