= Alfred Stone (musician) =

Alfred Stone (12 February 1840, Bristol – 3 January 1878, Stoke Bishop) was an English musician, choir-trainer, composer, and Church of England organist.

== Biography ==
Alfred Stone was educated at the Bristol city school (Queen Elizabeth's Hospital) and studied under John David Corfe, organist of Bristol Cathedral. Stone briefly worked at a soap works in Bristol and then in 1858 became a professional organist at St. Paul's Church, Clifton, and in 1862 at Arley Chapel. He was an organist and choir-trainer from 1863 to 1869 at Highbury Congregational chapel, from 1869 to 1875 at St. Paul's Church, Clifton, from 1875 to 1878 at Christ Church, Clifton Down, and from 1873 to 1878 at the Lord Mayor's chapel, St. Mark's Church, Bristol.

In 1863 he edited, with Mr. Fred Morgan, the ‘Bristol Tune Book,’ comprising 342 hymn-tunes and chants; a few were written by himself. The book at once gained popular favour, chiefly among nonconformists. In a third edition, edited by H. Elliot Button, the number of tunes reached nine hundred. The sale exceeded three-quarters of a million copies in England and colonies. No hymn-tune book except ‘Hymns Ancient and Modern’ has exercised a wider influence on congregational singing.

Stone adopted the tonic sol-fa system for teaching and held a number of tutorial appointments, including one at the Bristol Asylum for the Blind from 1876 to 1878. In 1873 the Bristol Musical Festival was established with Stone as choirmaster, secretary, and manager. He died suddenly and unexpectedly in 1878, leaving a widow and children. He was buried at Arnos Vale Cemetery.

== Selected publications ==
- The Bristol tune-book. A manual of tunes and chants, edited by Alfred Stone and others. London & New York: Novello, Ewer & Co. 1891. (first published by Novello in 1881)
