= C.J. Stone =

C. J. Stone
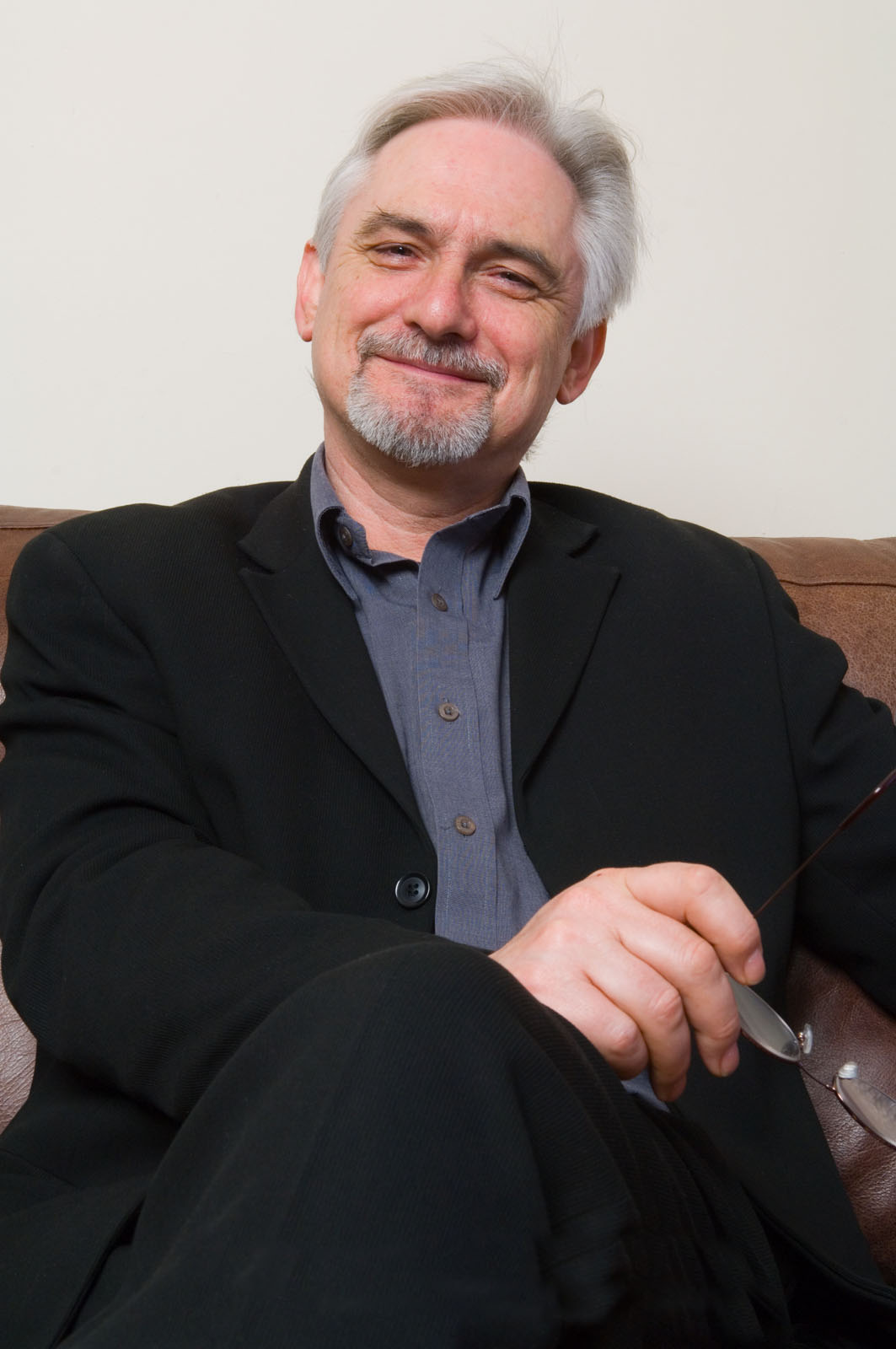
- Chris Stone in a promotional image
- Born: 16 June 1953 (age 73); Whitstable, England
- Occupations: Journalist, author, freelance writer
- Parent(s): Mary and Eddy Stone
- Website: www.CJStone.co.uk

Christopher James Stone (born 16 June 1953), pen name C. J. Stone, is an English author, journalist and freelance writer. He is best known for his columns in The Guardian Weekend and The Big Issue.

In 1971, he moved to Cardiff where he attended Cardiff University and studied English Literature, however, he dropped out after two years without completing his course. In 1981, he resumed his academic studies at Bristol Polytechnic (now the University of the West of England) where he gained a 2:1 degree in Humanities.

In 1984, he moved to Whitstable, Kent, and has been living there ever since.

== Author ==
Stone first became established as a writer when a column, written by him and entitled: "Housing Benefit Hill", was published by The Guardian Weekend in September 1993. His editor at the time was Deborah Orr. The column described life on council housing estates throughout Britain and was based around real people that he knew. The column continued for three years, until September 1996, and established him as a newspaper columnist.

Having become known for his work in The Guardian Weekend, he had his first book, Fierce Dancing, accepted for publication in 1996 by Faber & Faber. It was to define what the author became known for writing about: the counter culture of contemporary Britain and its protesters, hippies, punks, neo-pagans, ravers and New Age travellers.

== Publications ==
=== Books ===
- Fierce Dancing Adventures in the Underground (1996) published by Faber & Faber.
- Last of the Hippies (1999) published by Faber & Faber.
- Housing Benefit Hill (2001) published by AK Press – a collection of stories that had previously appeared in his column.
- The Trials of Arthur (2003) published by Element Books and co-written with Arthur Pendragon – telling the story of the life of the eco-warrior and self-proclaimed Druid king (co-author).

=== Articles ===
Stone has had regular columns in The Guardian Weekend and has contributed to The Independent, The Observer, The London Review of Books, The Times Literary Supplement, The Glasgow Herald newspapers, The Big Issue, New Statesman, Prediction, Kindred Spirit, Mixmag and Saga magazines. He currently writes for the Whitstable Gazette.

== Radio and Television ==
Stone wrote columns for a BBC Radio 4 programme called the Afternoon Shift, featuring Laurie Taylor who now runs Thinking Allowed. He was also the writer for a BBC2 TV programme called Let's Face The Music and Dance, which was aired on 15 June 1994, about the Criminal Justice and Public Order Bill.
