= Peter G. Stone =

Archaeologist and academic

Peter Stone OBE FSA
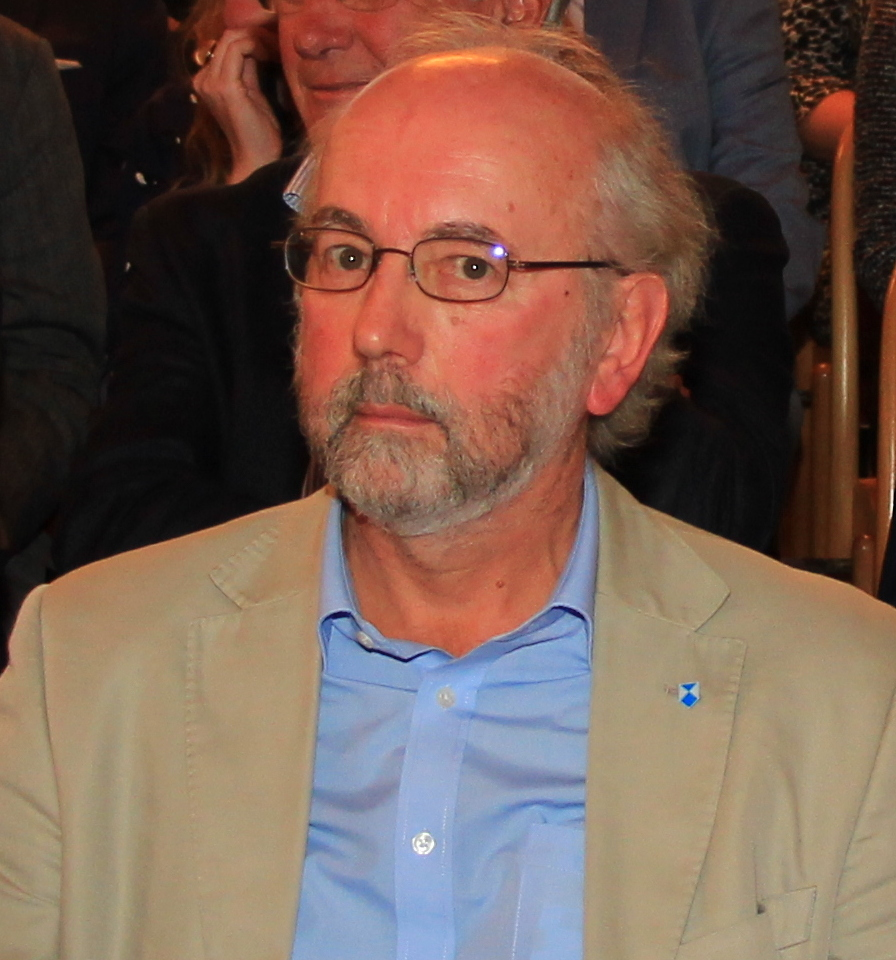
- Stone in 2017

UNESCO Chair in Cultural Property Protection and Peace at Newcastle University
- In office January 2016 – present

Vice-President of Blue Shield International
- In office 2017–present

Chair of the UK Committee of the Blue Shield
- In office 2012–present

Personal details
- Born: 1957 (age 68–69) Manchester, England
- Website: Newcastle University bio

Academic background
- Education: University of Stirling; University of Southampton
- Thesis: Teaching the Past, with Special Reference to Prehistory, in English Primary Education (1990)

Academic work
- Discipline: Archaeology and heritage studies
- Institutions: University of Southampton; English Heritage; Council for British Archaeology; Newcastle University

Peter G. Stone, OBE, FSA (born 1957) is a British heritage professional and academic, who is the current UNESCO Chair in Cultural Property Protection and Peace at Newcastle University. He was the vice-president of Blue Shield International from 2017 to 2020, and was elected its president at the 2020 General Assembly. He is also a founding member and the chair of the UK Committee of that organisation.

== Education and early career ==
Peter G. Stone was born in 1957, in Manchester, England. He gained a bachelor's degree in history from the University of Stirling, followed by a Diploma of Education in 1979. He initially worked as a teacher, teaching history in England and English in Greece.

== Career ==
During the summer school holidays of 1978, 1979 and 1980, Stone joined as a volunteer archaeological excavations in the Anglo-Scandinavian site of Coppergate in York, and in the Saxon site of Hamwic in Southampton. In 1980, he worked as a paid archaeologist at Hambledon Hill in Dorset and later in 1982 in Jewbury. After completing his master's degree (MA) in archaeological method and theory at the University of Southampton in 1983, he started carrying out his PhD research on a part-time basis. His thesis, supervised by Professor Peter Ucko, titled Teaching the Past, with Special Reference to Prehistory, in English Primary Education.

Whilst researching, Peter worked as a Project Manager and Coordinator at the University of Southampton for the Archaeology and Education Project set up with Ucko and then in various posts at English Heritage. The latter posts included his direct involvement with the controversies surrounding the Summer Solstice at Stonehenge in the 1990s. He became an expert on the World Heritage site of Stonehenge, Avebury, and Associated Sites and went on to publish widely on it In 1997, the Council for British Archaeology (CBA) appointed him as their Special Advisor on Stonehenge. From 1997 to 2003, he was also appointed the Chair of the CBA Education committee, and from the mid-80s, he was a member of their Schools Committee and Education Board. They later also appointed him CBA representative for the World Heritage site of Hadrian's Wall. Other appointments have included chairing the Hadrian's Wall World Heritage Site Management Plan Committee and sitting on the National Trust's Archaeology Advisory Panel.

He was the Executive Series Editor for the One World Archaeology (OWA) Series (1999–2003). As part of the OWA Series, he produced several publications on education and interpretation of archaeological and cultural heritage.

In 1997, Peter joined Newcastle University as a lecturer in Heritage studies at the Department of Archaeology and was promoted to Professor in 2005. He became Director of the International Centre for Cultural and Heritage Studies (ICCHS) in the School of Arts and Cultures in 2001–2005 and was Head of the School from 2006 until December 2015.

In 2016, Peter was appointed the UNESCO Chair in Cultural Property Protection and Peace, the first of its kind.

== Stone and the World Archaeological Congress ==
Together with Peter Ucko, Stone was instrumental in founding the World Archaeological Congress, established in 1986. The World Archaeological Congress (WAC) "is a not-for-profit organization and forum for discussion for anyone who is concerned with the study of the past. WAC seeks to promote interest in the past in all countries, to encourage the development of regionally based histories and to foster international academic interaction. Its aims are based on the need to make archaeological studies relevant to the wider community". He was part of the steering committee, a member of the voluntary WAC Secretariat, and from 1998, the WACs Chief Executive Officer until 2008. (The Executive is the main governing body of WAC between meetings of Council). He assisted in the organisation of the WAC congress every four years from WAC 1 to WAC 6.

== Cultural Property Protection: Iraq and beyond ==
During the Iraq War in 2003, Stone was contacted by a friend serving in the Royal Navy, working at the time in the UK Ministry of Defence. He asked Stone to provide information on the major archaeological sites that might be threatened if the discussed invasion of Iraq went ahead. Stone pointed out that he was not a Middle Eastern archaeologist and approached two other specialists. One, the most recent Director of the British school of Archaeology in Iraq, provided a list of 36 Iraqi sites, covering a range of time periods, and both stressed the likelihood of looting during the conflict. Stone sent the information and the warning to the MoD, highlighting the UKs legal obligations around cultural property protection, and continued to lobby (ultimately unsuccessfully) to brief the Ministry of Defence. Iraq's cultural heritage was heavily damaged and looted in the years following the invasion: the most famous event was the looting of the National Museum of Iraq, but many other museums and sites were heavily affected.

From this experience, he wrote extensively on the topic of cultural property protection in the event of armed conflict and the necessity of working with military forces to develop effective safeguarding measures. This led to the publication of The Destruction of Cultural Heritage in Iraq, co-edited with Joanne Farchakh Bajjaly. In addition to receiving the James R Wiseman Award of the Archaeological Institute of America, the book was highlighted as 'Book of the Week' in the Times Higher Education, where it was described as: an extraordinary achievement that will stand as the definitive account of the desperate, avoidable cultural tragedy of Iraq for many years to come. Stone also collaborated on the travelling exhibition Catastrophe! The Looting and Destruction of Iraq's Past, based on the book of the same name. The Exhibition was shown at eight UK and European venues including Newcastle upon Tyne, Durham, London, Dublin, and The Hague.

Both the invasion, and the involvement of archaeologists and heritage professionals, were highly controversial: Stone in particular was heavily criticised for his involvement with the military during the Iraq invasion. As a result of this, Stone has supported extensive research on the ethics of heritage professionals working in armed conflict, and is part of the Core Research Group for the AHRC funded Heritage in War project, which looks at cultural heritage and the ethics of war.

Stone coordinated the evidence of 13 heritage and cultural organisation, to The Iraq Inquiry (also referred to as the Chilcot Inquiry after its chairman, Sir John Chilcot), a British public inquiry into the nation's role in the Iraq War. The inquiry was announced in 2009 by Prime Minister Gordon Brown and published in 2016 with a public statement by Chilcot. The combined heritage submission addressed the problems faced by UK forces with respect to safeguarding the cultural heritage in Iraq. The contribution featured in part 6.2 of the final report "6.2 - Military planning for the invasion, January to March 2003", in the section Sites of religious and cultural significance.

Following his experiences with the cultural heritage of Iraq, Stone went on to bring the issue of cultural protection to the attention of policy makers, the general public, and numerous armed forces. He has spoken at numerous conferences, heritage, general public and military. Stone's 2013 article, A Four-Tier Approach to the Protection of Cultural Property in the Event of Armed Conflict, published in Antiquity and the British Army Review, led to the establishment of a Joint Service Cultural Property Protection Unit within UK forces., hopefully operational in 2020/2021. The Unit is led by Lt Col Tim Purbrick OBE FSA VR, who was instrumental in setting up the unit in the British Army. Stone also assisted in the drafting of the CIMIC Centre of Excellence publication Cultural Property Protection Makes Sense. Commenting on Stone's work in this area, a senior CIMIC-COE staff member stated that, "...were it not for the past work, expertise and dedication of Prof. Stone, the project would have never moved farther along than the concept....His impact on both sides of the civil-military equation, in the area of joint education and training, has been significant."

Stone's work and lobbying were also highly influential in the UK's ratification of the 1954 Hague Convention for the Protection of Cultural Property in the Event of Armed Conflict in 2017.

== The Blue Shield ==
The International Committee of the Blue Shield was founded in 1996 to respond to threats to heritage from conflict and disaster. The organisation was formed from a representative of International Council on Monuments and Sites (ICOMOS), International Council of Museums (ICOM), the International Council on Archives (ICA), and the International Federation of Library Associations and Institutions (IFLA). The organisation was hampered by lack of funding, and various countries formed national committees: in 2008, these formed the Association of National Committees of the Blue Shield. Stone became the Secretary of the ANCBS Board in March 2013. He held that position until 2017, when ICBS and ANCBS formally merged into The Blue Shield. Stone was instrumental in drafting the new statutes of the Blue Shield and was present when they were formally signed. Stone's Four-Tier Approach was formally adopted as official policy by the ANCBS Board in 2014, and remains official policy of The Blue Shield.

At the Blue Shield 2017 General Assembly, Stone was appointed the vice-president of Blue Shield International, the international co-ordination board of The Blue Shield, and at the General Assembly in August 2020, he was elected president.

In 2012, Stone founded the UK Committee of the Blue Shield. He was the chair until he stepped down following his election as president of the Blue Shield Movement in autumn 2020, but he remains an active member of the committee.

== Honours ==
He was made associate of the Institute of Field Archaeologists (AIFA) in 1986, and promoted to member (MIFA) in 1991.

In 1997, he was elected a Fellow of the Society of Antiquaries (FSA).

In 2011, his co-edited book with Joanne Farchakh Bajjaly, The Destruction of Cultural Heritage in Iraq (2008), was awarded the James R Wiseman Award by the Archaeological Institute of America.

In 2011 Queen's Birthday Honours, he was appointed Officer of the Order of the British Empire (OBE) for services to heritage education.

In 2013, Peter was awarded the Peter Ucko Memorial Award and a Lifetime Achievement Award by the World Archaeological Congress – both for services to world archaeology.
