= Mary Carter =

Mary Carter may refer to:

== People ==
- Mary Carter Reitano (born 1934), Australian tennis player
- Mary Carter Smith (1919–2007), American educator
- Laura-Mary Carter, member of the British band Blood Red Shoes
- Mary Kennedy Carter (1934–2010), social studies teacher and civil rights activist
- Mary Carter (judge) (1923–2010), Saskatchewan judge
- Mary Adaline Carter, American industrial art instructor and designer
- Mary Randolph Carter, American author, photographer, and collector
- Mary Elizabeth Carter (1852–1928), English author

== Other uses ==
- Mary Carter Warwick, birthname of Erica Lovejoy, in the US TV soap opera The Bold and the Beautiful
- Mary-Claire Carter, in the UK medical drama TV series Holby City
- "The Mary Ellen Carter", a 1979 song written and recorded by Stan Rogers
