= Jim Stone =

Jim Stone may refer to:

- Jim Stone (American football) (born 1958), American football running back
- Jim Stone (rugby union) (1921–2010), Australian rugby union player
- Jimmy Stone (1876–1942), English cricketer

== See also ==
- James Stone (disambiguation)
