= Henry H. Carse =

American politician (1918–2008)

Member of the Vermont House of Representatives from the Chittenden 8 district
- In office 1966–1987

Personal details
- Born: April 4, 1918 New York, New York, U.S.
- Died: August 14, 2008 (aged 90) Hinesburg, Vermont
- Party: Republican
- Education: Williams College; Harvard Business School

Henry H. Carse (April 4, 1918 – August 14, 2008) was an American politician. He served as a Republican member for the Chittenden 8 district of the Vermont House of Representatives from 1966 to 1987.
