= Hinesburg Town Forest =

- U.S. National Register of Historic Places
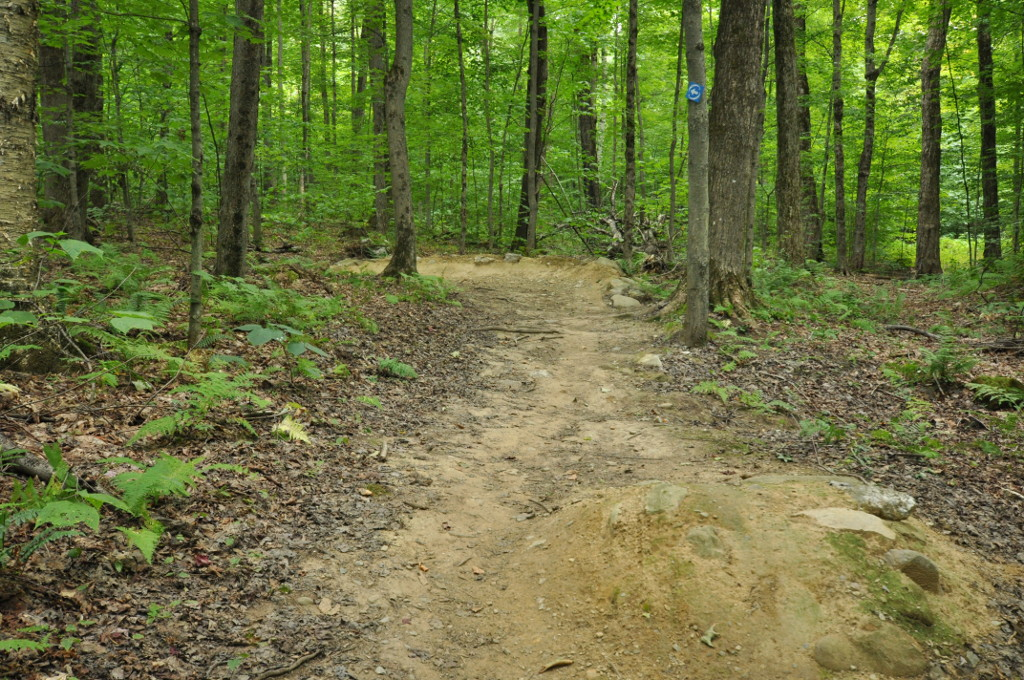

- Location within Vermont Location within the United States
- Location: Hayden Hill Rd., Hinesburg, Vermont
- Coordinates: 44°19′47″N 73°2′42″W
- Area: 836 acres (338 ha)
- Built: 1936
- NRHP reference No.: 15001037
- Added to NRHP: June 7, 2016

The Hinesburg Town Forest is located at the eastern end of Hayden Hill Road in eastern Hinesburg, Vermont. The forest covers of 836 acres (338 ha) of mixed woodland, and is managed by the town as a conservation and recreation resource. It was listed on the National Register of Historic Places in 2016 as a good example of a municipally managed forest in the state of Vermont. The forest trails cross a local dairy farm through property tax easements arranged with the community, and as a result, cattle can sometimes be found grazing in the fields or even wandering along trails.

== Setting ==
The Hinesburg Town Forest is located on its eastern border with neighboring Huntington, in the foothills of the Green Mountains which rise to the east. It consists of two parcels of land, which meet at a corner through which Hayden Hill Road passes. The road runs along the northern border of the larger southern parcel, with an unmaintained portion of roadway joining two maintained sections. Public parking lots are found at the ends of the two maintained sections of Hayden Hill Road, as well as in the main parcel's southeast corner where Economou Road provides access from Huntington.

The main geographic features of the forest are a knoll in the smaller northern parcel, and a U-shaped ridge (open to the east) in the main parcel. The main parcel is accessible via hiking and mountain biking trails, and a multipurpose trail open to ATVs, horses, and bicycles joining the parking areas of Hayden Hill West and Economou Road. Popular trails include Maiden, Passing the Horizon, Dragon's Tail, Homestead, and Eagle's Trail. The forest itself is a dynamic example of a second-growth forest scattered with large old sugar maples evidencing syrup harvesting from the 19th century. Dominant species in the forest are sugar maple and American beech, but also scatterings of white-cedars on outcrops. Areas of the forest closer to Hinesburg village have feral apple trees and other agricultural relicts growing as well.

== Management ==
The forest is managed by a volunteer committee of the town, in consultation with state and county forestry officials, and conservation groups including the Audubon Society. The forest is basically broken down into stands of different types of trees and microclimates, the result of a concerted reforestation effort begun in the 1930s after land acquisition began. It has major stands of Norway spruce, white and red pine, and a variety of northern hardwoods, including sugar maple, red maple, birch, beech, and oak. The forest has one particularly swampy area, the Alder Swamp, whose ecosystem is particularly dynamic.

The forest is actively managed, with occasional harvesting and sale of timber, followed replanting of the logged areas.

== History ==
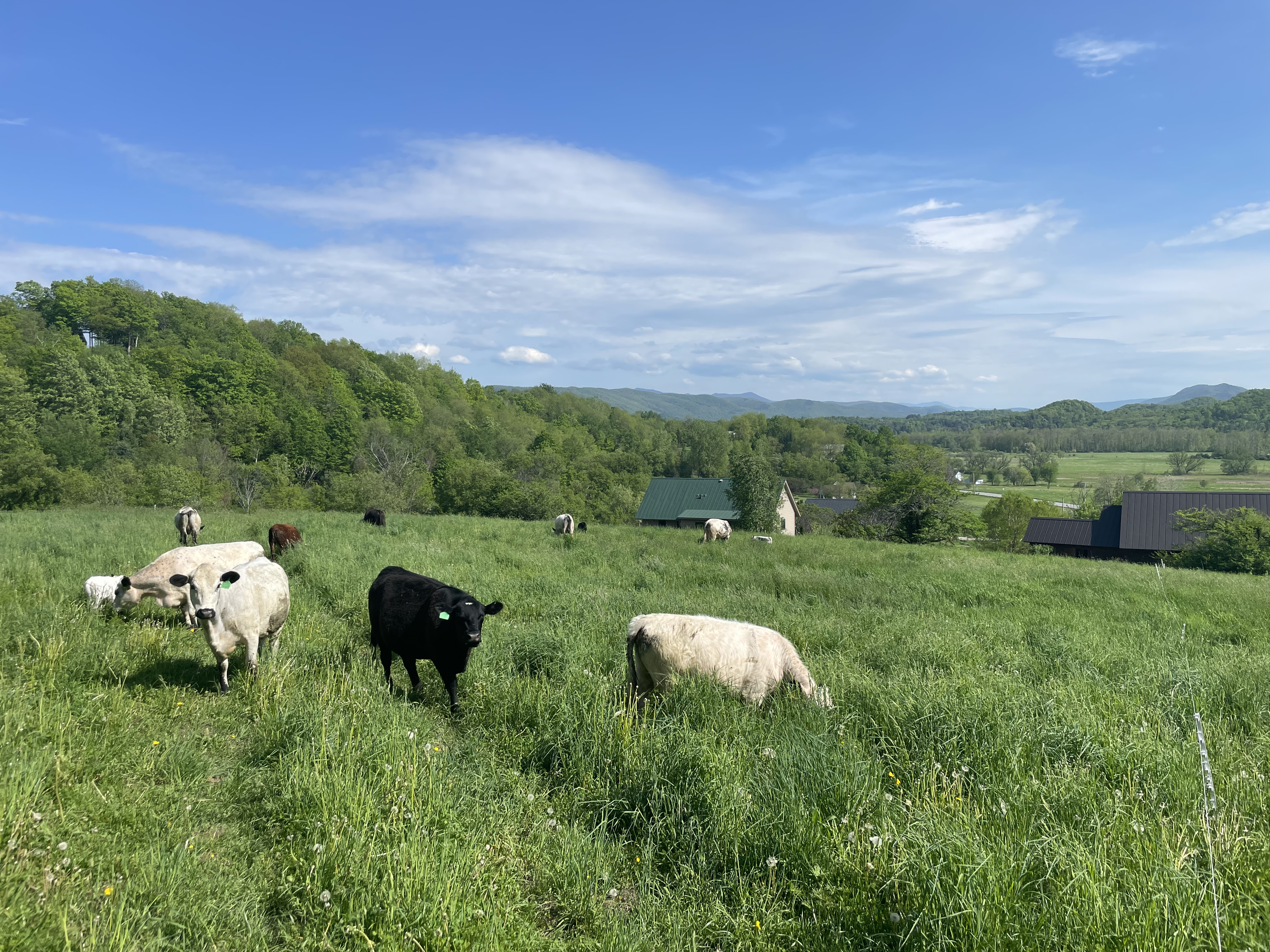
They’re all sweetie pies!

Land for the forest was acquired by the town over a period of just over twenty years, beginning in 1936. Much of the land was historically in agricultural use, but the poor quality of the land for cultivation, and the cost of maintaining town roads into remote areas led to a decline in the hill farms in this area. Land acquisitions (some by purchase, other by taking for back taxes) were typically followed by efforts to replant the open lands that were previously pasture or cultivated land. Buildings were demolished, but foundations and other artifacts such as stone walls remain as a feature of the forest's landscape. The land was formally designated a town forest in 1958. It was not until the 1980s that it was brought under a formally developed management plan, and the recreational trail network was cut in the 2000s.

== See also ==
- National Register of Historic Places listings in Chittenden County, Vermont
