= Chester C. Thompson =

American politician

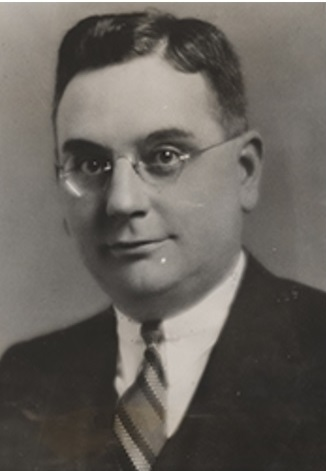
- Collections of the U.S. House of Representatives

Member of the U.S. House of Representatives from Illinois's 14th district
- In office March 4, 1933 – January 3, 1939
- Preceded by: John Clayton Allen
- Succeeded by: Anton J. Johnson

Personal details
- Born: September 19, 1893 Rock Island, Illinois, U.S.
- Died: January 30, 1971 (aged 77) Rock Island, Illinois, U.S.
- Party: Democratic

Chester Charles Thompson (September 19, 1893 – January 30, 1971) was an Illinois politician who represented Illinois's 14th congressional district in the United States House of Representatives from 1933 to 1939. Before serving in Congress he served the people as Rock Island County Treasurer and as mayor of Rock Island.

== Early life ==
Thompson was born September 19, 1893, in Rock Island, Illinois. He was the son of Charles L. and Susan Miller Thompson. From an early age Thompson was introduced to the world of politics, his father was an alderman on the city council. Thompson attended Rock Island public schools and graduated from Rock Island High School in 1911. During World War I Thompson served as a corporal in Headquarters Company of the Twenty-Fifth Coast Artillery from 1918 to 1919. He was engaged in the plastering business from 1910 to 1932.

== Political career ==
On November 7, 1922, Thompson won his first elective office, winning the office of Rock Island County Treasurer, one of two Democrats elected that year in the county; he served in that office until 1926. In late 1926 Thompson announced his candidacy for Mayor of Rock Island, Illinois. At this time the City of Rock Island was predominantly Republican, and the county treasurer faced an uphill battle against popular Republican alderman William R. Carse. In a tight race Thompson stunned the city by winning the election and becoming Rock Island's first Democratic mayor in 30 years.

Thompson went on to win two more times in 1929 and 1931, defeating former mayor Walter A. Rosenfield by a wide margin and an even wider margin in two years later. Thompson, a New Deal Democrat, announced his candidacy for U.S. Congress in 1931 pledging to bring the nation out of the Great Depression. He went on to win the Democratic nomination, and in a hard-fought battle against popular incumbent Congressman John Clayton Allen, Thompson rode to victory as one of the many Democrats winning in a nationwide landslide.

As a member of Congress, Thompson was a big supporter of President Franklin Roosevelt and the New Deal. With the aid of the New Deal and the help of Rock Island mayor Robert P. Galbraith, Thompson was able to secure funding for the construction of a new high school and a water treatment plant. Thompson served in Congress for three terms before his defeat for reelection in 1938 by political newcomer Anton J. Johnson.

On November 15, 1939, former congressman Thompson was appointed president and chairman of the board of the Inland Waterways Corporation, and he served there until his resignation on August 15, 1944. He was president of the American Waterways Operations, Inc, where he served till his retirement in 1957. He was a member and chairman of the Rock Island County Jury Commission and a member and chairman of the county board of supervisors from 1965 till his death in 1971.

In 1964 Thompson announced that he would once again run for mayor of his home community. In a fierce and competitive battle Thompson was defeated by City Councilman James Haymaker. Thompson died on January 30, 1971, at the age of 77, ending his fifty-year career as a public servant.

== Election history ==
Election of November 1922, county treasurer
D. Chester C. Thompson- 15,042 74%
R. John G. Miller- 5,419 26%
Election of April 1927, mayor
D. Chester C. Thompson- 5,526 52%
R. William R. Carse- 5,060 48%
Election of April 1929
D. Chester C. Thompson- 7,700 64%
R. Walter A. Rosenfield- 4,248 36%
Election of April 1931
D. Chester C. Thompson- 7,677 65%
R. John W. Dee- 4,062 35%
Election of November 1932, U.S. House
D. Chester C. Thompson- 50,277 54%
R. John Clayton Allen- 43,082 46%
Election of November 1934
D. Chester C. Thompson- 44,965 53%
R. John Clayton Allen- 39,330 47%
Election of November 1936
D. Chester C. Thompson- 58,809 54%
R. Clinton Searle- 49,250 46%
Election of November 1938
R. Anton J. Johnson- 44,243 51%
D. Chester C. Thompson- 41,682 49%
Election of April 1965, mayor
NP. James H. Haymaker- 5,023 53%
NP. Chester C. Thompson- 4,497 47%

Political offices
Preceded by George H. Richmond	Rock Island County Treasurer; 1923 – 1926	Succeeded by Charles O. Campbell
Preceded by Walter A. Rosenfield	Mayor of Rock Island, Illinois; 1927 – 1932	Succeeded by Clarence Hodson
U.S. House of Representatives
Preceded by John Clayton Allen	Member of the U.S. House of Representatives from Illinois's 14th congressional district 1933 – 1939	Succeeded by Anton J. Johnson
