= Cicero Goddard Peck House =

Historic house in Vermont, United States

- U.S. National Register of Historic Places
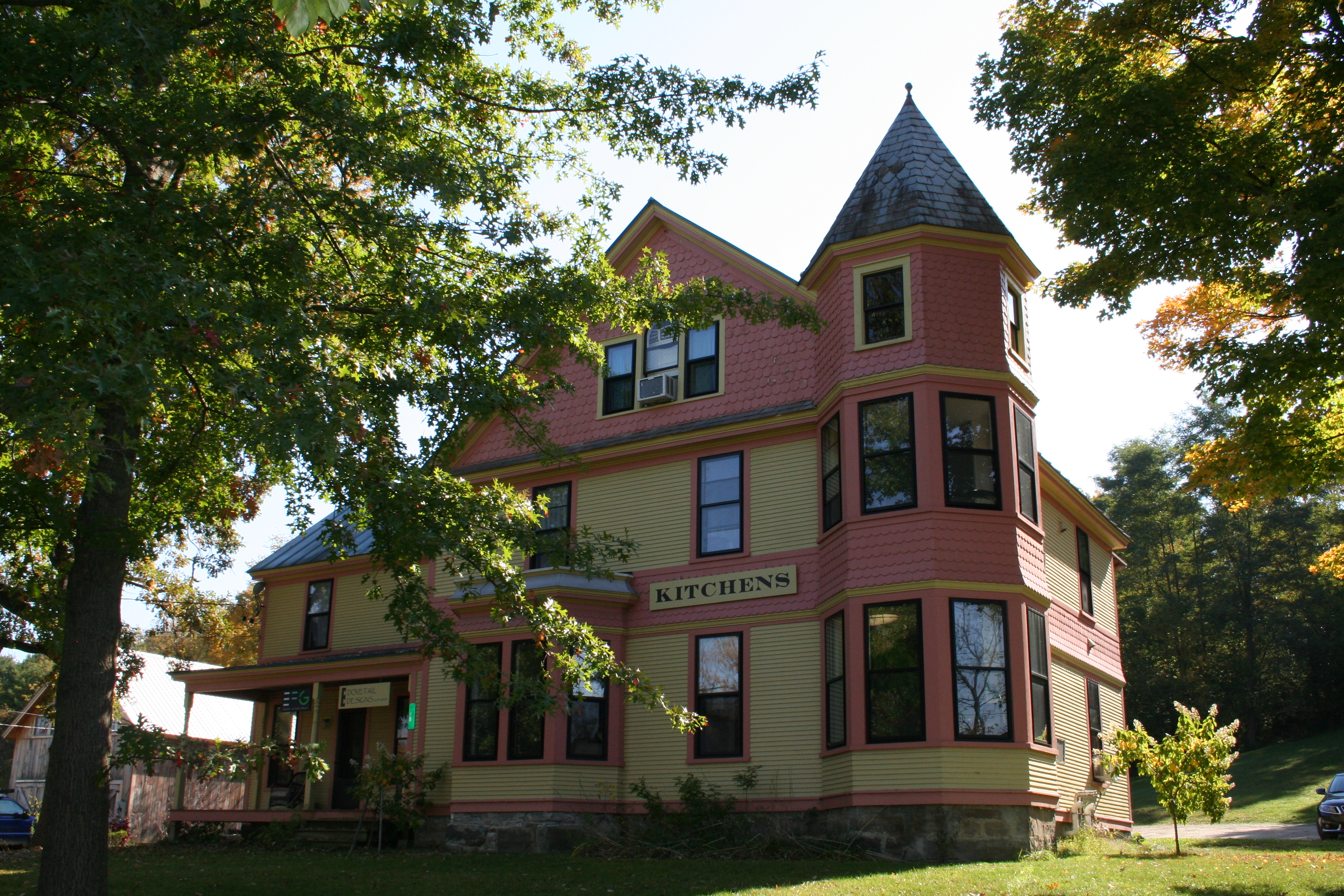

- Location within Vermont Location within the United States
- Location: 18 Mechanicsville Rd., Hinesburg, Vermont
- Coordinates: 44°19′55″N 73°6′36″W
- Area: 1.2 acres (0.49 ha)
- Built: 1896
- Architectural style: Queen Anne
- NRHP reference No.: 10000890
- Added to NRHP: November 10, 2010

The Cicero Goddard Peck House is a historic house at 18 Mechanicsville Road in Hinesburg, Vermont. Built in 1896 by a prominent town benefactor, it is a well-preserved example of Queen Anne Victorian architecture. It was listed on the National Register of Historic Places in 2010.

== Description and history ==
The Cicero Goddard Peck House stands in the village Hinesburg, on the south side of Mechanicsville Road just east of its junction with Vermont Route 116. It is a 2 1/2-story wood-frame structure, basically L-shaped, with a main block whose gable is perpendicular to the road, and a side ell with a cross gable. A single-story porch is set at the crook of the ell, and a polygonal three-story tower projects from the front right corner. The exterior is finished in a combination of wooden clapboards and scallop-cut shingles, and there is a projecting single-story polygonal bay on the front facade. The porch is supported by turned posts and has a balustrade with square balusters. The interior of the house retains many original period finishes and features, including pocket doors, a China cabinet in the dining room, and original moulding and floors.

The house was built in 1896 for Cicero Goddard Peck. The Peck family was locally prominent: Peck's uncle Asahel served as Governor of Vermont, and his father Nahum was a lawyer who also served in the state legislature. Peck himself was a prominent local dairy farmer, who helped organize a local cooperative and served in town offices. He bequested to the town an endowment known as the Peck Estate, whose proceeds support the town's schools.

== See also ==
- National Register of Historic Places listings in Chittenden County, Vermont
