= Consortium of Liberal Arts Colleges =

Nonprofit organization of American liberal arts colleges

The Consortium of Liberal Arts Colleges (CLAC) is a nonprofit organization of 75 American liberal arts colleges which formed in 1984 under the leadership of Oberlin College's president S. Frederick Starr. CLAC brings together the IT professionals from its member colleges and universities to help those institutions make the best use of technology to enrich students’ learning, facilitate teaching and research, and to support the business of the higher education. CLAC has been supporting collaboration, knowledge sharing, professional growth of its IT members, and advocacy for the liberal arts at the national level for more three decades.

The organization celebrated its 20th Annual Conference in 2018.

== Members ==
Northeast

- Allegheny College
- Amherst College
- Barnard College
- Bates College
- Bowdoin College
- Bryn Mawr College
- Bucknell University
- Colby College
- Colgate University
- College of the Holy Cross
- Connecticut College
- Dickinson College
- Franklin and Marshall College
- Gettysburg College
- Hamilton College
- Haverford College
- Hobart and William Smith Colleges
- Lafayette College
- Manhattan University
- Middlebury College
- Mount Holyoke College
- Saint Michael's College
- Skidmore College
- Smith College
- St. Lawrence University
- Swarthmore College
- Trinity College
- Union College
- Ursinus College
- Vassar College
- Wellesley College
- Wesleyan University
- Wheaton College (Massachusetts)
- Williams College
- Washington College

Midwest

- Albion College
- Alma College
- Beloit College
- Carleton College
- College of Saint Benedict and Saint John's University
- College of Wooster
- Colorado College
- Denison University
- DePauw University
- Earlham College
- Grinnell College
- Hope College
- Kalamazoo College
- Kenyon College
- Lake Forest College
- Lawrence University
- Luther College
- Macalester College
- Oberlin College
- Ohio Wesleyan University
- St. Olaf College
- Wabash College
- Wheaton College (Illinois)

South

- Berea College
- Davidson College
- Furman University
- Morehouse College
- Rhodes College
- Rollins College
- Sewanee: The University of the South
- Southwestern University
- Spelman College
- Trinity University
- Washington and Lee University
- Wofford College

West

- Claremont McKenna College
- Harvey Mudd College
- Occidental College
- Pitzer College
- Pomona College
- Reed College
- Scripps College
- Whitman College
- Whittier College
