= John Clayton Allen =

American politician (1860–1939)

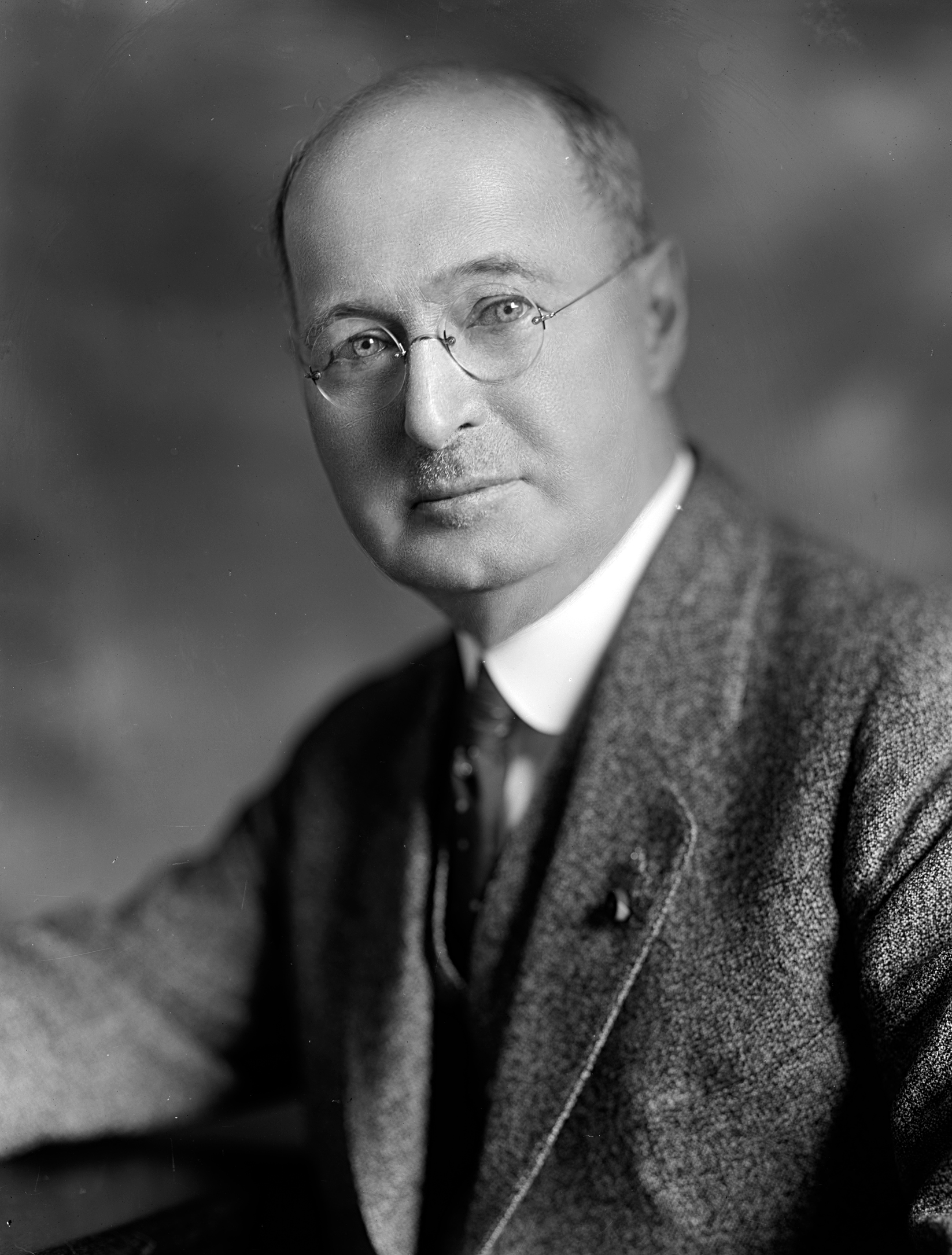

Member of the U.S. House of Representatives from Illinois's 14th district
- In office March 4, 1925 – March 3, 1933
- Preceded by: William J. Graham
- Succeeded by: Chester C. Thompson

Personal details
- Born: February 14, 1860 Hinesburg, Vermont, U.S.
- Died: January 12, 1939 (aged 78) Monmouth, Illinois, U.S.
- Party: Republican

John Clayton Allen (February 14, 1860 – January 12, 1939) was an American politician who represented Illinois in the United States House of Representatives from 1925 to 1933.

== Early life and education ==
Allen was born in Hinesburg, Vermont, in 1860, the son of John H. Allen and Elizabeth Burns Allen. He attended the common schools and Beeman Academy, New Haven, Vermont. Allen's father served as a first lieutenant in the 14th Vermont Infantry of the Union Army during the American Civil War.

== Career ==
Allen moved to Lincoln, Nebraska, in 1881, and to McCook, Nebraska, in 1886. He engaged in mercantile pursuits at both places. He was a member of the McCook City Council 1887-1889; mayor of McCook, Nebraska in 1890; and Secretary of State of Nebraska 1891-1895.

Allen moved to Monmouth, Illinois, in 1896 and became president of the John C. Allen Co. department store and of the People's National Bank of Monmouth. He served as member of the State normal school board from 1917 to 1927 and was elected as a Republican to the Sixty-ninth and to the three succeeding Congresses, from March 4, 1925 to March 3, 1933. He was an unsuccessful candidate for reelection in 1932 to the Seventy-third Congress and for election in 1934 to the Seventy-fourth Congress. After leaving Congress, he resumed his former business pursuits in Monmouth, Illinois.

== Personal life ==
Allen married Abbie Stapleford in 1881; they had a son, Ralph, and she died in 1899. He remarried, to Dora Durell, in 1902; they had two more sons, John and Theodore. Allen died in Monmouth, Illinois, in 1939. He was buried in Vermont Cemetery, Vermont, Illinois. His grandson Johnny Allen was a professional American football player, with the Washington Redskins from 1955 to 1958. Another grandson and namesake, John Clayton Allen III, was a child actor and a federal official in the Department of Health and Human Services.

On April 7, 1904, Allen was elected as a 2nd Class Companion of the Illinois Commandery of the Military Order of the Loyal Legion of the United States (MOLLUS) by right of his father's service in the Civil War. He became a Companion of the 1st Class upon the death of his father. He was assigned MOLLUS insignia number 14,225.

U.S. House of Representatives
Preceded by William J. Graham	Member of the U.S. House of Representatives from Illinois's 14th congressional district 1925–1933	Succeeded by Chester C. Thompson
