= James F. Jones (educator) =

American college administrator (born 1947)

President of Sweet Briar College
- Interim
- In office August 1, 2014 – July 2, 2015
- Preceded by: Jo Ellen Parker
- Succeeded by: Phillip C. Stone

21st President of Trinity College
- In office July 1, 2004 – June 30, 2014
- Preceded by: Borden W. Painter Jr.
- Succeeded by: Joanne Berger-Sweeney

16th President of Kalamazoo College
- In office 1996–2004
- Preceded by: Lawrence D. Bryan
- Succeeded by: Eileen Wilson-Oyelaran

Personal details
- Born: 1947 (age 77–78) Atlanta, Georgia, U.S.
- Spouse: Joan Sheets
- Children: 3
- Education: University of Virginia (BA); Emory University (MA); Columbia University (MPhil, PhD)

James F. Jones Jr. (born April 9, 1947) is an American academic administrator and educator. He began his career as a professor of Romance languages and other humanities. His administrative posts have included being vice provost of Southern Methodist University and dean of its Dedman College of Humanities and Sciences; president of Kalamazoo College; president of Trinity College in Hartford, Connecticut; and interim president of Sweet Briar College.

== Early life and education ==
Jones was born in Atlanta, Georgia in 1947. He graduated from the Georgia Military Academy in 1965. He received degrees from the University of Virginia, Emory University, the Sorbonne, and Columbia University. While at the University of Virginia, he was assistant director of the Virginia Glee Club.

== Career ==
=== Early career ===
Jones was professor and department chair of Romance languages and literature at Washington University in St. Louis and he was also director of the university's summer language institute in France. He later served as preceptor for the department of French and Romance Philology at Columbia University.

In the early 1990s, he was vice provost of Southern Methodist University in Dallas, Texas and dean of its Dedman School of Humanities and Sciences, and he was also a professor of humanities there.

=== Kalamazoo College ===
Jones was president of Kalamazoo College from 1996 to 2004, and he taught humanities there as well. He nearly doubled the college's endowment, and supported study-abroad and internship programs.

=== Trinity College ===
Jones assumed the role of president of Trinity College in Hartford, Connecticut on July 1, 2004.

In 2007 he signed the Annapolis Group Presidents Letter, refusing to participate in or provide information to U.S. News & World Report or other college ranking organizations.

In 2009, Jones faced criticism for allegedly raiding Trinity's Shelby Cullom Davis endowment and using funds in contravention of the wishes of the original donor. The college petitioned the Attorney General's office to broaden the use of funds from the Davis Endowment to include student scholarships in Economics. Professor Gerald Gunderson, the Shelby Cullom Davis Professor of American Business and Economic Enterprise at Trinity College filed a complaint with the Connecticut Attorney General's office and a review revealed that the college had for some years been drawing on the Davis endowment without approval. The college agreed to adhere to the original conditions of the endowment in late 2013, when Prof. Gunderson objected to excess funds being used for student scholarships and commenced litigation. Details of the situation are reviewed in "Another Cautionary Tale: The Shelby Cullom Davis Professorship of American Business and Economic Enterprise at Trinity College" in The Intelligent Donor's Guide to College Giving and in "Games Universities Play: And How Donors Can Avoid Them". Commenting on the case, the donor's daughter, Diana Cullom Davis Spencer, noted: "If colleges like Trinity undermine donors' confidence that they will respect their wishes, they place at risk the generous support they receive from our foundation and so many others—and the benefits that inure to millions of students from this largesse."

In the fall of 2012 he attempted to overhaul Trinity College's 160-year-old Greek system by, among other things, requiring all sororities and fraternities to become 50/50 male/female by 2016 or risk having their properties confiscated by the school and their members expelled. The plan received significant criticism; fraternity and sorority members said that going coed would effectively shut them down, some alumni threatened to withhold donations, and some alumni called for Jones' resignation.

Following the controversy over the sorority and fraternity plans, in 2013 he was asked to retire a year early, and he stepped down on June 30, 2014.

=== Sweet Briar College ===
He served as interim president of Sweet Briar College in Sweet Briar, Virginia beginning in August 2014.

On March 3, 2015, Jones surprised students, faculty and alumnae by announcing that the 114-year-old institution would close permanently in August 2015. He stated that the Board of Directors had come to two conclusions after deliberation: "The declining number of students choosing to attend small, rural, private liberal arts colleges and even fewer young women willing to consider a single-sex education," and "the increase in the tuition discount rate that we have to extend to enroll each new class is financially unsustainable."

Critics of the announcement questioned Jones' claim that "to save Sweet Briar we would need $250 million into the permanent endowment tomorrow morning", pointing out that while the college had been running a deficit, it still had an endowment of $84 million and assets of $163.9 million, and that $250 million was the size of the endowment of the much larger University of Maryland. On March 30, 2015, the Amherst County attorney filed a lawsuit against Jones, alleging that the administration had continued to collect charitable donations towards its educational mission as it prepared to close, in violation of the intentions of the donors, and that it had violated Virginia's Uniform Trust Code by acting against the will of its founding documents.

A vote of no confidence in Jones and the board of directors was issued at a faculty meeting and on April 24, 2015, the faculty of Sweet Briar College filed a lawsuit seeking more than $40 million in damages. The faculty case asserted that the college was not in dire financial distress, stating that, in the previous five years, net assets had risen from $126 million to $135 million, the endowment had grown from $85 million to $95 million, and debt had dropped from $42 million to $25 million.

Following a legal battle over the attempted closure of Sweet Briar, a mediation agreement to keep the college open required Jones to resign as Sweet Briar College president seven business days after the court approved that agreement. Jones stepped down on July 2, 2015.
