= Joanne Berger-Sweeney =

American neuroscientist and college administrator

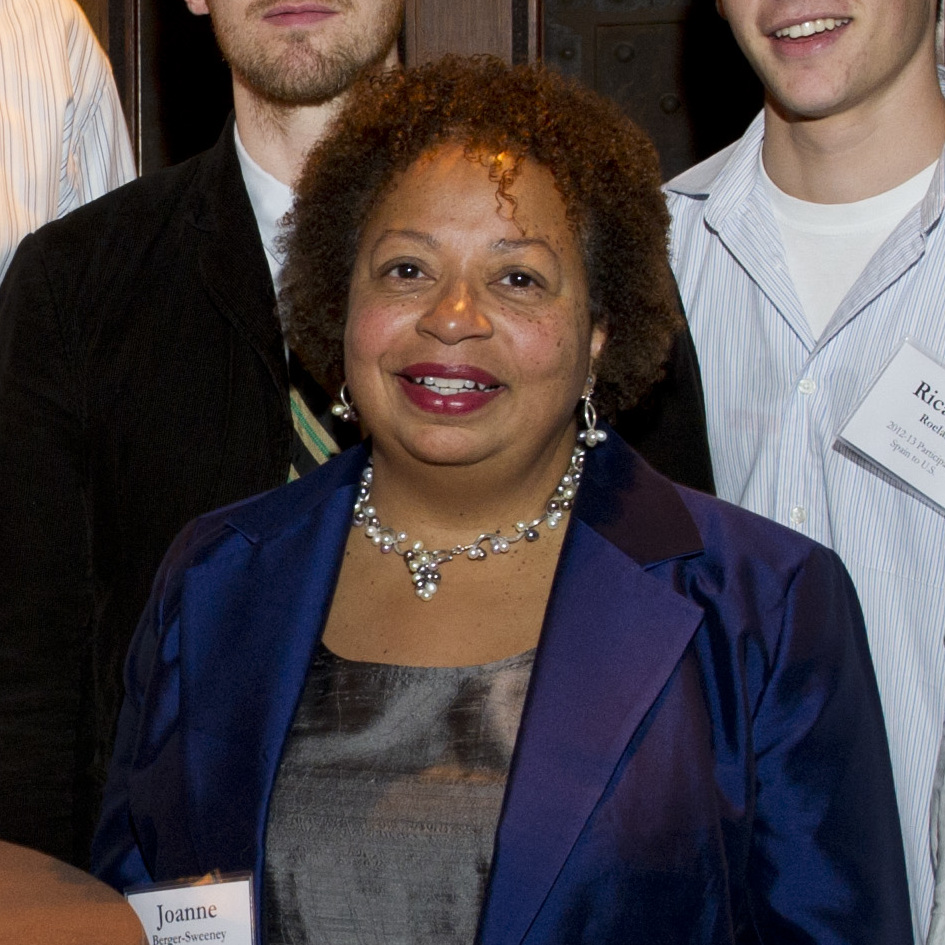
- Berger-Sweeney in 2012

22nd President of Trinity College
- Incumbent
- Assumed office October 26, 2014
- Preceded by: James F. Jones Jr.

Personal details
- Born: Joanne Sweeney; September 21, 1958 (age 68) Los Angeles, California, U.S.
- Education: Wellesley College (BA); University of California, Berkeley (MPH); Johns Hopkins University (PhD)
- Scientific career
- Known for: Galantamine proof of concept
- Spouse: Urs Berger
- Children: 2
- Fields: Neuroscience
- Workplaces: Trinity College (Connecticut)
- Doctoral advisor: Joseph T. Coyle; Yvon Lamour
- Doctoral students: Elizabeth A. Buffalo

Signature
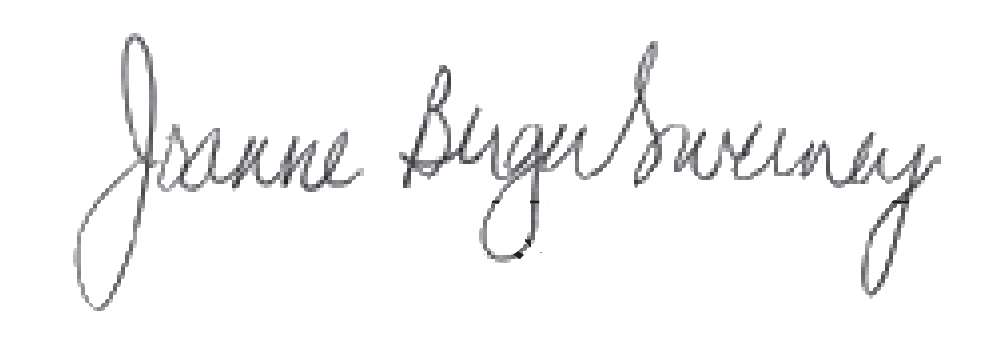

Joanne E. Berger-Sweeney (born September 21, 1958) is an American neuroscientist and the 22nd president of Trinity College, Hartford, Connecticut. She is the first African-American and the first woman to serve in the position. Earlier in her career, Berger-Sweeney did proof-of-concept work on galantamine (brand name Razadyne), the second-most used drug to treat Alzheimer's disease.

== Early life and education ==
Berger-Sweeney was born on September 21, 1958, in Los Angeles. Her parents met at Clark College. Her father earned his law degree at Howard University, finishing second in his class. Her mother was executive director of the Los Angeles Girl Scouts Council and was the first African-American woman to lead a Girl Scouts Council in a major metropolitan area.

Berger-Sweeney attended Holman United Methodist Church in Los Angeles. Later in life, at her first commencement ceremony at Trinity College, Berger-Sweeney asked civil rights leader and former Holman UMC pastor Rev. James Morris Lawson Jr. to speak.

Berger-Sweeney attended Wellesley College, where she earned an undergraduate degree in psychobiology (neuroscience) in 1979. She received a Masters of Public Health from the University of California, Berkeley in 1981. Berger-Sweeney completed her doctoral work in neurotoxicology with Joseph T. Coyle at Johns Hopkins Bloomberg School of Public Health in 1989. Berger-Sweeney did proof-of-concept work on galantamine (brand name Razadyne), showing that the drug reversed memory deficits in mice. Her work served as the foundation for clinical trials by Janssen Pharmaceutica, culminating in the drug's approval by the FDA. Galantamine is the second-most-used Alzheimer's drug in the world.

Berger-Sweeney received her PhD in 1989. She completed her postdoctoral training at the National Institute of Health (Inserm) in Paris, France.

== Career ==
Berger-Sweeney returned to Wellesley in 1991 to teach and conduct research. She was the first African-American woman at Wellesley to become a full professor and was named the Allene Lummis Russell Professor in Neuroscience. During her tenure at Wellesley, she served as director of the neuroscience program and as associate dean of the college.

In 2010, Berger-Sweeney became Dean of the School of Arts and Sciences at Tufts University, where she served until 2014, during which time she strengthened the school's faculty and interdisciplinary programs. She helped create the Center for Race and Democracy at Tufts, which studies the impact of race on individuals' lives. She also led the creation of the Bridge to Liberal Arts Success at Tufts (BLAST) program that supports college students from underserved high schools.

On October 26, 2014, she became the first woman and the first African American to lead Trinity College (Connecticut). In 2018, the college renewed her contract through 2024. Berger-Sweeney has overseen several important initiatives at Trinity, including a new strategic plan that will guide the college through 2023; a new mentoring program for incoming students (the Bantam Network); a new campus initiative to promote respect and inclusion; and an expansion into downtown Hartford.

On April 15, 2024, in an email to the Trinity community, Berger-Sweeney announced her intention to retire from Trinity College after the 2024–25 academic year.

=== Controversies ===
During her tenure at Trinity College, Berger-Sweeney was involved in several controversies that garnered national media attention.

==== Johnny Eric Williams ====
In April 2019, professor of sociology Johnny Eric Williams tweeted "whiteness is terrorism," drawing criticism from alumni and others. Berger-Sweeney released statements affirming Trinity College's support for "academic freedom and free expression and inquiry."

The same professor had been suspended in 2017 after he used "#LetThemFuckingDie" on a Facebook post. Conservative media argued that the hashtag was in response to a post about the Republican Congressional baseball practice shooting, in which Steve Scalise was shot. Williams stated that the posts were not a call for violence against white people.

In responses to threats after the 2017 incident, Berger-Sweeney shut down campus and initiated an investigation of Williams. Prior to the campus shutdown, Berger-Sweeney wrote in an email to campus that a "call to show indifference to the lives of bigots" when their lives are endangered is "reprehensible, and any such suggestion is abhorrent." Although Williams was suspended, he was eventually cleared in an investigation that concluded conservative media misinterpreted his posts.

==== Churchill Club ====
Trinity students confronted Berger-Sweeney at a midday event on May 2, 2019, over the decision to approve the Churchill Club, a conservative student organization. Gregory B. Smith, professor of political science, had founded the club at Trinity College. The Churchill Club describes itself as being "dedicated to the preservation, dissemination and extension of the Western moral and philosophical tradition." Smith called African-American, Asian-American, Latino, Muslim and Jewish culture houses on campus “tribal enclaves,” which drew criticism.

Over two dozen students handed Berger-Sweeney a letter of demands, including that she reverse the club's approval, denounce white supremacy, and change the club approval process. In a written statement, Berger-Sweeney affirmed Trinity College's commitment to academic freedom. Her statement read, in part: "We have an unshakable commitment to free expression and inquiry, open debate and discourse, and the valuing of all voices."

=== Other leadership positions ===
Berger-Sweeney serves as a Director at Hartford Hospital, Inc and Hartford HealthCare Corporation. She chairs the professional development committee of the Society for Neuroscience, is on the board of directors for the AFS Intercultural Programs/USA, and is a Trustee and chair of the Academic Affairs Committee for Framingham State University. She is also a member of the board of trustees of Cold Spring Harbor Laboratory.

== Research ==
Berger-Sweeney has received grants from the National Institutes of Health and the National Science Foundation, as well as from private foundations, for her work on the neurobiology of learning and memory, with applications to neurodevelopmental disorders. She has authored or co-authored more than 60 scientific articles.

== Awards and honors ==
Berger-Sweeney has received a number of awards for her scientific work, including the following:

- Member, Sigma Xi (1992)
- Young Investigator Award, National Science Foundation (1994)
- Member, The Dana Alliance for Brain Initiatives
- Lifetime Mentoring Award, Society for Neuroscience (2006)
- Fellow, American Association for the Advancement of Science (2012)
- Distinguished Alumna Award, Johns Hopkins School of Public Health (2015)
- Member, American Academy of Arts and Sciences (2018)

== Personal life ==
Berger-Sweeney's husband, Urs V. Berger, is a neuroscientist and computer scientist. They have two children.

== Selected works ==
- Schaevitz L, Berger-Sweeney J, Ricceri L (2014). "One-carbon metabolism in neurodevelopmental disorders: using broad-based nutraceutics to treat cognitive deficits in complex spectrum disorders". Neurosci Biobehav Rev. 46 (2): 270–84. doi:10.1016/j.neubiorev.2014.04.007. PMID 24769289.
- Schaevitz LR, Berger-Sweeney JE (2012). "Gene-environment interactions and epigenetic pathways in autism: the importance of one-carbon metabolism". ILAR J. 53: 322–40. doi:10.1093/ilar.53.3-4.322. PMID 23744970.
- Berger-Sweeney J (2011). "Cognitive deficits in Rett syndrome: what we know and what we need to know to treat them". Neurobiology of Learning and Memory. 96: 637–46.
- Ward BC, Kolodny NH, Nag N, Berger-Sweeney JE (2009). "Neurochemical changes in a mouse model of Rett syndrome: changes over time and in response to perinatal choline nutritional supplementation". J Neurochem. 108: 361–71. doi:10.1111/j.1471-4159.2008.05768.x. PMID 19012748.
- Nag N, Mellott TJ, Berger-Sweeney JE (2008). "Effects of postnatal dietary choline supplementation on motor regional brain volume and growth factor expression in a mouse model of Rett syndrome". Brain Res. 1237: 101–9. doi:10.1016/j.brainres.2008.08.042. PMID 18778693.

Academic offices
Preceded by James F. Jones	22nd President of the Trinity College; 2014–present	Succeeded by Incumbent
