= Kalamazoo College =

Private liberal arts college in Michigan, US

- Seal of Kalamazoo College
- Former names: Michigan and Huron Institute (1833–1837); Kalamazoo Literary Institute (1837–1840, 1850–1855); Kalamazoo Branch of the University of Michigan (1838–1850)
- Motto: Lux Esto (Latin)
- Motto in English: Be Light
- Type: Private liberal arts college
- Established: April 22, 1833; 193 years ago
- Religious affiliation: Not affiliated Baptist (historical)
- Academic affiliations: GLCA; CIC; Annapolis Group; Oberlin Group; CLAC
- Endowment: $320.6 million (2025)
- President: Karlyn Crowley
- Provost: Danette Ifert Johnson
- Faculty: 103
- Undergraduates: 1,436
- Location: Kalamazoo, Michigan, U.S. 42.290°N 85.601°W
- Campus: 60 acres (24 ha); Urban
- Colors: Orange & black
- Nickname: Hornets
- Sporting affiliations: NCAA Division III – MIAA
- Mascot: Buzz
- Website: kzoo.edu
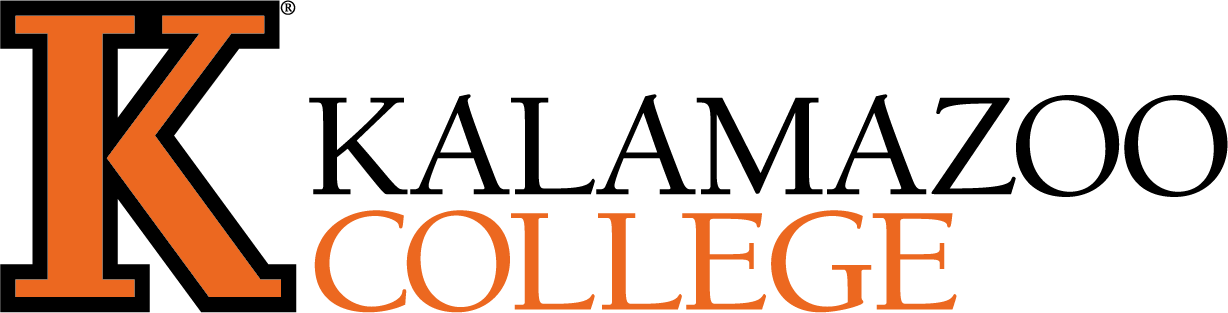

Kalamazoo College is a private liberal arts college in Kalamazoo, Michigan, United States. Founded in 1833 by Baptist ministers as the Michigan and Huron Institute, Kalamazoo is the oldest private college in Michigan. From 1840 to 1850, the institute operated as the Kalamazoo Branch of the University of Michigan. After receiving its charter from the state in 1855, the institute changed its name to Kalamazoo College.

Kalamazoo is a member of the Consortium of Liberal Arts Colleges (CLAC) and the Great Lakes Colleges Association. The college's sports teams are nicknamed the Hornets and compete in the NCAA Division III Michigan Intercollegiate Athletic Association.

== History ==
Kalamazoo College was founded in 1833 by a group of Baptist ministers as the Michigan and Huron Institute. Its charter was granted on April 22, 1833, the first school chartered by the Legislative Council of the Territory of Michigan. Instruction at the Institute began in fall 1836. In 1837, the name of the fledgling college was changed to the Kalamazoo Literary Institute and school officials made their first attempt to secure recognition as a college from the state of Michigan. In 1838, however, the University of Michigan opened the Kalamazoo Branch of the University of Michigan, providing a local competitor to the Literary Institute. In 1840, the two schools merged, and from 1840 to 1850, the college operated as the Kalamazoo Branch of the University of Michigan. In 1850, the Kalamazoo Literary Institute name was restored and in 1855 the school finally received an educational charter from the State of Michigan; it was now officially a college. The school changed its name to Kalamazoo College.

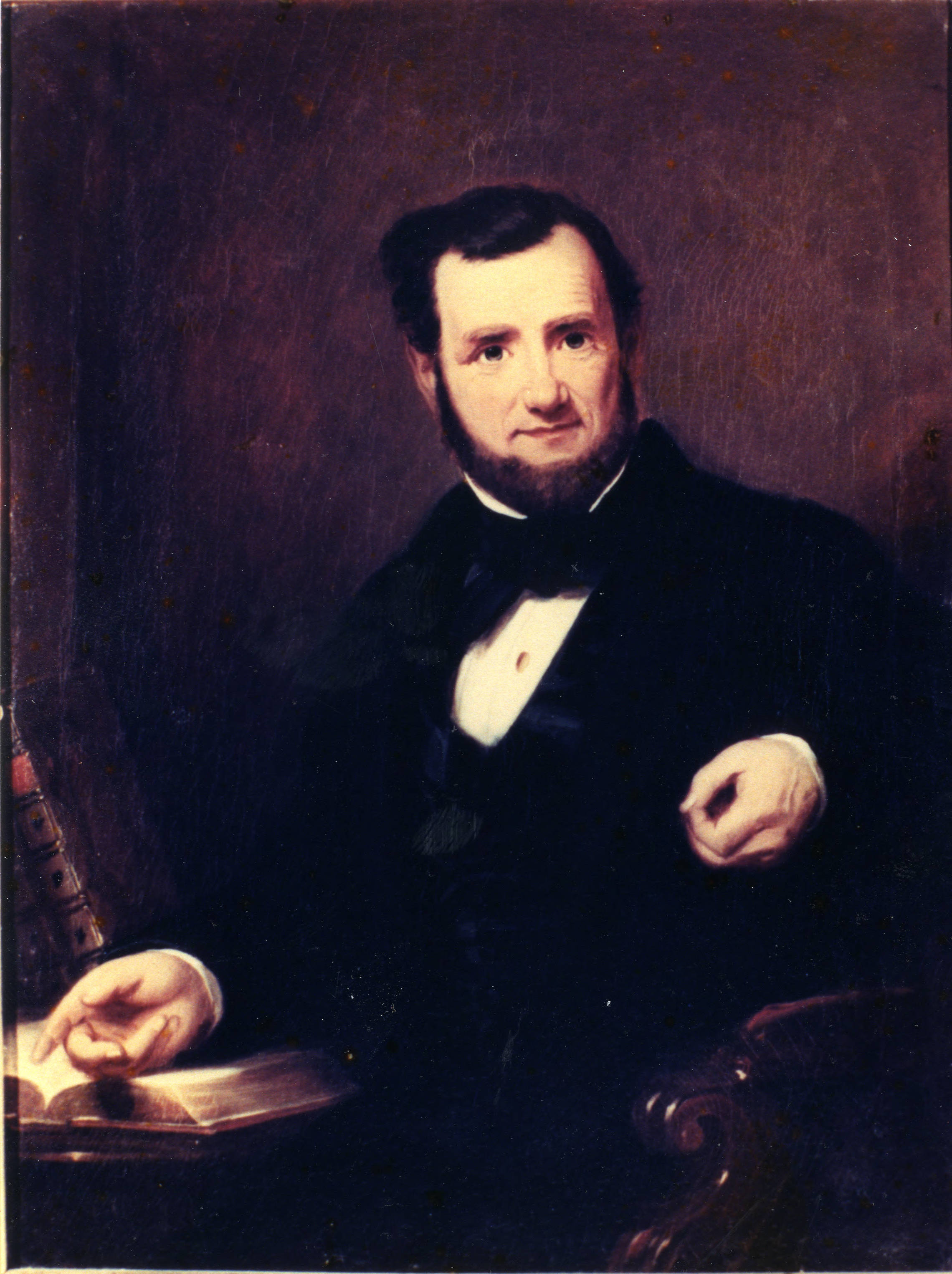
James Stone, former president of Kalamazoo College

James Stone, the first president of Kalamazoo College, led the school from 1842 through 1863 and was responsible for instituting the high academic standards that allowed the college to receive its charter. Shortly after becoming president, Stone proposed the addition of a theological seminary to increase the supply of ministers in the region. With the support of the Baptist church, classes at the Kalamazoo Theological Seminary began in 1848 with 11 students. At the same time, the Female Department continued to expand under the watchful eye of Lucinda Hinsdale Stone. In 1845–46, almost half of the 90 students enrolled in Kalamazoo were women. Kalamazoo College also served as a pioneer in coed education, granting its first degree to a woman, Catherine V. Eldred, in 1870.

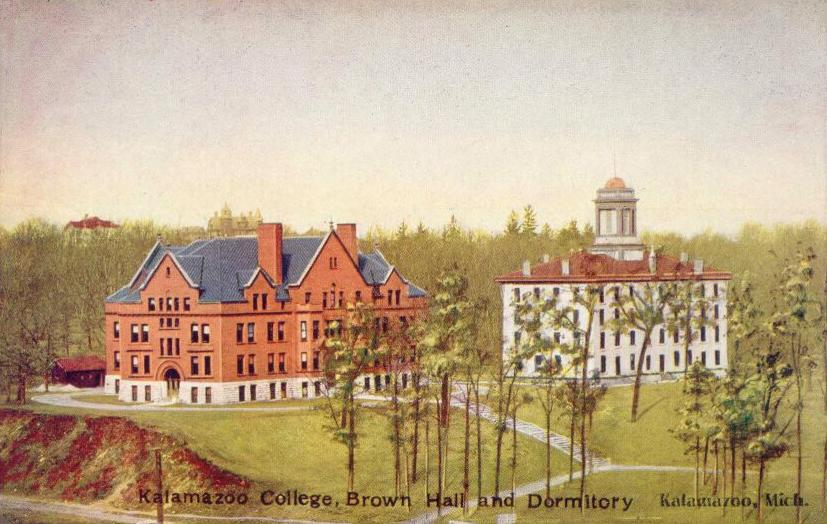
Brown Hall and dormitory in 1906

In 1877, Kalamazoo College students published the first edition of The Index, a student-run newspaper that continues to publish today. The college also publishes The Cauldron, an annual literary-arts journal, and The Passage, an annual compilation of students' work from study abroad.

Kalamazoo College's reputation was built during the presidency of Weimer Hicks, who served from 1954 to 1971. Hicks conceived of the "K Plan" program under which most Kalamazoo students spend at least one term abroad and spend at least one term working in an academic internship.

On January 3, 2006, Kalamazoo College opened the new Upjohn Library Commons which includes the completely renovated skeleton of the older library, and an extension which adds to its volume capacity.

A marker designating the college as a Michigan Historic Site was erected in 1983 by the Michigan History Division, Department of State. The inscription reads:

The first classroom building for the Michigan and Huron Institute, now Kalamazoo College, was erected on this site between June and September of 1836. The charter bill for the school had been introduced in the Michigan Territorial Legislative Council on January 18, 1833, and signed into law by Governor George B. Porter on April 22, 1833. Village pledges supplied funds for the two-story frame classroom structure, which was the start of Michigan’s first church-related college.

== Academics ==
=== Admissions ===
Admissions statistics
- 2020 entering class
- Admit rate: 74.3 (▲ +2.7)
- Yield rate: 14.9 (▼ −5.9)

Test scores middle 50%^{[i]}
- SAT Total: 1150-1360 (among 44% of FTFs)
- ACT Composite: 25-30 (among 20% of FTFs)

Kalamazoo is considered "more selective" by U.S. News & World Report. For the Class of 2024 (enrolled fall 2020), Kalamazoo received 3,456 applications and accepted 2,569 (74.3%). Of those accepted, 384 enrolled, a yield rate (the percentage of accepted students who choose to attend the university) of 14.9%. Kalamazoo's freshman retention rate is 83%, with 79% going on to graduate within six years.

Of the 44% of enrolled freshmen in 2020 who submitted SAT scores; the middle 50 percent Composite scores were 1150–1360. Of the 20% of the incoming freshman class who submitted ACT scores; the middle 50 percent Composite score was between 25 and 30.

Together with Michigan State University, Michigan Technological University, Wayne State University, Hillsdale College, Calvin University, and Hope College, Kalamazoo College is one of the seven college-sponsors of the National Merit Scholarship Program in the state. The college sponsored 2 Merit Scholarship awards in 2020. In the 2020–2021 academic year, 2 first-year students were National Merit Scholars.

Fall First-Time Freshman Statistics
	2020	2019	2018	2017	2016	2015
Applicants	3,456	3,576	3,371	3,434	3,626	2,455
Admits	2,569	2,716	2,454	2,520	2,381	1,759
Admit rate	74.3	76.0	72.8	73.4	65.7	71.6
Enrolled	384	395	408	449	348	365
Yield rate	14.9	14.5	16.6	17.8	14.6	20.8
ACT composite* (out of 36)	25-30 (20%^{†})	25-31 (25%^{†})	24-31 (27%^{†})	26-30 (42%^{†})	26-30 (60%^{†})	26-30 (84%^{†})
SAT composite* (out of 1600)	1150-1360 (44%^{†})	1170-1370 (53%^{†})	1140-1370 (40%^{†})	1180-1380 (39%^{†})	—	—
* middle 50% range^{†} percentage of first-time freshmen who chose to submit

=== Rankings ===
Academic rankings

Liberal arts
- U.S. News & World Report: 67 (tie) out of 207

In 2026, U.S. News & World Report ranked Kalamazoo College tied at No. 67 out of 207 National Liberal Arts Colleges, tied at No.36 in Best Undergraduate Teaching, tied at No. 34 in Most Innovative Schools, No.4 in Study Abroad, and tied at No.40 in Top Performers on Social Mobility.

=== Academic distinctions ===
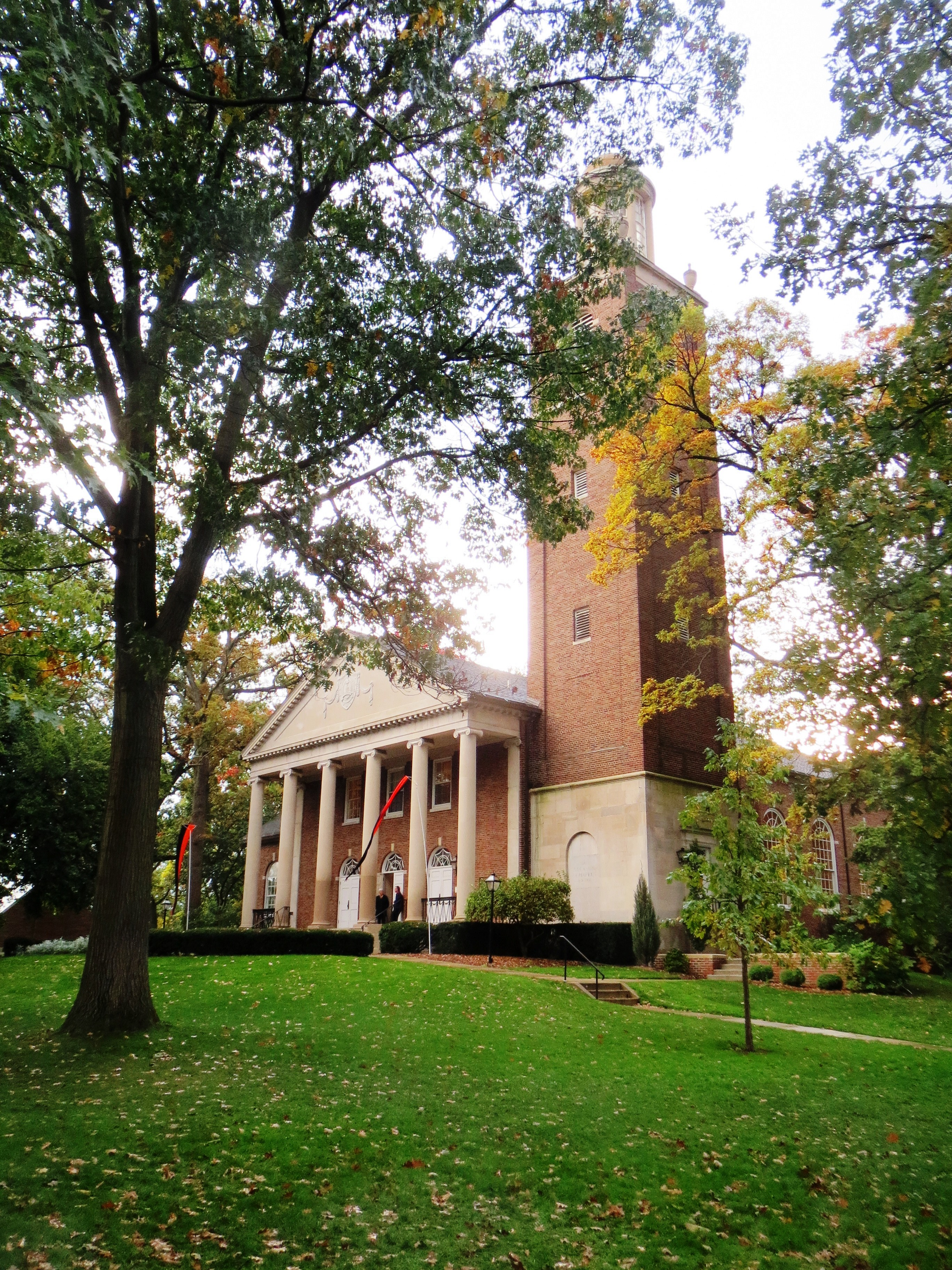
Stetson Chapel

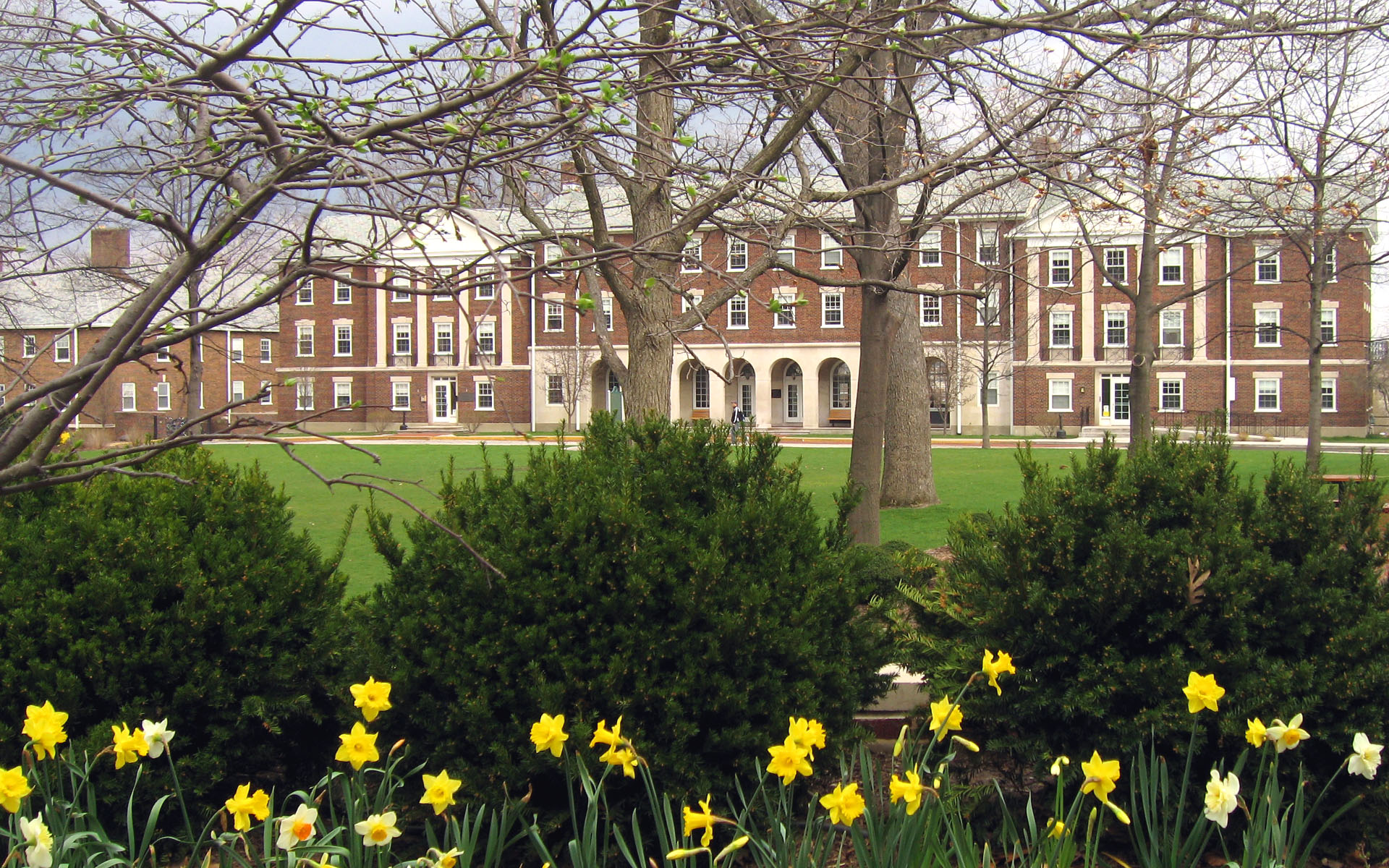
Hoben Hall, seen from Hicks Center

Kalamazoo offers 30 majors spread across the fields of Fine Arts, Humanities, Modern and Classical Languages and Literature, Natural Sciences and Mathematics, and Social Sciences. Additionally, the college offers 22 minors, 5 special programs, and 13 concentrations. It is listed in Loren Pope's Colleges That Change Lives. Its most popular majors, in terms of 2021 graduates, were:

Biology/Biological Sciences (70)
Business/Commerce (55)
Chemistry (44)
Psychology (36)
Social Sciences (27)
English Language & Literature (24)

A 2017 study by Higher Education Data Sharing lists Kalamazoo College in the top 2 percent of four-year liberal arts colleges in the United States whose graduates go on to earn a Ph.D. According to this study, Kalamazoo College is ranked number seventeen among all private liberal arts colleges and — when compared with all academic institutions — it ranks number thirty-three in Ph.D.s per capita. Among all undergraduate institutions, Kalamazoo College was first per capita in 2005 for recruitment of Peace Corps volunteers.

96 percent of full-time faculty hold a Ph.D. or the terminal degree in their field.

=== The K Plan ===
Kalamazoo College emphasizes the importance of experiential education. The academic plan — known as the "K plan" — consists of a rigorous liberal arts education supplemented by experience abroad and in the Kalamazoo community.

Students at Kalamazoo College must fulfill specific degree requirements in order to graduate, as well as completion of three Shared Passages Seminars during the first, sophomore, and senior years at Kalamazoo. First-year seminars focus on developing writing and communication skills, sophomore seminars emphasize international culture and experience in preparation for study abroad, and senior seminars focus on major specific or interdisciplinary topics to cap a student's education experience. Upon graduation, students must demonstrate a proficiency in a second language at an intermediate level, satisfy a quantitative reasoning requirement, and complete a senior individualized project which may take the form of a thesis, an artistic performance, or any other work-intensive project of a student's choosing. These experiences are supplemented by one or more terms abroad, service-learning projects during school terms, and internship opportunities during the summer.

=== Service-learning ===
Kalamazoo College initiated the service-learning program in 1997. In 2001, Trustee Ronda Stryker dedicated to her grandmother the Mary Jane Underwood Stryker Institute for Service learning. This Institute was created to house several service-Learning programs in the school. The current director of the Mary Jane Underwood Stryker Institute is Alison Geist. In 2008, Kalamazoo College had twenty-three on-going service-learning programs. Several courses in the college incorporate service-learning into their curricula. Programs in service-learning include Community Advocates for Parents and Students, Helping Youth through Personal Empowerment, Academic Mentorship In Giants On-going Success, the Woodward School, Keeping the Doors Open, and Farms to K.

=== Study abroad ===
About 70% of Kalamazoo College students spend at least one term abroad and the college maintains partnerships with over 45 programs and 22 countries on six continents. One of the programs is the International Sustainable Development Studies Institute in Thailand. Students at Kalamazoo College typically study abroad during their third (junior) Year, and each academic department designs its requirements in a way that assumes majors will study abroad for all or part of junior year though some students may choose to do a short-term study abroad during their second (sophomore) or fourth (senior) year.

=== Center for Career and Professional Development ===
In 2009, the Center Career Development merged with the Guilds of Kalamazoo College to create the Center for Career and Professional Development. Opportunities through the CCPD include the Discovery Externship Program and the Field Experience Program

== Student life and traditions ==
Student organizations are one of the main sources of entertainment for the student body. They routinely bring in speakers as well as stage performances, dances, and movie showings.

During the fall quarter, there are three main events: K Fest, the Homecoming dance, and Cafsgiving. At K Fest, student organizations provide activities for the students, such as pumpkin carving and bobbing for apples. Cafsgiving is a highly anticipated one-day celebration of Thanksgiving in the last week of the academic term, where the cafeteria hosts the entire student body for a large feast.

During the winter quarter, the college holds the annual Monte Carlo night, on which the student body raises money by gambling in a makeshift casino where the professors are the dealers. They play for scrip redeemable for prizes.

=== Pride Ball (formerly Crystal Ball) ===
Kaleidoscope (formerly known as the Gay, Lesbian, Bisexual, Transgender, and Ally Student Organization, GLBTSO) hosted the Crystal Ball each spring. Crystal Ball was a college-sponsored dance in which attendees would dress in drag or unusual costumes. A long-standing tradition at Kalamazoo, this event was created to educate the campus about GLBT issues and celebrate the persons who make up the GLBT community. In Spring of 2016 the Crystal Ball was renamed Pride Ball. The tradition continues in most other aspects; it is still hosted by the same club and attendees are still encouraged to don attire that thoughtfully represents or challenges their gender identity. This popular event features live music, dancing, and contests.

=== The Quad ===
The campus is built around a grassy hill known as "The Quad." The Quad is also the site of numerous large-scale events throughout the year, including Homecoming, Spring Fling, Convocation, and Commencement. At the top of the hill sits Stetson Chapel, a favorite location for alumni wedding services. The bell tower holds the only peal of change ringing bells in Michigan. They were all cast in 1983 at Whitechapel.

The Quad is home to another popular Kalamazoo College student tradition, "streaking the Quad," a noisy, late-night descent in the nude from the chapel, down the hill, and back to the top again. Tradition dictates that students must touch the school sign before returning to the top. There is a mass streak after the spring performance by Frelon, the Kalamazoo College dance group, and also during the day by the senior class. This often coincides with a wedding.

=== Day of Gracious Living ===
Since 1974, the college has upheld a springtime tradition of canceling all classes for a "Day of Gracious Living" (DOGL). While it was originally instituted (despite the Student Commission's rejection) as a day for students to relax and have fun, the 1980 Kalamazoo tornado prompted students to spend that year's DOGL helping clean up after the storm and giving back to their community. Many students enjoy the day at the North Beach in South Haven, Michigan. The date is determined by the president of the Student Commission and kept secret from the student body, though it is usually on a Wednesday during weeks 7–9. On the morning of the Day of Gracious Living, the bells of Stetson Chapel ring, announcing the day to the student body.

=== Recycling program ===
Kalamazoo College has become a leading institution in the area of recycling and environmental awareness. A crew of student workers operates one of the nation's most successful recycling programs and organizes the school's participation in the annual RecycleMania event, a competition among over 400 colleges and universities across the United States. In 2005, Kalamazoo College came to national prominence with a 3rd-place finish in the Grand Champion category. While annually placing in the top five in a variety of categories, in 2008 Kalamazoo College placed first in both the Grand Champion and Stephen K. Gaski Per Capita Classic competitions.

=== Sustainability ===
Kalamazoo College signed the President's Climate Commitment in 2007 and has completed a greenhouse gas emission inventory. The college's Hicks Student Center is partially powered by wind and solar energy, and the student group D.I.R.T. (Digging in Renewable Turf) maintains an organic garden on campus. The spring 2009 Energy Sting competition encouraged students to reduce their energy consumption. Kalamazoo received a B on the 2010 College Sustainability Report Card.

=== Beginning Band Methods ===
One of Kalamazoo's most popular courses is "Beginning Band Methods", with over 100 students enrolling annually. Open to all students, including those with no musical experience, the courses train them to play brass and woodwind instruments. At the end of the term, the students perform a public concert.

== Presidents of Kalamazoo College ==
In January 2016, Jorge Gonzalez was announced as Kalamazoo College's 18th president. He was scheduled to take office on July 1, 2016, and has declared that he will host multiple new interdisciplinary programmes, such as Latin American studies and public health.

In 2005, Eileen Wilson-Oyelaran became Kalamazoo College's 17th president and first female president, as well as the first African-American president of the school. She is the 22nd president overall, including interim and acting presidents. Her immediate predecessors are Bernard Palchick, who served as interim president and returned to the administration; and James F. Jones, who departed to become president of Trinity College in Connecticut.

- Nathaniel Marsh (1835)
- Walter Clark (1835–1836)
- Nathaniel Aldrich Balch (1836–1838)
- David Alden (1838–1840)
- William Dutton (1840–1843), after whom Dutton Street was named; fifth and last principal teacher
- James Stone (1843–1863)
- John Milton Gregory (1864–1867)
- Kendall Brooks (1868–1887)
- Monson A. Wilcox (1887–1891)
- Theodore Nelson (1891–1892)
- Arthur Gaylord Slocum (1892–1912)
- Herbert Lee Stetson (1912–1922)
- Allan Hoben (1922–1935)
- Charles True Goodsell (1935–1936) (interim)
- Stewart Grant Cole (1936–1938)
- Paul Lamont Thompson (1938–1948)
- Allen B. Stowe (1948–1949) (interim)
- John Scott Everton (1949–1953)
- Harold T. Smith (1953) (interim)
- Weimer K. Hicks (1953–1971)
- George M. Rainsford (1972–1983)
- David W. Breneman (1983–1989)
- Timothy Light (1989–1990) (acting)
- Lawrence D. Bryan (1990–1996)
- James F. Jones (1996–2004)
- Bernard Palchick (2004–2005) (interim)
- Eileen Wilson-Oyelaran (2005-2016)
- Jorge Gonzalez (2016–2026)
- Karlyn Crowley (2026–Present)

== Athletics ==
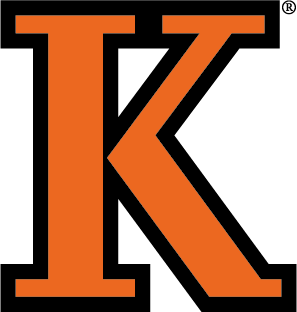
Kalamazoo athletics monogram

The college's sports teams are known as the Hornets. They compete in the NCAA's Division III and the Michigan Intercollegiate Athletic Association (MIAA). As of 2016, the Hornet men's tennis squad had won its conference's championship 78 consecutive years.
