= Leverett Baldwin =

American politician

Leverett Sherman Baldwin (October 28, 1839 – October 14, 1897) was an American politician.

Baldwin was born in Hinesburg, Vermont. He lived in Mattoon, Illinois and worked for the Illinois and St. Louis Railroad. He served in the Illinois House of Representatives from 1893 to 1895. Baldwin was a Democrat. He died at his home in Mattoon, Illinois after suffering a stroke.
