= James Stone =

James Stone may refer to:

- James M. Stone (1817–1880), politician in the Massachusetts House of Representatives
- James W. Stone (1813–1854), United States Representative from Kentucky
- James L. Stone (1922–2012), United States Army officer and Medal of Honor recipient
- James Stone (academic administrator) (1810–1888), first president of Kalamazoo College
- James Stone (American football) (born 1992), American football player
- James Stone (executive) (born 1947), American business executive
- James Stone (physicist), astrophysicist on the faculty of the IAS
- James Riley Stone (1908–2005), Canadian military commander
- Jamie Stone (politician) (born 1954), Scottish politician
- Jamie Magnus Stone (born 1985), Scottish film director and animator

== See also ==
- Stein Stone (James Nollner Stone Sr., 1882–1926), college football and basketball coach
- James Stone, ring name of American wrestler James Maritato
- J. Riley Stone (1886–1978), Wisconsin State Assemblyman
- Jimmy Stone (1876–1942), English cricketer
