= Ladies' Library Association of Kalamazoo =

Woman's club in Kalamazoo, Michigan, USA

- Formation: 1852
- Founder: Lucinda Hinsdale Stone
- Founded at: Kalamazoo, Michigan
- Type: Woman's club
- Website: ladieslibrarykzoo.org

The Ladies' Library Association of Kalamazoo (LLA) is a woman's club in Kalamazoo, Michigan. Officially incorporated in 1852 it was the first women's club organized in Michigan and the third organized in the United States. Its purpose was to promote the cause of equal education for women.

== History ==
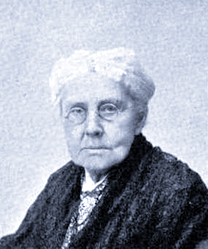
Lucinda Hinsdale Stone

The Ladies' Library Association of Kalamazoo (LLA) grew from a reading group first organized in 1844. One of the original organizers was Lucinda Hinsdale Stone. During the mid-19th century the LLA provided library services to the local residents. Yearly subscriptions cost fifty cents and were available to both men and women, however only women could be members of the organization. The collection expanded, first being housed in members houses, to the Kalamazoo County Courthouse and then Corporation Hall.

Before formally developing into a library, the LLA held meetings in private homes “under the guise of sewing group gatherings” in which members would read aloud from books as they sewed. As the association grew in size, they decided to rent spaces to hold their meetings at several locations across the town of Kalamazoo. During the 19th century, it was common for social libraries or ladies library associations to operate on a subscription basis.

In addition to creating Kalamazoo's first lending library, the LLA activities have included advocating for the right for women to vote, the creation of day nurseries for working mothers, founding Kalamazoo's first art club, and establishing a community education program for women. Despite the LLA’s transition from an organized women’s club to a more general library, once formally established, the LLA sought to expand its role within their local community. Carlson (2014) suggested that the most visible way in which this was accomplished was through "the development of a library to promote moral and intellectual improvement".

== The Building ==
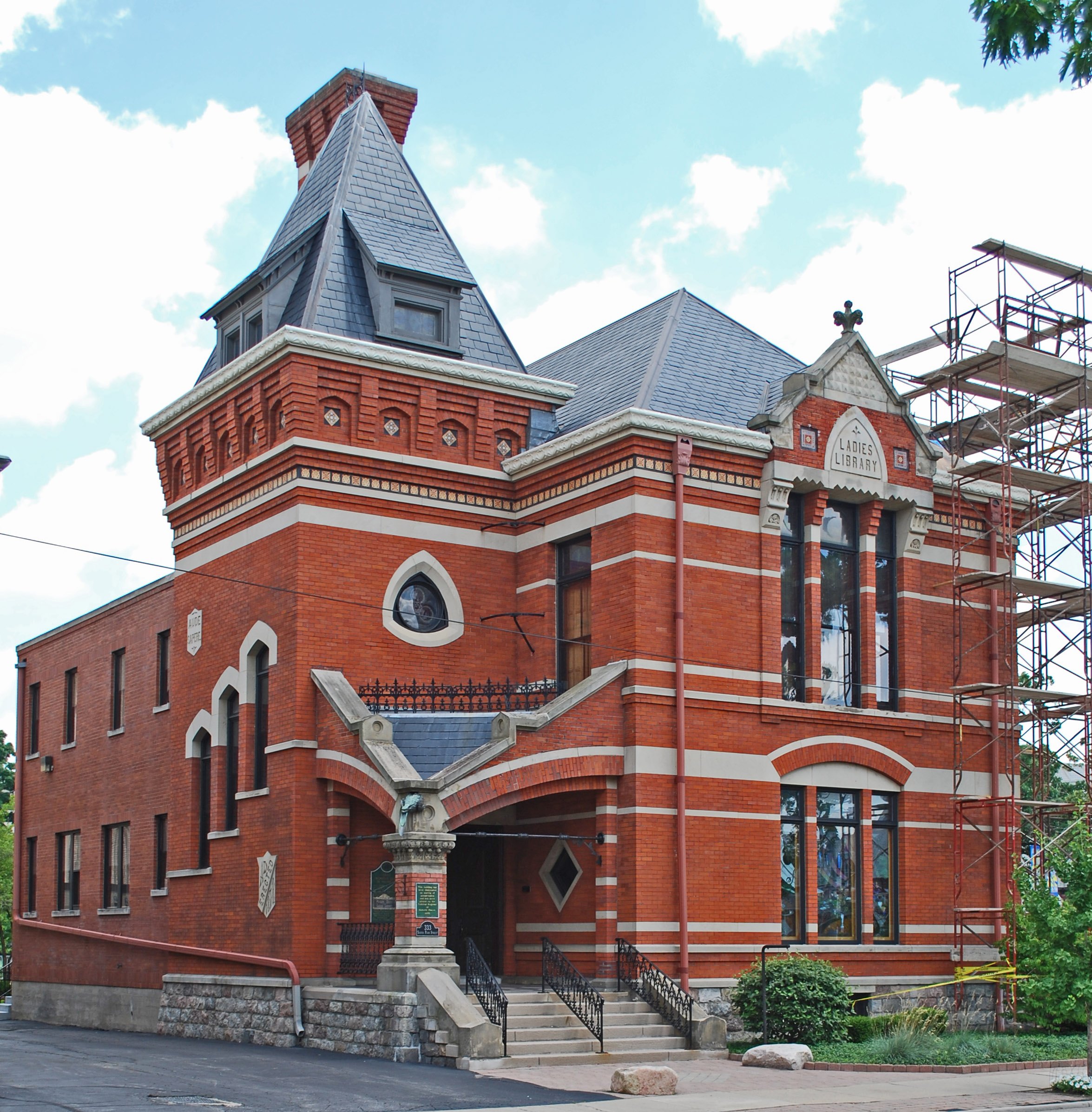
Ladies Library Association Building

The Ladies Library Association Building in Kalamazoo, Michigan was the first building erected as a women's club in the United States. It was also the country's first structure owned by a women's organization. It was built in 1879 in the Venetian Gothic Revival style.

Further, the LLA finalized construction of their 21st Century Capital Campaign project in 2013 which allowed for an addition to their preexisting facility and renovations designed to bring "the building up to current building and fire safety codes and American Disabilities Act standards (with barrier-free entrance, restrooms and elevator)". Since its creation, the LLA has continued to serve as a pillar of support in its community through providing outreach, support, and assuring equality and accessibility to all patrons.
