= International Sustainable Development Studies Institute =

International programs institute in Chiang Mai, Thailand

Coordinates: 18.8162°N 98.9809°E

The International Sustainable Development Studies Institute (ISDSI), based in Chiang Mai, Thailand, is an educational institution offering experiential study-abroad programs for students currently enrolled at universities and colleges in the United States. ISDSI's semester-long programs immerse students in the cultures of Thailand by taking participants out of the traditional classroom and into the expedition field. During each course, students go on multi-day expeditions to various regions of Thailand and experience first-hand the cultures and ecologies of the country. Courses are hands-on while teaching students about sustainable development and its relationship to local communities. Participants also spend the majority of time living in homestays and with locals.

Taking an approach to education that entails hands-on learning, cultural immersion, and local engagement has led to ISDSI's education model being the topic of journal articles and conference seminars.

Sending Schools include: Yale University, University of California, Berkeley, Cornell University, Kalamazoo College, Calvin College and Wheaton College.

== Risk Management ==
With students and staff undertaking multiple expeditions and spending a large portion of time in the wilderness, ISDSI emphasizes the importance of risk management and creating steps to prevent injury while handling risky situations. ISDSI's risk management practices have been referenced by a variety of organizations and were presented at the 2004 Wilderness Risk Management Conference.

== History ==
The International Sustainable Development Studies Institute (ISDSI) is based in Chiang Mai, Thailand and began as an initiative of the Center for International Programs at Kalamazoo College in 1999. ISDSI was originally located on the campus of Chiang Mai University, but in 2004, ISDSI moved to its own location after gaining legal status as a Thai foundation.

== Legal Status and Governance ==
In 2004, ISDSI was registered as a project under The Foundation for Experiential Learning in Thailand. The foundation is governed by a board of directors that hold ISDSI's Executive Director accountable. ISDSI is also registered as a 501C-3 Non-Profit in the United States.
