= Lucinda Hinsdale Stone =

American feminist, educator, traveler, writer and philanthropist

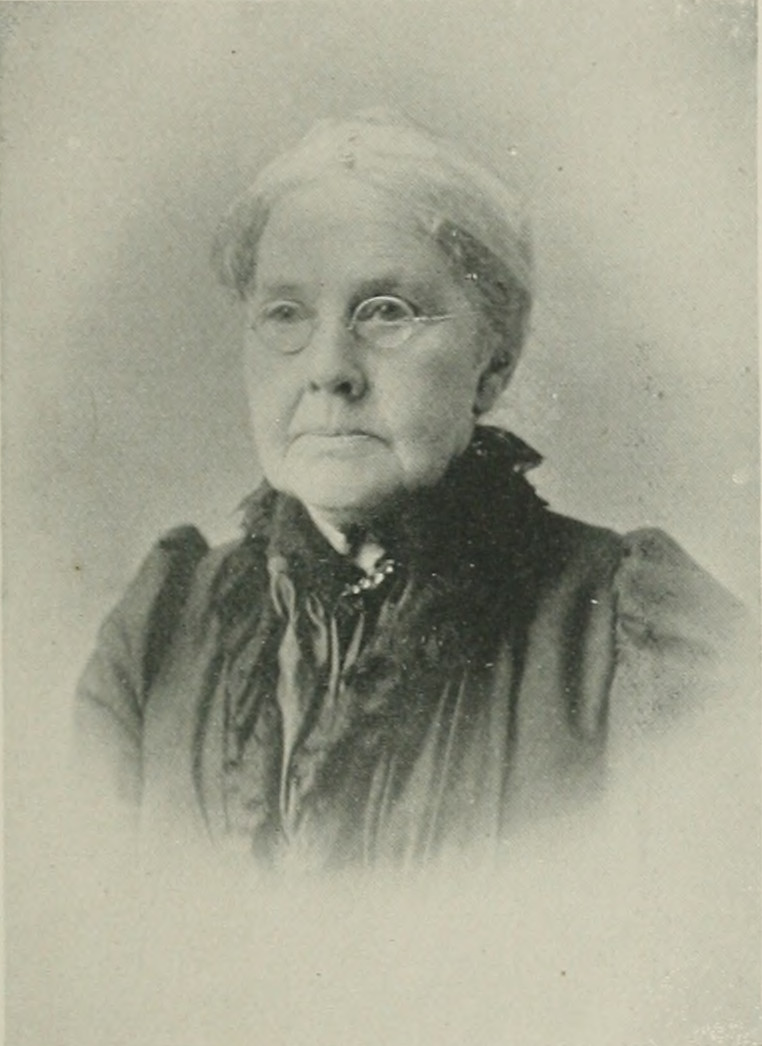
- Born: Lucinda Hinsdale; September 30, 1814; Hinesburg, Vermont, U.S.
- Died: March 14, 1900 (aged 85)
- Education: Honorary Degree LL.D., University of Michigan
- Occupations: feminist, educator, traveler, journalist, philanthropist
- Spouse: James Andrus Blinn Stone (m. 1840)
- Relatives: Elihu Burritt, Emma Willard, Maria Mitchell
- Writing career
- Pen name: L. H. S.
- Language: English

Lucinda Hinsdale Stone (pen name, L. H. S.; September 30, 1814 – March 14, 1900) was an early American feminist, educator, traveler, writer, and philanthropist. Stone was the first woman in the United States to take classes of young women abroad to study, as a means to illustrate history and literature.

She came to Kalamazoo, Michigan, with her husband who was president of Kalamazoo College, then a part of the University of Michigan. She taught there and she established co-education at the university. Through her influence, women were placed in the university's faculty and scholarships were awarded to women. She believed in self-development for service and was directly responsible for founding fifty woman's literary and study clubs in the Midwestern United States. She was awarded the Honorary Degree LL.D., by the University of Michigan.

Stone advocated for women's voting rights and educational opportunities, in addition to abolition of slavery. At the end of the 19th century, Stone was the oldest woman journalist in Michigan, and was the honorary president of the Michigan Woman's Press Association. In 1890, she traveled the length of the Southern Peninsula to become a charter member and help organize the first Michigan Woman's Press Association.

== Early years and education ==
Lucinda Hinsdale was born in Hinesburg, Vermont, September 30, 1814. She was the youngest of a family of twelve children who were born to Lucinda Mitchell and Aaron Hinsdale. The Hinsdale family was from the house de Hinnsdale of France whose records go back to 1170. Their Coat-of-Arms is described in the French records of nobility and were on display in the Astor Library. She was related to Elihu Burritt "the learned blacksmith" and Emma Willard of the Troy Seminary. She was also related, through her mother, to Maria Mitchell, the astronomer.

Early on, she developed a habit of early rising that continued all her life, saying that:— "... the best of any literary work I have ever done, most of the continued study of any language begun in school, many hundreds of articles written for newspapers, foreign correspondence with newspapers, hundreds of letters written to clubs, and almost my entire correspondence, which has been large, has been done in the early morning hours, before anyone else was astir in the house. This time I have felt was mine, and somehow the freshness of those early sunrise hours of my childhood would come back to me in the early morning, and I could not sleep or lose these early hours. When traveling abroad, my exploration and study of cathedrals and most of the remarkable churches in Rome and in various cities of Europe have been made in the early morning. Such places were always open, and it was the most quiet time to visit them, and I have been able to get into many a nook and corner of old churches that I could not have been able to peer into when there were crowds of other visitors there also."

At the age of thirteen, she entered Hinesburg Academy and at fifteen, taught a summer country school, returning to the academy in the fall and teaching again the next summer. The trustees of the academy, recognizing her thirst for knowledge, gave her the then unheard of privilege of entering the classes with the young men who were being fitted for college. She pursued the studies of Greek and Latin with them. She not only kept up with them but studied music and French besides. She did not, however, enter University of Vermont with them. Occasionally, the president or some of the professors of Middlebury College, which was south of her town, and Vermont University at Burlington, to the north, came to preach to her class. School teachers for her winter school were students from one or the other of these colleges.

When about 18, she went away to a ladies' seminary in Middlebury, for a year because this was considered necessary as a finishing process in young women's education. But the ladies' seminary was disappointing to Stone, the teaching not nearly so broad or thorough as that of our academy. In many of the classes, Stone felt that she could have taught quite as well as the students were taught, and in fact, she was often asked to step in in case of illness or absence of the teacher to teach a class.

== Career ==
=== Educator ===
She came west to Grand Rapids, Michigan, to visit her sister Mrs. Mary Hinsdale Walker, and there she met again Rev. James Andrus Blinn Stone, a Baptist minister, settled at that time in Gloucester, Massachusetts, whose acquaintance she had made while in Hinesburg. They were married on June 10, 1840, by the Rev. James Ballard of Grand Rapids. Mrs. Stone was then twenty-six years old. They had three sons, Clement Walker (born 1841), Horatio Hackett (1843-1870), and James Helm (born 1847).

Soon after marriage, Mr. Stone was called to fill the professorship of Biblical Literature in Newton Theological Institution during the absence of his friend, Dr. Horatio Balch Hackett, in Europe for about a year and a half. From there they came to Kalamazoo, Michigan, where Mr. Stone was called to take charge of one of the so-called "branches" of the University of Michigan, which, when they were established, it was supposed were to be permanent feeders of the university as preparatory schools which should draw to it students from every part of the state. But the branches being soon cut off for want of state funds to support them, a Baptist institute, the first literary institution founded in Michigan, the teaching in which had been suspended when the branch of the university was located at Kalamazoo, was revived and grew, principally through Dr. Stone's efforts, into Kalamazoo College, for which he obtained a charter from the Michigan State Legislature.

Mr. Stone served as the first president of Kalamazoo College from 1843 to 1863. During this time, Lucinda Hinsdale Stone led the college's Ladies Department. Mrs. Stone taught classes throughout Michigan, including Grand Rapids; Jackson; Bay City; Dowagiac; Coldwater; Saginaw; Port Huron; St. Clair; Alpena; Adrian; Monroe; Hillsdale; Lansing; Charlotte; Detroit; Eaton Rapids; Flint; Dearborn and Battle Creek. Clubs for women followed these classes.

=== Suffrage and abolition ===
Both Stones promoted abolition, co-education, and women's rights. Mrs. Stone ardently desired and did all in her power to advance the cause of woman's suffrage, though she died without seeing the enfranchisement of women. She had to go south to learn fully the meaning of the word "Abolitionist." While teaching in Burlington Seminary, she received an invitation to go south to Mississippi to teach in the family of a wealthy planter. She had heard of slavery but had no real idea of its meaning and her first introduction came as she was passing through Natchez, Mississippi, to her new place of residence.

She had intimate association with anti-slavery leaders, among whom were William Lloyd Garrison, Lydia Maria Child, Parker Pillsbury, and Frederick Douglass. She was a most earnest colleague of suffrage reformers Julia Ward Howe, Elizabeth Cady Stanton, Lucy Stone, and Susan B. Anthony.

=== Writer ===
For forty years she was connected in one way or another with various newspapers, and for a great many years was a staff member of the Detroit Tribune, her letters of travel, over the initials "L. H. S.," having been one of the chief attractions of the columns of that paper. Her abiding sentiment: "whatsoever things are true, and good, and holy, must be done by men and women working together, without jealousy or prejudice, without distinction of caste or sex."

Mrs. Stone was the author of, Western Side. As a journalist, Mrs. Stone reached hundreds of thousands of readers on articles related to social and moral issues. Among the many newspapers in which her articles appeared is the Kalamazoo Telegraph. Mrs. Stone's comprehensive letters of travel in foreign countries were published in many newspapers. For years Mrs. Stone served as the honorary president of the Michigan Woman's Press Association. The literary work of Mrs. Stone was continued almost till she died. Among the last articles she wrote was a contribution to the Twentieth Century Club regarding the daughter of the Scotch poet, Robert Burns.

Ralph Waldo Emerson was a close friend and they corresponded for years.

=== Traveling schools ===
After many years spent in teaching, the Stones traveled abroad. Mrs. Stone was quick to see the advantages to be gained from studying history and art from their very origin. Like an inspiration there came to her the idea of "traveling schools" or classes. This she put into execution in 1867. Her long experience as a teacher of art, literature and the languages enabled her to carry out a most valuable itinerary. Eight times she conducted classes abroad spending from one year to eighteen months each time. On one occasion, the tour included Egypt, Palestine and Syria.

== Clubs ==
The Ladies' Library Association and the Twentieth Century Club were the first and the last of the numerous clubs founded by Mrs. Stone in Kalamazoo during her life. The first named, the Ladies' Library Association was founded in 1852 and had its origin in a history class founded by her which after a few years of successful study was merged into a literary club with Mrs. Stone as its president. This association built for itself a building on Park Street in which were gathered choice paintings, statuary and a valuable library. The Twentieth Century Club was the last one organized by Mrs. Stone. Under her care, it grew until the library parlors and hall of her house overflowed, eventually resulting in the construction of the Stone Memorial Building. The various clubs throughout Michigan endowed a perpetual scholarship in Mrs. Stone's name in the University of Michigan for young women desiring an education. The $5,000 was raised and given to the university in the fall of 1905. A portrait of Mrs. Stone, commonly known as "Michigan's Mother of Clubs", was a joint gift of two literary societies founded by her in Kalamazoo, The Ladies' Library Association and The Twentieth Century Club. She also established the Douglas Club of Kalamazoo for African Americans, in whom she had always taken the most active interest.

Returning from her last journey of foreign travel, and at the age of seventy-six, she was appointed to organize Isabella Clubs in the Fourth Congressional District, so that "features of interest in the forthcoming World's Fair in Chicago in 1893 might be better appreciated by its members". She took an unbounded interest in this work, giving regular and personal attention to it. To accomplish this, she traveled several days in each week, which seemed not to weary her greatly. Each Thursday found her in her own library in Kalamazoo with the earnest women composing the Isabella Club of that place gathered about her and it was here that her nature was most clearly noted. This merit was recognized by the University of Michigan when they conferred upon her the degree of Ph.D. in 1891.

The Isabella Clubs throughout the state expired by limitation in the spring of 1893. A large number of them organized anew, retaining their membership and taking other names. It was at this juncture that the Twentieth Century Club of Kalamazoo came into existence, with a large charter membership and Mrs. Stone was chosen as perpetual president, which place she filled until her death seven years later, March 14, 1900, at the age of eighty-five.

== Legacy ==
In 1983, Lucinda Hinsdale Stone was recognized for her efforts in advancing the cause of women's rights through induction into the Michigan Women's Hall of Fame. Stone is credited with advocating on behalf of the first female student admitted to the University of Michigan in 1870. The University of Michigan created the Lucinda Hinsdale Stone Senior Faculty Award in recognition of Stone's efforts to earn women admission to the university. One of the chapters of the Daughters of the American Revolution is named in her honor.
