= Weimer Hicks =

12th President of Kalamazoo College
- In office 1954–1971

Personal details
- Born: Weimer Kerr Hicks; May 9, 1909
- Died: April 1985 (aged 75)

Weimer Kerr Hicks (May 9, 1909 – April 1985) was an American academic administrator who worked as the 12th president Kalamazoo College from 1954 to 1971.

== Career ==
Hicks worked as an administrator and coach at the Peddie School and as headmaster of Wayland Academy.

During his tenure as president of Kalamazoo College, Hicks worked to implement the "K Plan", an academic program that serves as the basis for the liberal arts education which students receive at the school. Hicks conceived of the "K Plan" program under which most Kalamazoo students spend at least one term abroad and spend at least one term working in an academic internship. The student center on campus is named for Hicks.
