= MicroSociety =

American educational non-profit organization

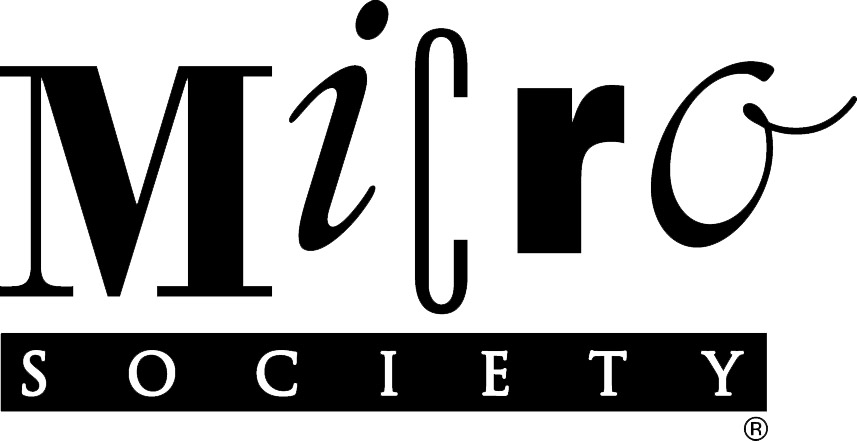
- Type: Corporation
- Industry: Education Management
- Founded: 1991
- Founder: George H. Richmond
- Headquarters: Philadelphia, Pennsylvania, U.S
- Website: www.microsociety.org

MicroSociety, Inc is a non-profit organization located in Old City, Philadelphia, that has been preparing children to compete in the global economy for more than 20 years and is operating in over 300 schools across the United States.

The concept of MicroSociety was developed and founded by a Brooklyn teacher, George H. Richmond, in 1967. This concept was founded based on the idea that children need motivation and initiative to attend and stay in school. Richmond then launched MicroSociety Inc. in 1991.

MicroSociety specializes in creating learning environments in grades K-12 which allows students to apply classroom knowledge to a real-world setting. The MicroSociety Learning Environment offers students authentic, hands-on learning through the creation and experience of dynamic miniature societies, reinforced by educators with classroom curricula. The organization provides curriculum, professional development, and coaching to teachers involved in the educational program.

Currently, there are around 250,000 students and graduates of MicroSociety. This includes school wide, partial school, after school, summer camp, and some classroom programs. MicroSociety is operating in more than 40 states and 6 countries including the U.S.

MicroSociety was named one of the two best educational programs for elementary schools in The Best Schools by Thomas Armstrong. MicroSociety has been featured in TIME, Newsweek, FAST Company, Edutopia, Family Life, The World and I, TEACHER, Redbook, Sesame Street's Kid City, Harvard's ED. Magazine, the Wall Street Journal, New York Times, Education Week, and Barron's 1100 Words You Need To Know. Segments have appeared on CNN, ABC, and CBS. MicroSociety has been the subject of several documentaries on PBS and the Discovery Channel has won several national awards and been the subject of numerous books.

== History ==
The MicroSociety program was the dream child of George Richmond, a painter, teacher, author and educator who was raised by a single mother in poverty in the tenements of Manhattan's Lower East Side. His first job, at a Brooklyn elementary school in 1967, was a "rookie teacher's nightmare". His fifth graders skipped class, scorned homework and slept through lectures, their apathy and Cynicism surpassed only by their appetite for classroom warfare.

Grades and testing were a basic dilemma. A grade on a paper or a score on a standardized test could not be saved, or invested, or traded for something of value. George began paying his students – in fake money – for completed assignments, good marks, and perfect attendance. Students then used that money to play a game – a sort of life-sized, walking version of Monopoly – in which they built, sold, and mortgaged various cardboard “properties” placed on shelving around the classroom. Some used their profits to start up ventures: a postal service, a comic book company, a loan agency. Disputes eventually led to the creation of laws, peace officers, courts, and a constitutional convention. They began to discover the relevance of reading and math through managing their society. Harvard invited this young innovator to come for his doctorate. His thesis, The MICROSOCIETY School: A Real World in Miniature, was published by Harper & Row in 1973 and excerpted in New Times magazine that same year.

Between 1970 and 1979, Richmond established classroom micro-societies in New York and Hartford, Connecticut. In 1981, he helped launch the nation's first school-wide MicroSociety in Lowell, Massachusetts. Initial media coverage included The MacNeil/Lehrer NewsHour, Phi Delta Kappan and Chrysler Corporation underwrote a two-hour documentary entitled Learning In America: Schools That Work, which featured Lowell's MicroSociety School.

Richmond left education and did not return until 1991 when he and his wife, Carolynn King, a Harvard trained educator with a law degree from Villanova, launched the Consortium of MicroSociety Schools, a loose association of like-minded educators interested in society building as a strategy to stimulate learning. MicroSociety, Inc. (“MSI”) was established as a non-profit consulting service and by 1993 the number of MicroSociety programs had doubled. Together, Carolynn and George wrote the first MicroSociety Handbook and along with other educators wrote a library of curriculum and a three-year training sequence for teachers. The National Association of Elementary School Principals middle Matters recognized the model as one that was able to “make a good school even better.” By 1999, MSI became a full service professional organization working with schools in some of the nation's most at-risk communities and was approved by the U.S. Department of Education through the Northwest Regional Educational Laboratory.

For ten years, refinements and adaptations to MicroSociety were made in order to address the needs of varied populations and relationships with over 60 school districts were built and maintained. By 2011, MicroSociety had been implemented in 300 elementary and middle schools impacting 250,000 students in 40 states and in 2012 schools opened in Bermuda, Canada, South America, and Africa. During this time, MSI created:

- The Reading Industry, a literacy program designed to connect language arts to the technical world of the work place
- Society In Action, a social studies framework
- Citizens In Action, a student leadership model
- MicroSociety AfterSchool for out-of-school time
- MicroSociety Summer Camp, MicroSociety STEM City™ in which all business ventures focus on science, technology, engineering and math. Students learn urban planning, energy conservation, infrastructure innovations and resource management. While negotiating land deals and exploring the value of government regulations in the press, they sharpen oral and written communication skills.

Local business partners provide mentoring and the opportunity to transfer real world skills in MicroSociety programs. Community professionals support students in their work as government officials, business owners, museum curators, journalists and IRS agents.

MSI is positioned to meet the demands of the 21st century. Research on MicroSociety students consistently indicates significant academic gains, improved attendance, behavior and attitude toward school.
