= Anton J. Johnson =

American politician

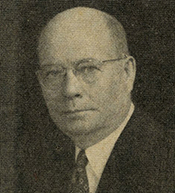

Member of the U.S. House of Representatives from Illinois's 14th district
- In office January 3, 1939 – January 3, 1949
- Preceded by: Chester C. Thompson
- Succeeded by: Chauncey W. Reed

Personal details
- Born: October 20, 1878 Peoria, Illinois
- Died: April 16, 1958 (aged 79) Macomb, Illinois
- Party: Republican

Anton Joseph Johnson (October 20, 1878 – April 16, 1958) was a U.S. representative from Illinois.

Born in Peoria, Illinois, to Swedish immigrant parents, Johnson attended the public schools and the School of Agriculture of the University of Missouri in Columbia, Missouri. He served as first sergeant, Fifth Infantry, Company G, Illinois National Guard from 1898 to 1901. He worked as a letter carrier in Peoria from 1900 to 1913. He engaged in agricultural pursuits near Peoria, Illinois, from 1913 to 1921. He engaged in dairy-products manufacturing in Macomb, Illinois, from 1926 to 1938. He served as president of the Illinois Milk Dealers' Association 1931–1936. He served as president of the Illinois Dairy Products Association in 1937.

Johnson was elected as a Republican to the Seventy-sixth and to the four succeeding Congresses (January 3, 1939 – January 3, 1949). He was not a candidate for renomination in 1948 to the Eighty-first Congress.

Johnson was elected mayor of Macomb, Illinois, in 1949 for a four-year term but resigned after serving two years. He died in Macomb, Illinois, on April 16, 1958. He was interred in Springdale Cemetery, Peoria, Illinois.

U.S. House of Representatives
Preceded by Chester C. Thompson	Member of the U.S. House of Representatives from Illinois's 14th congressional district 1939-1949	Succeeded by Chauncey W. Reed
