= Eileen Wilson-Oyelaran =

American educator and academic administrator

17th President of Kalamazoo College
- In office 2005–2016
- Preceded by: James F. Jones
- Succeeded by: Jorge Gonzalez

Personal details
- Born: November 14, 1947 (age 78)
- Spouse: Olasope Oyelaran
- Children: 4
- Education: Pomona College (BA); Claremont Graduate University (MA, PhD)

Eileen B. Wilson-Oyelaran (born November 14, 1947) is an educator and academic administrator who served as the 17th president of Kalamazoo College, succeeding James F. Jones. She was the first female president, as well as the first African-American president of the school. She retired at the end of the 2015–2016 academic year.

== Education ==
Wilson-Oyelaran grew up in Los Angeles. She enrolled at Pomona College east of the city, where she majored in sociology and was one of the founding members of the Claremont Colleges' Black Student Union. She then earned an M.A. and Ph.D. in education from the Claremont Graduate University. During her undergraduate study abroad experience in England, she studied the education of immigrant children. She was also the recipient of the Thomas J. Watson Traveling Fellowship, which enabled her to do independent research in Ghana, Nigeria, and Tanzania.

== Academic career ==
After completing her doctoral work in early childhood development, she accepted her first academic position at the University of Ife (now Obafemi Awolowo University) in Nigeria, teaching in both the departments of education and psychology. She stayed at Ife for 14 years, and served as a department chair and Vice-Dean of the Faculty of Social Sciences.

Wilson-Oyelaran's scholarly focus is in child development and education in cross-cultural context, and she has published widely in this area. While in Nigeria she served as a consultant for UNICEF (Nigeria) and designed a series of baseline surveys that became the model for assessing the status of children under five throughout the country.

In 1988, when her family left Nigeria for the United States, Wilson-Oyelaran became a visiting scholar in education at North Carolina Wesleyan College and then associate professor and chair of the department of education at Winston-Salem State University. In 1995, she became Dean of the College at Salem College, and rose to the position of Vice President of Salem Academy and College and Dean of the College. She was also acting president of Salem College for a brief period.

In 2013, Wilson-Oyelaran was named chair of the board of directors of the National Association of Independent Colleges and Universities (NAICU).

== Honors ==
Her honors and awards include the Kent Fellowship, American Council on Education Fellowship and the Visionary Leadership Award presented by the Claremont Colleges Intercollegiate Office of Black Studies. A proponent of equity and inclusion, Wilson-Oyelaran has been honored for her work on behalf of young women and girls. She is the recipient of the American Association of Colleges of Teacher Education (AACTE) Gender Equity Architect Award, the Salvation Army's Strong, Smart, and Bold Award, and the YWCA Woman of Vision. In 2007 Mortar Board National College Senior Honor Society presented her with the Alumni Achievement Award.

== Personal life ==
She is married to Olasope Oyelaran and they have raised four children: Adedoyin, Oyindasola, Omosalewa, and Oyeyinka.
