= Hinesburg (CDP), Vermont =

Census-designated place in Vermont, United States

Hinesburg, Vermont
- Census-designated place
- Location within Vermont Location within the United States
- Coordinates: 44°20′04″N 73°07′05″W
- Country: United States
- State: Vermont
- County: Chittenden
- Town: Hinesburg

Area
  - Total: 1.246 sq mi (3.226 km^{2})
  - Land: 1.244 sq mi (3.222 km^{2})
  - Water: 0.0015 sq mi (0.004 km^{2})
- Elevation: 341 ft (104 m)

Population (2020)
  - Total: 872
- Time zone: UTC-5 (Eastern (EST))
  - Summer (DST): UTC-4 (EDT)
- ZIP Code: 05461
- Area code: 802
- FIPS code: 50-33400
- GNIS feature ID: 2586640

Hinesburg is the primary village and a census-designated place (CDP) in the town of Hinesburg, Chittenden County, Vermont, United States. As of the 2020 census, it had a population of 872, out of 4,698 in the entire town of Hinesburg.

== Geography ==
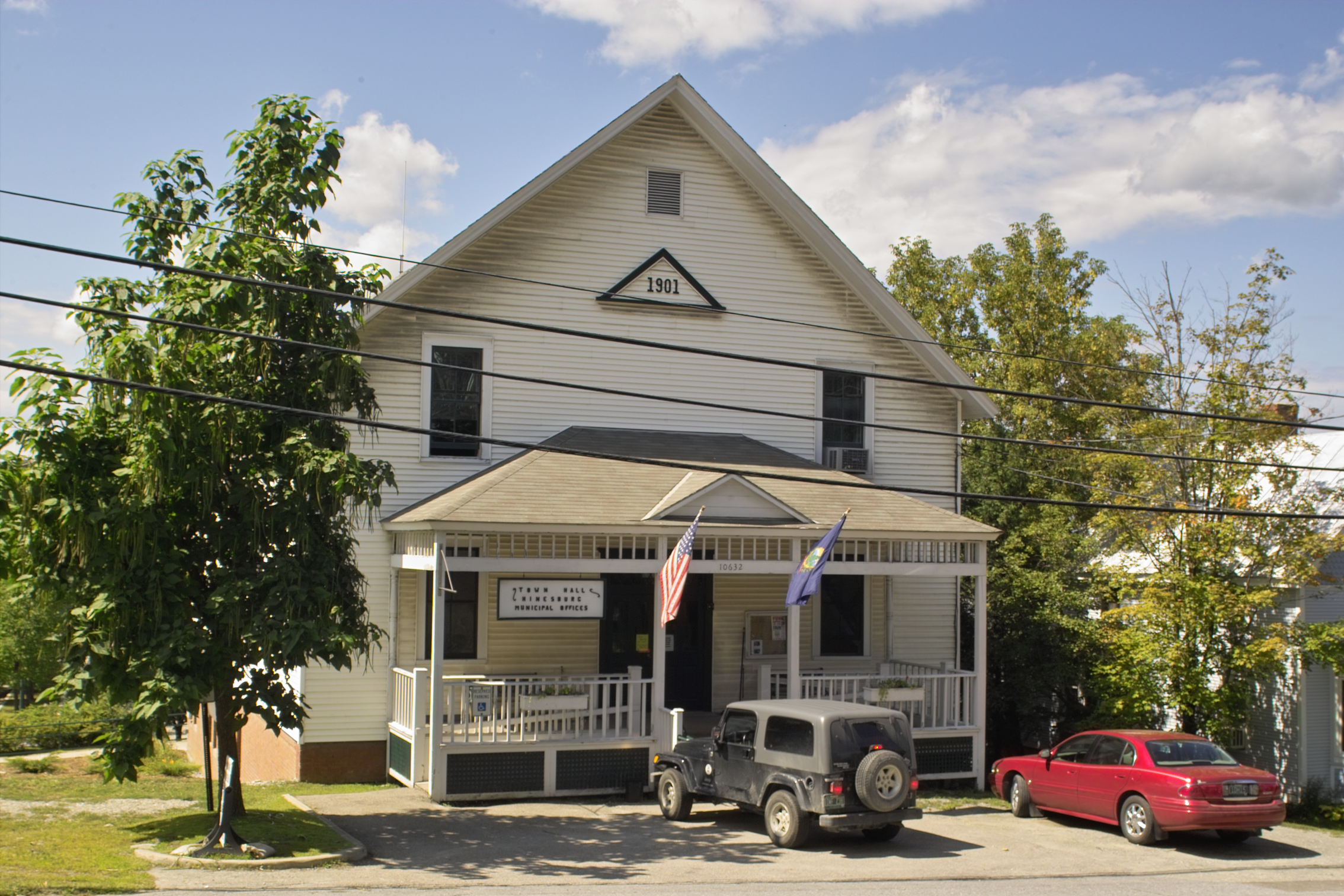
Town Hall in Hinesburg, Vermont

The village is in southern Chittenden County, slightly northwest of the center of the town of Hinesburg. It is in the valley of the La Platte River, which flows northwest to Lake Champlain in the town of Shelburne. Vermont Route 116 passes through the village, leading north 10 miles (16 km) to South Burlington and south 17 miles (27 km) to Bristol.
