= George H. Richmond =

American educator and painter

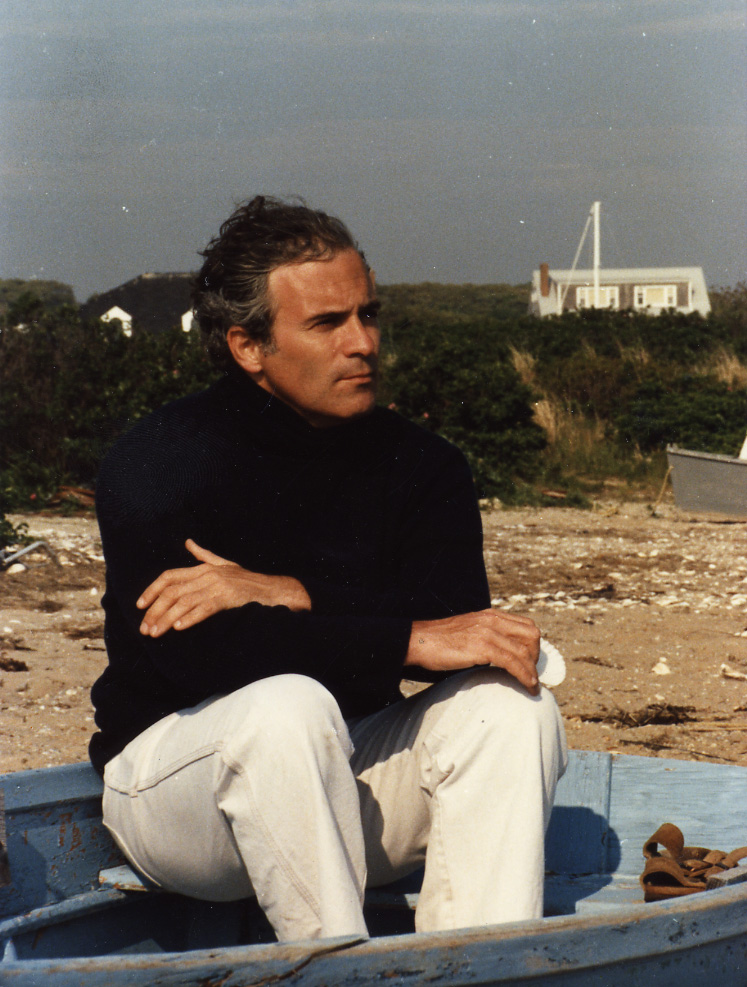
George Richmond

George H. Richmond (1944–2004) was an American educator who introduced the concept of the MicroSociety to American primary education.

Richmond was a painter as well as an educator. He was raised by a single mother in Manhattan's Lower East Side. He started teaching at a Brooklyn elementary school in 1967, and was a Yale graduate. As a rookie teacher, he coined the term "microsociety," and created the first microsociety in his classroom in 1967 to combat students' lack of interest in the learning curriculum. A microsociety learning environment enables students to apply classroom knowledge to real world settings, for example, starting a business, making laws, and paying bills, etc. Richmond was invited to attend Harvard for his doctorate. His thesis, The MicroSociety School: A Real World in Miniature was published by Harpers & Row in 1973.

In 1984, Richmond met his wife Carolynn King, a Harvard and Villanova graduate with advanced degrees in education and law. She researched and found microsocieties were operating in various schools across the country. Richmond and King continued to develop the model and sought grant opportunities to support their efforts. George Richmond fell ill with Parkinson's disease. Carolynn King Richmond left her law practice to run The MicroSociety School Consortium in 1991, and together they wrote and published the 500 page MicroSociety Handbook.

George Richmond continued to write and paint despite the progression of Parkinson's Disease, and in 2004 published a collection of poetry illustrated with his paintings, entitled, The Economics of Love. In 2004 George Richmond died of complications from cancer.
