= Mary Randolph Carter =

American author, photographer, and collector

Mary Randolph Carter is an American author, photographer, and collector. She was formerly the creative director for Ralph Lauren in New York City. She is known for writing about the aesthetic of homely clutter. Early in her career, she was Guest Editor at Mademoiselle Magazine. There, she helped to pioneer lifestyle segments that focused on features of real women. She went on to work for Self Magazine and later Ralph Lauren. Like Ralph Lauren, Mary Randolph Carter had no formal fashion training. She became known for her original style and eclectic design sensibility, which for interiors is rooted in embracing what she calls "the poetry of our homes," namely the meaningful objects of daily life.

== Personal life ==
Mary Randolph Carter was born in Richmond, Virginia in 1945, the eldest of nine children. She is married to advertiser Howard Berg. As a child, she lived through two house fires, which influenced her relationship to objects as a designer and collector.

== Books ==
- American Junk ISBN 0670844004 and ISBN 9780670844005
- Garden Junk ISBN 0670869384 and ISBN 9780670869381
- Kitchen Junk ISBN 067088099X and ISBN 9780670880997
- Big City Junk ISBN 060960712X and ISBN 9780609607121
- The Joy of Junk ISBN 0847862100 and ISBN 9780847862108
