= Mary Adaline Carter =

American industrial art instructor and designer

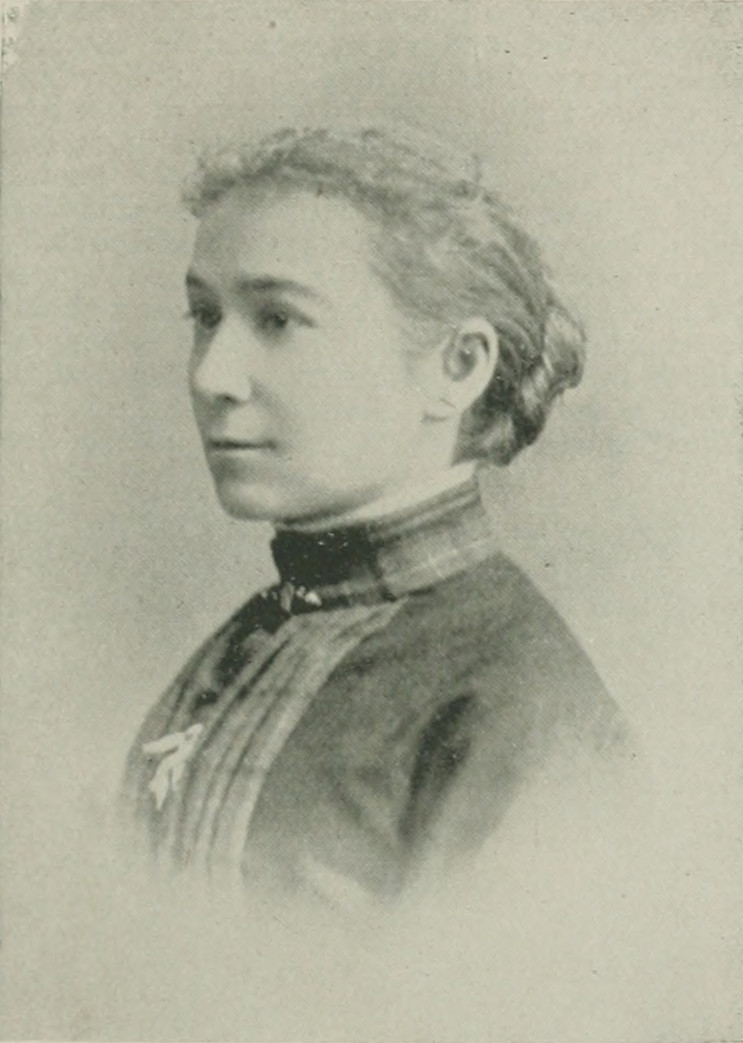
Mary Adaline Carter

Mary Adaline Carter was an American industrial art instructor and designer from the U.S. state of Vermont.

== Early years and education ==
Mary Adaline Carter was born in Hinesburg, Vermont. She was the oldest child of Edward H. and Mary Adaline Kellogg Carter. Her parents were natives of Vermont, descended from the early New England settlers, of English and Scotch origin. Her early education was chiefly from nature and object study. At the age of eight, she attended private and public schools in Burlington, Vermont, and in Vineland, New Jersey, where her family removed in 1866. The years of country life spent in South Jersey during her youth were filled with formative influences that laid a broad and sound basis for her lifework.

Circumstances and environments led Carter to finding occupations for herself, or to having them given her, that promoted inventive and executive powers and stimulated love for science and art. Thirst for larger opportunities and higher education developed, but adversities came, overwork, intense mental strain, then long and severe illness. After health was restored, she was by degrees led to industrial art as her vocation. Though beset by obstacles that would have turned aside one of less resoluteness, her course was progressive and largely successful. With simply the intention of becoming proficient as a teacher of drawing, she entered the Woman's Art School, Cooper Union, New York City.

== Career ==
After graduating with highest honors, in 1876, her services were immediately required as a designer for embroidery. While thus engaged, part of her time was still devoted to art study, and throughout her years of working, she was a constant student in art and other educational subjects.

In the Centennial Exhibition, in 1876, she made a special study of the needlework, art embroideries and textiles of all countries. Not long after, her watercolor studies from nature attracted the notice of John Bennett (1840–1907), the English painter of art-pottery, and she became his pupil and assistant. In 1879, a number of pieces of faience decorated by her were sent by invitation to the exhibition of Howell James & Co., London, England. One of her vases was presented to Sir Frederic Leighton, president of the Royal Academy, and others were sold to art museums in England, to be kept as examples of American art pottery. The same year, some of her work in faience was shown in New York, and won much praise.

When the Associated Artists began their united enterprise which did much in revolutionizing and elevating household taste and interior decoration of American home and public buildings, Carter's services were secured by Louis Tiffany, and she was connected with them several years. At first having to do with all the kinds of work undertaken, glass, mosaics, metals, wood, embroideries, hangings, wall and ceiling coverings, painting or anything else decoratively used in buildings, she was the first woman thus employed. Later, having developed marked ability in plastic art, she had special charge of their pottery and modeling department. Her ornamental relief-work, panels and friezes were often used with heads and figures by Augustus Saint-Gaudens, and combined with work by Charles Caryl Coleman, Maitland Armstrong and other well known artists in the decoration of public and private buildings in New York and different parts of the country. Her designs for memorial and other windows, for decoration of interiors and for different purposes were used in churches and homes, on both east and west coasts.

=== Instructor ===
Frequently, artists, draughtsmen, teachers and others sought instruction from her in special subjects. At different times, she taught classes of children in drawing, and in the Woman's Art School one in porcelain painting. Since 1886, she was instructor of the free classes in clay-modeling, applied design and normal training in form-study and drawing for the Young Women's Christian Association of New York. The courses of study in those classes and all accessories were planned and carried out by her.

== Personal life ==
From about 1880, Carter resided with her family in the upper suburban part of New York City. She was a staunch member of the Woman's Christian Temperance Union.
