= James Stone (academic administrator) =

James Andrus Blinn Stone
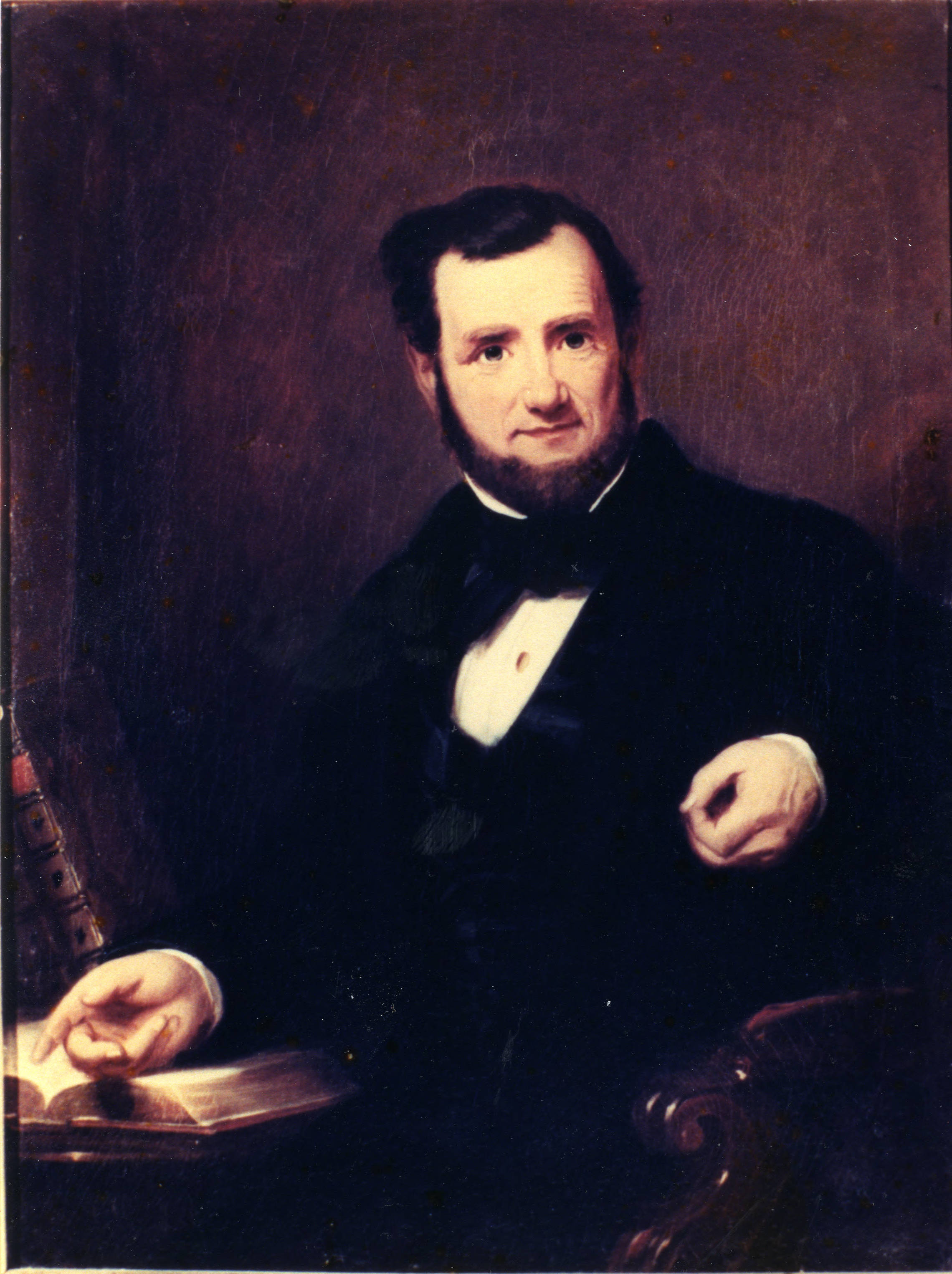
- Born: October 28, 1810; Piermont, New Hampshire
- Died: May 19, 1888 (aged 77); Detroit, Michigan
- Education: Middlebury College, Andover Theological Seminary
- Occupation(s): Minister, professor, college president
- Known for: First president of Kalamazoo College

James Andrus Blinn Stone (1810–1888) was a minister, professor, and school administrator. He was the first president of the Kalamazoo College. His wife, Lucinda Hinsdale Stone, was a partner and administrator at the school. He helped establish the Republican Party.

== Biography ==
James Andrus B Stone was born on October 28, 1810, in Piermont, New Hampshire. He was educated at the local district school and a college preparatory school in Royalton, Vermont. He graduated with honors from Middlebury College in 1834. After graduation, he was a tutor at Middlebury, and was then a principal at Hinesbury Academy. He attended Andover Theological Seminary for three years. He then was a minister at Gloucester, Massachusetts. He taught at the Newton Theological Institution.

Stone led the school that became Kalamazoo College from 1842 through 1863. Stone was responsible for institution of high academic standards that allowed the college to receive its charter in 1855 and secured the support of the Baptists to establish the college. He became the first president about 1860.

In 1843, Stone married Lucinda Hinsdale after he moved to Michigan. She was the first principal of the Ladies Department at the Kalamazoo Branch of the University of Michigan, which became Kalamazoo College. Both administrators, the Stones introduced coeducation. They also promoted women's rights and abolitionism.

Stone also played a role in the creation of the United States Republican Party. A meeting of disgruntled Michigan Whigs, Democrats, and abolitionists at the Stones' Kalamazoo residence set the date for an anti-slavery convention in Jackson, Michigan that resulted in one of the formal births of the Republican Party.

Stone died on May 19, 1888, in Detroit, Michigan, during a visit to his son James H. Stone.

== Bibliography ==
- Perry, Belle McArthur (1902). Lucinda Hinsdale Stone, Her Life Story and Reminiscences. Blinn Publishing Company.
