= Mary Elizabeth Carter =

English writer

- Born: August 1852; Masham, North Yorkshire, England
- Died: 6 June 1928; Beaminster, Dorset, England

Mary Elizabeth Carter (August 1852 – 6 June, 1928) was an English author of at least nine books, including romantic novels and non-fiction on household management.

She was born in Masham, North Yorkshire, England to parents Thomas and Elizabeth Carter. Her father was a silk merchant and magistrate. Mary was the eldest of five siblings (Annie, Elisabeth, Gertrude, and Charles Carter). In her thirties she married farmer Peter Stevenson, who was sixteen years her senior and was brother to toxicologist Thomas Stevenson.

Carter wrote several romance novels published by Richard Bentley and Son 1883 to 1893. In 1903 and 1904, she published two books via New York publishers that pivoted to non-fiction commentary and advice on household management, including on the inequities faced by domestic workers in wealthy households.

Carter was friends with the sister Ellen of novelist George Gissing (1857–1903) and kept correspondence with them both. In 1912, selections of her letters with George Gissing were published in T.P. Weekly. She died in Beaminster, Dorset, England on June 6, 1928.
