= Jim Stone (rugby union) =

- Full name: James Martin Stone
- Born: 15 April 1921 Coonamble, NSW, Australia
- Died: 4 September 2010 (aged 89)

Rugby union career
- Position: Wing
International career
| Years | Team | Apps | (Points) |
| 1946 | Australia | 2 | (0) |

James Martin Stone (15 April 1921 — 4 September 2010) was an Australian rugby union international.

Stone was born in Coonamble and attended De La Salle College Armidale.

A winger, Stone was a prolific try scorer and made an immediate impact in his debut first-grade season for Randwick in 1941, with 21 tries from 15 appearances, which included a record run of 14 successive games where he scored a try.

Stone served in the Army during the war and towards the end of the conflict was based on Morotai Island.

After the war, Stone began playing for St. George and didn't have to wait long to receive a Wallabies call up, when he was named for the 1946 tour of New Zealand. He missed the 1st Test against New Zealand with a torn leg muscle, but recovered in time for the match against NZ Maori, which was retrospectively awarded Test status to become his first Wallabies cap. He was capped again in the 2nd Test at Eden Park against the All Blacks.

== See also ==
- List of Australia national rugby union players
