= Hinesburg, Vermont =

- Town
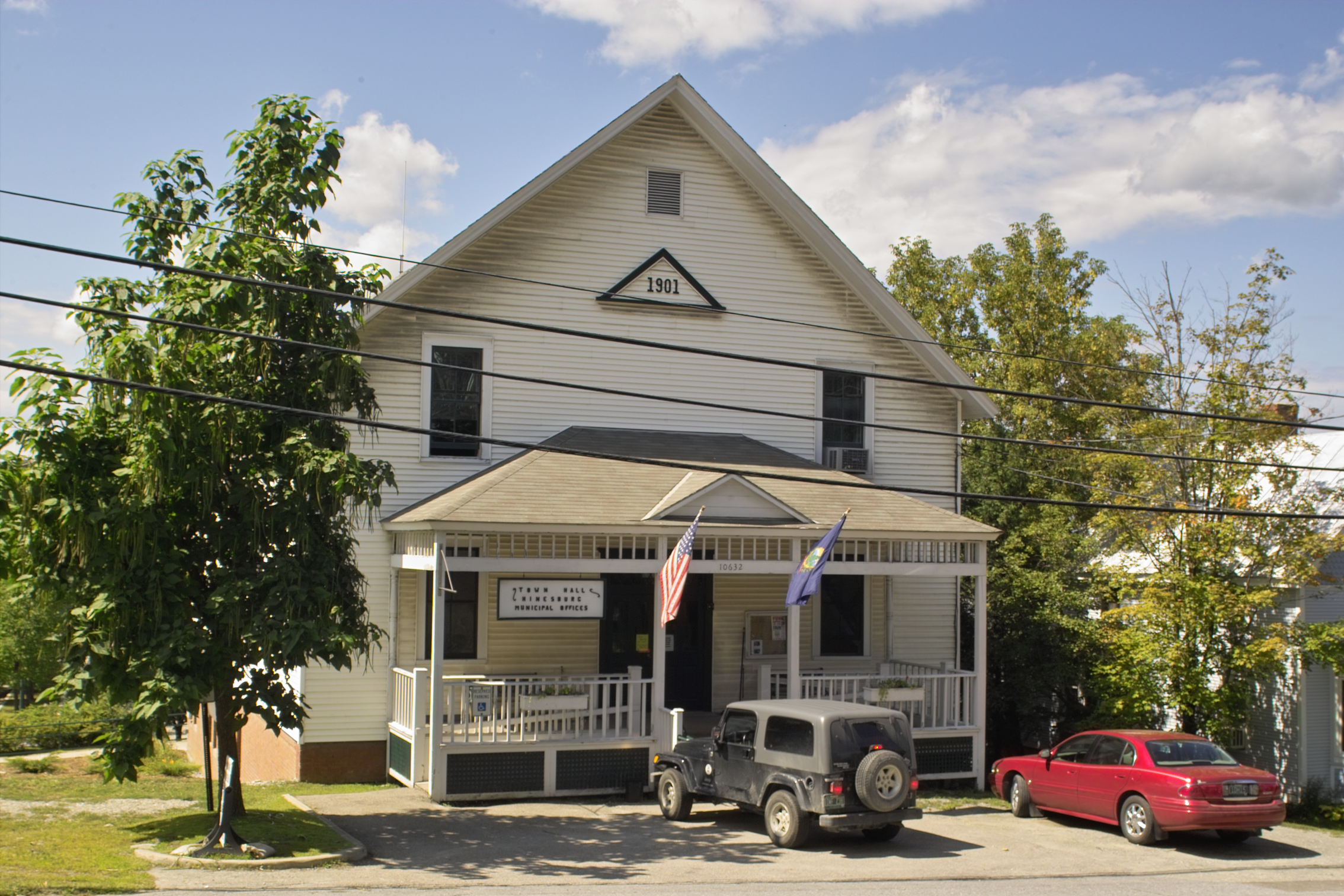
- Hinesburg town hall

- Seal

- Location in Chittenden County and the state of Vermont
- Coordinates: 44°19′27″N 73°07′10″W
- Country: United States
- State: Vermont
- County: Chittenden
- Communities: Hinesburg; Mechanicsville; Rhode Island Corner; South Hinesburg

Area
  - Total: 39.8 sq mi (103.2 km^{2})
  - Land: 39.4 sq mi (102.1 km^{2})
  - Water: 0.39 sq mi (1.0 km^{2})
- Elevation: 532 ft (162 m)

Population (2020)
  - Total: 4,698
  - Density: 120/sq mi (46/km^{2})
- Time zone: UTC-5 (Eastern (EST))
  - Summer (DST): UTC-4 (EDT)
- ZIP code: 05461
- Area code: 802
- FIPS code: 50-33475
- GNIS feature ID: 1462119
- Website: www.hinesburg.org

Hinesburg is a town in Chittenden County, Vermont, United States. The town was named for Abel Hine, town clerk. The population was 4,698 at the 2020 census.

The main settlement of Hinesburg in the center of town is a census-designated place (CDP), with a population of 872 at the 2020 census.

== Geography ==
Hinesburg is located in southern Chittenden County, bordered by Addison County to the south. According to the United States Census Bureau, the town has a total area of 39.8 square miles (103.2 km^{2}), of which 39.4 square miles (102.1 km^{2}) is land and 0.39 square miles (1.0 km^{2}), or 1.00%, is water.

The main settlement of Hinesburg is located near the geographic center of town along Vermont Route 116 in the valley of the La Platte River. VT 116 leads north 11 miles (18 km) to South Burlington and south 17 miles (27 km) to Bristol.

== Schools and libraries ==
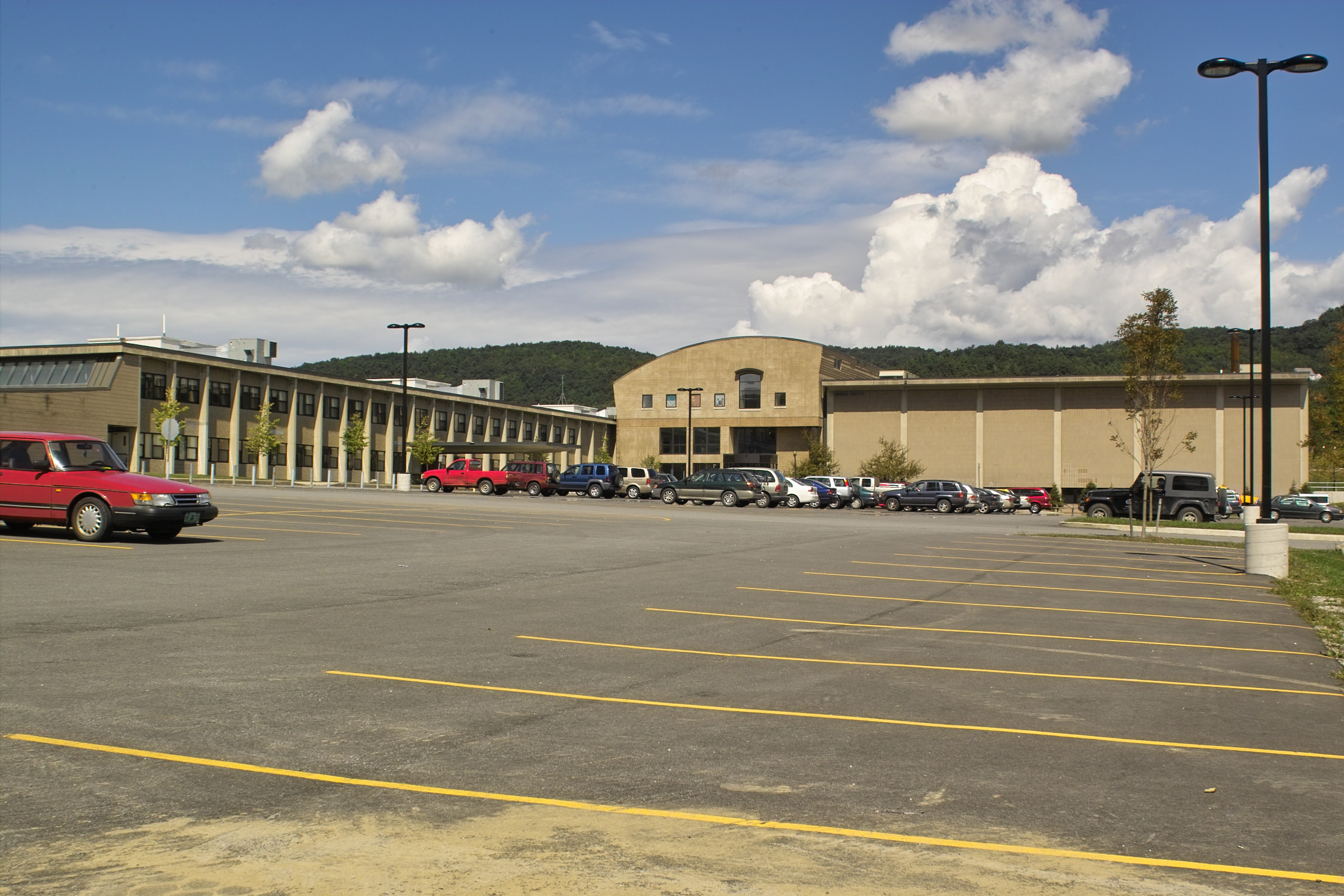
Champlain Valley Union High School

- Hinesburg Community School
- Champlain Valley Union High School, which services Hinesburg and many surrounding towns.
- Carpenter Carse Library

== Notable events ==
In April 1985, 29 teachers at Hinesburg Elementary School went on strike for two weeks following a salary dispute. The strike was described by The New York Times as "the longest, most bitter teachers' strike in Vermont history".

On the night of September 29, 2008, the Saputo cheese factory caught fire. The fire department billed the local Saputo cheese plant $500,000 for firefighting gear ruined in fighting the fire. Their destruction was caused by hazardous cleaning chemicals stored at the plant. It was announced in October that the cheese factory would be closed. The factory was the town's third largest employer.

== Demographics ==
Historical population
Census	Pop.	Note	%±
1790	454		—
1800	933		105.5%
1810	1,238		32.7%
1820	1,332		7.6%
1830	1,669		25.3%
1840	1,682		0.8%
1850	1,834		9.0%
1860	1,702		−7.2%
1870	1,573		−7.6%
1880	1,330		−15.4%
1890	1,205		−9.4%
1900	1,216		0.9%
1910	1,042		−14.3%
1920	964		−7.5%
1930	1,019		5.7%
1940	1,000		−1.9%
1950	1,120		12.0%
1960	1,180		5.4%
1970	1,775		50.4%
1980	2,690		51.5%
1990	3,780		40.5%
2000	4,340		14.8%
2010	4,396		1.3%
2020	4,698		6.9%
U.S. Decennial Census

As of the census of 2000, there were 4,340 people, 1,596 households, and 1,174 families residing in the town. The population density was 109.0 people per square mile (42.1/km^{2}). There were 1,693 housing units at an average density of 42.5 per square mile (16.4/km^{2}). The racial makeup of the town was 97.90% White, 0.14% African American, 0.21% Native American, 0.51% Asian, 0.02% Pacific Islander, 0.16% from other races, and 1.06% from two or more races. Hispanic or Latino of any race were 0.78% of the population.

There were 1,596 households, out of which 40.8% had children under the age of 18 living with them, 61.8% were couples living together and joined in either marriage or civil union, 6.9% had a female householder with no husband present, and 26.4% were non-families. 17.0% of all households were made up of individuals, and 4.3% had someone living alone who was 65 years of age or older. The average household size was 2.72 and the average family size was 3.09.

In the town, the population was spread out, with 28.9% under the age of 18, 5.8% from 18 to 24, 36.5% from 25 to 44, 23.4% from 45 to 64, and 5.5% who were 65 years of age or older. The median age was 35 years. For every 100 females, there were 99.4 males. For every 100 females age 18 and over, there were 95.4 males.

The median income for a household in the town was $49,788, and the median income for a family was $54,836. Males had a median income of $40,000 versus $24,107 for females. The per capita income for the town was $22,230. About 2.3% of families and 3.5% of the population were below the poverty line, including 4.4% of those under age 18 and 3.5% of those age 65 or over.

== Notable people ==
- John Clayton Allen, US congressman from Illinois
- Lisa Alther, novelist
- Leverett Baldwin, Illinois state representative
- Mary Adaline Edwarda Carter, artist
- Jeff Dinitz, mathematician
- William C. Hill (1917–1998), Associate Justice of the Vermont Supreme Court
- William Alanson Howard, US congressman from Michigan; governor of Dakota Territory
- Bill Lippert, Vermont state representative
- Charles D. McEwen, Minnesota state representative
- William Lamb Picknell, painter; known for his rapid painting style
- Ossian Ray, US congressman from New Hampshire
- Heman R. Smith, Adjutant General of the Vermont Militia
- Lucinda Hinsdale Stone, early American feminist, educator, traveler, writer, and philanthropist
- David Zuckerman, Lieutenant Governor of Vermont
