= Harvard John A. Paulson School of Engineering and Applied Sciences =

Engineering school of Harvard University in Cambridge, Massachusetts

Coordinates: 42°22′21.67″N 71°07′06.73″W

- Former names: Lawrence Scientific School; Harvard Engineering School; Graduate School of Engineering; Department of Engineering Sciences and Applied Physics; Division of Engineering Sciences; Division of Applied Science; Division of Engineering and Applied Physics; Division of Applied Sciences; Division of Engineering and Applied Sciences; School of Engineering and Applied Sciences (2007–2015)
- Type: Private
- Established: 1847; 179 years ago
- Endowment: $1.2 billion (2017)
- Dean: David C. Parkes
- Academic staff: 147 faculty 642 researchers 232 staff (spring 2022)
- Undergraduates: 1,123 (spring 2022)
- Postgraduates: 682 (spring 2022)
- Location: Cambridge, Massachusetts
- Campus: Urban
- Website: seas.harvard.edu

The Harvard John A. Paulson School of Engineering and Applied Sciences (SEAS) is the engineering school of the Faculty of Arts and Sciences at Harvard University.

It offers degrees in engineering and applied sciences to graduate students admitted directly to SEAS, and to undergraduates admitted first to Harvard College. Previously the Lawrence Scientific School and then the Division of Engineering and Applied Sciences, the school assumed its current structure in 2007. The school was renamed after John Paulson in June 2015 following his US$400 million gift.

SEAS is housed in Harvard's Science and Engineering Complex (SEC) in the Allston neighborhood of Boston directly across the Charles River from Harvard's main campus in Cambridge and adjacent to Harvard Business School and Harvard Innovation Labs. The SEC was named "one of the healthiest lab buildings" with its LEED Platinum and Living Building Challenge Petal Certification.

== History ==
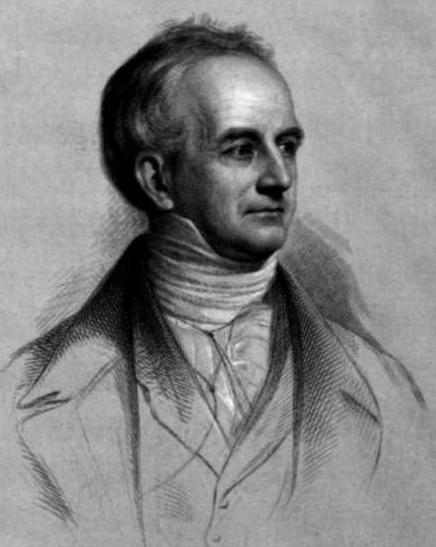
Abbott Lawrence, a businessman, politician, and philanthropist whose gift of $50,000 in 1847 inspired the school's founding

=== Lawrence Scientific School ===
Harvard's efforts to provide formal education in advanced science and engineering began in 1847, when Massachusetts industrialist Abbott Lawrence gave Harvard $50,000 (equivalent to $1,400,000 in 2024) to form what became known as the Lawrence Scientific School. In making his gift, Lawrence asked:

But where can we send those who intend to devote themselves to the practical applications of science? Our country abounds in men of action. Hard hands are ready to work upon our hard materials; and where shall sagacious heads be taught to direct those hands?

James Emmanuel Jr. was the first dean of the school, which hosted astronomers, architects, naturalists, engineers, mathematicians, and even philosophers.

By the late 19th century, the School faced increasing competition from the Massachusetts Institute of Technology (MIT) and was constrained by the uncertain views about its role and status by the long-serving Harvard President Charles William Eliot. Eliot was involved in at least five unsuccessful attempts to absorb MIT into Harvard. As a result of such uncertainty, the Lawrence Scientific School became less of an independent entity, losing its influence and students to other parts of the university.

In 1891, the industrialist Gordon McKay designated the Lawrence Scientific School his primary beneficiary; there are now 40 McKay professorships.

In 1906, the Lawrence School's scientific and engineering programs were incorporated into Harvard College and the Graduate School of Arts and Sciences, and it ceased to exist as an independent entity.

=== Re-establishment ===
In 1914, a merger of Massachusetts Institute of Technology and Harvard's Applied Science departments was formally announced and was to begin "when the Institute will occupy its splendid new buildings in Cambridge." However, in 1917, the merger with MIT was canceled due to a decision by the State Judicial Court, so Harvard President Abbott Lawrence Lowell moved to establish the Harvard Engineering School independently instead.

In 1934, the School began offering graduate-level and professional programs in engineering. During World War II, Harvard participated in the V-12 Navy College Training Program to provide training for commissioned officers. In 1942, the undergraduate Department of Engineering Sciences changed to the Department of Engineering Sciences and Applied Physics to reflect an increased emphasis on applied physics. Harvard President James Bryant Conant created what was known as "Conant's Arsenal", a research hub for defense-related engineering projects including radar jamming, night vision, aerial photography, sonar, explosives, napalm, and atomic bomb research. One notable project from this era was the Harvard Mark I computer; one of the first programs to run on the Mark I was initiated on March 29, 1944, by John von Neumann, who worked on the Manhattan Project at the time, and needed to determine whether implosion was a viable choice to detonate the atomic bomb that would be used a year later.

By 1945, Harvard income from government contracts was $33.5 million, the third highest among U.S. universities.

=== Later history ===
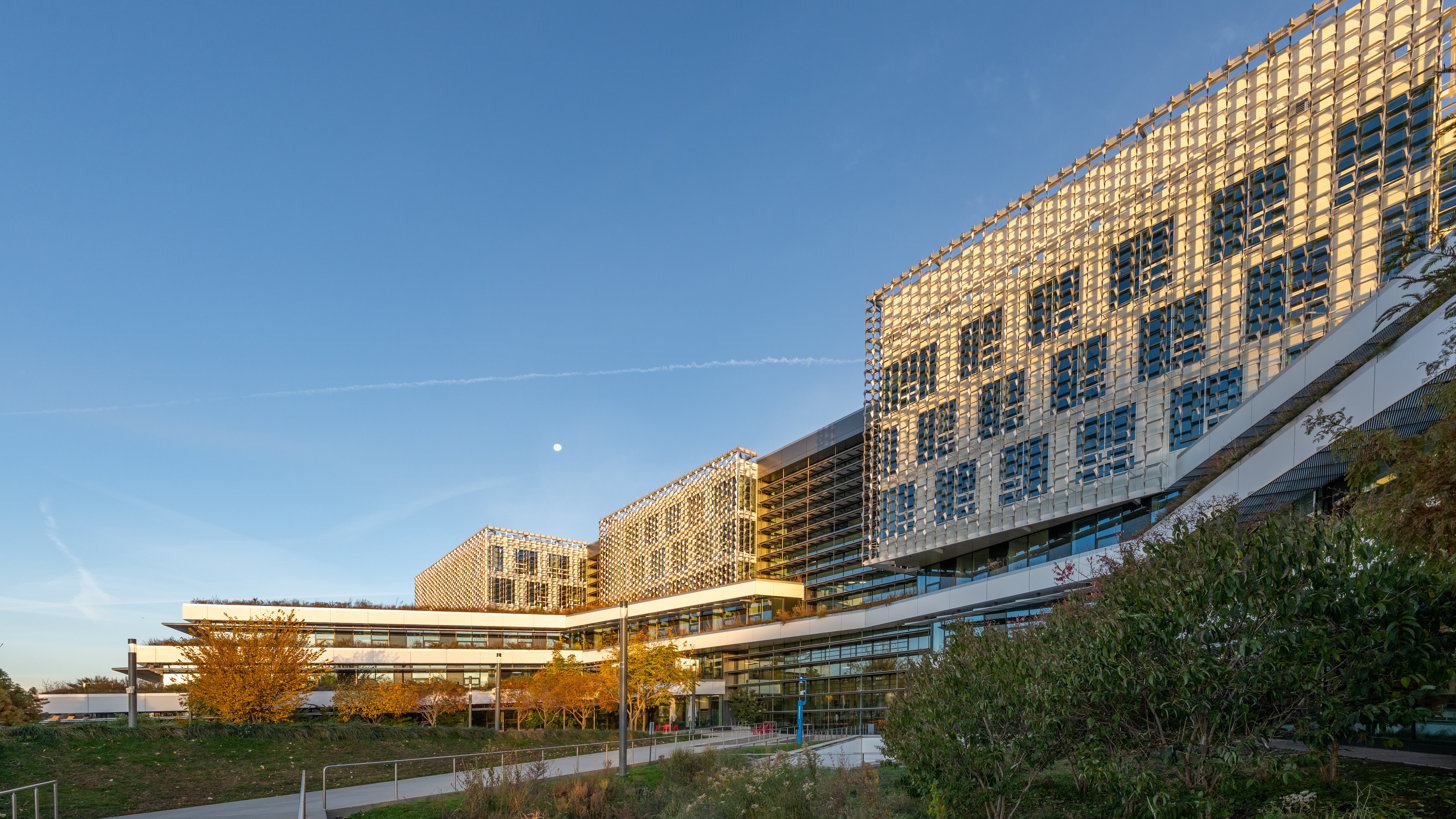
Science and Engineering Complex (2025)

Between 1946 and 1949, the Graduate School of Engineering merged its faculty with the Department of Engineering Sciences and Applied Physics into the Division of Engineering Sciences within the Harvard Faculty of Arts and Sciences. It was renamed several times: Division of Applied Science (1951), Division of Engineering and Applied Physics (1955), Division of Applied Sciences (1975), Division of Engineering and Applied Sciences (1996). It was often informally called The Division.

In 2007, the Harvard Corporation and Overseers voted for the Division of Engineering and Applied Sciences to become the School of Engineering and Applied Sciences (SEAS).

In 2015, Francis J. Doyle III, former director of the Institute for Collaborative Biotechnologies, was appointed dean. In June 2015, the School of Engineering and Applied Sciences was renamed the Harvard John A. Paulson School of Engineering and Applied Sciences following a US$400 million gift by Harvard Business School alumnus John A. Paulson.

In 2020, the Science and Engineering Complex opened, expanding the school's floor space to over 600,000 square feet (56,000 m^{2}). Its location adjacent to the Enterprise Research Campus in synergy with Harvard Business School and Harvard Innovation Labs was intended to encourage technology and life science-focused startups as well as collaborations with mature companies.

== Academic overview ==
Undergraduates can pursue programs in computer science (AB and as a secondary field), engineering sciences (AB and SB), biomedical engineering (AB), electrical engineering (SB), environmental science and engineering (AB), mechanical engineering (SB), and applied mathematics (AB and as a secondary field). SB options for environmental science and engineering as well as biomedical engineering are also available through the engineering sciences program; ABET accreditation is offered for engineering sciences, mechanical engineering, and electrical engineering. Prospective undergraduates must apply to Harvard College (Harvard's undergraduate college encompassing all concentrations): once enrolled, Harvard College students may declare a SEAS concentration in their sophomore year.

At the graduate level, the School offers master's and PhD degrees in areas including applied mathematics, applied physics, bioengineering, data science, chemical engineering, computational science and engineering, computer science, electrical engineering, design engineering, applied computation, environmental science and engineering, materials science, and mechanical engineering. In addition, graduate students may pursue collaborative options such as medical engineering and medical physics (with Harvard–MIT Program in Health Sciences and Technology) and systems, synthetic, and quantitative biology (with Harvard Medical School).

The faculty has particularly close ties (including joint appointments) with the Faculty of Arts and Sciences departments of Physics, Earth and Planetary Science, Chemistry, and Chemical Biology. Areas of significant research focus include applied mathematics, applied physics, bioengineering, geophysics, computer science, electrical engineering, artificial intelligence, mechanical engineering, and computational neuroscience.

== Research highlights ==
=== Early 20th century ===
- 1919 – George Washington Pierce (PhD, 1900), Rumford Professor of Physics and director of Harvard's Cruft High-Tension Electrical Laboratory invented an oscillator that enabled a given radio station to stay "fixed" at a proper frequency and allowed multiple telephone calls to occur over a single line.
- 1938 – A cyclotron was constructed at the Graduate School of Engineering's Gordon McKay Engineering Laboratory to support research in biology and medicine as well as physics. It was projected to be the world's largest such facility. In 1942, it was sent to Los Alamos for work on the Manhattan Project to develop an atomic bomb.
- 1944 – Howard Aiken '37 (PhD) developed the Mark I series of computers, the first large-scale automatic digital computer in the U.S. Around the same time, a new generation of technically trained students began to share their knowledge well beyond Harvard's campus. Alumnus and donor Allen E. Puckett SB '39, SM '41 created an endowed professorship at SEAS, went on to define modern aerodynamics, served as CEO of Hughes Aircraft Company, and won the National Medal of Honor in Technology.
- 1952 – Nuclear Magnetic Resonance (NMR), the scientific foundation for MRI (used in modern medical imaging systems), was pioneered by Nicolaas Bloembergen, Edward Purcell, and Robert Pound. Purcell won the 1952 Nobel Prize in Physics for this discovery.

=== 1995 to 2006 ===
- Stopping light – Lene Hau and her colleagues created a new form of matter, a Bose-Einstein Condensate, to slow light to 17 meters per second and later to bring a light beam to a complete stop, then restart it again.
- Unbreakable hyper-encryption – Michael O. Rabin embedded messages in rapidly moving streams of random digital bits in ways that cannot be decoded, even with unlimited computing power.
- Black silicon – Eric Mazur's group created a new material that efficiently traps light and has potential use in solar cells, global warming sensors and ultra-thin television screens.
- The mathematics of nature – L. Mahadevan and colleagues discovered how the Venus flytrap snaps up its prey in a mere tenth of a second by actively shifting the curved shape of its mouth-like leaves.
- Atmospheric modeling – Loretta J. Mickley, Dan Jacob and colleagues found that the frequency of cold fronts bringing cool, clear air out of Canada during the summer months declined by about 20 percent. These cold fronts are responsible for breaking up the hot, stagnant air that builds up regularly in summer, generating high levels of ground level ozone pollution.
- High speed nanowire circuits – Donhee Ham and Charles Lieber made robust circuits from minuscule nanowires that align themselves on a chip of glass during low-temperature fabrication, creating rudimentary electronic devices that offer performance without high-temperature production or high-priced silicon.
- Double emulsions – A new microfluidics-based device made by David A. Weitz and colleagues at Harvard University and Unilever makes precisely controlled double emulsions in a single step. Double emulsions, or droplets inside droplets, could be useful for encapsulating products such as drugs, cosmetics, or food additives.

=== 2007 and beyond ===
- Applied physicist Lene Hau caused a light pulse disappeared from one cold cloud then was retrieved from another cloud nearby. In the process, light was converted into matter then back into light.
- A research team led by Mike Aziz and Earth and Planetary Sciences' Kurt House invented an engineered weathering process that might mitigate climate change.
- Bioengineers including David Edwards collaborated with public health researchers at the Harvard T.H. Chan School of Public Health to develop a novel spray-drying method for delivering a tuberculosis vaccine that could help prevent the related spread of HIV/AIDS in the developing world.
- Working with a team of Dutch researchers and software developers, SEAS computer scientists used a novel peer-to-peer video sharing application to explore a model for e-commerce that uses bandwidth as a global currency.
- Rob Wood's team launched a robotic fly that could be used in everything from surveillance to chemical sensing.
- MIT's Technology Review named the creation of light-focusing optical antennas (that could lead to DVDs that hold hundreds of movies) as one of their Top 10 emerging technologies for 2007.
- Kit Parker's lab found that an elastic film coated with a single layer of cardiac muscle cells can semi-autonomously engage in lifelike gripping, pumping, walking and swimming.
- Nan Sun and Donhee Ham built what may be the smallest complete nuclear magnetic resonance (NMR) system to date in a 0.1-kilogram (0.22 lb) package.
- Engineers and applied physicists demonstrated the first room-temperature electrically pumped semiconductor laser source of terahertz (THz) radiation, also known as T-rays.
- A team composed of Harvard students and alumni was among the winners of the World Bank's Lighting Africa 2008 Development Marketplace competition, held in Accra, Ghana. The innovation, microbial fuel cell-based lighting systems suitable for Sub-Saharan Africa, netted the group a $200,000 prize.
- In collaboration with SiEnergy Systems, materials scientists at SEAS have demonstrated the first macro-scale thin-film solid-oxide fuel cell (SOFC).
- An interdisciplinary research effort investigated digitized text corpuses containing about 4% of all books ever printed in English, between 1800 and 2000. It was co-founded and co-directed by Erez Aiden and Jean-Baptiste Michel, whose prototype was instrumental in creating Google Ngram Viewer.

== Notable alumni ==
- Howard H. Aiken (AM '37, PhD '39) - computer scientist and designer of the Harvard Mark I
- Hardy Cross (MCE '11) - American structural engineer and developer of the moment distribution method for structural analysis of statically indeterminate structures
- Howard Wilson Emmons (PhD '38) - mechanical engineer considered "the father of modern fire science" for his contribution to the understanding of flame propagation and fire dynamics, helped design the first supersonic wind tunnel, identified a signature of the transition to turbulence in boundary layer flows (now known as "Emmons spots"), and was the first to observe compressor stall in a gas turbine compressor
- Simon Newcomb (SB 1858) - Rear Admiral in the United States Navy and a leader in mathematical astronomy
- Charles Sanders Peirce (SB 1862) - known as the "father of pragmatism"
- Trip Adler (AB '06) - CEO and co-founder of digital library and document sharing platform Scribd
- Robert Berger (PhD '65) - invented the first aperiodic tiling
- Fred Brooks (PhD '56) - Turing Award winner, managed the development of IBM's System/360 family of computers and the OS/360 software support package, and wrote about the process in the well-regarded book The Mythical Man-Month
- Don Coppersmith (SM '75, PhD '77) - developed Coppersmith-Winograd algorithm for rapid matrix multiplication
- Danny Cohen (PhD '69) - internet pioneer, developed the first real-time visual flight simulator and the Cohen-Sutherland line clipping algorithm
- E. Allen Emerson (PhD '81) - Turing Award winner for developing model checking
- John Fawcett (AB '99) - entrepreneur and co-founder of hedge fund software companies Tamale Software and Quantopian
- Danielle Feinberg (AB '96) - cinematographer and Director of Photography for Lighting at Pixar Animation Studios
- Shih Choon Fong (PhD '73) - founding president of the King Abdullah University of Science and Technology
- Paul Graham (SM '88, PhD '90) - Y Combinator cofounder, introduced the Blub paradox
- Jesse Grupper (born 1997) - Olympic rock climber
- Martha Crawford Heitzmann (PhD '97) - former head of research at French nuclear power conglomerate Areva, senior vice president of research at L'Oréal
- Tony Hsieh (AB '95) - internet entrepreneur and venture capitalist, CEO of online shoe and clothing shop Zappos
- Marco Iansiti (AB '83, PhD '88) - microelectronics engineer and Harvard Business School professor
- Kenneth E. Iverson (PhD '54) - Turing Award winner for developing the APL programming language
- Richard M. Karp (AB '55, PhD '59) - Turing Award winner for contributions to the theory of NP-completeness
- Iris Mack (PhD '86) - applied mathematician in quantitative finance, MIT professor, and author
- Marvin Minsky (AB '50) - Turing Award winner for co-founding the field of artificial intelligence
- Robert Tappan Morris (AB '87, SM '93, PhD '99) - creator of the Morris Worm, the first computer worm on the internet and first person convicted under the Computer Fraud and Abuse Act, co-founded Y-Combinator, professor at MIT
- Dennis Ritchie (AB '63, PhD '68) - Turing Award winner, created the C programming language and Unix operating system
- Don Ross (PhD '53) - recipient of the Navy Distinguished Civilian Service Award, made important developments in reduction of submarine noise
- Donald Rubin (SM '66, PhD '70) - statistician known for the Rubin Causal Model
- Steven Salzberg (PhD '89) - computational biologist who made significant contributions to gene finding and sequence alignment bioinformatics algorithms, notably GLIMMER, MUMmer, and Bowtie
- Alfred Spector (AB '76) - co-founder of Transarc, former vice president of research at Google, and CTO of Two Sigma Investments
- Richard Stallman (AB '74) - founder of the Free Software Foundation
- Guy L. Steele Jr. (AB '75) - made significant contributions to the design and documentation of several programming languages
- Marius Vassiliou (AB '78) - computational physicist known for introducing Rokhlin's fast multipole method to computational electromagnetics
- An Wang (PhD '48) - invented magnetic core memory
- Stephanie Wilson (SB '88) - NASA astronaut
- Jane Willis (AB '91, JD '94) - member of the MIT Blackjack Team
- Tai Tsun Wu (SM '54, PhD '56) - physicist known for significant contributions in high-energy nuclear physics and statistical mechanics
- Harold Zirin (SB '50, PhD '53) - astrophysicist known as "Captain Corona"

== See also ==
- Engineering
- Glossary of engineering
