= Blooom =

Online investment adviser, 2013–2022

blooom
- Type: Private
- Industry: Investment services
- Founded: March 2013 in Overland Park, Kansas, United States
- Founders: Chris Costello; Kevin Conard; Randy AufDerHeide
- Defunct: December 31, 2022
- Fate: merged into Morgan Stanley
- Successor: Morgan Stanley
- Headquarters: Leawood, Kansas, United States
- AUM: $5 Billion
- Number of employees: 17 (2017)
- Website: blooom.com

Blooom, often stylized as "blooom", was an online registered investment adviser that managed individual participant accounts in IRAs and in employer sponsored retirement plans such as 401(k), 403(b), or TSP. The company was founded in 2013 by Chris Costello, who was chief executive officer. In January 2021, Blooom managed $5 billion in assets. In December 2022, it was purchased by Morgan Stanley and ceased operation.

== Funding ==
Non-profit organization, LaunchKC, awarded Blooom a $50,000 grant in September 2015. In October 2015, Blooom closed a $4 million Series A funding round led by QED Investors and had over $110 million in assets under management (AUM). Additional Series A investors included DST Systems, Commerce Ventures, Hyde Park Venture Partners, and UMB Financial Corporation. In November 2015, the company won the “One in a Million” competition and corresponding $10,000 award from the Ewing Marion Kauffman Foundation, a not for profit organization.

A $9.15 million Series B funding round was completed in early 2017, and the company had reached $500 million in AUM. Blooom announced a layoff of staff and a refocus of the company away from business-to-business and instead of business-to-client. This April 2017 change also involved the resignation of President, Greg Smith. By September 28, 2017, Blooom's Securities and Exchange Commission (SEC) ADV filings showed they had surpassed $1 billion in AUM. A change in leadership occurred in February 2018, as Matt Burgener replaced co-founder, Chris Costello, as CEO.
