= Aleksandr Aleksandrov =

Russian military officer and writer (1783–1866)

Alexander Andreevich Alexandrov
- Александръ Александровъ, Aleksandr Aleksandrov
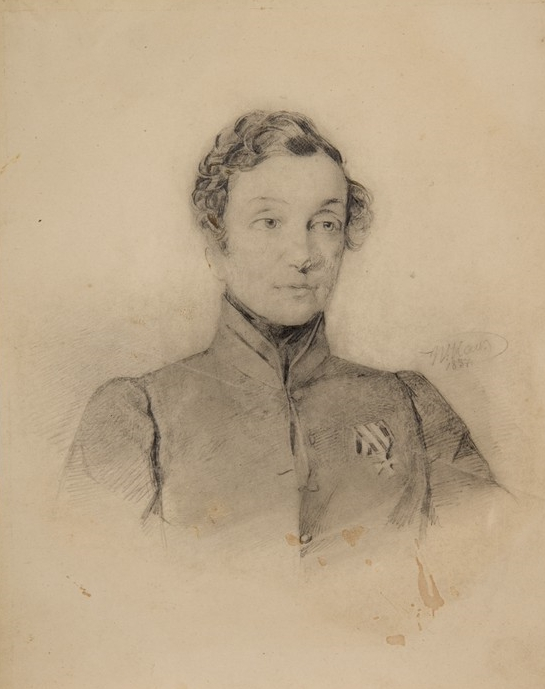
- Portrait by Woldemar Hau, 1837
- Born: Nadezhda Andreyevna Durova; 17 September 1783; Russian Empire
- Died: 21 March 1866 (aged 82); Yelabuga, Russian Empire
- Military career
- Allegiance: Russian Empire
- Branch: Imperial Russian Army
- Service years: 1806–1816
- Rank: Shtabs-kapitan (staff riding master)
- Nicknames: Alexander Durov; Alexander Sokolov
- Conflicts: War of the Fourth Coalition; Battle of Eylau; Battle of Friedland; French invasion of Russia; Battle of Smolensk (1812); Battle of Borodino
- Awards: Cross of St. George

Alexander Andreevich Alexandrov (Note: Russian: Александръ Александровъ, romanized: Aleksandr Aleksandrov) (born Nadezhda Andreyevna Durova; (Note: In this name that follows East Slavic naming customs, the patronymic is Andreyevna and the family name is Durova.) 17 September 1783 – 21 March 1866) was a Russian cavalry soldier and writer who participated in the Napoleonic Wars. Alexandrov was assigned female at birth, but solely presented as a man in adulthood.

At twenty-three, Alexandrov fled his home, and enlisted in an uhlan (light cavalry) regiment, dressing as a male soldier and taking on the name Alexander Sokolov. He served from 1806 to 1816, and received the Cross of St. George for bravery. After his service, he published a memoir, originally titled, "Notes of Alexsandrov", one of the earliest autobiographies in the Russian language. To his outrage, publishers disregarded the chosen name and title, re-titling it "Notes of N.A. Durova", and eventually The Cavalry Maiden.

Historians have traditionally regarded him as a female wartime cross-dresser, while several modern scholars describe him as a transgender man.

== Early life ==
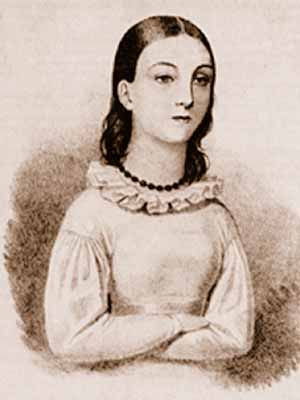
Portrait of Alexandrov at the age of 14

Alexander Andreevich Alexandrov (named Nadezhda Andreyevna Durova), was born on 17 September 1783, into the family of a Russian major. Sources identify his birth place as either the Vyatka Governorate of the Russian Empire, an army camp in Kyiv, or Kherson. His mother came from a family of wealthy landowners from Poltava, and married his father against the will of his own father. According to Alexandrov, his mother "passionately wanted to have a son" and was dismayed to apparently have a daughter instead; he describes an incident in which she—furious at her infant for crying all night—threw him from the window of a moving carriage, nearly killing him. After that his father placed him in the care of his soldiers. As a child, Alexandrov learned the standard marching commands, and an unloaded gun was his favorite toy.

After his father retired from service, he continued playing with broken sabers and frightened his family by secretly taming a stallion that they considered unbreakable.

In 1801, he married a Sarapul judge, Vasily Stefanovich Chernov, a man seven years his senior. He gave birth to Chernov's son on 4 January 1803. On 17 September 1806, Alexandrov dressed in a Cossack uniform, abandoned home, and enlisted in the Polish Uhlan Regiment, presenting himself as a nobleman named Alexander Sokolov.

== Military service and later life ==
As "Alexander Sokolov", he fought in the major Russian engagements of the 1806–1807 Prussian campaign. During two of those battles, he saved the lives of two fellow Russian soldiers. The first was an enlisted man who suffered a concussion falling off his horse in battle. Alexandrov provided first aid under heavy fire, and brought him to safety as the army retreated around them. The second was an officer, unhorsed but uninjured. Three French dragoons were closing on him. Alexandrov couched his lance and scattered the enemy. Then, against regulations, he let the officer borrow his own horse to hasten his retreat, which left Alexandrov himself more vulnerable to attack.

During the campaign, he wrote to his family explaining his disappearance. They used their connections in a desperate attempt to locate him. Rumors of an Amazon warrior in the army reached Tsar Alexander I, who took a personal interest and summoned him to the palace at St. Petersburg, where he was awarded the Cross of St. George and promoted to cornet of the Mariupol Hussar Regiment. The tsar also granted him the surname "Alexandrov".

In an era when Russian officers were expected to grow a mustache, Alexandrov's youthful appearance harmed his chances for promotion. He transferred away from the hussars to the Lithuanian Uhlan Regiment in order to avoid the colonel's daughter, who had fallen in love with him. He saw action again during Napoleon's invasion of Russia in 1812. He fought in the Battle of Smolensk. During the Battle of Borodino, a cannonball wounded him in the leg, yet he continued serving full duty for several days afterwards until ordered away to recuperate. He retired from the army in 1816 with the rank of stabs-rotmistr ("staff riding master"), the equivalent of captain lieutenant.

== Writings ==
Twenty years later, Alexandrov met writer Alexander Sergeyevich Pushkin. Upon learning that Alexandrov had kept a journal of his army service, Pushkin encouraged him to publish it as a memoir. Alexandrov added background about his early childhood, adjusted his age by seven years, and omitted any reference to his marriage. He wished to publish it as "Notes of Alexandrov", but Pushkin changed the title without his approval to "Notes of N.A. Durova" in 1836. An outraged Alexandrov wrote, "The name which you called me, dear sir Alexander Sergeyevich, in the preface haunts me! Is there no remedy for my grief? You called me by that name that makes me shudder, and soon 20,000 people will read it and call me by it too!" When it was published as a book, editor and publisher Ivan Butovskii retitled it to The Cavalry Maiden.

Alexandrov also wrote five other novels.

== Later life ==
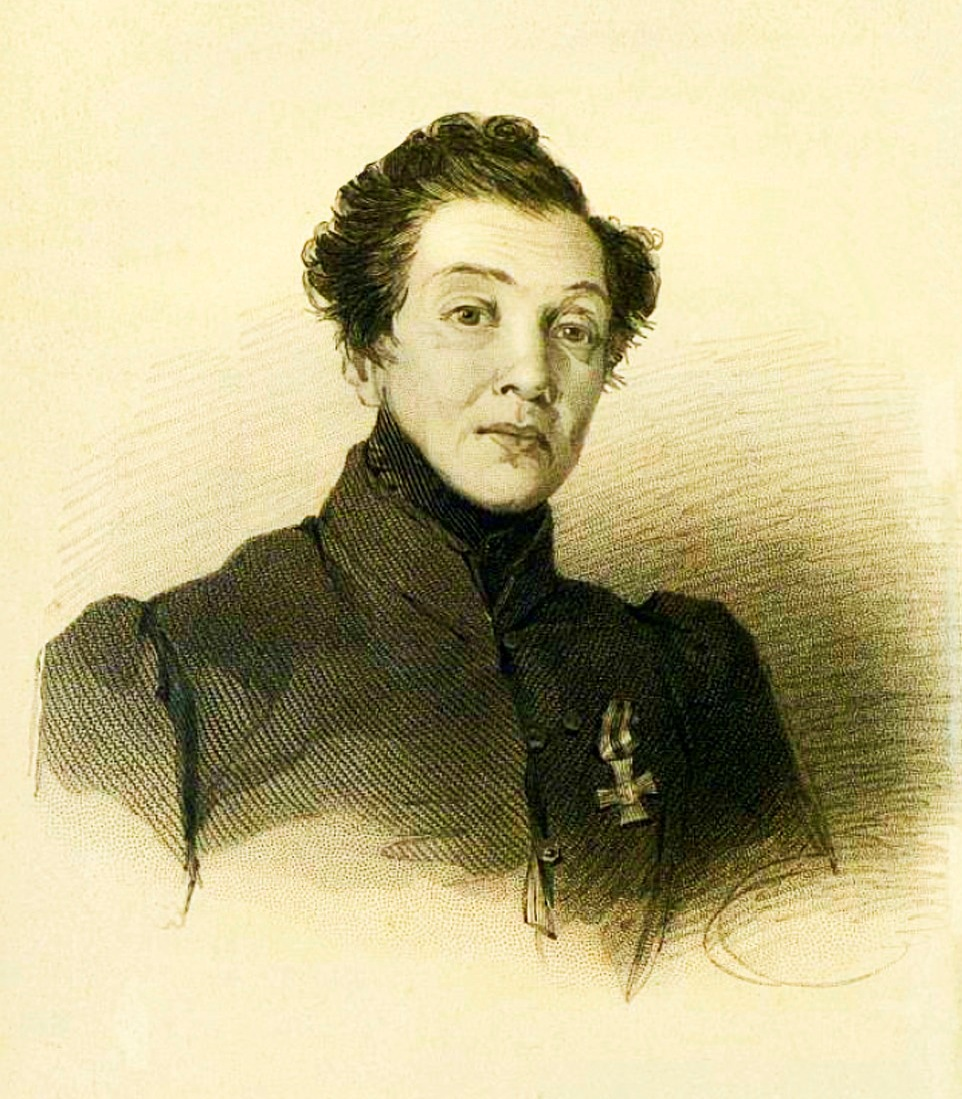
1839 lithography of Alexandrov by Alexander Brullov

Alexandrov continued to wear male clothing for the rest of his life, continued to use his male name, and spoke using masculine grammar.

He died in Yelabuga on 21 March 1866, and was buried with full military honors. His son, Ivan Durov, had died 10 years prior, in 1856.

== Legacy ==
Eldar Ryazanov's musical comedy Hussar Ballad romanticized Alexandrov's adventures in the army.

"Notes" is one of the few sustained accounts of the Napoleonic wars to describe events from the perspective of a junior officer and one of the earliest autobiographical works in Russian literature.

Alexandrov became a figure of some cultural interest in Eastern Europe but remained largely unknown in the Anglosphere until Mary Zirin's 1988 English translation of The Cavalry Maiden. Alexandrov is now a subject of university syllabi and scholarly publications in comparative literature and Russian history.

Ukrainian composer Valentina Ramm set Alexandrov's text to music.

=== Gender identity ===
Alexandrov's gender identity has been the subject of debate. Many historians and feminist scholars have described him as a cross-dressing woman, while some modern scholars say Alexandrov is better understood as transgender. In "Notes", he describes himself with terms of androgyny, describing himself both as a bogatyr and as an Amazon warrior. One of his prose stories, Nurmeka, revolves around a male-to-female cross-dresser, leading to speculation that this was an expression of a trans identity.

In his personal life, Alexandrov rejected femininity, and behaved as a man. After leaving the army, he continued to prefer the masculine name Alexander Alexandrov, which he used with the approval of Tsar Aleksander I. Public records recording him as Aleksandrov include his military pension accounts, his will, and the record of his death in the parish registry books.

== Artistic works ==
- Nadezhda Durova, an opera by Anatoly Bogatyrev.
- A Long Time Ago, a play by Alexander Gladkov.
- Hussar Ballad, an operetta by Tikhon Khrennikov
- Hussar Ballad, a film directed by Eldar Ryazanov.
- The Girl Who Fought Napoleon: A Novel of the Russian Empire, a novel by Linda Lafferty

== Bibliography ==
- Durova, Nadezhda, The Cavalry Maiden: Journals of a Russian Officer in the Napoleonic Wars. Mary Fleming Zirin. Indiana University Press, 1989. ISBN 0-253-20549-2 (see book reviews on Amazon.com).

== See also ==
- Battle of Eylau
- Battle of Friedland
- Battle of Jena-Auerstedt
- History of Russia (1796–1855)
