= Lazar Gulkowitsch =

Belarusian scholar

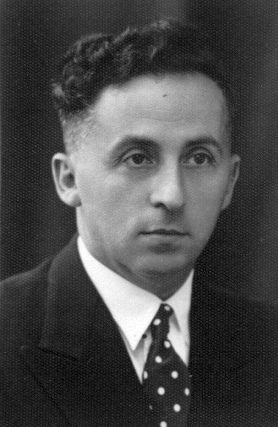
- Born: 20 December 1898; Zirin, Minsk
- Died: July 1941 (aged 42); Tartu, Estonia
- Education: University of Königsberg

Lazar Gulkowitsch (Russian: Лазарь Гулькович; 20 December 1898 – July 1941), also Gulkovich or Gulkowicz; was an eminent Estonian Jewish Studies scholar. He was killed by the Nazis in the summer of 1941.

== Life ==
He was born in Zirin, Minsk province, Russian Empire as the son of a merchant. Gulkowitsch attended school in Baranavichy and then the famous Mir Yeshiva. During World War I, the family fled to Nikolayev, Ukraine, where Gulkowitsch graduated from high school.

In 1918-1919, Gulkowitsch went to Virbalis in Lithuania, where he headed a Hebrew-speaking basic school and was part of the Rabbinate. He then took up studying medicine at the University of Königsberg, Germany (now Kaliningrad, Russia), but also attended classes in Philosophy and Theology, especially Old Testament. In 1922, he received both a Ph.D. and an M.A., the former with a work on the Kabbalah, and in 1924, and M.D., with a specialization in ophthalmology. In Königsberg, Gulkowitsch married Frieda Rabinowitz (27 February 1900 – Fall 1941); the couple had two daughters.

Immediately after handing in his medical dissertation, however, Gulkowitsch had been invited by the University of Leipzig to take over the lectureship in Hebrew, Aramaic, and Talmudic Sciences from the renowned and recently deceased Israel Issar Kahan. Leipzig in Saxony was then the "mecca" of Oriental Studies in Germany, a very large and very highly regarded university (probably the best outside of Prussia). Gulkowitsch also became director of the Institute of Late Jewish Studies within the Old Testament division of the Divinity School. With his appointment, Gulkowitsch automatically became a German citizen.

At Leipzig, Gulkowitsch not only taught but continued studying there, with the eminent scholars available (especially in Islamic Studies, Near Eastern Studies, Ethiopian Studies, and Assyriology, as well as Philosophy with the eminent Theodor Litt) towards his Habilitation, which he attained in 1927. Continuing at Leipzig as Privatdozent (unsalaried senior lecturer who may be called to a professorship), he became, in 1932, Professor extraordinary (full professor without a chair) of Late Jewish Studies within the Faculty of Philosophy, the only such position within a German university. However, already a year later, in 1933, due to the Nazi rise to power and the Nuremberg race laws (which were, i.a., directed against Jews as civil servants, which in Germany professors are), he was dismissed from the University of Leipzig.

In the same year, however, the University of Tartu in Estonia, which had a very distinguished tradition of Oriental Studies and Hebrew, had opened, pushed by the local scholars and supported, i.a., by Albert Einstein - a new Institute of Jewish Studies – a remarkable and defiant feat for 1933, even for an independent country like Estonia proud of its minority rights laws. Gulkowitsch received the appointment as Professor and Chair of Jewish Studies and started teaching in Tartu in 1934. He attracted many high-calibre graduate students (mostly Jewish) and established an international publication series on Jewish Studies. Gulkowitsch taught in German; the Tartu institute was probably the only place in the world where scholarship on Jewish issues in German was possible to be upheld during times of the Holocaust. During his Tartu tenure, Gulkowitsch travelled as much abroad as was possible during that time, especially to Sweden (Uppsala University) and Britain (University of Cambridge).

After the Soviet Union invaded and annexed Estonia for the first time in 1940, Gulkowitsch's chair was abolished in 1941 and he himself dismissed. When the Nazis invaded Estonia in the same year, Gulkowitsch and, perhaps some weeks later, his entire family were – like almost 1,000 Estonian Jews who had not been deported and remained there – murdered by the Nazis.

== Work ==
Gulkowitsch's methodology was philological, he approached his studies from the perspective of a critical reading of the relevant texts. Gulkowitsch's main areas of research covered the fields of:

- Chassidism (towards which he was critical as an irrational and mystic phenomenon)
- the Kabbalah (as a rational system)
- linguistic history of Hebrew and methodology of philological approaches generally
- translations and editions of Talmudic tracts
- Maimonides and Spinoza

The irrational-mystic approach to the study of religion also has its proponents (one could mention the tradition of Rudolf Otto and his classic The Holy (1917) here), but in the Comparative Religion field, Gulkowitsch's approach, if somehow modified, could today be considered mainstream. This is less so within Jewish Studies (and the study of that discipline), partially for historical reasons, because the rationalism of Gulkowitsch's style seemed to some unduly accommodationist to non-Jewish principles and systems of thought and too critical of its mystic traditions (Gulkowitsch indeed demystifies the Kabbala and the Talmud and is very critical of Chassidism). Thus, Jewish Studies scholars like Gerschom Sholem have criticized, and continue to criticize, Gulkowitsch's work.

Because many of Gulkowitsch's writings after 1933 were published in German in Estonia, they were actually not very well distributed and did not become part of the scholarly discourse of Jewish Studies, although they are of an extremely high quality and put Gulkowitsch clearly at the forefront of his area. Recent efforts to republish his most significant works with Germany's leading publisher of Judaica, Mohr Siebeck in Tübingen, failed in 2005, after agreement with the press had already been reached, for unknown reasons on the publishers' side. In 2022, Gulkowitsch’s Writings on the Conceptual Historical Method 1934-1940/41 were published with Vandenhoeck & Ruprecht.
