= Zirin =

Zirin is a surname. Notable people with the surname include:

- Dave Zirin (born 1974), American sportswriter
- Harold Zirin (1929–2012), American solar astronomer
- James D. Zirin (born 1940), American lawyer, writer, and talk show host
- Mary Zirin (1932–2019), American academic on Russian and Slavic women

== See also ==
- Zir'in, Palestinian village
