= David Roy =

David Roy may refer to:

- David C. Roy (born 1952), kinetic sculptor
- David Tod Roy (1933–2016), American sinologist and scholar of Chinese literature
