= IntraLinks =

American technology company

Intralinks
- Industry: Financial technology
- Founded: 1996
- Headquarters: Boston, United States
- Key people: Ken Bisconti, CEO
- Parent: SS&C Technologies
- Website: intralinks.com

Intralinks is an American financial technology provider. Founded in 1996, it was purchased by SS&C Technologies in 2018. Its products focus on enterprise collaboration and strategic transactions.

== History ==
Intralinks was founded in New York City in 1996. Founders Mark Adams and John Muldoon had previously worked in banking. Arthur Sculley was a major early investor, and was the first chair of the company's board. Adams served as CEO and president. Its official launch was held at J.P. Morgan & Co. in September 1997.

The company was initially working in the area of loan syndication, operating on a subscription model. It developed web-based secure document exchange services, built on Lotus Notes and hosted by the IBM Global Network. It also supported creation of "financial industry standards for digitally signing contracts". A 2002 profile in Crain's New York Business described it as "the standard by which large banks conduct loan syndication deals". Early major clients included J.P. Morgan, Bank of America, and Chase Manhattan Bank.

Intralinks began to expand rapidly in 1998, jumping from 9 staff to 40. It conducted its first private placement transactions in 1999. Its London office opened that same year. In 2000, James Dougherty became CEO, and Intralinks filed an initial public offering (IPO). However, the IPO was withdrawn twice due to market concerns. In 2001 it reported a 350% increase in revenue since 1999, although it also downsized 50% of its staff in that year. Patrick Wack Jr was named CEO the following year. It launched virtual data rooms for mergers and acquisitions in 2002. In 2004, it announced having facilitated $5 trillion in total syndicated loan transactions. It withdrew another IPO in 2005.

TA Associates acquired a majority stake in the company in 2007 after a recapitalization resulting in $275 million in debt. J. Andrew Damico was named CEO in 2008. The company made an IPO in 2010, resulting in almost $145 million in funding. Shares were anticipated to cost $14 to $16 but were sold at $13 on the New York Stock Exchange. A follow-on offering was proposed in April 2011 to reduce debt, which at that time was over $127 million. Also in 2011, Ronald Hovsepian was appointed CEO; he had become one of the ten highest paid tech CEOs by 2016.

In 2013, it acquired deal sourcing platforms PE-Nexus and MergerID. It merged the two platforms to create Intralinks Dealnexus, "a global deal sourcing network", which included a free app for seeking potential mergers and acquisitions. In the same year, it introduced Intralinks VIA, a cloud-based collaboration platform. Intralinks acquired docTrackr, a document security company, in 2014 for $10 million. It began using HP Helion for its applications in 2015. In 2016, it acquired the cloud infrastructure business Verilume.

Intralinks was acquired by Synchronoss Technologies in January 2017 for around $821 million. Hovsepian was named CEO of Synchronoss (although he left the company a few months later). At the time, according to New Jersey Business Magazine, "over 4.1 million business users across the world have used its secure, cloud-based platform, and it counts 99% of Fortune 1000 companies among its customers". Later that same year Synchronoss sold Intralinks to Siris Capital Group for $1 billion. Leif O'Leary became CEO, and Intralinks acted "as an independent Siris portfolio company". The following year, SS&C Technologies announced that it had acquired Intralinks for $1.5 billion.

== Operations ==
SS&C logo

The company operates as SS&C Intralinks. As of 2018 it had 800 employees and an annual revenue of $325 million. Global Custodian reported that "Its communications platform is one of the most-used by private equity and hedge fund managers, with the largest hosted community of general and limited partners for the alternatives investments industry." According to the company, 988 of the Fortune 1000 companies use its products.

Intralinks has 32 locations worldwide, including in the United States, Mexico, Brazil, China, India, South Korea, Japan, Singapore, Australia, Romania, Hungary, Germany, the United Kingdom, Italy, Greece, Austria, France, Spain, Switzerland, Sweden, the United Arab Emirates, South Africa, Nigeria, Israel, and Turkiye. It is headquartered in Boston.

== Awards ==
- Inc 500
- BIG Innovation Award, 2020 and 2021
- Fortress Cyber Security Award, 2022, 2023 and 2025
