= SS&C Technologies =

American financial technology company

SS&C Technologies Holdings, Inc.
- Type: Public
- Traded as: Nasdaq: SSNC; Russell 1000 component
- Industry: Financial Technology Software Products
- Founded: March 1, 1986; 40 years ago, in Windsor, Connecticut, as Security Software & Consulting Inc.
- Founders: William C. Stone
- Headquarters: Windsor, Connecticut, U.S.
- Area served: Worldwide
- Key people: William C. Stone (chairman and CEO); Rahul Kanwar (president and COO); Patrick J. Pedonti (CFO); Anthony Caiafa (CTO)
- Products: Software enabled services
- Revenue: ▲US$5.503 billion (2024)
- Operating income: ▼US$1.042 billion (2024)
- Net income: ▼US$607 million (2024)
- Total assets: ▲US$17.33 billion (2021)
- Total equity: ▲US$6.23 billion (2021)
- Number of employees: 26,600 (December 2024)
- Website: ssctech.com

SS&C Technologies Holdings, Inc. (known as SS&C or Securities Software and Consulting) is an American multinational holding company headquartered in Windsor, Connecticut, that sells software and software as a service to the financial services industry. The company has offices in the Americas, Europe, Asia, Africa and Australia.

Through its numerous acquired subsidiaries, such as Advent Software, Varden Technologies, Eze Software, Intralinks, and Primatics Financial, SS&C specializes in specific fintech markets, such as fund administration, wealth management accounting, and insurance and pension funds. In 2020 SS&C Technologies reported in their balance sheet over $1.69 trillion in Assets Under Custody (AUC).

== History ==
SS&C was founded by William C. Stone in 1986. The company went through an initial public offering process for the first time in 1996. It was taken private in a leveraged buyout in 2005 with Sunshine Acquisition Corp., affiliated with The Carlyle Group. And after some years as a private company, SS&C was taken public again in a second IPO in 2010 through a listing on Nasdaq under the symbol SSNC.

In 2021, Mammoth Scientific selected SS&C as the administrator and technology partner for its $100 million venture capital fund. The fund is for health science and technology companies. In October, Gordian Capital started using the company's Eze Investment Suite for its trading, portfolio, and risk management services in Singapore and Japan.

In May 2022, Liontrust Asset Management extended its mandate with SS&C. The company uses SS&C's products to manage the majority of its £38.5 billion in assets.

In June, SS&C released a new asset allocator platform for institutional investors. It was powered by FundHub and provided fund data aggregation and analysis, holdings look-through, document management, ABOR and IBOR reporting, performance management, liquidity planning, and exposure analysis.

== Acquisitions ==
SS&C Technologies acquired a variety of companies to bring products and talent into the company. Since 1995, it has acquired more than 50 companies.

Company	Industry/Service	Year	Source
Shepro Braun	Investment software	1997	
Mabel Systems	Portfolio management	1997	
Quantra	Real estate equity and debt investment management	1998	
HedgeWare, Inc.	Portfolio, tax accounting and financial partnership software	1999	
Digital Visions assets of Netzee Inc.	Internet banking products and services and internet commerce products	2001	
Amicorp Fund Services	Fund administration	2003	
Investment Advisory Network, LLC	Financial portfolio manager	2004	
NeoVision Hypersystems, Inc.	Financial data and analytics/trading activity and customer portfolio performance	2004	
OMR Systems	Treasury processing software and outsourcing solutions	2004	
Financial Models Company, Inc.	Technology solutions and services for investments	2005	
Eisnerfast	Fund accounting	2005	
Financial Interactive	CRM and fund profiling software	2005	
MarginMan	Collateralized trading software	2005	
Open Information Systems	Web-based support applications for financial institutions	2005	
Cogent Management	Hedge fund management services	2006	
Zoologic	Education software	2006	
Northport, LLC	Fund administration	2007	
Micro Design Services, LLC	Software design and development	2008	
Evare, LLC	Managed utility service provider for financial data	2009	
MAXIMIS business from Unisys	Investment accounting software	2009	
TheNextRound, Inc.	Software developer for private equity and alternative investments	2009	
Tradeware Global	Broker-neutral system provider for equity market access	2010	
Geller Investment Partnership Services	Investment partnership services	2010	
TD Ameritrade's Thinklink Product	Order management software	2010	
TimeShareWare	Technology solutions for shared-ownership resorts	2010	
BDO Simpson Xavier Fund Administration Services Limited	Fund administrator	2011	
Teledata Communications, Inc. software assets	Background-search and credit-retrieval software and services	2011	
Hedgemetrix	Back-office services for alternative investment funds	2012	
Thomson Reuters' PORTIA	Middle-to-back office investment operations platform	2012	
GlopeOp Financial Services S.A.	Fund services	2012	
Gravity Financial	Fund administrator	2012	
Prime Management Limited	Fund administrator	2013	
DST Global Solutions	Investment and fund management and analytics	2014	
Advent Software	Financial services	2015	
Varden Technologies	Software communication solutions	2015	
Primatics Financial	Accounting, forecasting, regulatory reporting, reserving and stress testing	2015	
Modestspark	Client portal and digital client experience tools	2017	
DST Systems	Information processing and software	2018	
Eze Software	Investment software	2018	
Intralinks	Financial technology	2018	
Algorithmics Inc.	Financial risk management	2019	
MineralWare	Cloud-based asset management platform	2022	
Blue Prism Group, PLC	Robotic process automation	2022	
Tier1 CRM	Capital markets CRM	2022	
Curo Fund Services	Investment Administration	2025	

== Services and Subsidiaries ==
=== SS&C Fund Services ===
SS&C Fund Services offers fund administration services for hedge funds, funds of funds, private equity funds and managed account managers. Rahul Kanwar, Senior Vice President and Managing Director is a key executive for SS&C Fund Services.

=== SS&C GlobeOp Investor Services ===
SS&C GlobeOp is a fund administrator offering financial technology products and services.

=== SS&C Global Wealth Management ===
The SS&C Global Wealth Platform offers secured web-based multi-currency wealth management aimed to support all aspects of investment management.

=== SS&C Skyline ===
SS&C Skyline is an accounting system designed for property management functions. The property management software can be used as a marketing platform that helps users find new tenants through common rental websites and online applications.

=== SS&C BenefiX ===
BenefiX is SS&C's product to employee benefits data management and exchange. It is a cloud-based data exchange service that transforms, translates and transmits employee benefits data to insurance carriers and administrators.
