= Jason Kingdon =

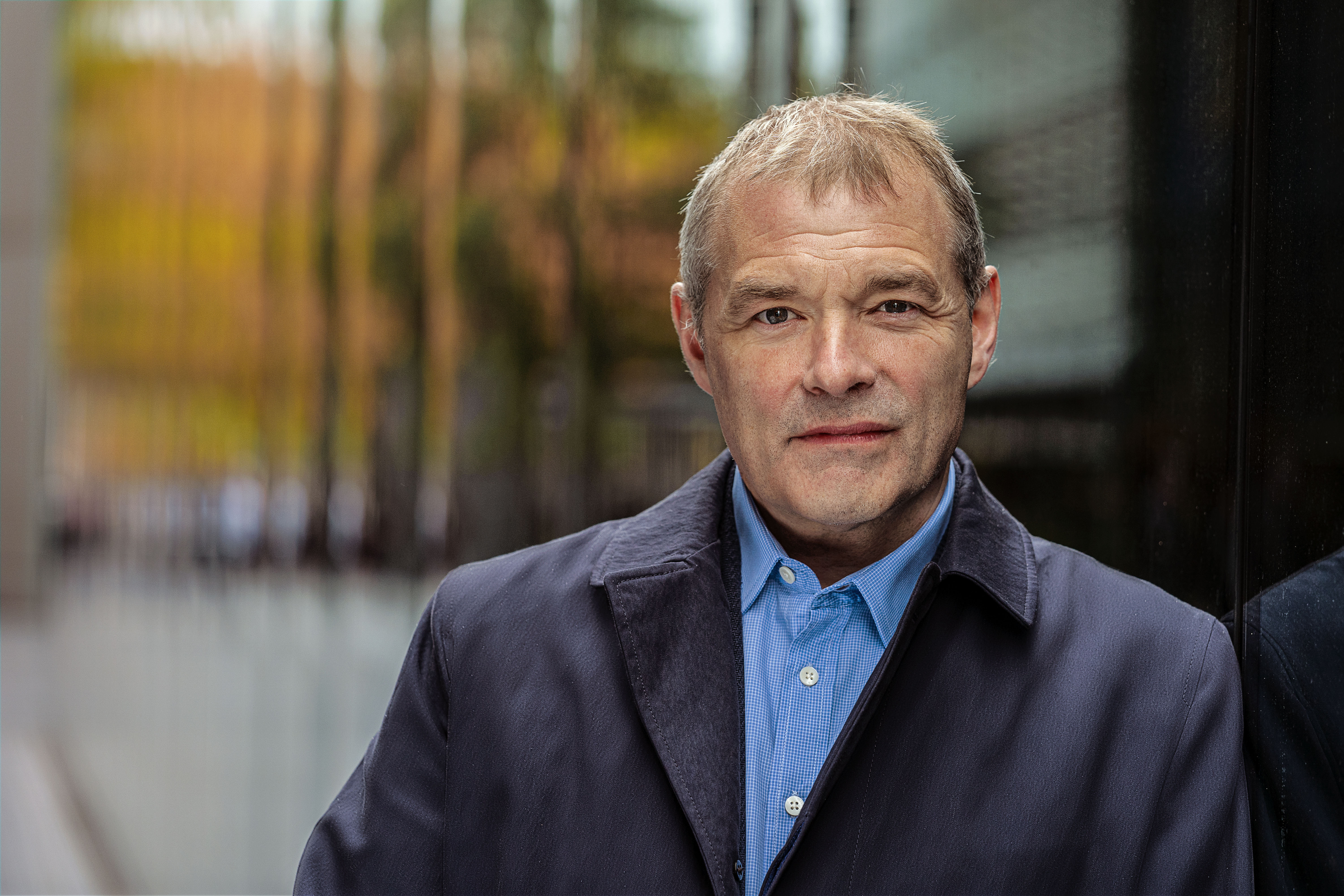
- Born: United Kingdom
- Education: University College London, Queen Mary University of London, University of Bristol

Jason Kingdon is a computer scientist and entrepreneur. He was previously CEO of Blue Prism and co-founder of several AI companies. He was co-founder of UCL's Intelligent Systems Lab where he introduced the use of a neural network in live financial forecasting, and co-founder and CEO of Searchspace, a company that applied AI to detect money laundering and detect insider dealing at banks and stock exchanges. In 2008, he joined Blue Prism as executive chairman. The company has been credited with creating the Robotic Process Automation market.

== Education ==
Kingdon completed his undergraduate degree in pure mathematics at Queen Mary University of London, masters in Mathematical Logic and Theory Computation at the University of Bristol and his PhD in Computer Science at University College London. His PhD thesis was on feed-forward Neural Networks (NN) and genetic algorithms for automated financial time series modelling.

== Career ==
Since the mid-1990s, Kingdon has worked on applying AI to enterprise-scale problems.

While a PhD student at UCL, he co-founded Searchspace and also co-founded the Intelligent Systems Lab. Searchspace applied AI to detect money laundering, detect insider dealing detection at banks and stock exchanges. In 2005, he sold Searchspace to Warburg Pincus for $140 million.

Kingdon became an early investor in Blue Prism, a Robotic Process Automation (RPA) company, a category of enterprise software that it helped define. He led business strategy and the IPO in 2016. As of 2020, he is the CEO and chairman of the company. The company's software provides a 'digital workforce' to organisations that carry out tasks the same way existing users do. It has over 2000 customers in 70 commercial sectors, and in more than 170 countries.

In 2020 in an article for Computer Weekly, Kingdon introduced the notion of the Digital Singularity where he pointed out that a consequence of robotic process automation was that all digital technologies past, present, and future could now interoperate. He suggests this will usher a new phase of hyper-acceleration of digital technologies akin to the invention of a new Internet.

== Awards ==
Kingdon received the 2003 Ernst & Young Entrepreneur of the Year, and on behalf of Searchspace received Deloitte Fast 50 list of fastest growing technology companies in 2002 and 2005, and the Sunday Times’ Tech Track 100 in 2002 and 2005.

== Publications ==
Kingdon has published books, patents and papers in the fields of neural networks, genetic algorithms, fraud detection, robotic process automation and the future of enterprise computing.

His patents include: "Method and system for combating robots and rogues" and "Value flow monitoring system".
