= QuantConnect =

Trading platform

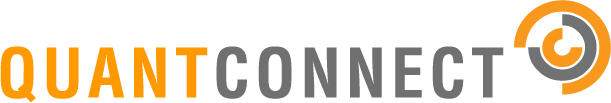
- Type: Privately held company
- Founded: 2011; 15 years ago
- Founder: Jared Broad
- Headquarters: Seattle, Washington, United States
- Products: QuantConnect Data Explorer, Alpha Streams, LEAN
- Services: Web platform
- Website: www.quantconnect.com

QuantConnect is an open-source, cloud-based algorithmic trading platform for stocks, FX, futures, options, derivatives and cryptocurrencies. QuantConnect serves over 100,000 quants from over 170 countries, with customers including hedge funds and brokers, as well as individuals such as engineers, mathematicians, scientists, quants, students, traders, and programmers.

== History ==
Jared Broad founded QuantConnect in 2011. Broad started the company in his downtime while doing humanitarian work in Chile. QuantConnect became incorporated in 2013, and became open-sourced in 2015.

QuantConnect has seen substantial user growth in recent years, going from 45,000 users in December 2017, to 55,000 users in May 2018, then to over 65,000 users in October 2018. About half of the company's users are in the U.S. and the other half are international. QuantConnect added cryptocurrency support in October 2017, integrating with Coinbase’s GDAX exchange.

== Business model ==
QuantConnect provides market data and a cluster computer directly to engineers around the world, backtesting and building quantitative trading strategies across multiple markets, including equities, futures, options, cryptocurrencies, CFDs and FX. Once the team greenlights a user-generated algorithm, it is loaded into QuantConnect's Alpha Streams API and priced accordingly by the quant who developed it.

According to Broad, about 5% of users consider their work with QuantConnect to be full-time. Rather, many algo traders use the platform's technology infrastructure to launch their own hedge fund startups.

QuantConnect launched its Alpha Streams project in December 2017. This marketplace provides the community the freedom to license their alpha-generating insights to quantitative funds. Hedge funds that leverage the Alpha Streams API search for algorithms that fit their specific criteria and license them for a monthly fee. Quants earn 70% of these fees, which can run anywhere from $100 to $30,000.

== Technology ==
QuantConnect supports coding in Python and C#, but also supports other languages through its open-source project, the Lean Algorithmic Trading Engine (LEAN). LEAN is an open-source algorithmic trading engine that allows users to do the same algorithm design, backtesting, and trading that they can do on the website. Once users code an algorithm, they can run a backtest on historical data, which provides a full breakdown on how it could have performed in the market in the past.

LEAN is free to download and extend for commercial purposes. As of January 2021, there are over 100 LEAN-Powered Hedge Funds and 103,000 live algorithms successfully deployed on LEAN, with over $8.1 billion of asset volume traded through the engine.

== Industry and competition ==
Founded in 2011, Quantopian was an early leader in the space and a key competitor of QuantConnect. Platforms like QuantConnect and CrunchDAO capitalized on Quantopian's shut-down in 2020, with an industry journalist commenting in November 2020, "QuantConnect has 115,000 users and some of its strategies are being licensed with funds that have $65bn in aggregate AUM". The quant community also relies on a number of open source projects.
