= Karen Rubin =

American serial entrepreneur

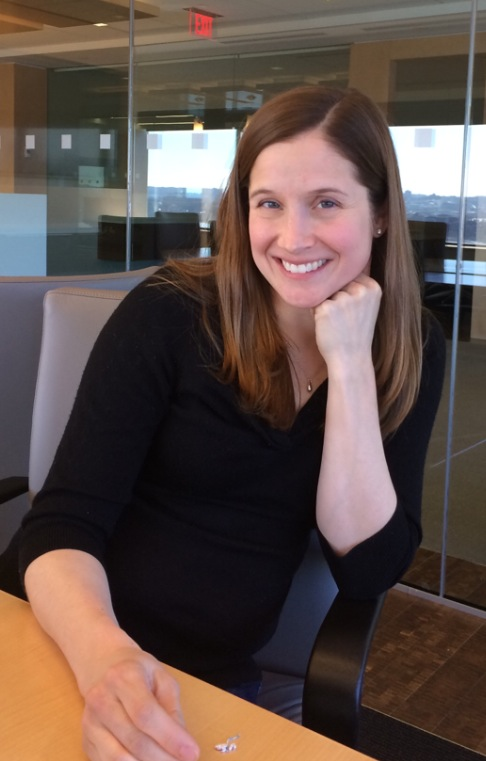
- Karen Rubin, January 2014
- Education: Trinity College
- Occupation: Entrepreneur
- Parents: David C. Roy (father); Marji Roy (mother)

Karen Ann Rubin (born Karen Ann Roy) is an American entrepreneur and banker. She joined HubSpot where she was a product manager but also co-hosted HubSpot TV, and was entrepreneur-in-residence at Matrix Partners in 2013-2014. In 2014, she joined Quantopian as Vice President of Product Management. In 2015 she authored a study that shows that women-led companies perform better than average. She started her career in 2004 in investment banking.

== Early life and education ==
Rubin's father, David C. Roy, is a physicist turned kinetic sculptor and her mother Marji Roy is a sculptor turned business person. From an early age, she showed in interest in presenting to the camera. She completed her BS in Computer Science at Trinity College in Hartford, Connecticut in 2004. She lettered ten times in cross-country, two times as Captain in the All Americans Division III Cross Country of the U.S. Track & Field and Cross Country Coaches Association.

== Career ==
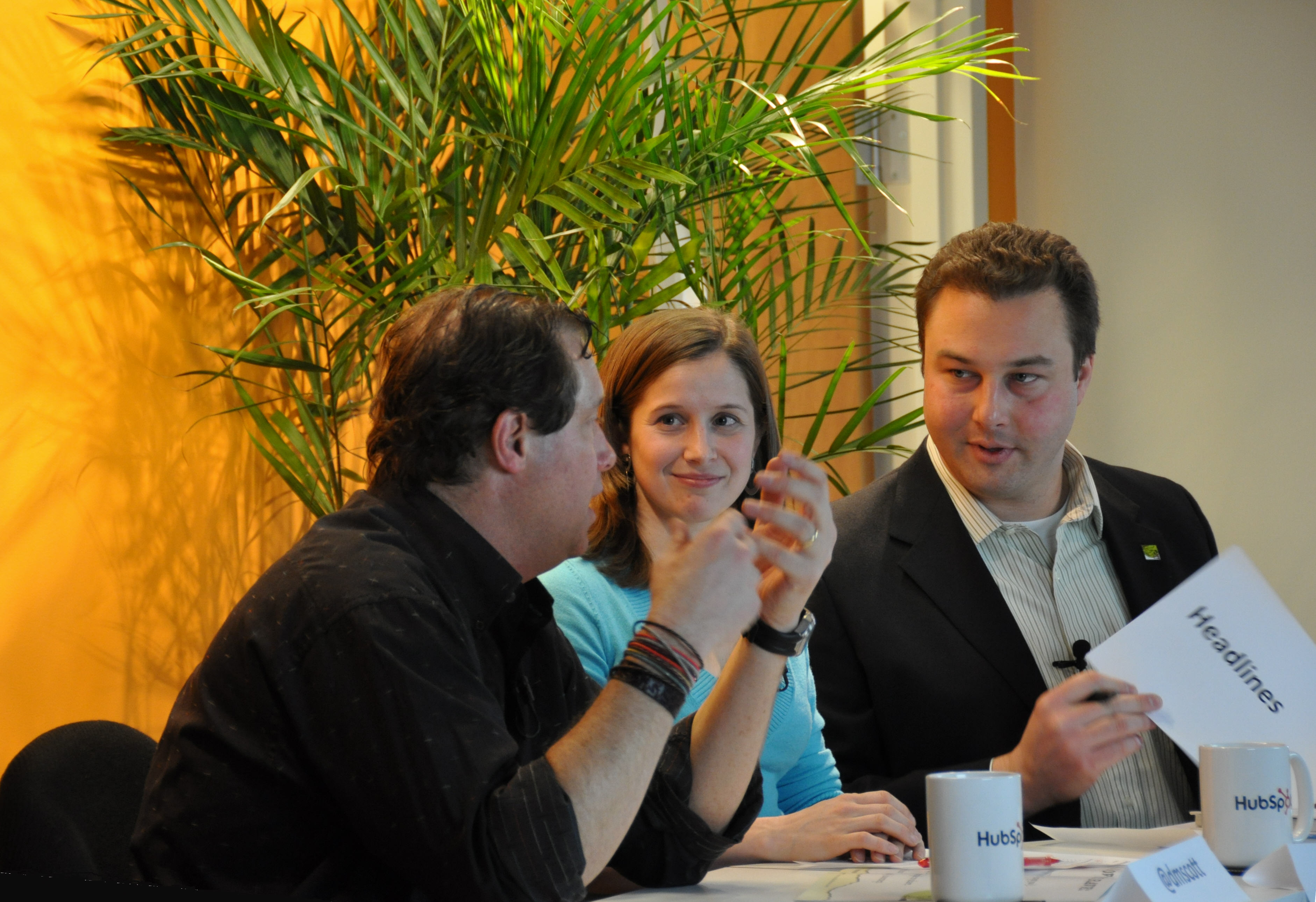
Karen Rubin and Mike Volpe (right) host David Meerman Scott on HubSpot.TV February 13, 2009

Beginning her career in 2004 in investment banking, she then completed four years as project manager for Promotions (acquired by TheStreet.com in 2007). She moved to Boston to join HubSpot as employee number 30 in 2008. Although her main job there was product management, she also co-hosted several hundred weekly episodes of a webcast called first "HubSpot TV" then "Marketing Update." In 2013-2014 she spent 14 months as entrepreneur-in-residence at Matrix Partners. From 2014 to 2016, she was VP of Product at Quantopian. In 2016 Rubin joined the robotics and teleconferencing company, Owl Labs, as VP of Growth.

Rubin is presently chief operating officer of Sense, a Massachusetts-based smart metering software provider.

== Study of performance of women-led businesses ==
In 2015, Rubin published a study that shows that a hypothetical portfolio of investments in women-led companies would perform three times better than an investment in an index fund based on the S&P 500 over the same period. Her study was inspired by a Credit Suisse’s Gender 3000 report, specifically that "Companies with more than one woman on the board have returned a compound 3.7% a year over those that have none..." and yet paradoxically only "12.7% of boards had gender diversity."
