= Marji Roy =

American designer and educator

Marjorie E. Roy (Marji Roy) is an American designer, and educator notable for her paper crafting and 3D design work. She is the founder of the creative lifestyle blog Ashbee Design and the digital design store 3DCuts.com, where she shares original cutting files and tutorials for paper-based projects. Roy's work emphasizes clean, modern aesthetics, often inspired by Scandinavian design principles.

== Early life and education ==
Roy holds a degree in arts from Rhode Island School of Design, majoring in sculpture. Her static wooden machine sculptures inspired her husband-to-be, David C. Roy, to build kinetic versions. Initially, they built them together. She has taught both high school and college-level courses in visual arts. Her educational experience informs her clear instructional style, making her projects accessible to a broad audience.

== Career ==
Roy began her crafting journey with the Silhouette Cameo cutting machine, creating and sharing designs through her blog, Ashbee Design. As her work gained popularity, she expanded her offerings to include SVG, PDF, and DXF files compatible with various cutting machines, leading to the establishment of 3DCuts.com.

Her designs have been featured in various publications and platforms. For instance, her pastel ombre Easter eggs were highlighted in a Mental Floss article on creative egg decorating techniques.

== Notable projects ==
- Ledge Village: A series of 3D paper buildings designed to sit on narrow ledges, combining architectural detail with space-saving design.

== Personal life ==
Marji Roy resides in Ashford, Connecticut, with her husband. Together, they collaborate on various artistic projects, blending their talents in design and sculpture. Karen Rubin is their daughter.
