= John Fawcett (entrepreneur) =

American entrepreneur (born 1977)

John Henry "Fawce" Fawcett Jr.
- Born: 1977 (age 48–49)
- Education: Harvard University
- Occupation: Entrepreneur
- Spouse: Caitlin Madera

John Henry "Fawce" Fawcett Jr. (born 1977) is an American entrepreneur who co-founded Tamale Software and Quantopian. He was the CEO of the latter.

== Early life and education ==
Fawcett was born in 1977 to Ann Fawcett (née Fuller), a nurse, and John H. Fawcett, Sr., a carpenter, business owner, and math teacher. He grew up in Lowell, Massachusetts, in the Pawtucketville neighborhood, with his parents and elder brother, Todd Fawcett. Fawcett and his brother worked at the family business, John H. Fawcett & Sons, until graduating from college. He attended the Ste. Jeanne d'Arc School through the 8th grade, before graduating high school at Phillips Academy. He graduated cum laude with an AB in Materials Science at Harvard University in 1999, and married Caitlin Jones Madera in 2001.

== Career ==
After college he was a programmer for Scient, on a video coding project, and an analyst and programmer for 033 Asset Management, a hedge fund. In 2002 he co-founded Tamale Software, which developed software for fundamental stock analysis. In 2008, Advent Software acquired Tamale for $28 million and shares in the company. He founded Quantopian in August 2011. It aims to create a crowd-sourced hedge fund using a two-sided market for freelance quantitative analysts (algorithm developers) and investors (algorithm users).

By 2015, Quantopian had raised about $24 million in investments from Spark Capital, Global Electronic Trading Company, Khosla Ventures, Wicklow Capital, Bessemer Venture Partners, and others.

Quantopian stopped operations unexpectedly at the start of 2020, and Fawcett and his cofounder, Jean Bredeche, joined Robinhood.

In 2025, Fawcett left Robinhood and joined Citadel as the head of equities engineering.

== Publications ==
Writing for Wired magazine, Fawcett posits that Quantopian can also be used as a MOOC-like platform for higher education.
