= William C. Stone =

American billionaire businessman

- Born: 1955 (age 70–71); Evansville, Indiana
- Occupation: Businessman
- Spouse: Mary (O’Daniel) Stone
- Children: 3

William (Bill) Charles Stone is the founder, chairman and chief executive officer (CEO) of SS&C Technologies (NASDAQ: SSNC), a provider of services and software for the financial services and healthcare industries.

== Early life ==
Bill Stone (William C. Stone) was born and raised in Evansville, Indiana. Both Stone and his future wife, Mary (O’Daniel) Stone, graduated from Reitz Memorial High School in 1973. In high school, Stone was an athlete and captain of Reitz Memorial's football team.

== College ==
After high school, Stone attended Marquette University in Milwaukee, Wisconsin. He received a Bachelor of Business Administration from Marquette University in 1977.

== Personal life ==
Stone has a residence in Naples, Florida. He is married to Mary Stone. The couple has three children.

== Career ==
Stone is the CEO and founder of SS&C Technologies, which he started out of his home in Connecticut in 1986.

=== Pre-SS&C Career ===
Before founding SS&C Technologies, Stone began his career in 1977 at KPMG, a financial services consultancy and accounting firm in St. Louis, Missouri. Stone would eventually become a director at KPMG and move to Hartford, Connecticut where the company is headquartered.

While at KPMG, Stone also served as a vice president of administration and special investment services at The Advest Group, which at the time was the 12th largest broker-dealer in the United States.

=== Founding SS&C Technologies ===
By 1986, Stone had saved up about $20,000 from his time working at KPMG. That year, the then 30-year-old Stone left his job to start SS&C out of his garage. The company launched with just four employees but quickly grew to 17 the next year before more than doubling in 1988.

Over the next decade, SS&C Technologies grew to reach revenues of $18 million from the sales and development of software for financial institutions. SS&C Technologies’ clients included asset managers, bankers and insurers who were looking to manage their books digitally.

SS&C Technologies went public in 1996 with Stone navigating the firm's initial public offering (IPO). His next big challenge came at the turn of the century when the dot-com bust sent ripples throughout the economy. In response, Stone took the company private in 2005.

Stone took the company public for the second time in March 2010.

Stone is CEO and Chairman of the Board of Directors at SS&C Technologies (as of March 2019). Stone has also held various other titles while at the company's helm.

- 1986–present: CEO and Chairman of the Board of Directors, SS&C Technologies Holdings, Inc. and SS&C Technologies, Inc.
- 1986-1997; 1999-2004: President, SS&C Technologies Holdings Inc.
- 1999-2004: President and Secretary, SS&C Technologies Inc.

=== Licenses ===
- National Association of Securities Dealers (NASD) securities series licenses 6, 7, 8 and 22

== Awards and achievements ==
- 2019 Evansville Regional Business Hall of Fame laureate
- Institutional Investor's 2017 All American Executive Team Best Midcap CEOs, Technology, Media & Communication for the Software Sector
- 2012 Entrepreneurial Award from Marquette University's College of Business Administration

== Community involvement and philanthropy ==
In 2006, Stone funded the NJ Stone Baseball Field at Evansville Memorial High School, his alma mater. Stone named the field after his father.

In 2011, Stone announced a plan to bring 500 new jobs to his hometown, Evansville, Indiana, by 2014. The plan was seen as a boon to downtown Evansville and would add to SS&C Technologies’ roster at the time of 1,400 employees around the globe.

In May 2018, Stone and his wife Mary donated $15 million toward a multi-institutional initiative in downtown Evansville, Stone Family Center for Health Sciences. The center was a collaborative effort among the University of Evansville, the University of Southern Indiana and Indiana University to support health sciences programs.

In November 2018, Bill and Mary Stone helped fund the Patricia Browning Stone Sensory Playground at St. Vincent's Center for Children in Evansville. The playground, named after and dedicated to Stone's mother Patricia, provides therapy and treatment for kids suffering from Sensory Processing Disorder (SPD).

In December 2021, Bill and Mary Stone gifted $34.2 million to establish the Mary O'Daniel Stone and Bill Stone Center for Child and Adolescent Psychiatry at IU School of Medicine-Evansville.

== Media appearances ==
=== Forbes ===
In 2016, Forbes Staff Writer Jennifer Wang interviewed Stone about becoming a billionaire, the impact of the dot-com bubble burst on SS&C's business and how the company recovered from the dot-com fallout.

=== Mad Money, CNBC ===
In 2018, Stone sat down with Jim Cramer to talk about the growth in the financial technology space.

=== FTF News ===
In January 2019, Stone sat down with FTF (Financial Technologies Forum) News to provide his insights on SS&C's key acquisitions in 2018.
