= Donhee Ham =

South Korean electrical engineer

- 함돈희
- Citizenship: South Korea
- Education: Caltech; Seoul National University
- Scientific career
- Fields: Electronic Engineering; Applied Physics
- Workplaces: Harvard University; Samsung Electronics; LIGO
- Website: www.donheehamlab.org

Donhee Ham (Korean: 함돈희; Hanja: 咸燉憙) is the John A. and Elizabeth S. Armstrong Professor of Engineering and Applied Sciences at Harvard University.

== Biography and Work ==
Ham is from Busan, South Korea. He received his B.S. in physics from Seoul National University in 1996, graduating atop the College of Natural Sciences with Presidential Prize. After fulfilling his military duty in South Korea in 1997, he went to Caltech, where he earned his M.S. in physics in 1999 and his Ph.D. in electrical engineering in 2002. His PhD thesis on statistical physics of electrical circuits won the Caltech Charles Wilts Prize given to the best Electrical Engineering dissertation. He joined Harvard in 2002 as assistant professor, and became associate professor in 2006, John L. Loeb Associate Professor of the Natural Sciences in 2007, Gordon Mckay Professor of Applied Physics and Electrical Engineering in 2009, and the John A. and Elizabeth S. Armstrong Professor of Engineering and Applied Sciences in 2023. He was also a Fellow of Samsung Electronics from 2019 to 2024.

His research work is on CMOS-bio interface for neuroscience and biotechnology, machine intelligence and neuromorphic engineering, scalable nuclear magnetic resonance (NMR), integrated circuits, and beyond-CMOS electronics. Notable work includes: CMOS-neuroelectronic interfaces for massively parallel intracellular recording of mammalian neurons and their application in machine intelligence; CMOS-electrochemistry interfaces for biological cell screening and arrayed pH localization for high-throughput biomolecular synthesis; in-sensor and in-memory computing; NMR scaling that earned the MIT Technology Review Innovators Under 35 (TR35) recognition; integrated circuit design for analog AI computing, frequency generation and synthesis, microprocessor thermal monitoring, RF transceivers, image sensing, and electrochemical/biological interfaces; and low-dimensional electronics, such as graphene kinetic inductance measurements and light slowing by collective excitation of 2D electrons. Ham is also known for his teaching.
