= Quantopian =

Defunct American financial services provider

- Industry: Finance
- Founded: 2011
- Defunct: 2020
- Headquarters: Boston, Massachusetts, United States
- Key people: John Fawcett, CEO & cofounder; Jean Bredeche, CTO & cofounder
- Number of employees: 45 (2016)
- Website: www.quantopian.com

Quantopian was a company that aimed to create a crowd-sourced hedge fund by letting freelance quantitative analysts develop, test, and use trading algorithms to buy and sell securities.

In November 2020, Quantopian announced it would shut down after 9 years of operation.

== History ==
John Fawcett and Jean Bredeche founded Quantopian in 2011. Over its history, Quantopian raised $48.8M from investors such as Spark Capital, Khosla Ventures, Bessemer Venture Partners, Point72 Ventures, and Andreessen Horowitz. As of July 2016, the company consisted of 45 employees, up from 20 employees in January 2014 and 12 in January 2014. As of August 2018, the company had over 210,000 members compared to 85,000 in July 2016, 20,000 in May 2014, and 10,000 in October 2013. In July 2016, Steven A. Cohen, chief executive officer of Point72 Asset Management, announced his firm will put up to $250M under the direction of algorithms managed by Quantopian and make an investment in Quantopian itself. The company has funded individual algorithms with as much as $50,000,000. In February 2020, Quantopian announced it would return investors' money due to the underperformance of its investment strategies.

== Business Model ==
The company ran a two-sided market business model:

The first side consisted of algorithm-developer members who developed and tested for free, focusing on algorithm development for factors that can be added to Quantopian's offerings to institutional investors. It hosted contests called "Quantopian Open", where anyone could join and enter regardless of education or work experience. Quantopian provided them with free data sources and tools, largely built in the Python programming language.

The second side was institutional investors. These members had their investments managed by the winning algorithms. Successful developer-members could get a royalty or commission from investor-members, who profited from the former's algorithm used with larger resources > $1M. Board member Andrew Parker claimed that Quantopian aimed for modest number of users and a large average revenue per user (ARPU); more like Bloomberg than Facebook.

The business model capitalized on a trend jokingly dubbed "the latest DIY craze" by the Wall Street Journal.

Previously the company provided brokerage integrations to individual investors. These integrations were continued by the community who started the open source project Zipline-Live

In 2018, the company announced the availability of an enterprise software product for asset managers, in partnership with FactSet.

In 2015, Quantopian's Director of Products, Karen Rubin, used the service in a study that showed that a hypothetical portfolio of investments in women-led companies would perform three times better than an investment in an index fund based on the S&P 500 over the same period. Her study was inspired by a Credit Suisse’s Gender 3000 report, specifically that "Companies with more than one woman on the board have returned a compound 3.7% a year over those that have none..." and yet paradoxically only "12.7% of boards had gender diversity." Writing for Wired magazine, Fawcett proposed that Quantopian be used as a MOOC-like platform for higher education.

== Technology ==
Quantopian's web-based product was written in Python. Parts of the company's technology were available under an open source license, in particular, their backtesting engine dubbed "Zipline." The uploaded algorithms of users remained the trade secrets of the individual (unless the person chooses to publish them). The company claimed that its employees could not access the submitted algorithms (except in certain circumstances) and that protection was ensured by "alignment of interests". The company did however reserve the right to review the performance and other outputs of user's algorithms. Allowing users to run arbitrary code on its servers posed some unusual cyber-security challenges.

== Termination of services ==
In October 2020 CEO John Fawcett announced, "I'm sad to say that we will be winding down Quantopian's free community offering over the next couple of weeks and on November 14th, the community platform will be taken down.... We know this is short notice.... Crowd-sourcing alpha was a moonshot and I'm deeply thankful that we had the opportunity to pursue the dream together for 9 years."

After publishing the termination of its services for quants, the Quantopian team disclosed their intent to integrate with commission-free broker Robinhood Markets.

To fill the gap left by Quantopian, a number of traders have relied on open source projects like Gekko and Freqtrade. The first companies to capitalize on the gap left by Quantopian were CrunchDAO, QuantConnect, and Numerai. In recent years, a group of cloud-based tools has emerged to service the needs of quants with a specific focus on cryptocurrencies including 3commas, Mudrex, and Tuned.
