= History of Russia (1796–1855) =

The period from 1796 to 1855 in Russian history (covering the reigns of Paul I, Alexander I and Nicholas I) saw the Napoleonic Wars, government reform, political reorganization, and economic growth.

== War and peace, 1796–1825 ==
Catherine II died in 1796, and her son Emperor Paul I (r. 1796–1801) succeeded her. Painfully aware that Catherine had considered bypassing him to name his son, Alexander, as tsar, Paul instituted primogeniture in the male line as the basis for succession. It was one of the lasting reforms of Paul's brief reign. He also chartered a Russian-American Company, which eventually led to Russia's acquisition of Alaska. Paul limited landowner's right to serf labour to three days in a week, alleviating the condition of the serfs.

As a major European power, Russia could not escape the wars involving revolutionary and Napoleonic France. Paul became an adamant opponent of France, and Russia joined Britain and Austria in a war against France. In 1798–1799 Russian troops under one of the country's most famous generals, Aleksandr Suvorov, performed brilliantly, driving the French from Italy. On December 18, 1800, Paul unilaterally declared the neighboring kingdom of Kartli-Kakheti annexed to the Russian Empire. Paul's support for the ideals of the Knights Hospitaller (and his acceptance of the position of Grand Master) alienated many members of his court. He made peace with France in 1800 and established Second League of Armed Neutrality. Paul, who seems to have already been mentally unstable, alienated the powerful anti-French faction, and in March 1801, Paul was deposed and assassinated.

The new Tsar Alexander I of Russia (r. 1801–1825) came to the throne as the result of his father's murder, which he was implicated in. Groomed for the throne by Catherine II and raised in the spirit of enlightenment, Alexander also had an inclination toward romanticism and religious mysticism, particularly in the latter period of his reign. Alexander reorganized the central government, replacing the colleges that Peter the Great had set up with ministries, but without a coordinating prime minister.

Alexander was, perhaps, the most brilliant diplomat of his time, and his primary focus was not on domestic policy but on foreign affairs, and particularly on Napoleon. Fearing Napoleon's expansionist ambitions and the growth of French power, Alexander joined Britain and Austria against Napoleon. Napoleon defeated the Russians and Austrians at Austerlitz in 1805 and defeated the Russians at Friedland in 1807.

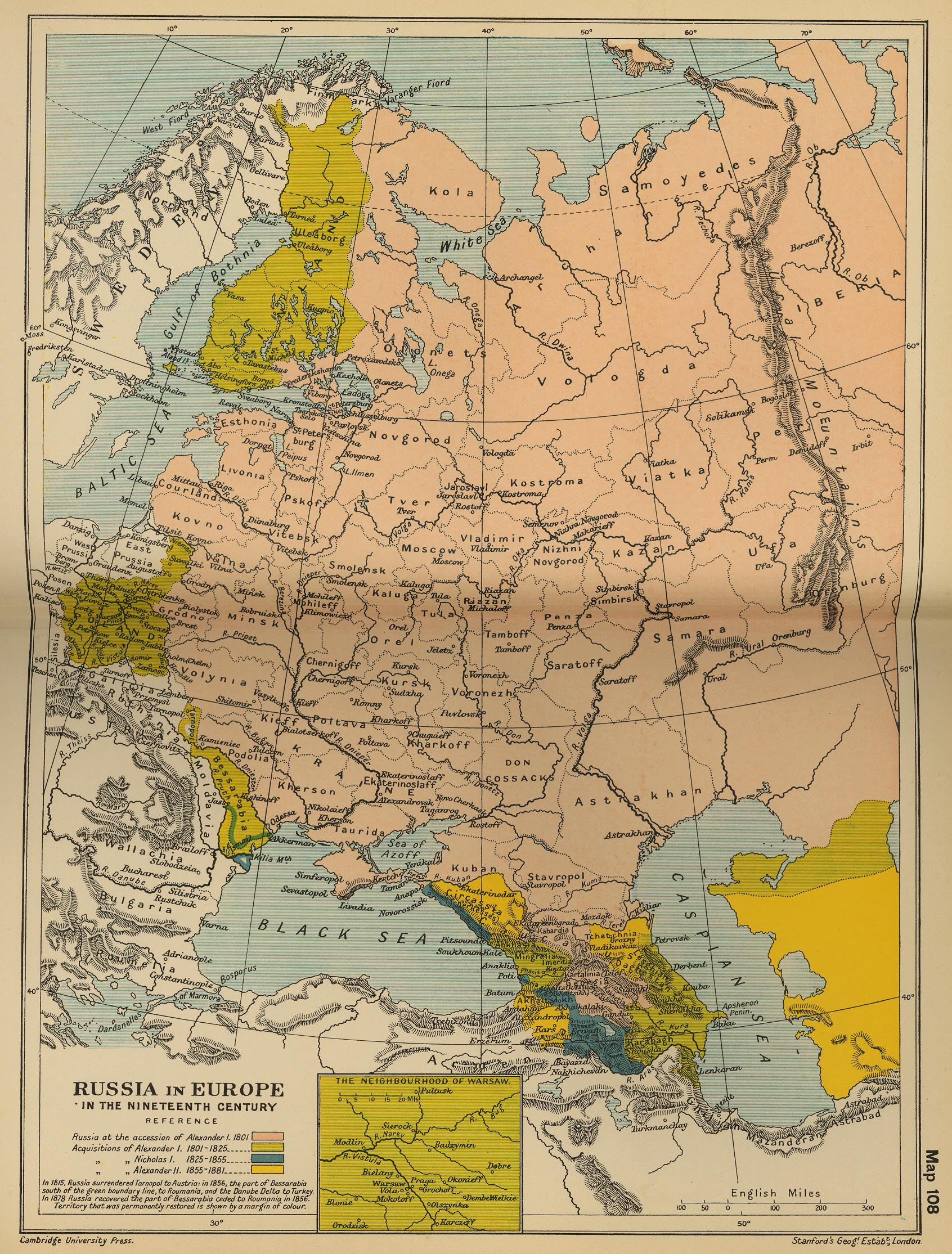
Expansion of Russia in XIXth century

After the Russian armies officially liberated allied Georgia from Persian occupation earlier in 1801, making Persia officially lose control over Georgia which it had been ruling for centuries, Alexander fought the Russo-Persian War (1804–1813), the first full-scale war against neighbouring Persia starting in 1804, over control and consolidation over Georgia, but also eventually Azerbaijan, Dagestan and the entire Caucasus in general, which was for large swaths of it an integral territory of Persia. With France Alexander was forced to sue for peace, and by the Treaty of Tilsit, signed in 1807, he became Napoleon's ally. Russia lost little territory under the treaty, and Alexander made use of his alliance with Napoleon for further expansion. By the Finnish War he annexed the eastern portion of Sweden, thereby forming the Grand Duchy of Finland in 1809, and acquired Bessarabia from Turkey as a result of the Russo-Turkish War (1806–1812).

Alexander was determined to acquire the disputed territories of major importance in the Caucasus and beyond. His predecessors had already waged wars against Persia, but they had not been able to consolidate Russian authority over the regions, resulting in the regions either being ceded back or being conquered back. After nine years of battle, Russia managed to bring the war to an end on highly favourable terms, completing Russian consolidation and suzerainty over major parts of the Caucasus including the gains of Dagestan, Georgia, most of Azerbaijan and other regions and territories in the Caucasus over Persia. By now, Russia had both full comfortable access to the Black Sea, and Caspian Sea and it would use these newly gained grounds for further wars against Persia and Turkey.

The Russo-French alliance gradually became strained. Napoleon was concerned about Russia's intentions in the strategically vital Bosporus and Dardanelles straits. At the same time, Alexander viewed the Duchy of Warsaw, the French-controlled reconstituted Polish state, with suspicion. The requirement of joining France's Continental Blockade against Britain was a serious disruption of Russian commerce, and in 1810 Alexander repudiated the obligation. In June 1812, Napoleon invaded Russia with 600,000 troops—a force twice as large as the Russian regular army. Napoleon hoped to inflict a major defeat on the Russians and force Alexander to sue for peace. As Napoleon pushed the Russian forces back, however, he became seriously overextended. Obstinate Russian resistance, members of which declared the Patriotic War, brought Napoleon a disastrous defeat: Less than 30,000 of his troops returned to their homeland. Victory came at a high cost though, as the areas of the country that the French army had marched through lay in ruins.

=== Congress of Vienna 1814–1815 ===
As the French retreated, the Russians pursued them into Central and Western Europe and to the gates of Paris. After the allies defeated Napoleon, Alexander became known as the savior of Europe, and he played a prominent role in the redrawing of the map of Europe at the Congress of Vienna in 1815. In the same year, Alexander initiated the creation of the Holy Alliance, a loose agreement pledging the rulers of the nations involved—including most of Europe—to act according to Christian principles. More pragmatically, in 1814 Russia, Britain, Austria, and Prussia had formed the Quadruple Alliance. When Napoleon suddenly reappeared, Russia was part of the alliance that chased him down. The conservative Bourbons were back in power in Paris and on good terms with Russia. The allies created an international system to maintain the territorial status quo and prevent the resurgence of an expansionist France. The Quadruple Alliance, confirmed by a number of international conferences, ensured Russia's influence in Europe.

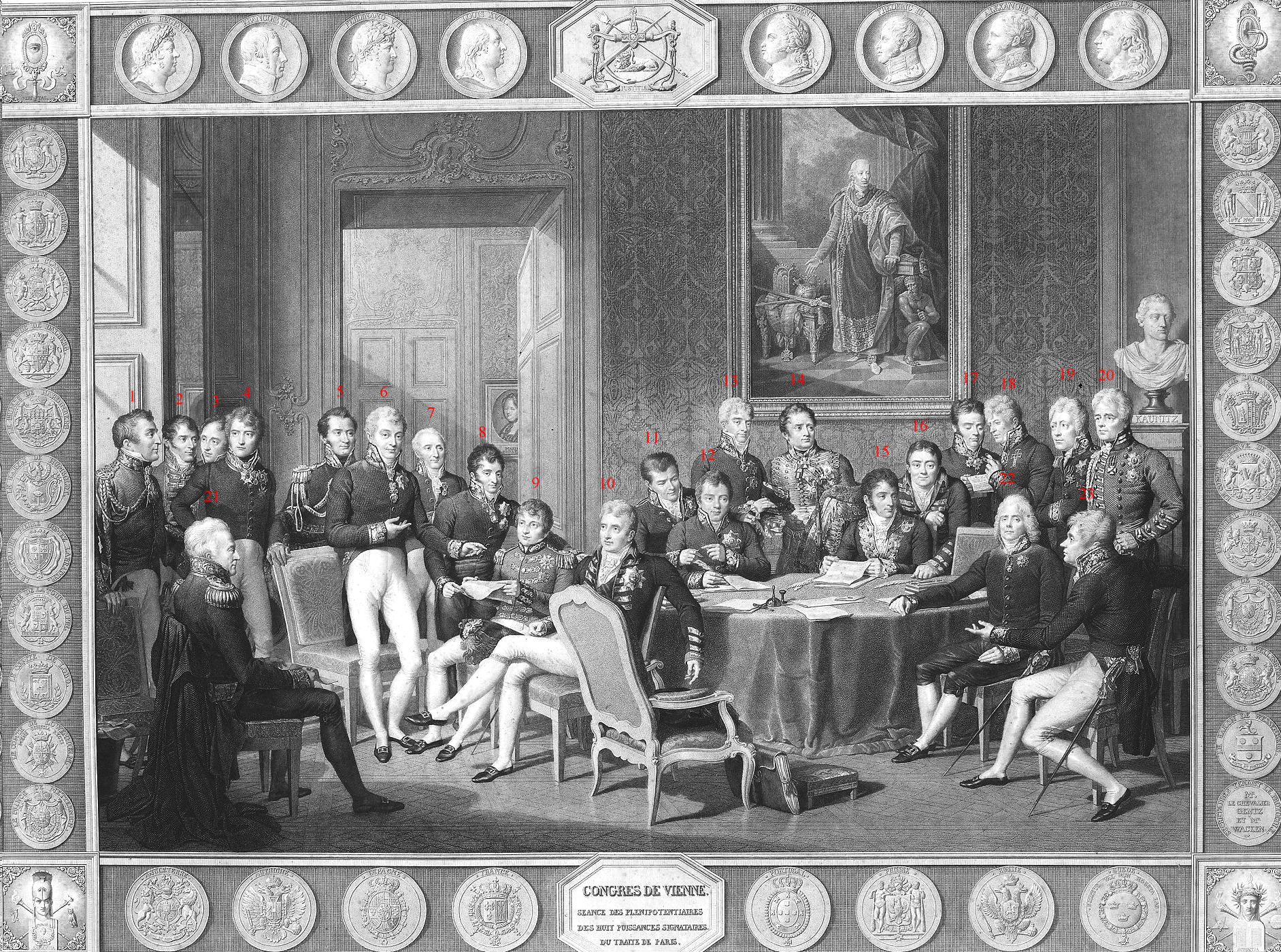
The Congress of Vienna by Jean-Baptiste Isabey, 1819

At the same time, Russia continued its expansion. The Congress of Vienna created the Congress Poland, to which Alexander granted a constitution. Thus, Alexander I became the constitutional monarch of Poland while remaining the autocratic tsar of Russia. He was also the monarch of Finland, which had been annexed in 1809 and awarded autonomous status.

Despite the liberal, romantic inclinations of his youth, Alexander I after 1815 grew steadily more conservative, isolated from the day-to-day affairs of the state, and inclined to religious mysticism. The lofty hopes that the tsar had once held for his country were frustrated by the immense size and backwardness of it. While vacationing on the Black Sea in 1825, Alexander fell ill with typhus and died at only 47, although there were unfounded stories that he faked his own death, became a monk, and wandered the Siberian wilderness for many years afterwards.

=== Decembrist revolt, 1825 ===
A revolutionary movement was born during the reign of Alexander I. The Decembrist revolt was an aristocratic movement, whose chief actors were army officers and members of the nobility. The reasons for Decembrist Uprising were manifold: opposition on part of the nobility to the regime that successfully limited their privileges through its peasant policy, spread among a section of young officers of liberal and even radical ideas, fears among nationalist section of society, inspired by Alexander perceived Polonofile policy (officers were particularly incensed that Alexander had granted Poland a constitution while Russia remained without one). Several clandestine organizations were preparing for an uprising after Alexander's death. There was confusion about who would succeed him because the next in line, his brother Constantine Pavlovich, had relinquished his right to the throne. A group of officers commanding about 3,000 men refused to swear allegiance to the new tsar, Alexander's brother Nicholas, proclaiming instead their loyalty to the idea of a Russian constitution. Because these events occurred in December 1825, the rebels were called Decembrists. Nicholas easily overcame the revolt, and the surviving rebels were exiled to Siberia.

== Nicholas I, 1825–1855 ==
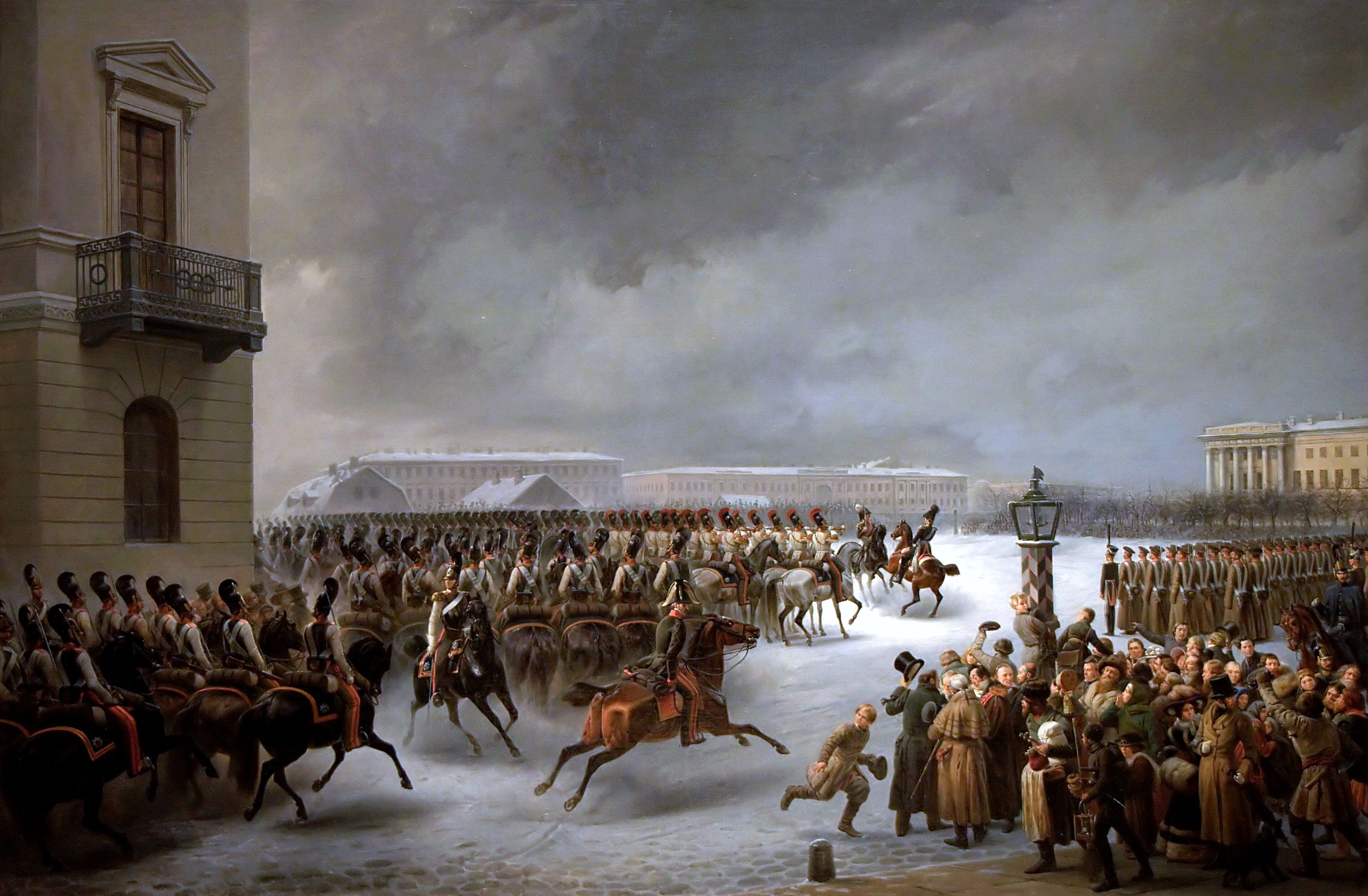
Life Guards Horse Regiment During the Uprising of December 14, 1825 at the Senate Square, by Vasily Timm

Tsar Nicholas I (1796–1855) succeeded his brother to the throne in 1825. He was completely devoid of Alexander's mystical, romantic pretensions, instead being a soldier at heart who felt most comfortable when reviewing troops. A cold, no-nonsense autocrat, Nicholas gave no serious thought to any sort of liberalism or political reforms, preferring to rule through the bureaucracy. Alexander had taken steps to improve and modernize the structure of the Russian state, adding a variety of new governmental departments to oversee agriculture, internal security, industrial and infrastructure development, and public health. He had also given thought at various times to creating a representative Parliament, which would not see fruition for a century. As noted above however, Russia proved such an immense, impoverished, and backwards nation that these departments had very little actual authority, in part due to lack of funds, also because of being stonewalled by the landowning nobility.

Nicholas continued these administrative innovations, but made the ministers responsible solely to him. Overall, the effect was to steadily centralize more and more power in the tsar's hands. In particular, the state security department (the Third Section) became an almost notorious symbol of repression as its primary aim was to prosecute subversive political activities. Nicholas for his part envisioned the Third Section as the champion of the poor and discriminated against the abuses of the wealthy and privileged, but although some men in the department were honest and took this duty seriously, most of them merely used it as a license to beat up and harass political and religious dissidents. The Third Section was also notorious for the bad relations it had with other governmental departments. Overall, the attempt at building a modern-style European bureaucracy that had begun under Peter the Great was a partial success. Bureaucrats believed that service to the state and the tsar constituted the highest possible calling, the result being that the ranks of the bureaucracy continued to grow by leaps and bounds. Prestige was the main attraction of employment in the bureaucracy, as salaries were small, and advancement through the ranks deliberately kept limited to prevent too many people, especially those of humble birth, from rising too fast. Only the most educated, cultured, and informed men became part of the tsar's inner circle of advisers.

The bureaucracy's numbers increased by threefold during the first half of the 19th century. Pay continued to be low due to the overall poverty of the Russian state. This was not only due to the country's backwards economy, but also because the nobility were tax-exempt and free from the expense of waging wars, not only the great ones, but the smaller campaigns in the Caucasus. Bureaucrats were for the most part uneducated, uninformed of their departments' respective tasks, and also phenomenally corrupt. Most hesitated to make decisions and preferred to push themselves up through the ranks, with the result that the tsar himself was forced to micromanage thousands of trivial affairs. Russia also suffered from a multitude of antiquated, contradictory, and discriminatory laws against Jews and minority Christian sects. Since not all minorities were part of the lower classes and many officials could not afford to feed their families, bribery was extremely widespread, and yet was probably the only thing that kept the Russian state from being even slower, more corrupt, and oppressive than it was.

The Decembrist uprising had increased Nicholas's distrust of the nobility and dislike of anything resembling political reform, even among the upper classes. Education gradually continued to improve after Alexander's creation of a universal educational system in 1804, although due to lack of funds the emphasis tended to be on the creation of universities rather than on primary and secondary schools. In the latter part of his reign, the Minister of Education, A.N. Golistyn, moved to censor and exclude the dangerous revolutionary and anti-clerical ideas coming from Western Europe. He encouraged college students to report their professors to the authorities if they expressed subversive views. Those professors so exposed were either fired or threatened with prosecution. In 1833, Count Sergey Ugarov took over as Minister of Education and pursued a more tolerant policy at the expense of excluding the children of the lower classes from universities.

Despite this, school attendance and literacy in Russia continued to increase and there began to form a rising middle class that was cosmopolitan in its outlook and connected with European culture and ideas. State censorship barred direct political dissent and the police were prone to harass even writers who did not involve themselves in politics. The great poet Alexander Pushkin was questioned by authorities in 1824 in part because he had befriended certain Decembrists. Eventually, despite some mistrust from the police, Pushkin was allowed to publish his works until he met an untimely end in 1837 after fighting a duel. The writers Mikhail Lermontov and Nikolai Gogol were also viewed with suspicion.

Censorship was not totally effective, especially as it varied depending on the personal views of each censor, some of whom tolerated liberal ideas. Philosophical arguments and literary criticism were popular ways of subtly expressing political opinions, and it was during this time that the great debate between "Westernizers" and "Slavophiles" emerged. This debate started in 1836 when Pyotr Chaadayev wrote a philosophical letter in the periodical Teleskop, which declared that:

"Standing alone in the world, we have given nothing to the world, we have learned nothing from the world, we have not added a single idea to the mass of human ideas, we have made no contribution to the progress of the human spirit, and everything that has come to us from that spirit, we have disfigured. Today we form a gap in the intellectual order."

Nicholas argued that Chaadayev must be insane to make such claims and sentenced him to house imprisonment with periodic visits from a doctor. This embarrassing but fairly mild treatment silenced him.

Nicholas appointed the veteran statesman count Speransky to preside over a commission for legal reform. This group in 1832 published the Russian Code of Law. Another of the measures was the reorganization of the State Bank and a general reform of financial matters. This was carried out by finance minister Yegor Kankrin. A secret police, the so-called Third Section, ran a network of spies and informers. The government exercised censorship and other controls over education, publishing, and all manifestations of public life.

In 1833, Minister of Education Sergey Uvarov devised a program of "Orthodoxy, Autocracy, and Nationality" as the guiding principle of the national education. The official emphasis on Russian nationalism contributed to a debate on Russia's place in the world, the meaning of Russian history, and the future of Russia. One group, the Modernizers, believed that Russia remained backward and primitive and could progress only through more Europeanization. Another group, the Slavophiles, enthusiastically favored the Slavs and their culture and customs, and had a distaste for Modernizers and their culture and customs. The Slavophiles viewed Slavic philosophy as a source of wholeness in Russia and looked askance at rationalism and materialism in the west part of Europe. Some of them believed that the Russian peasant commune, or mir, offered an attractive alternative to modern capitalism and could make Russia a potential social and moral savior. The Slavophiles could therefore be said to represent a form of Russian messianism.

Russia experienced a flowering of literature and the arts. Through the works of Aleksandr Pushkin, Nikolai Gogol, Ivan Turgenev, and numerous others, Russian literature gained international stature and recognition. Ballet took root in Russia after its importation from France, and classical music became firmly established with the compositions of Mikhail Glinka (1804–1857).

Saint Petersburg – Tsarskoe Selo Railway and Moscow – Saint Petersburg Railway were constructed.

Nicholas I made some efforts to improve the lot of the state peasants with the help of the minister Pavel Kiselev and set up committee to prepare a law liberating serfs, but did not abolish serfdom during his reign.

In foreign policy, Nicholas I acted as the protector of ruling legitimism and guardian against revolution. In 1830, after a popular uprising had occurred in France, the Poles in Russian Poland revolted. Poles resented limitation of the privileges of the Polish minority in the lands, annexed by Russia in the 18th century and sought to reestablish the 1772 borders of Poland. Nicholas crushed the rebellion, abrogated the Polish constitution, and reduced Congress Poland to the status of a Russian province, Privislinsky Krai.

In 1848, when a series of revolutions convulsed Europe, Nicholas intervened on behalf of the Habsburgs and helped suppress an uprising in Hungary, and he also urged Prussia not to accept a liberal constitution. Having helped conservative forces repel the specter of revolution, Nicholas I seemed to dominate Europe.

While Nicholas was attempting to maintain the status quo in Europe, he adopted an aggressive policy towards the Ottoman Empire. Nicholas I was following the traditional Russian policy of resolving the so-called Eastern Question by seeking to partition the Ottoman Empire and establish a protectorate over the Orthodox population of the Balkans, still largely under Ottoman control in the 1820s. Russia fought a successful war with the Ottomans in 1828 and 1829. Russia attempted to expand at the expense of the Ottoman Empire and Qajar Persia by using Georgia at its base for the Caucasus and Anatolian front. In 1826 another war was fought against Persia, and despite losing almost all recently consolidated territories in the first year of the battle in the first year of the Persian invasion, Russia managed to bring an end to the war on highly favourable terms in the second part of the war, including the official gains of Armenia, Nakhchivan, Nagorno-Karabakh, Azerbaijan, and Iğdır Province, having by now conquered most of the Persian territories in the Caucasus and therefore setting the way fully open to push deeper into Persia and Ottoman Turkey. In 1828 in the same year the war with Persia ended, another war against Turkey, its other territorial rival, started. Nicholas invaded northeastern Anatolia and occupied the strategic Ottoman towns of Erzurum and Gumushane and, posing as protector and saviour of the Greek Orthodox population, receiving extensive support from the region's Pontic Greeks. Following a brief occupation, the Russian imperial army withdrew back into Georgia.

By the London Straits Convention of 1841, the Western powers affirmed Ottoman control over the straits and forbade any power, including Russia, to send warships through the straits. Based on his role in suppressing the revolutions of 1848 and his mistaken belief that he had British diplomatic support, Nicholas moved against the Ottomans, who declared war on Russia in 1853. Fearing the results of an Ottoman defeat by Russia, in 1854 Britain and France joined the Crimean War on the Ottoman side. Austria offered the Ottomans diplomatic support, and Prussia remained neutral, leaving Russia without allies on the continent. The European allies landed in Crimea and laid siege to the well-fortified Russian base at Sevastopol. After a year's siege the base fell. Nicholas I died before the fall of Sevastopol', but he already had recognized the failure of his regime. Russia now faced the choice of initiating major reforms or losing its status as a major European power.

== Notes ==
The first draft of this article was taken with little editing from the Library of Congress Federal Research Division's Country Studies series. As their home page at http://lcweb2.loc.gov/frd/cs/cshome.html says, "Information contained in the Country Studies On-Line is not copyrighted and thus is available for free and unrestricted use by researchers. As a courtesy, however, appropriate credit should be given to the series." Please leave this statement intact so that credit can be given to the now changed first draft.
