= David C. Roy =

American sculptor

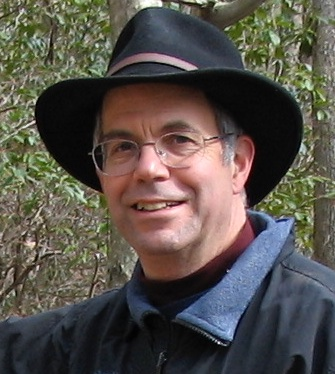
- David C. Roy, Kinetic Sculptor in 2006
- Born: 1952 (age 73–74)
- Education: Boston University
- Known for: Spring-driven kinetic sculptures of wood
- Notable work: Dimensions - capable of running 40 hours on a single wind
- Movement: Kinetic art
- Spouse(s): Marji Roy, 1974-present
- Relatives: Karen Rubin (daughter)
- Website: woodthatworks.com

David C. Roy is a kinetic sculptor. He has designed over 150 different moving sculptures and produced one-of-a-kind or limited edition instances of each: In total he has hand-built thousands of pieces.

== Education and career ==
Roy's father was an aeronautical engineer working on jet engines, and as a boy he was interested in invention and science. In 1974, Roy received a degree in physics from Boston University and then got a job as a computer programmer for an insurance company until becoming a sculptor in 1975. The idea for the career direction came from his wife-to-be, Marji, who was at the time an art student in sculpture at Rhode Island School of Design.

His sculptures, which are mainly made from laminated Baltic birch hardwood, are not timepieces but they do include clockwork-like mechanisms such as escapements, suspended weights, counter-weights, and (more recently) constant force springs. They are not electrically powered because an important connection is that the viewer winds the piece by hand. The run time of early models was about 30 minutes, but he has refined the technique to the point that some run up to 40 hours on a single full wind. Many include the moving moiré pattern from co-axial spoked wheels rotating in opposite directions. Roy focuses not only on the motion but also the sound. He has developed escapements that are either nearly silent or that produce the soft clicking of wood on wood. A few incorporate wind chime tubes. In the beginning he hand drew his schematics, but he has gradually migrated to computer-assisted design and animation.

His studio is in Ashford, Connecticut.

== Reception ==
His work has been displayed since the late 1970s in science and art museums, in art galleries, and is in corporate and private collections around the world. His work and life has been covered in publications including The New York Times, Discover magazine, the Hartford Courant, and the Boston Globe. Writing for the Baltimore Evening Sun, Carl Schoettler waxed poetically that "Echo ... looks like a spinning wheel for ghost tales at midnight. Serendipity ... might measure rainbows." Bill Aller of the New York Times found them "intriguing." A turning point in Roy's career was acceptance to exhibit at the Northeast Craft Fair in Rhinebeck, New York. Reviewing this exhibit at the 1979 show, Nancy Pappas of the Hartford Courant was impressed with the sculptures' "silent, hypnotic motion." In the Journal Inquirer Richard Tamling wrote about the "...constantly shifting relationships among shapes - as occurs in mobiles - as well as motion and sound In InformArt Magazine, Tyler Chartier found the moving parts create "...wondrous patterns that spin, swirl, flutter, and undulate in the most entrancing ways." Writing for American Woodturner Journal, Peter Rand observed that the motion in the pieces is "...intriguing in its sequence, which is infused with rhythm and evolves over time."

In 2020, Roy was interviewed about his art by Wired.

== Gallery ==
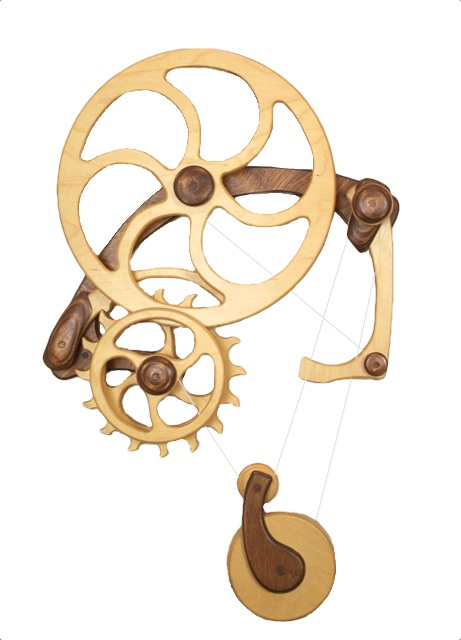
Inventor Released was the third kinetic sculpture from the beginning of his career in 1976. It was weight driven and reflects his goal to make sustained motion in a sculpture.

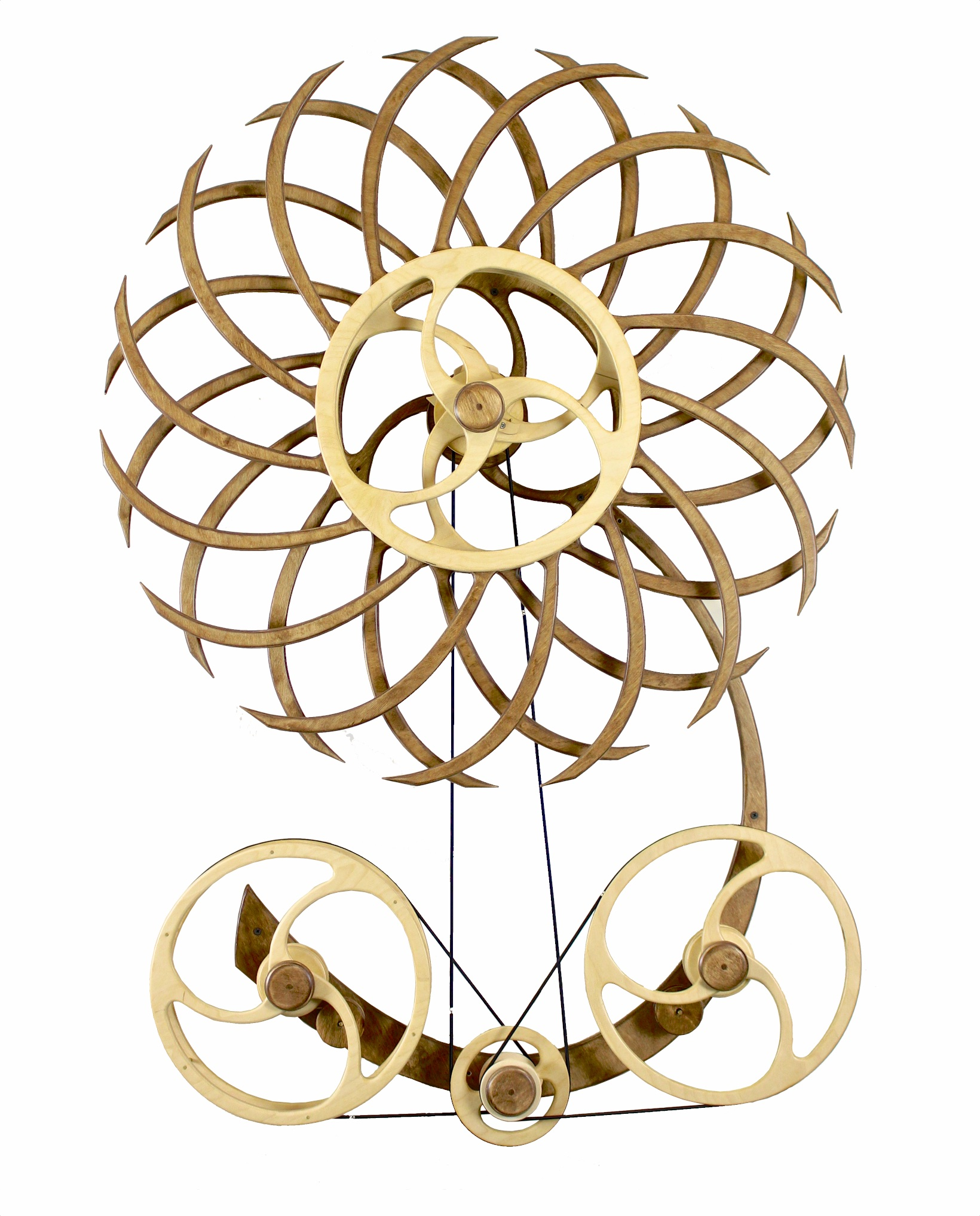
Dimensions is a spring-driven kinetic sculpture designed in 2015. A three-dimensional torus appears in the patterning wheels when the correct directions and speeds are reached.

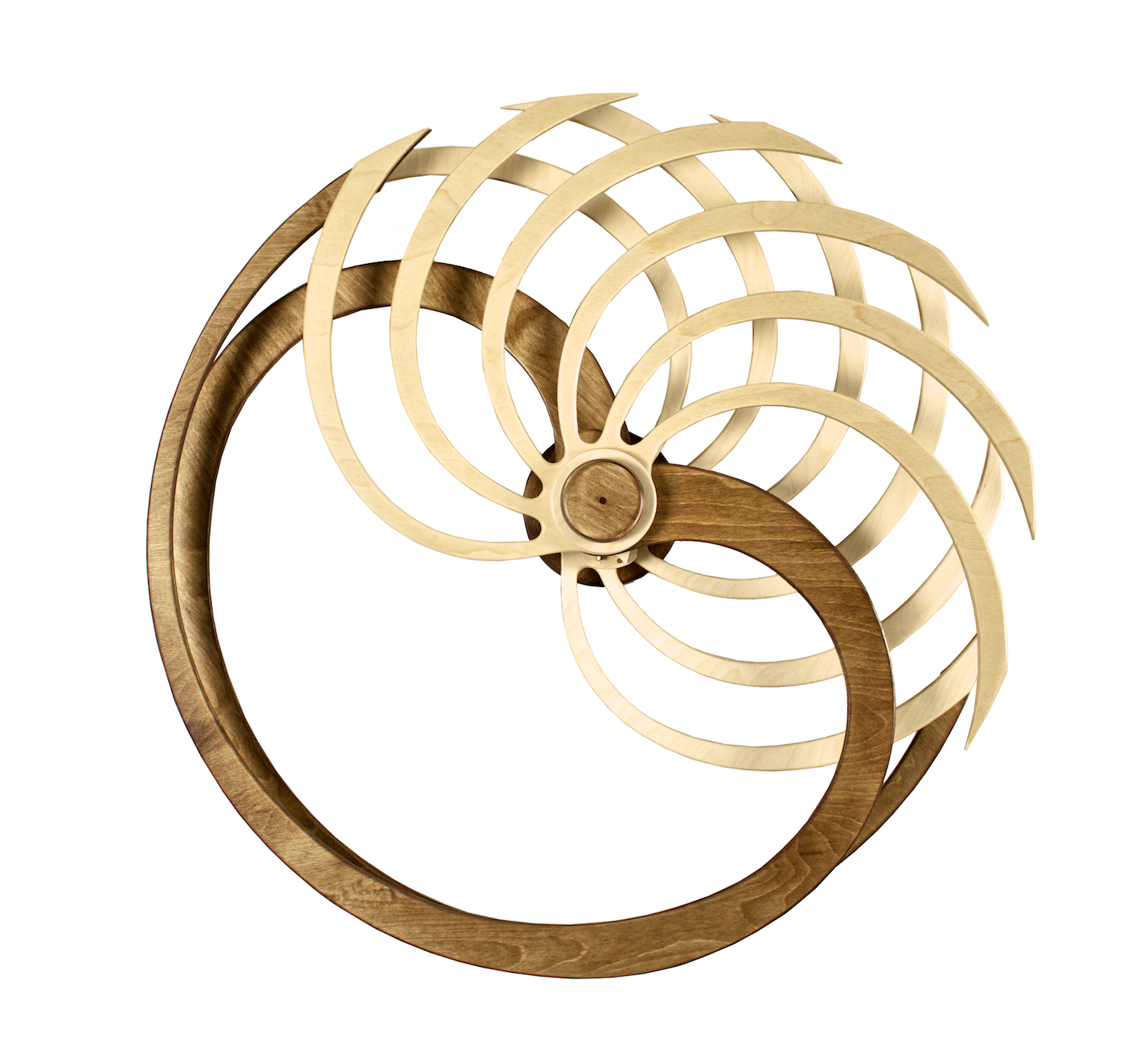
Nautilus is a spring-driven kinetic sculpture designed in 2014. It features visually interesting complex and varied motion from a simple mechanism.

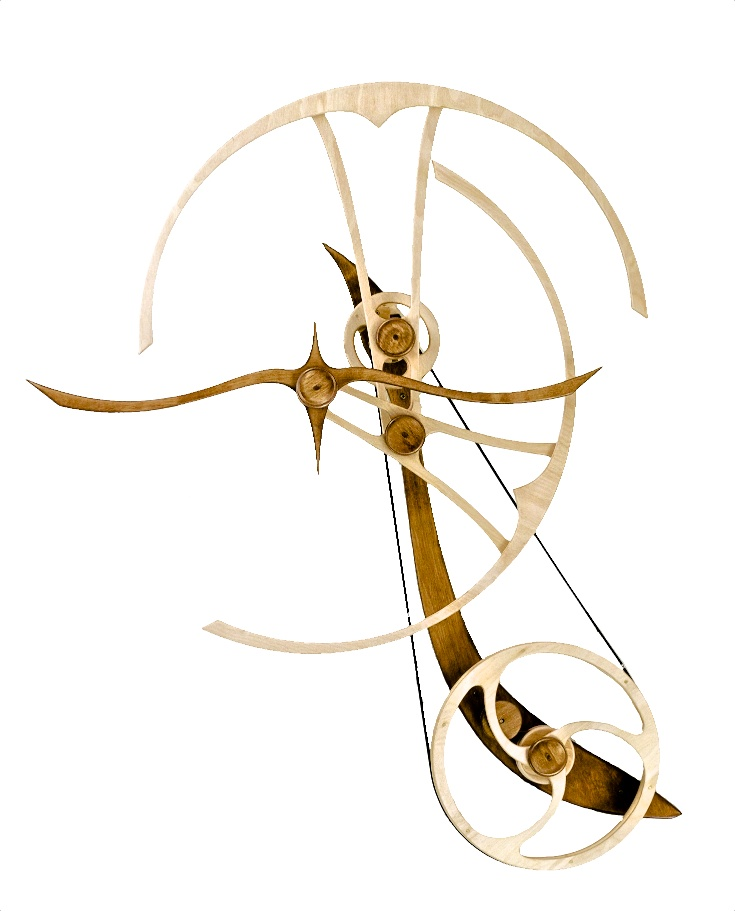
Solo is a spring-driven kinetic sculpture designed in 2014. The motion of flight has been a recurring theme in his work first appearing in 1988 in a sculpture called Flight.

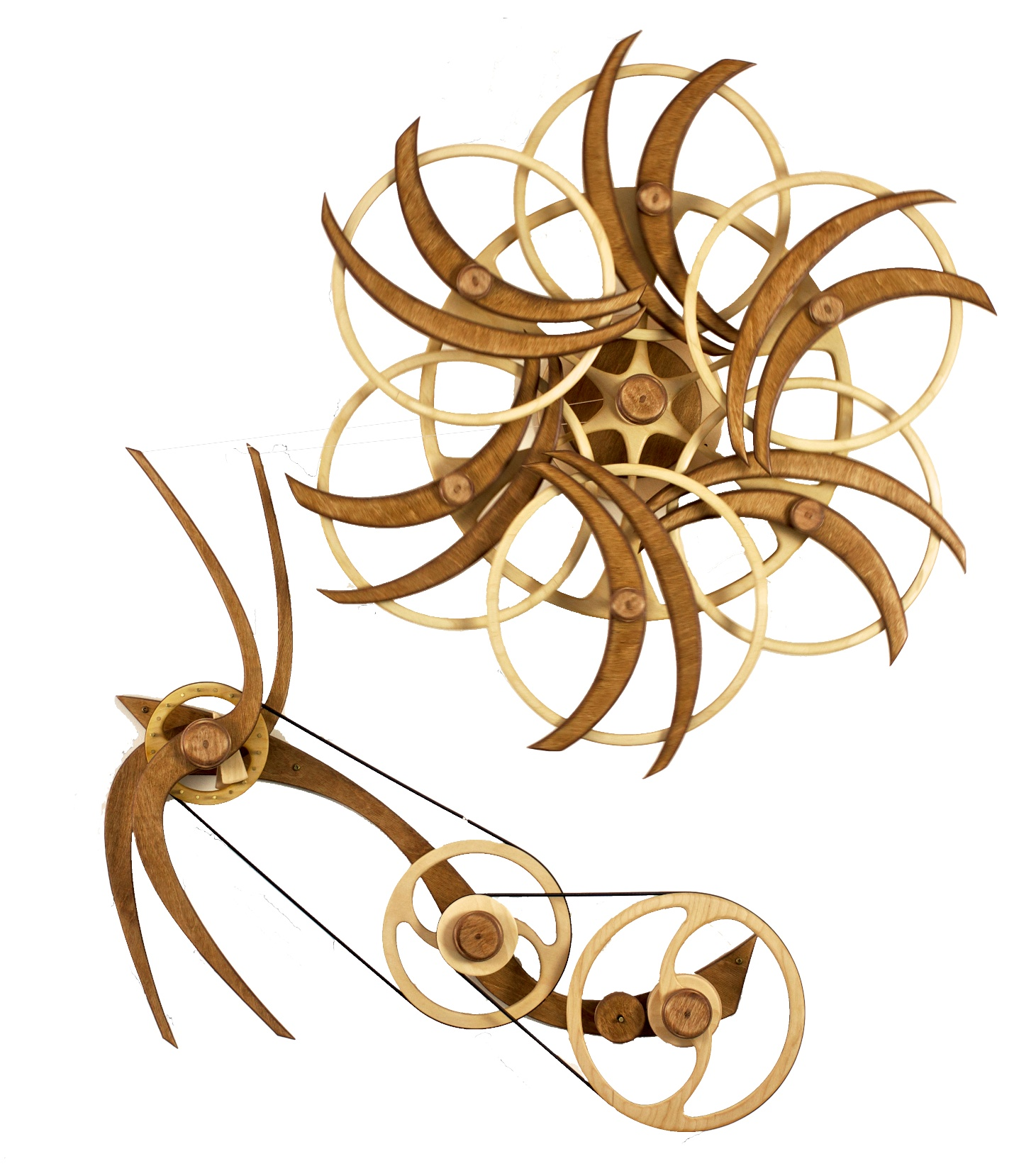
Variation II Sun is a spring-driven kinetic sculpture designed in 2014. Roy has been inspired by kaleidoscopic patterning throughout his career.
