= DST Systems =

United States technology company

DST Systems, Inc.
- Type: Subsidiary
- Industry: Business Services
- Founded: Incorporated in 1969
- Headquarters: Kansas City, Missouri, United States
- Key people: Stephen C. Hooley, Chairman/CEO/President
- Products: Banking, Insurance, Wealth management, Healthcare
- Revenue: $ 2.825 billion U.S. dollars (2015)
- Number of employees: 13,420 (2016)
- Parent: SS&C Technologies
- Website: dstsystems.com

DST Systems, Inc. is an American company that was acquired by SS&C Technologies in 2018. The company provided advisory, technology and operations outsourcing services to the financial services and healthcare industries. It was founded in February 1969 as Data·Sys·Tance, a subsidiary of Kansas City Southern Industries (KCSI) and is headquartered in Kansas City, Missouri, United States. As of 2016, DST employed 13,420 people worldwide.

== History ==
In 2005 and 2006, DST acquired CSC's Health Plan Solutions group and Amisys Synertech, Inc.

On January 11, 2018, SS&C Technologies Holdings, Inc. announced that it would acquire all outstanding DST stock at a share price of $84.

== Expansion, partnerships and acquisitions ==
On February 24, 2016, DST completed an acquisition of alternative fund service provider Kaufman Rossin Fund Services (KRFS).

March 27, 2017, DST to acquire remaining interest in Joint Ventures, Boston Financial Data Services, Inc. (BFDS) and International Financial Data Services Limited ("IFDS U.K."), from State Street Corporation.

May 7, 2017, DST Systems reported a share repurchase program worth $300 million.

January 11, 2018, SS&C acquired DST Systems for $84 per share in cash for an enterprise value of $5.4 billion, including assumption of debt.
