= Mary Zirin =

American scholar of Russian literature and advocate (1932–2019)

- Born: Mary Noble Fleming; September 4, 1932; Harrisburg, Pennsylvania
- Died: February 4, 2019 (aged 86); Pasadena, California
- Other names: Mary F. Zirin, Mary Fleming Zirin
- Education: University of Colorado Boulder; University of California, Los Angeles
- Occupations: Writer and women's scholar
- Spouse: Harold Zirin (m. 1957; died 2012)
- Children: 2

Mary Zirin (née Fleming; September 4, 1932 – February 4, 2019) was an American scholar of Russian literature and an advocate for Slavic women's studies, who is remembered for her translations of Russian manuscripts and compilations of bibliographies of Slavic women. Her works, Dictionary of Russian Women Writers (1994) and Women and Gender in Central and Eastern Europe, Russia, and Eurasia: A Comprehensive Bibliography (2007) have become standard references in the field. In the 1980s, she founded the Women East-West newsletter, which became the press organ of the Association for Women in Slavic Studies in 1989. Zirin established a scholarship fund for the Slavic Reference Service of the University of Illinois and with her husband endowed a chair in pulmonary biology in Colorado at National Jewish Health. The Mary Zirin Prize, created in her honor in 1999, is an annual award given by the Association for Women in Slavic Studies to promote independent scholarship.

== Early life and education ==
Mary Noble Fleming was born on September 4, 1932, in Harrisburg, Pennsylvania to Mary (née Noble) and Roscoe Bain Fleming. (Note: The Los Angeles Times gives the birth year of 1933.) Her mother, who attended Indiana University, was a high school teacher. Her father was an award-winning newspaper columnist who wrote for The Baltimore Sun, The Christian Science Monitor, Scripps-Howard Newspapers, and The Denver Post, among others. Because of his work, the family moved from Pennsylvania to Texas and then settled in Denver, Colorado, where Mary graduated from high school. She enrolled at the University of Colorado Boulder, where she graduated with a B.A. in art history in 1953.

Completing her education, Fleming joined the Women's Army Corps and served for three years in Paris, France. She returned to the United States and began working at the High Altitude Observatory in Boulder, where she met Harold Zirin, an astronomer employed at the facility. The couple married on April 20, 1957. From 1961 to 1964, she was a teaching associate in the department of Slavic and Eastern languages at the University of Colorado. She completed a M.A. at the University of Colorado in 1962. Zirin and her husband moved to Altadena, California, in 1964. They subsequently adopted two children, whom she raised while attending the University of California, Los Angeles. Zirin completed her dissertation, Prišvin and the Chain of Kaščej in 1971, earning a Ph.D. in Russian linguistics. Thomas A. Eekman served as chairman of her doctoral committee.

== Career ==
From 1969 to 1973, Zirin lectured in Russian language at the California Institute of Technology. She also lectured at Occidental College in Los Angeles, before becoming an independent scholar and freelance translator. Interested in women's studies, she translated works of Russian women writers and Russian manuscripts about women. Her 1988 translation of the memoirs of Nadezhda Durova, a Russian woman who served in the Russian cavalry during the Napoleonic Wars, was well regarded. Scholar Ronald D. LeBlanc noted that she avoided the translation errors of previous versions of the work, and provided an introduction setting Durova's life in context, making it "truly a pleasure to read". Linda Edmondson of the University of Birmingham called it a "delight" and noted that she captured Durova's own style.

In the 1970s, Zirin presented a paper, "Forgotten Russian Women Writers: 1830–1890" at a conference of the American Association of Teachers of Slavic and East European Languages. That presentation led her to meet Barbara Heldt and other scholars who shared her interest in uncovering forgotten writers. Gathering thousands of names, in 1994, along with Marina Ledkowsky and Charlotte Rosenthal, Zirin compiled the Dictionary of Russian Women Writers. The first compilation published on Russian literary women since 1889, it provided biographical sketches of 448 Russian writers who were active from the eighteenth through the twentieth centuries. Zirin wrote and edited entries on writers who preceded 1885, Rosenthal handled authors active between 1885 and 1925, and Ledkovsky worked on the authors writing after 1925. Robin Bisha of Kalamazoo College called Zirin's work "pathbreaking", and dubbed it an "impeccable" and "valuable reference tool". Joanna Hubbs of Hampshire College, found the compilation "groundbreaking", but lamented that the scope of the work required omissions of some notable writers and that some of the entries lacked adequate assessments of their works. Research scholar and editor of Northern Illinois University Press's Russian Studies Series, Christine Worobec commented that the work was a "classroom staple" at the time of Zirin's death.

From 1980, Zirin participated in the summer research lab hosted by the Russian and East European Center at the University of Illinois Urbana-Champaign. In order to allow scholars to share research, in 1986 she established and served as editor of the newsletter Women East-West. Three years later, the newsletter became the official organ of the Association for Women in Slavic Studies, founded in 1989. During her tenure as editor, which lasted until 1998, she regularly published bibliographies to assist scholars with their work. In 2007, she collected the bibliographic material from the newsletter and expanded it with other scholars publishing the two-volume work, Women and Gender in Central and Eastern Europe, Russia, and Eurasia: A Comprehensive Bibliography. Irina Livezeanu and June Pachuta Farris edited Volume One, while Zirin and Worobec were responsible for Volume Two. David Ransel of Stanford University described it as the first work of its kind, presenting a "comprehensive, multidisciplinary and multilingual bibliography", giving materials for territories of the former Habsburg, German, Ottoman, and Russian Empires and the Kingdom of Greece.

The guide highlighted critical sources and publications to allow an interdisciplinary analysis of available material for scholars focusing on women and gender in Eastern Europe and Eurasia. Jill Rosenshield a curator for the Special Collections department at the University of Wisconsin–Madison Libraries, noted that weighing 10.9 pounds, the volumes were difficult to use and would benefit from being digitized. Organizing the data by era and country, which included a section on diasporic and stateless persons such as Roma and Jews, Rosenshield verified the meticulous citations and praised them as models. Because the editors provided extensive English notes, users could tell at a glance if available sources had been translated or were available only in the native language. She also called the work "indispensable" for scholars, but noted that it probably was not as beneficial to general readers or students. It has become a standard reference and was reissued as an e-book by Routledge in 2015.

== Death and legacy ==
At the time of her death on February 4, 2019, Zirin was living in Pasadena, California. She had established a scholarship fund for the Slavic Reference Service of the University of Illinois, and with her husband endowed a chair in pulmonary biology in Colorado at National Jewish Health in 2005. The Mary Zirin Prize, created in her honor in 1990, is an annual award given by the Association for Women in Slavic Studies to promote independent scholarship. The Slavic Reference Service has created a searchable database for her bibliographies which did not appear in her principal publications. The newsletter Women East-West remains an active publication and became digital in 2012.

== Selected works ==
- Zirin, Mary Fleming (1971). Prišvin and the Chain of Kaščej (PhD). Los Angeles, California: University of California, Los Angeles. OCLC 320011686. ProQuest 302461412.
- Durova, Nadezhda A. (1988). The Cavalry Maiden: Journals of a Russian Officer in the Napoleonic Wars. Translated by Zirin, Mary Fleming. Bloomington, Indiana: Indiana University Press. ISBN 978-0-253-31372-0.
- Zirin, Mary F. (1994). "Women's Prose Fiction in the Age of Realism". In Clyman, Toby W.; Greene, Diana (eds.). Women Writers in Russian Literature. Westport, Connecticut: Greenwood Press. pp. 77–94. ISBN 978-0-313-27521-0.
- Ledkowsky, Marina; Rosenthal, Charlotte; Zirin, Mary, eds. (1994). Dictionary of Russian Women Writers. Westport, Connecticut: Greenwood Press. ISBN 978-0-313-26265-4.
- Zirin, Mary; Worobec, Christine D., eds. (2007). Women & Gender in Central and Eastern Europe, Russia, and Eurasia: A Comprehensive Bibliography. Vol. 2. Armonk, New York: M.E. Sharpe. ISBN 978-0-7656-0737-9.
