= Harold Zirin =

American astronomer (1929–2012)

- Born: October 7, 1929; Boston, Massachusetts
- Died: January 3, 2012 (aged 82); Pasadena, California, U.S.
- Education: Harvard University, Harvard University
- Spouse: Mary Zirin (m. 1957)
- Children: 2
- Scientific career
- Doctoral advisor: Philip M. Morse (MIT)

Harold "Hal" Zirin (October 7, 1929 – January 3, 2012) was an American solar astronomer also known as Captain Corona to a generation of Caltech Astronomy students.

== Life ==
Most content from 1998 interview with Zirin

Born in 1929 to immigrants from Russia and Austro-Hungary in Boston, Zirin grew up in Bridgeport, Connecticut. While attending Bassick High School, Zirin's home-built telescope won him a Westinghouse Prize, a Pepsi-Cola Scholarship, and scholarships to Harvard University as class of 1946 Valedictorian. Zirin earned his Bachelor of Science from Harvard in Applied Physics (1950) and completed his Astronomy Ph.D. in 1953. During his college years, Zirin played for the Harvard football team, participated in the hammer throw, and spent his summers working on the family's chicken farm in Vineland, New Jersey.

After a brief stint at Rand Corporation in Santa Monica, where he could not obtain clearance due to his father's association and membership in the Communist Party, Zirin returned to Harvard as a teaching fellow.

Harold Zirin moved to Colorado to work at the High Altitude Observatory, which specialized in solar research, in 1954, where he met his wife, Mary Noble Fleming, and married in 1957. Harold and Mary adopted a son in 1963 and a daughter in 1964 shortly before moving to Altadena, California, to start his professorship with Caltech.

Zirin's zeal and infectious enthusiasm in the study of the sun led his Caltech astronomy students in the 1970s (led by David Brin and Dick Trtek) to produce comic books and graffiti on construction fences of Zirin as a mild-mannered professor who transformed into the super-hero Captain Corona whenever he stepped into a solar observatory. Captain Corona (Zirin in a super-hero body-suit with cape and beret), seated with a small telescope in the flatbed of the observatory truck, took part one year in the Old Miners Day Parade at Big Bear.

Zirin was also fluent in several languages including German and Russian.

After retiring from Caltech in 1998, Harold and Mary Zirin provided funding to National Jewish Health in 2005 for an Endowed Chair in Pulmonary Biology. Harold died on January 3, 2012, after a prolonged battle with COPD.

== Work ==
Most content from 1998 interview with Zirin

In 1953, Zirin briefly worked for the RAND Corporation in southern California before returning to Harvard for a teaching fellowship.

In 1954, Zirin moved to Boulder, Colorado, to work at the High Altitude Observatory located in Climax, Colorado, which specialized in observing the sun.

In 1960–1961, in perhaps the first exchange with the U.S. that the Soviet Union permitted outside major Soviet cities, Harold and his wife, Mary, traveled by car to the Crimean Astrophysical Observatory. Zirin's six months there gave him hands-on experience with a solar telescope that convinced him of the necessity of continuous, fine-scale observations to solve the great riddle of the sun: how a 6,000 degree Fahrenheit apparent surface temperature (the “photosphere” or apparent surface of roiling gases) could rise to over a million degrees in the corona (the apparent atmosphere above the surface).

In 1964, Zirin accepted his dream job of Astrophysics Professor at the California Institute of Technology. After a sustained search of varied sites all over Southern California, undertaken at the instigation and support of physicist Robert Leighton, he chose to build an observatory near the north shore of Big Bear Lake, where placing the telescope surrounded by water would minimize the heat distortions arising from the ground (a common drawback in other solar observatories). Entrepreneurial in spirit, with a small grant from Caltech and money from the Fleischmann Foundation, Zirin built supporting facilities on shore, a dome on an island in the lake (though a year or so later, a causeway was built, connecting the island to the shore, as it remains), and built the telescopes for observing. Despite Zirin's driving nature, the Big Bear Solar Observatory had a congenial atmosphere, and there were always summer positions for students. Their usefulness led Zirin to propose to Caltech what became the extremely successful Summer Undergraduate Research Fellowship (SURF) program. Zirin also had a series of multi-year post-doctoral fellows.

In 1967, Zirin wrote the college text The Solar Atmosphere. In 1988, Zirin wrote the college text Astrophysics of the Sun. In addition, Zirin published about 250 research papers during his tenure at Caltech. Zirin also played a major role in solar research at the Caltech-operated Owens Valley Radio Observatory in the 1970s and helped develop a solar interferometer. He was also active in planning for NASA's High Resolution Solar Observatory, which was never built.

On March 24, 1992, NOVA broadcast titled Eclipse of the Century aired featuring Harold Zirin and the 1991 solar eclipse from the observatory on top of Mauna Kea, Hawaii. Zirin was frequently interviewed by local and national media relating to solar activity or eclipses.

In 1997, control of BBSO was moved from Caltech to the New Jersey Institute of Technology just prior to Harold Zirin's retirement from Caltech in 1998.
