= SS&C Advent =

American financial software company, 1983–2015

- Formerly: Advent Software
- Type: Subsidiary of SS&C Technologies
- Industry: Financial software, investment management
- Founded: 1983 in San Francisco, California
- Founder: Stephanie DiMarco; Steve Strand
- Fate: Acquired by SS&C Technologies, 2015
- Headquarters: San Francisco, California, United States
- Products: Geneva, Moxy, APX
- Parent: SS&C Technologies
- Website: www.advent.com

SS&C Advent, formerly Advent Software, is a business unit of SS&C Technologies providing portfolio management and accounting software to investment managers, hedge funds, family offices and wealth management firms. Advent Software was founded in San Francisco in 1983 by Stephanie DiMarco and Steve Strand and was publicly traded on NASDAQ (ticker: ADVS) until its acquisition. SS&C Technologies acquired Advent Software on 8 July 2015 and rebranded it as SS&C Advent.

== History ==
Advent Software was founded in 1983 and grew to become a leading provider of software for investment management operations. Its flagship product, Geneva, is a portfolio accounting and reporting system used by hedge funds, fund administrators and institutional asset managers to track positions, calculate performance and produce investor reports. Moxy is an order management system used for trading workflow.

Stephanie DiMarco served as president and CEO from founding until June 2012, when she stepped down and was succeeded by Peter Hess. By 2014 the company reported annual revenue of approximately US$387 million.

SS&C Technologies acquired Advent Software for approximately $2.7 billion, completing the transaction on 8 July 2015. The business was integrated into SS&C's broader suite of financial services software and continues to operate under the SS&C Advent brand.

== Products ==
- Geneva — portfolio accounting, reporting and data management for hedge funds and institutional managers
- Moxy — order management system for buy-side trading desks
- APX — portfolio management and client reporting for wealth management firms
