= William H. Kent =

American politician (1823–1889)

William Henry Kent

11th Mayor of Charlestown, Massachusetts
- In office 1870–1873
- Preceded by: Eugene L. Norton
- Succeeded by: Jonathan Stone

Member of the Charlestown, Massachusetts Board of Aldermen Ward 2
- In office 1865–1868

Personal details
- Born: March 21, 1823 Duxbury, Massachusetts
- Died: February 7, 1889 Charlestown, Massachusetts
- Spouse(s): Rebecca Prentiss, b. West Cambridge, (Arlington), Massachusetts, October 10, 1822.
- Parent: Alice Kent

William Henry Kent (March 21, 1823 – February 7, 1889) was a Massachusetts politician who served as a member of the Boston, Massachusetts, Board of Aldermen, the Charlestown, Massachusetts, Board of Aldermen, on the Charlestown, Massachusetts School Committee, and as the eleventh mayor of Charlestown, Massachusetts.

== Family life ==
Kent married Rebecca Prentiss of West Cambridge, (Arlington), Massachusetts, in that town on August 5, 1846, they had one child, a daughter, Alice Kent.

== Notes ==
Political offices
Preceded by Eugene L. Norton	11th Mayor of Charlestown, Massachusetts; 1870-1873	Succeeded by Jonathan Stone
