= Jonathan Stone =

Jonathan Stone or Jon Stone may refer to:

- Jon Stone, American TV writer and producer
- Jon Stone (poet), English poet
- Jonathan Stone, builder of the Captain Jonathan Stone House in Belpre, Ohio, 1799
- Jonathan Stone (Massachusetts politician) (1823–1897), mayor of Charlestown, Massachusetts
- Jonathan Stone (New Hampshire politician), member of the New Hampshire House of Representatives from 2022

== See also ==
- John Stone (disambiguation)
