= George Washington Warren =

American politician and lawyer (1813–1883)

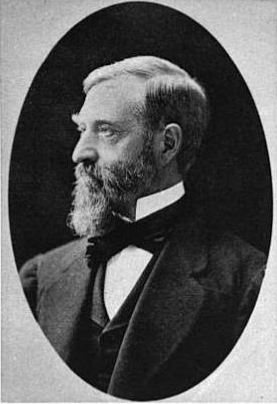

Judge of the Charlestown District Municipal Court
- In office 1861 – May 13, 1883

Member of the Massachusetts Senate
- In office 1853–1854

First Mayor of Charlestown
- In office 1847–1850
- Preceded by: Board of Selectmen
- Succeeded by: Richard Frothingham Jr.

Member of the Massachusetts House of Representatives
- In office 1838–1838

Personal details
- Born: October 1, 1813 Charlestown, Massachusetts, U.S.
- Died: May 13, 1883 (aged 69) Boston, Massachusetts, U.S.
- Party: Whig
- Spouses: Lucy Rogers Newell (m. 1835; died 1840) Georgianna Thompson (before 1883)
- Children: 6 including Lucius
- Education: Harvard College (1830); Harvard Law School

George Washington Warren (October 1, 1813 – May 13, 1883) was an American attorney and politician who served as the first mayor of Charlestown, Massachusetts from 1847 to 1850. He also served as the Member of the Massachusetts Senate from 1853 to 1854.

Born in Charlestown, Warren graduated from Harvard College and began teaching in Bedford. Whilst teaching, he began practicing law and left Bedford to go to Harvard Law School, where he graduated.

Warren first became a representative to the Massachusetts General Court in 1838. In 1847, he was elected as the first mayor of Charlestown, where he served to 1850. From 1837 to 1847, Warren served as the secretary of the Bunker Hill Monument Association, and as the President from 1847 to 1875. Warren finally became as a judge for the Municipal Court Charlestown District from 1861 until his death in 1883.

== Early life and education ==
George Washington Warren was born in Charlestown, Massachusetts on October 1, 1813, to Issac Warren and Abigail Fiske. Issac's ancestry is traced from John Warren, who settled in New England in 1630 alongside Sir Richard Saltonstall, while Fiske was the daughter of Jonathan Fiske of Weston, Massachusetts.

Warren graduated from Harvard College in 1830 as a member of the class of that year. Following his graduation, Warren taught at Friends Academy in New Bedford, Massachusetts. During his teaching career, he studied law in his spare time. Approximately two years after graduating from Harvard, he returned to Charlestown and began practicing law. He subsequently established a legal practice and developed a reputation as a capable attorney. Warren then later graduated from Harvard Law School.

== Career ==
Warren first served as a representative to the Massachusetts General Court in 1838. As a member of the Whig Party, Warren also served as the first mayor of Charlestown, Massachusetts from 1847 to 1850. From 1853 to 1854 he served as a Massachusetts state senator. Warren was closely involved with the Bunker Hill Monument Association, an organization to preserve the site of the Battle of Bunker Hill. Warren served as the secretary for the association from 1837 to 1847, and as the president from 1847 to 1875.

In 1877, Warren wrote and published The History of the Bunker Hill Monument Association During the First Century of the United States of America. The book was to commemorate the American Revolution.

== Personal life and death ==
In 1835, Warren married Lucy Rogers Newell, the daughter of Jonathan Newell and Eunice Bigelow. They had one son, Lucius Henry Warren, born in 1838. Lucy died on September 4, 1840. Warren then married Georgianna Thompson of Charlestown. In total, Warren had six children: two sons and three daughters. Warren served as a municipal court judge for Charlestown from 1861 until his death. He died in Boston, Massachusetts in 1883 at the age of 69.

== Notes ==
Political offices
Preceded by Board of Selectmen	First; Mayor of Charlestown, Massachusetts; 1847-1850	Succeeded by Richard Frothingham Jr.
Legal offices
Preceded by	Judge of the Municipal Court; Charlestown District; 1861–May 13, 1883	Succeeded by
