= Timothy T. Sawyer =

American politician

Timothy Thompson Sawyer
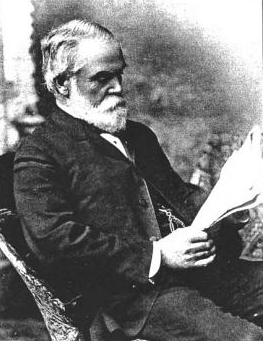

Fourth Mayor of Charlestown, Massachusetts
- In office 1855–1857
- Preceded by: James Adams
- Succeeded by: James Dana

Member of the Massachusetts State Senate First Middlesex District
- In office 1858–1858
- Preceded by: Joseph White
- Succeeded by: Eugene L. Norton

Member of the Massachusetts House of Representatives
- In office 1857–1857

Member of the School Committee of the Town of Charlestown, Massachusetts
- In office 1843–1845

Town Assessor of the Town of Charlestown, Massachusetts
- In office 1841–1841

Personal details
- Born: January 7, 1817 Charlestown, Massachusetts
- Died: September 4, 1905 (aged 88) Magnolia, Massachusetts
- Occupation: Ship's Chandeler, Ice Business, Banker
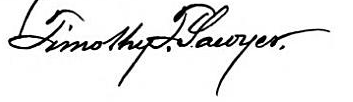
- Signature

Timothy Thompson Sawyer (January 7, 1817 – September 4, 1905) was a Massachusetts politician who served in both branches of the Massachusetts legislature, and as the fourth mayor of Charlestown, Massachusetts.

== Early life ==
Sawyer was born January 7, 1817, in Charlestown, Massachusetts, to William and Susana (Thompson) Sawyer. Sawyer was educated in the Charlestown public schools.

== Early career ==
After he left school, Sawyer went to work for an uncle who was engaged in the ship chancellery and hardware business. Sawyer later carried on the business himself for a number of years.

== Bibliography ==
- Old Charlestown: Historical, Biographical, Reminiscent (1902)
- Waters, Henry Fitz-Gilbert: The New England historical and Genealogical Register, Volume LX., pps. 1xx-1xxi. (1906).

== Notes ==
Political offices
Preceded by James Adams	Mayor of Charlestown, Massachusetts; 1855–1857	Succeeded by James Dana
Preceded by Joseph White	Member of the Massachusetts State Senate; First Middlesex District; 1858	Succeeded by Eugene L. Norton
