= Lucius Warren =

American judge and officer (1838–1924)

- Born: Lucius Henry Warren; October 6, 1838; Charlestown, Massachusetts, U.S.
- Died: May 15, 1924 (aged 85); Boston, Massachusetts, U.S.
- Education: Princeton College (M.A.)
- Spouse: Jane Maria Hollingsworth (m. 1868)
- Father: George Washington Warren
- Military career
- Allegiance: United States
- Branch: Union army United States army
- Service years: 1862–1879
- Rank: Brigadier general
- Unit: 32nd Massachusetts Infantry Regiment
- Battles: American Civil War; Second Battle of Bull Run; Battle of Antietam; Battle of Fredericksburg; Battle of Chancellorsville; Battle of Gettysburg; Siege of Petersburg

Lucius Henry Warren (October 6, 1838 − May 15, 1924) was an American lawyer and military officer serving as Brigadier General for the American Civil War.

The son of George Washington Warren, he went and fought in the American Civil War, fighting several battles before resigning in 1879. Afterwards, he went ahead and was admitted to the Massachusetts and Philadelphia bars. Warren later helped out with charitable events in Pennsylvania.

== Early life and education ==
Lucius Henry Warren was born in Charlestown, Massachusetts on October 6, 1838 to George Washington Warren and Lucy Rogers Newell. His father was a lawyer and politician who served as the first mayor of Charlestown. Warren went to Princeton College at the age of 20, and graduated in 1860. He then went to Harvard Law School, and graduated in 1862. Warren received a Master of Arts from Princeton in 1865.

== Service ==
In July 1862, Warren entered a Volunteer service, and enlisted as a private in the 32nd Massachusetts Infantry Regiment, fighting under the Union army during the American Civil War. During the war, he fought several battles including the Second Battle of Bull Run, the Battle of Fredericksburg, and the Battle of Gettysburg. He resigned on October 15, 1879.

== Law career ==
After his service, Warren practised law and was admitted to the Massachusetts and Philadelphia bars. He was also a former member of the Board of Inspectors of the Philadelphia County Prison and participated in charitable organizations in Pennsylvania.

== Personal life and death ==
Warren married Jane Maria Hollingsworth, the daughter of Amos Hollingsworth of Milton, Massachusetts, on October 1, 1868. He died on May 15, 1924 in his home in Boston, Massachusetts. He was 85.
