= James Adams (Massachusetts politician) =

American politician

Third Mayor of Charlestown, Massachusetts
- In office 1854–1854
- Preceded by: Richard Frothingham Jr.
- Succeeded by: Timothy T. Sawyer

Personal details
- Born: February 18, 1810; Charlestown, Massachusetts
- Died: November 13, 1880
- Spouse: Pamelia W. Skelton
- Children: James Adams
- Parent(s): Chester and Elizabeth (Watts) Adams

James Adams (February 18, 1810 – November 13, 1880) was a Massachusetts politician who served as the third mayor of Charlestown, Massachusetts.

== Early life ==
James Adams, was born to Chester and Elizabeth (Watts) Adams, in Charlestown, Massachusetts.

== Notes ==
Political offices
| Preceded by Richard Frothingham Jr. | Mayor of Charlestown, Massachusetts; 1854 | Succeeded by Timothy T. Sawyer |
