= James Dana (mayor) =

American politician

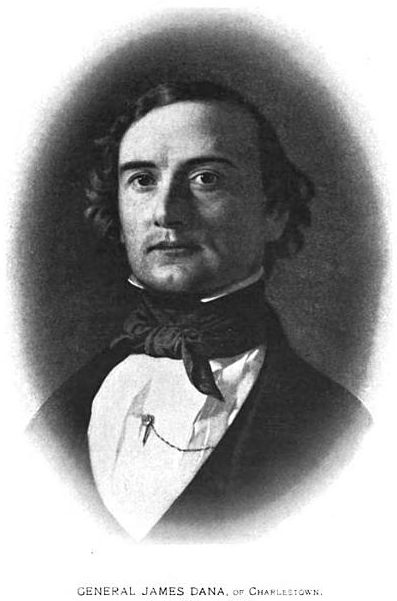

5th Mayor of Charlestown, Massachusetts
- In office 1858–1860
- Preceded by: Timothy T. Sawyer
- Succeeded by: Horace G. Hutchins

Clerk of Courts of Middlesex County, Massachusetts
- In office September 1, 1859 – December 1, 1859
- Preceded by: John Quincy Adams Griffin
- Succeeded by: Benjamin Franklin Ham

Personal details
- Born: November 8, 1811 Charlestown, Massachusetts
- Died: June 4, 1890 (aged 78) Dorchester, Massachusetts
- Education: Harvard
- Occupation: Lawyer

James Dana (November 8, 1811 – June 4, 1890) was a Massachusetts politician who was the fifth mayor of Charlestown, Massachusetts, USA.

== Early life ==
Dana was born in Charlestown to Samuel and Rebecca (née Barrett) Dana.

== Education ==
Dana was educated at Lawrence Academy, in Groton, Massachusetts, and graduated from Harvard College in the class of 1830.

== Sources ==
- Green, Samuel Abbott (1892). An Account of the Lawyers of Groton, Massachusetts. p. 55–56.

Political offices
Preceded by Timothy T. Sawyer	5th Mayor of Charlestown, Massachusetts; 1858–1860	Succeeded by Horace G. Hutchins
