= Charles Robinson Jr. =

American politician

Eighth Mayor of Charlestown, Massachusetts
- In office 1865–1866
- Preceded by: Phineas J. Stone
- Succeeded by: Liverus Hull

Member of the Massachusetts House of Representatives
- In office 1880–1880

Member of the Massachusetts House of Representatives
- In office 1874–1874

Personal details
- Born: November 6, 1829 Lexington, Massachusetts
- Died: July 30, 1891 West Newton, Massachusetts
- Party: Democrat, (until the 1850s); Republican
- Spouse: Rebecca T. Ames
- Children: Emma A. (Robinson) Travelli; Miner Robinson; Sumner Robinson

Charles Robinson Jr. (November 6, 1829 – July 30, 1891) was a Massachusetts politician who served as the eighth mayor of Charlestown, Massachusetts. Robinson was the brother of Massachusetts Governor George D. Robinson.

== Early life ==
Robinson was born in Lexington, Massachusetts to Charles and Mary (Davis) Robinson, on November 6, 1829.

== Notes ==
Political offices
Preceded by Phineas J. Stone	8thMayor of Charlestown, Massachusetts; 1865 to 1866	Succeeded by Liverus Hull
