= Phineas J. Stone =

American politician

Phineas Jones Stone
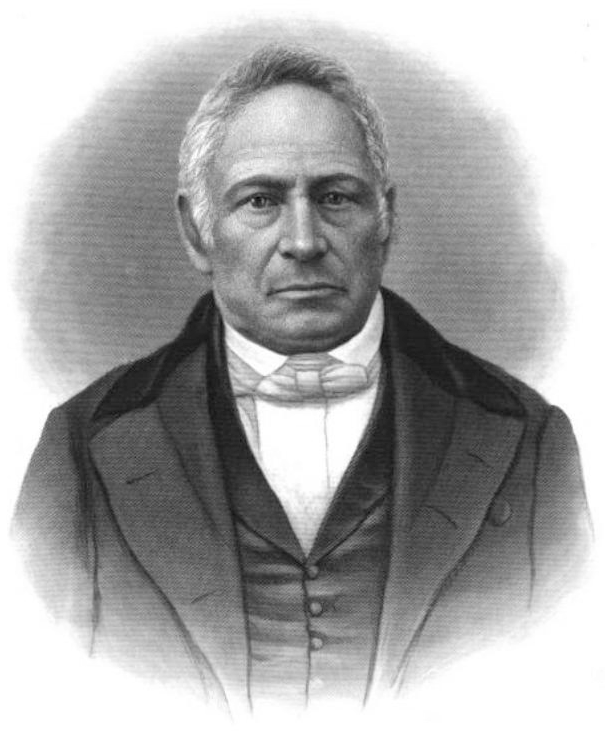

Seventh Mayor of Charlestown, Massachusetts
- In office 1862–1864
- Preceded by: Horace G. Hutchins
- Succeeded by: Charles Robinson Jr.

Member of the Massachusetts House of Representatives for Middlesex County
- In office 1840, 1856, 1862–1863

Member of the Charlestown, Massachusetts Board of Selectmen
- In office 1839–1840

President of the Charlestown, Massachusetts Common Council
- In office 1854
- Preceded by: Henry P. Fairbanks
- Succeeded by: Horace G. Hutchins

Member of the Charlestown, Massachusetts Common Council Ward Two
- In office 1850–1854

Personal details
- Born: May 23, 1810 Weare, New Hampshire
- Died: August 12, 1891 (aged 81) Charlestown, Massachusetts
- Resting place: Mount Auburn Cemetery
- Party: Republican
- Spouse: Ann Maria (Lindsey)
- Children: Phineas Jones Stone Jr.; Joseph Stone

Phineas (Note: Also spelled "Phinehas" in some sources, and by Stone himself) Jones Stone (May 23, 1810 – August 12, 1891) was a Massachusetts politician who served as a member of the Massachusetts House of Representatives as a member of the Board of Selectmen for the Town of Charlestown, Massachusetts, as a member of and president of the Common Council and as the seventh mayor of the City of Charlestown, Massachusetts.

== Biography ==
Phineas J. Stone was born in Weare, New Hampshire on May 23, 1810.

A Republican, he served in political offices from 1850 to 1864. For the last 25 years of his life, he was president of the Charlestown Five Cents Savings Bank.

He died at his home in Charlestown on August 12, 1891, and was buried at Mount Auburn Cemetery.

== Notes ==
Political offices
Preceded by Horace G. Hutchins	Mayor of Charlestown, Massachusetts; 1862 to 1864	Succeeded by Charles Robinson Jr.
