= Eugene L. Norton =

American politician (1825–1880)

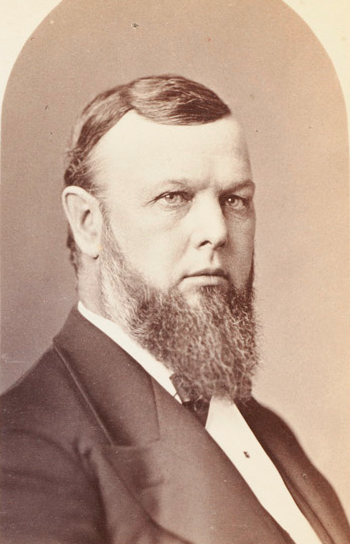

10th Mayor of Charlestown, Massachusetts
- In office 1869–1869
- Preceded by: Liverus Hull
- Succeeded by: William H. Kent

Member of the Massachusetts State Senate for the First Middlesex District
- In office 1859–1861
- Preceded by: Timothy T. Sawyer
- Succeeded by: Erastus O. Haven

Member of the Massachusetts State Senate for the Second Suffolk District
- In office 1879 – January 21, 1880
- Succeeded by: William T. Van Nostrand

Member of the Massachusetts House of Representatives
- In office 1878–1878

Member of the Charlestown, Massachusetts Board of Library Trustees
- In office June 9, 1860 – 1863
- Preceded by: New Position
- Succeeded by: Edwin F. Adams

President of the Charlestown, Massachusetts Common Council
- In office 1863–1864
- Preceded by: John N. Devereux
- Succeeded by: Charles F. Smith

Member of the Charlestown, Massachusetts Common Council Ward 2
- In office 1863–1864

Personal details
- Born: March 26, 1825 Livermore, Maine
- Died: January 21, 1880 (aged 54)
- Party: Republican

Eugene L. Norton (March 26, 1825 – January 21, 1880) was a Massachusetts politician who served in both branches of the Massachusetts legislature, and as the tenth mayor of Charlestown, Massachusetts.

== See also ==
- 1878 Massachusetts legislature

== Notes ==
Political offices
Preceded by Liverus Hull	10th Mayor of Charlestown, Massachusetts; 1869 to 1869	Succeeded by William H. Kent
