= Horace G. Hutchins =

American politician

Horace Green Hutchins

Seventh Mayor of Charlestown, Massachusetts
- In office 1861–1861
- Preceded by: James Dana
- Succeeded by: Phineas J. Stone

President of the Charlestown, Massachusetts Common Council
- In office 1855–1857
- Preceded by: Phineas J. Stone
- Succeeded by: William W. Peirce

Member of the Charlestown, Massachusetts Common Council Ward One
- In office 1854–1857

Personal details
- Born: July 20, 1811 Bath, New Hampshire
- Died: April 7, 1877 Roxbury, Massachusetts
- Spouse: Julia Hannah Hurd
- Education: Phillips Exeter Academy, Dartmouth College A.M.; Harvard Law School
- Occupation: Attorney

Horace Green Hutchins (July 20, 1811 – April 7, 1877) was a Massachusetts politician who served as the seventh mayor of Charlestown, Massachusetts.

== Early life and education ==
Hutchins was born in Bath, New Hampshire on July 20, 1811 to Hon. Samuel and Rosanna (Childs) Hutchins. Hutchins graduated from Phillips Exeter Academy in 1830. He then attended Dartmouth College, where he graduated with an A.M. degree in 1835. Hutchins studied law with Rufus Choate and at Harvard. In October 1839 Hutchins was admitted to the Massachusetts bar. On October 22, 1844, Hutchins married Julia Hanna Hurd, the daughter of John Hurd of Boston.

== Political offices ==
Hutchens was elected to represent Chalestown's Ward 1 in the city's Common Council for the term beginning 1854, he served as a member of the Common Council from 1854 to 1857. Hutchens served as President of the Charlestown Common Council from 1855 to 1857, Hutchins was the mayor of Charlestown in 1861.

== Notes ==
Political offices
| Preceded by James Dana | Mayor of Charlestown, Massachusetts; 1861 to 1861 | Succeeded by Phineas J. Stone |
