= Richard Frothingham Jr. =

American politician (1812–1880)

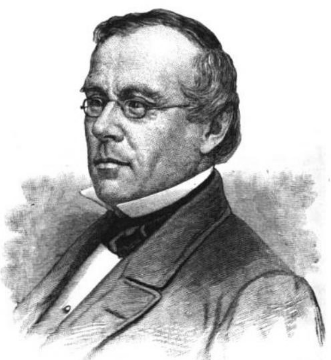

Second Mayor of Charlestown, Massachusetts
- In office 1851–1853
- Preceded by: George Washington Warren
- Succeeded by: James Adams

Personal details
- Born: January 31, 1812 Charlestown, Massachusetts
- Died: January 29, 1880 Charlestown, Massachusetts
- Party: Democratic
- Spouse: Vrylena Blanchard
- Occupation: Journalist, Newspaper editor

Richard Frothingham Jr. (January 31, 1812 – January 29, 1880) was an American historian, journalist, and politician from Massachusetts. Frothingham was a proprietor and managing editor of The Boston Post. He also served in the Massachusetts House of Representatives, and as the second mayor of Charlestown, Massachusetts, in what is now Boston.

== Early life ==
Frothingham was born in Charlestown, Massachusetts, to Richard and Mary (Thompson) Frothingham. He attended school in Charlestown.

== Journalistic career ==
Frothingham was a proprietor, and from 1852 to 1865, a managing editor of, The Boston Post.

== Politics ==
He was a member of the Massachusetts state legislature in 1839, 1840, 1842, 1849, and 1850, and mayor of Charlestown from 1851 to 1853. Frothingham was a delegate to the 1852 Democratic National Convention. During the 1852 election, Frothingham was an energetic supporter of Franklin Pierce for President. He was also a delegate to the 1876 Democratic National Convention.

== Writings ==
He devoted much of his time to historical study, and published, in addition to many pamphlets, magazine articles and addresses:

- History of Charlestown (1848)
- History of the Siege of Boston, and the battles of Lexington, Concord and Bunker Hill (1849)
- The Command in the Battle of Bunker Hill (1850)
- Life and Times of Joseph Warren (1865)
- Tribute to Thomas Starr King (1865)
- The Rise of the Republic of the United States, his most important work by some estimates (1871)
- The Centennial: Battle of Bunker Hill (1875)

For several years, he was treasurer of the Massachusetts Historical Society. In 1858, Frothingham was elected a member of the American Antiquarian Society.

Political offices
Preceded by George Washington Warren	Mayor of Charlestown, Massachusetts; 1851–1853	Succeeded by James Adams
