= John Stone =

John Stone may refer to:

== Politicians ==
- John Stone (Parliamentarian) (before 1632 – after 1659), English politician
- John Stone (MP for Wallingford) (before 1679 – after 1685), English politician
- John G. Stone (1876–1934), Newfoundland politician
- John Hoskins Stone (1750–1804), American politician from Maryland
- John Marshall Stone (1830–1900), American politician and governor of Mississippi, 1876–1882 and 1890–1896
- Sir John Benjamin Stone (1838–1914), British Member of Parliament
- John W. Stone (1838–1922), American politician and jurist from Michigan
- John Young Stone (1843–1928), American politician from Iowa
- John Stone (Australian politician) (1929–2025), Australian Senator and Treasury Secretary
- John Stone (sheriff) (1949–2022), American politician and police officer from Colorado

== Religious people ==
- John Stone (chronicler) (died 1481), English monk and chronicler
- John Stone (martyr) (died c. 1539), English martyr
- John Stone (1765) (1765–1834), American church deacon
- John Timothy Stone (1868–1954), American Presbyterian clergyman

== Sportspeople ==
- Stein Stone (James Nollner Stone Sr., 1882–1926), American football coach at Clemson University in 1908
- John Stone (baseball) (1905–1955), American baseball outfielder
- John Stone (curler) (born 1934), Welsh curler and coach
- John Stone (footballer) (born 1953), English footballer
- John Stone (American football) (born 1979), American football player
- John Stone (athlete) (1909–1955), English hurdler

== Others ==
- John Hurford Stone (1763–1818), British radical political reformer and publisher
- John Augustus Stone (1801–1834), American dramatist and playwright
- John Stone Stone (1869–1943), American mathematician, physicist and inventor
- John Stone (producer) (1888–1961), American film producer and screenwriter
- J. F. S. Stone (John Frederick Smerdon Stone, 1899–1957), British archaeologist
- John Stone (actor) (1924–2007), Welsh actor
- John A. Stone (died 1864), American collector and publisher of folk songs

== Fiction ==
- John Stone (comics), character in DC Comics Planetary series

== See also ==
- Sir John Stonor (judge) (1281–1354), English judge
- John Stonor (bishop) (1678–1756), English Roman Catholic bishop
- John Stones (born 1994), English footballer
- Jonathan Stone (disambiguation)
