= Liverus Hull =

American politician

9th Mayor of Charlestown, Massachusetts
- In office 1867–1868
- Preceded by: Charles Robinson Jr.
- Succeeded by: Eugene L. Norton

Member of the Boston, Massachusetts Board of Aldermen
- In office 1876–1876

Member of the Charlestown, Massachusetts Board of Aldermen Ward 2
- In office 1865–1866

Personal details
- Born: September 14, 1822; Westfield, Massachusetts
- Died: May 2, 1894 (aged 71); Westfield, Massachusetts
- Parent: Hiram Hull

Liverus Hull (September 14, 1822 – May 2, 1894) was a Massachusetts businessman and politician who served as a member of the Boards of Aldermen of Charlestown and Boston, and as the ninth mayor of Charlestown, Massachusetts.

== Notes ==
Political offices
Preceded by Charles Robinson Jr.	9th Mayor of Charlestown, Massachusetts; 1867–1868	Succeeded by Eugene L. Norton
