= Winthrop Square (Charlestown, Boston) =

Park in Boston, Massachusetts

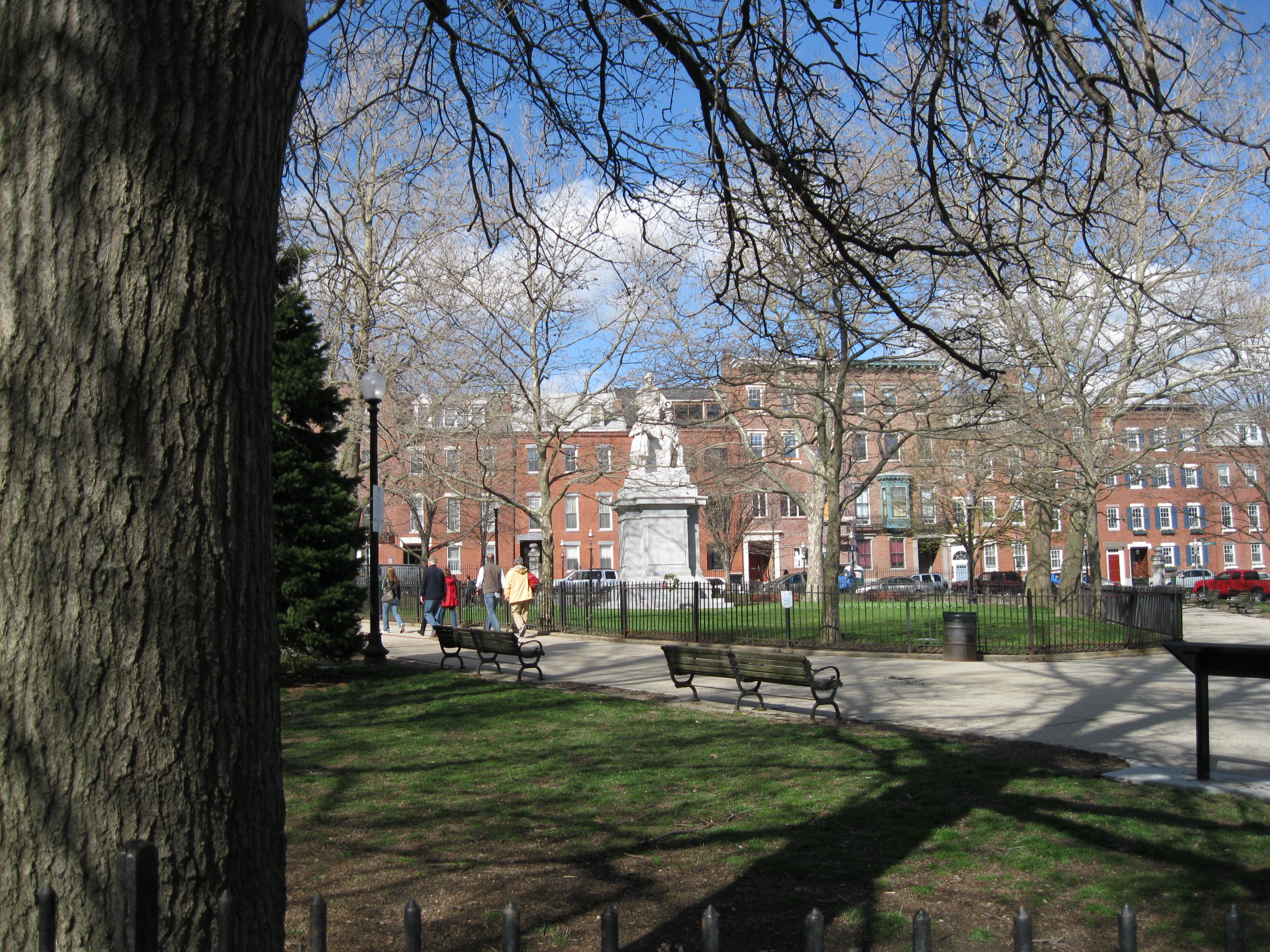
- The park in 2010
- Interactive map of Winthrop Square
- Location: Charlestown, Boston, Massachusetts, U.S.
- Coordinates: 42.3743°N 71.0602°W

Winthrop Square, also known as Training Field, is a historic park and former militia training field in Boston's Charlestown neighborhood, in the U.S. state of Massachusetts. The Charlestown Civil War Memorial is installed in the park.
