= List of mayors of Charlestown, Massachusetts =

The Mayor of Charlestown was the head of the municipal government in Charlestown, Massachusetts. There was no mayor of Charlestown until 1847 because up to that point Charlestown was still incorporated as a town. When Charlestown was annexed by the City of Boston, the position was abolished.

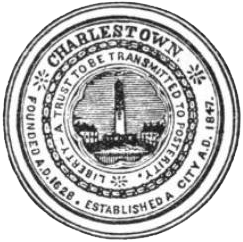
Former City Seal

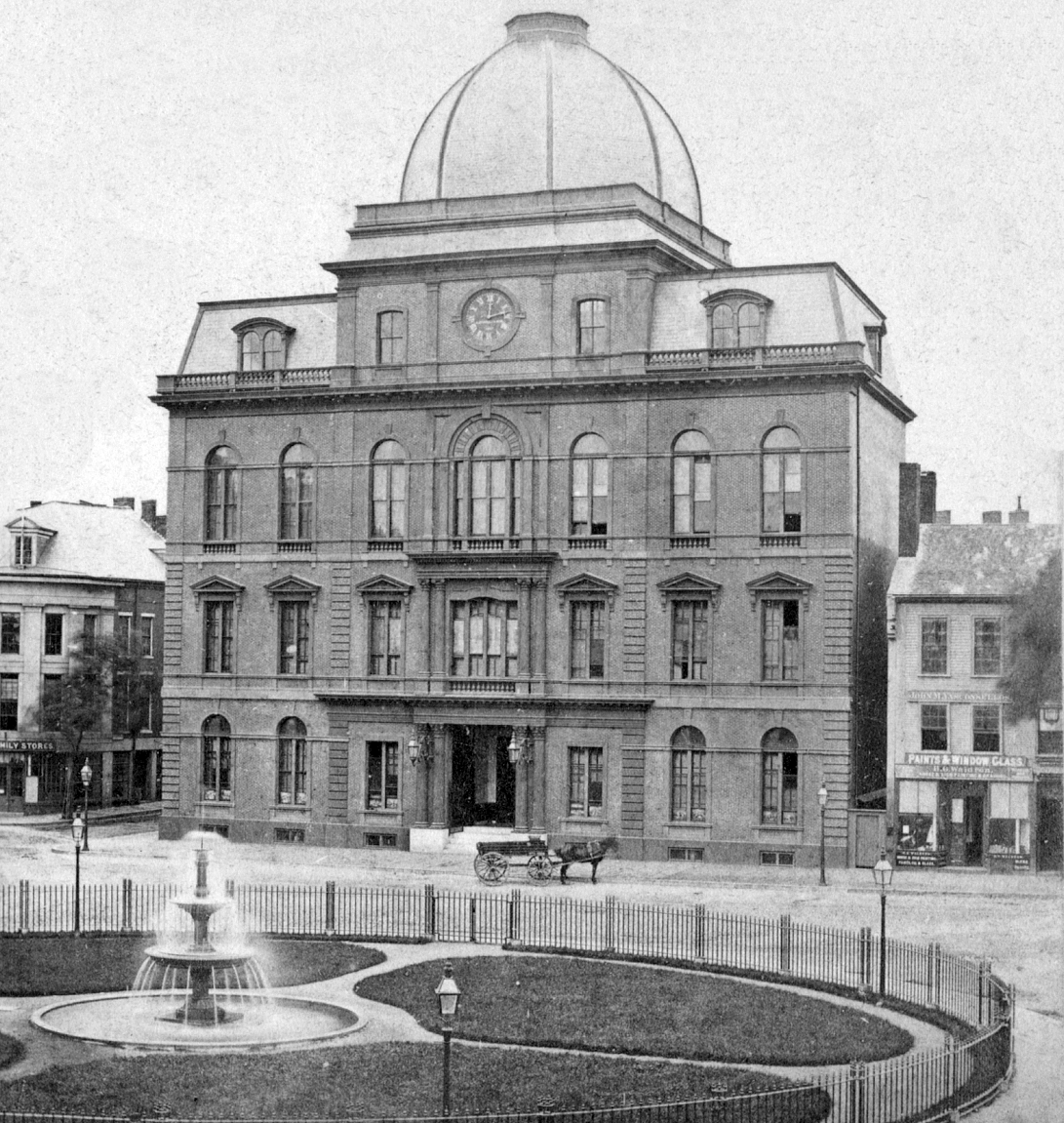
Charlestown's former City Hall

== List of mayors ==
No.	Image	Mayor	Term	Party
1		George Washington Warren	1847–1850	Whig
2		Richard Frothingham Jr.	1851–1853	Democrat
3		James Adams	1854-1854	None
4		Timothy T. Sawyer	1855–1857	Citizens
5		James Dana	1858–1860	None
6		Horace G. Hutchins	1861-1861	None
7		Phineas J. Stone	1862–1864	None
8		Charles Robinson Jr.	1865–1866	Republican
9		Liverus Hull	1867–1868	None
10		Eugene L. Norton	1869-1869	Republican
11		William H. Kent	1870–1873	None
12		Jonathan Stone	1873-1873	None

== See also ==
- Guide to the City of Charlestown records.
- List of mayors of Boston, Massachusetts (1874–Present), Most current mayors.
