= Thomas Graves (engineer) =

English engineer

Thomas Graves (c. 1585 – November 1662) was an English engineer and city planner responsible for the laying out of the city of Charlestown in Massachusetts Bay Colony, now a neighborhood of Boston, Massachusetts.

== Life ==
Coat of Arms of Thomas Graves

Graves was born in Gravesend, Kent, around 1583 or 1585. He signed a contract with the Massachusetts Bay Company in March 1629 and arrived in New England in July 1629. He brought his wife, Sarah Whiting, five children, and two servants. He reportedly arrived with Gov. John Endecott's company on the George Bonaventure, which arrived in Salem, Massachusetts, in 1629. He was one of the founders of Hadley, Massachusetts, in 1645, by which time he also owned property in Hartford, Connecticut. They later moved to Hatfield, Massachusetts.

He also laid out the city of Charlestown.
