= Sarah Emily York =

American missionary to Greece

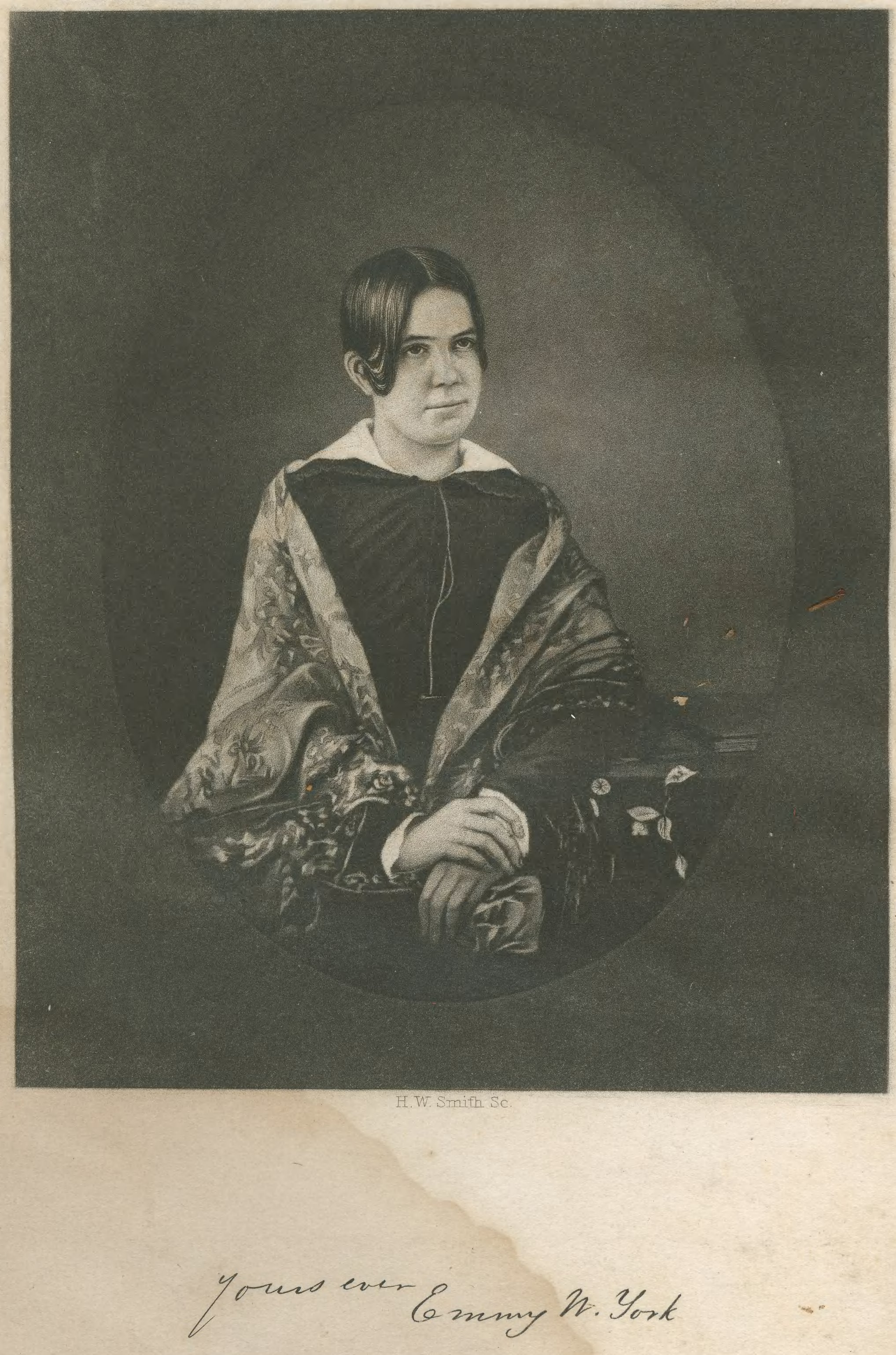
Sarah Emily York

Sarah Emily York (1819 – 1851) was an American missionary to Greece.

== Biography ==
Sarah Emily York was born in 1819 in Charlestown, Massachusetts. After completing her schooling at the female seminary in Charlestown, Massachusetts, she became a teacher in Boston. She taught both in a private school and in a Baptist Sunday school.

With the support of Baptist Board of Foreign Missions, she arrived to Greece as a missionary in 1844.

She started the works at the missionary fields of the Greek islands of Corfu and Zakynthos as well as in the city of Piraeus. She worked in a school at Corfu. In 1848, she married John York, a native of Corfu.

She died in Charlestown in 1851 following “fever”.
