= Charlestown Civil War Memorial =

Sculpture in Boston, Massachusetts, U.S.

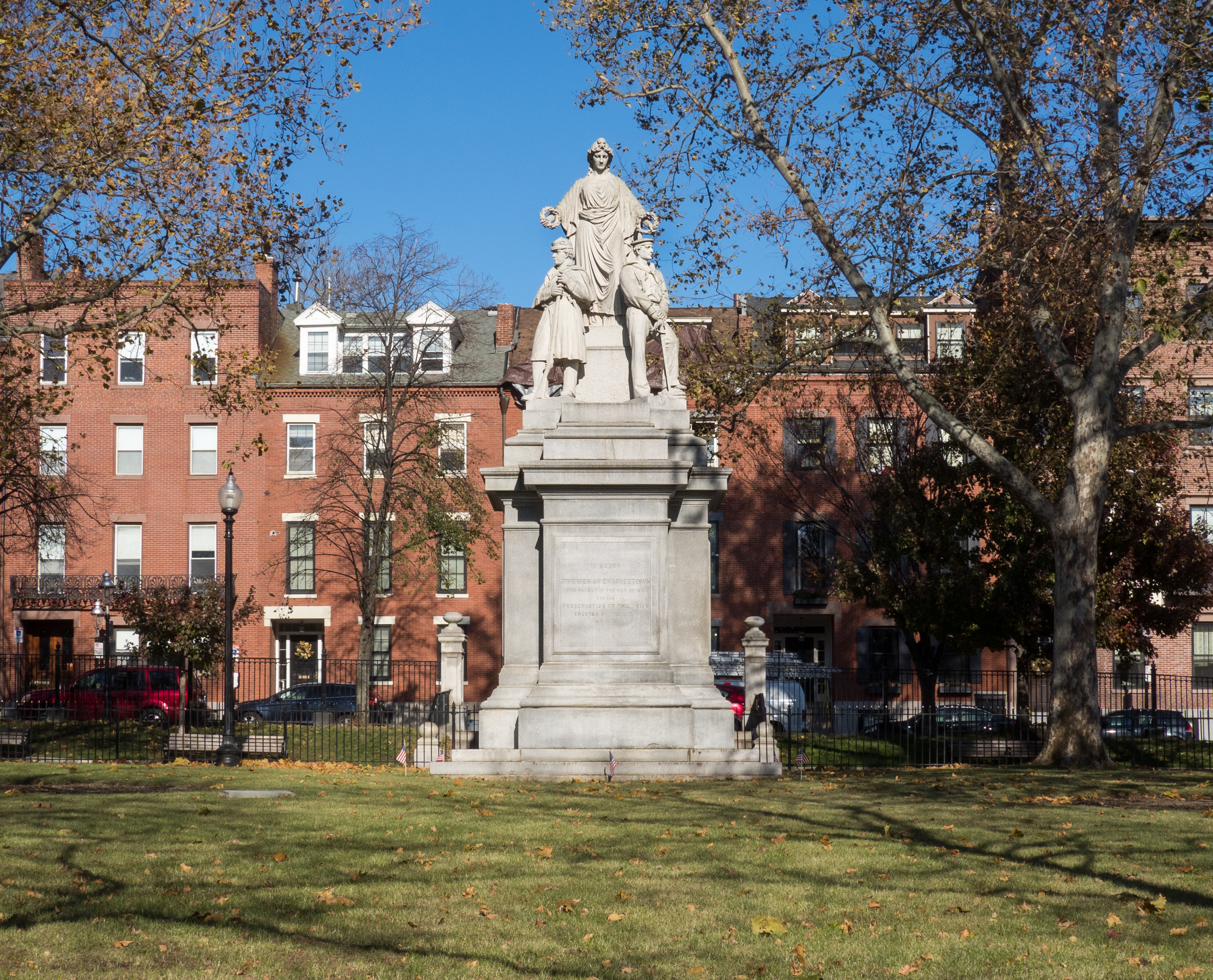
- The monument in 2019
- Interactive map of Charlestown Civil War Memorial
- Location: Boston, Massachusetts
- Coordinates: 42.374433°N 71.059978°W
- Designer: Martin Milmore
- Type: Monument
- Material: Granite
- Length: 8 ft
- Width: 9 ft
- Height: 12 ft
- Beginning date: 1871
- Dedicated date: 1872

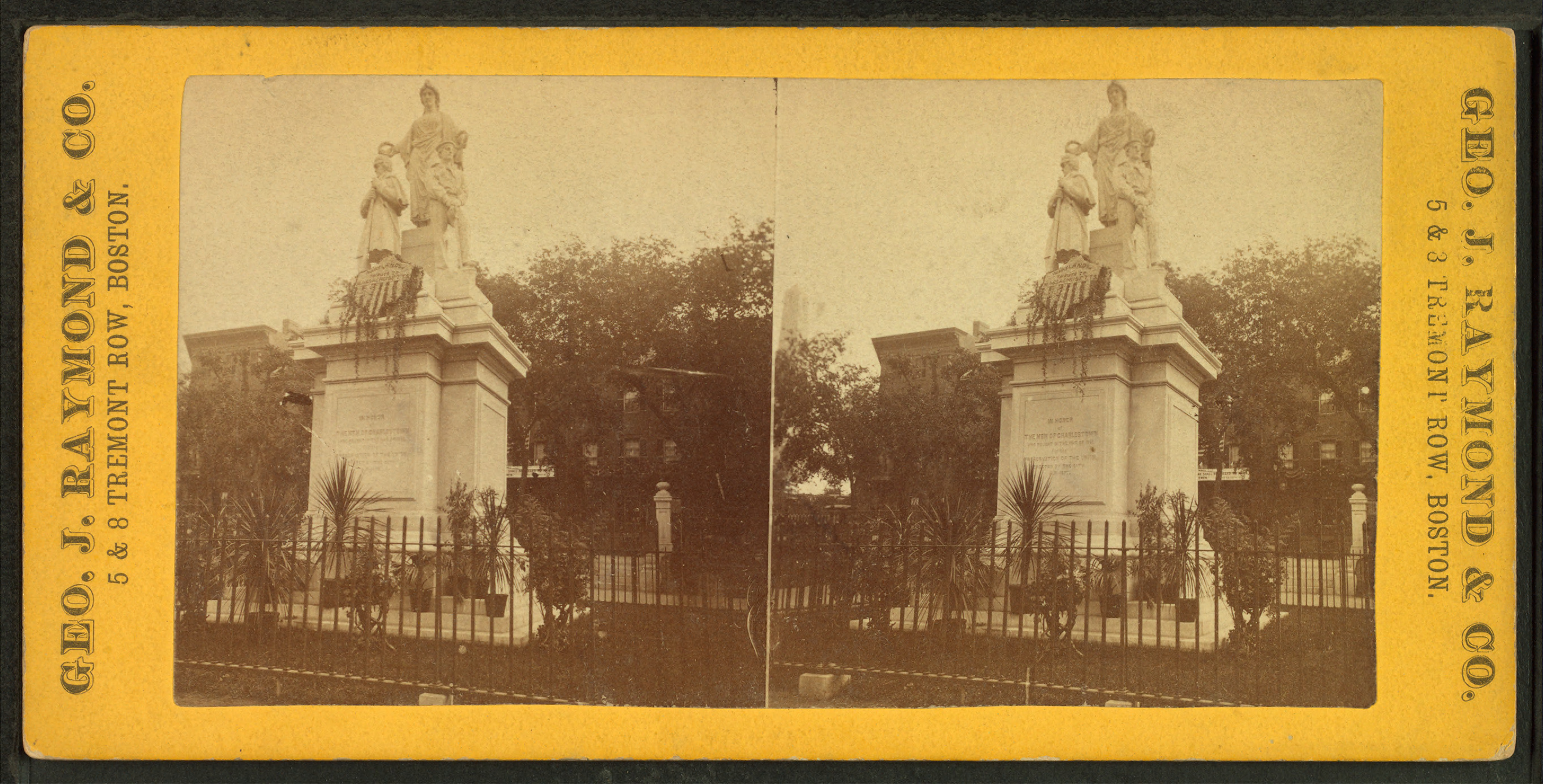
Stereo card of the monument

The Charlestown Civil War Memorial, also known as the Soldiers' and Sailors' Monument, is an outdoor granite monument and sculpture by Martin Milmore, commemorating the men of Charlestown, Boston, who fought to preserve the Union during the American Civil War. The memorial is installed in the Training Field in Charlestown, in the U.S. state of Massachusetts.

== Description and history ==
The memorial, executed in granite, was designed in 1871 and dedicated in 1872. The sculpture measures approximately 12 x 9 x 8 ft, and depicts three figures: an allegorical female representing Liberty, carrying laurel wreaths in both hands, standing over two men, one a sailor and the other a soldier. The sculptural group is mounted on a pedestal and a base measuring 18 x 13 x 13 ft.

The work was surveyed as part of the Smithsonian Institution's "Save Outdoor Sculpture!" program in 1993.
