= Eleanor Baldwin Cass =

American fencer

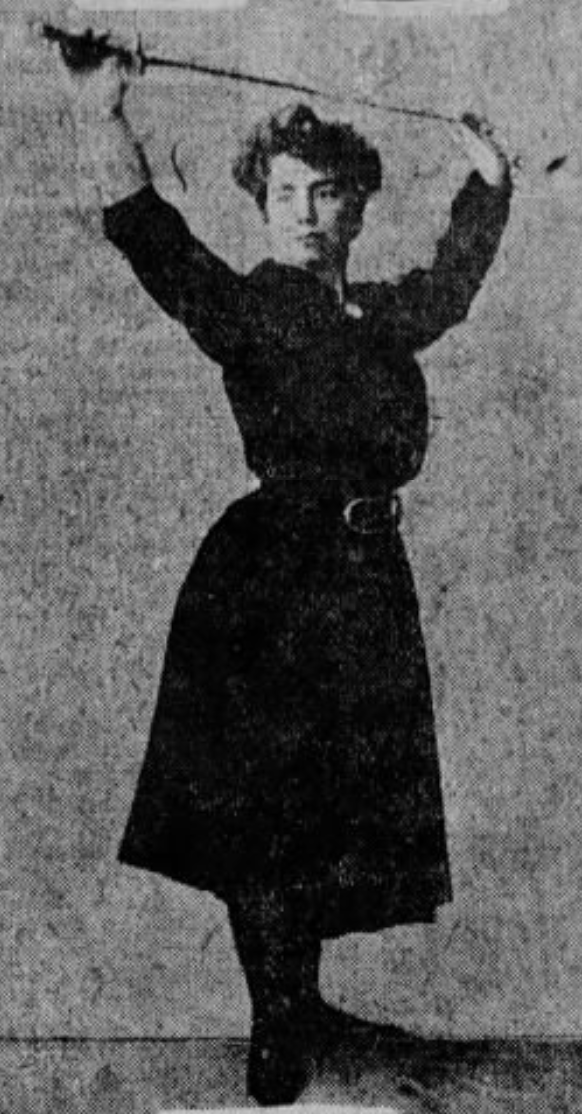
- Eleanor Baldwin Cass, from a 1904 publication
- Born: Eleanor G. Baldwin; February 5, 1874; Charlestown, Massachusetts, U.S.
- Died: August 24, 1966 (aged 92)
- Other name: Ella G. Cass
- Occupations: Fencer, writer, educator

Eleanor G. Baldwin Cass (February 5, 1874 – August 26, 1966) was an American fencer, who promoted fencing and wrote about the sport.

== Early life and education ==
Baldwin was born in Charlestown, Massachusetts, the daughter of Charles F. Baldwin and Mary Gilbert Baldwin. She graduated from the Sargent School of Physical Education and Emerson College in Boston.

== Career ==
Cass was a competitive fencer, "reputed to have the most beautiful form of any woman in the world." She gave fencing demonstrations on stage. She taught fencing to women at Mount Holyoke College, Wheaton College, Smith College, and the Jackson College for Women. She also taught privately in Newport, to young men and women in wealthy families, including the Vanderbilts and Astors. James J. Van Alen was one of her fencing students. Her 1930 book on fencing included historical and practical information, with diagrams and photographs.

Cass was a skilled horsewoman, and played tennis and golf well. She also directed a church play given as a fundraiser during World War I. "No mother should neglect a talent that has been given to her," she told an interviewer in 1930. "She need not use it remuneratively, but she should make it benefit the family."

Cass filed for bankruptcy in 1920 and 1924, and was arrested for passing a bad check in Rhode Island in 1924.

== Publications ==
- The Book of Fencing (1930)

== Personal life ==
Baldwin married banker John W. Cass in 1900. They had five sons, John, Robert, Francis, Leo, and Edward, who all became fencers. Her son Francis started the Medford Fencing Club in 1924; he died in World War II. She died in 1966, at the age of 92, in Cambridge, Massachusetts.
