= Jonathan Stone (Massachusetts politician) =

American politician

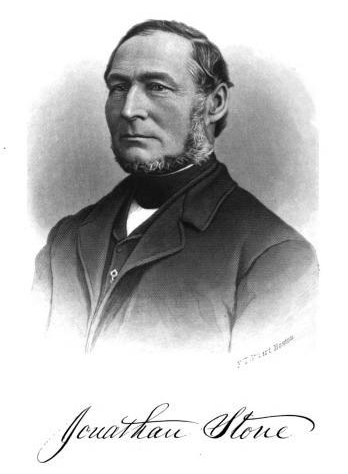

12th Mayor of Charlestown, Massachusetts
- In office 1873 – January 1, 1874
- Preceded by: William H. Kent
- Succeeded by: Office abolished

Member of the Common Council of Charlestown, Massachusetts Ward 2
- In office 1872 – January 1873

Member of the Board of Selectmen of Revere, Massachusetts
- In office 1888–1888

Personal details
- Born: April 29, 1823; Weare, New Hampshire
- Died: November 26, 1897; Revere, Massachusetts
- Spouse(s): Sarah Rebecca Andrews; Mary L. Andrews
- Occupation: Grocer

Jonathan Stone (April 29, 1823 – November 26, 1897) was a Massachusetts politician who served on the Common Council, and as the twelfth and last mayor, of Charlestown, Massachusetts; and on the Revere, Massachusetts, Board of Selectmen.

== Notes ==
Political offices
Preceded by William H. Kent	12th Mayor of Charlestown, Massachusetts; 1873 – January 1, 1874	Succeeded by Office abolished
