= Warren Tavern =

Tavern founded in 1780 in Charlestown, Massachusetts

Coordinates: 42°22′27.3″N 71°3′47.1″W

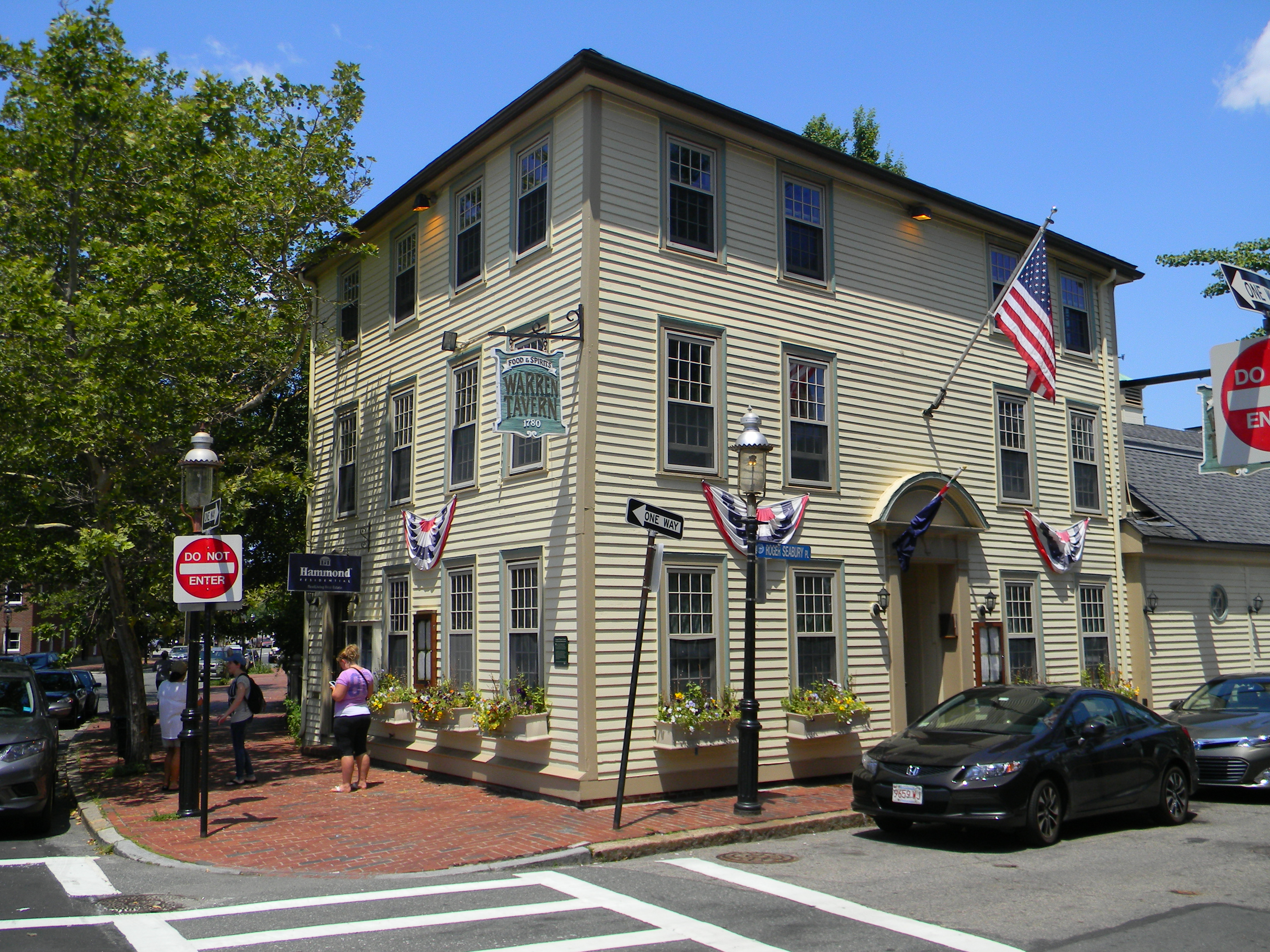
- Founded: 1780
- Headquarters: 2 Pleasant Street, Charlestown, Massachusetts, US
- Website: warrentavern.com

The Warren Tavern is reportedly one of the oldest taverns in the state of Massachusetts and one of the most historic watering holes in America. The Warren Tavern was founded in 1780 in Charlestown, Massachusetts and still stands in that block of land today. In the early years of the Warren Tavern it was frequented by many American Revolutionary War heroes such as Paul Revere, Benjamin Franklin, and George Washington.

== History ==
The Tavern was named after Dr. Joseph Warren, one of the revolutionary leaders killed at the Battle of Bunker Hill. The Warren Tavern, whose main business has always been a tavern, has only been closed for short periods of time since 1780.

== In popular culture ==
The Boston private eye Spenser has dinner at the Warren Tavern in the 1982 Robert B. Parker novel Ceremony.
