= John Stone (1765) =

Deacon John Stone (1765–1834) was an early citizen of Middlebury, Connecticut. He owned a saw mill, and was one of the early members of the Middlebury Congregational Church.

John Stone was born on March 17, 1765, in Milford, Connecticut, to Samuel Mansfield Stone and Sarah Stone.

Before living in Middlebury, he had lived in Southbury, Connecticut. In Middlebury, he was an owner of a saw mill on Eight Mile Brook near his house. Today, all that remains of this mill are the granite foundations. George Lum also operated the mill.

He joined the Middlebury Congregational Church on March 22, 1796, approximately a month after its founding. He was elected and served as Deacon from 1799 until his death in 1834.

== Family life ==
He married Esther Stow on September 11, 1785. She was the daughter of Captain Steven Stowe and Freelove Baldwin. Captain Stephen Stowe left his family to help soldiers who had been taken prisoner by the British during the Revolutionary War. He contracted smallpox while taking care of his men, and is memorialized on the Soldiers' Monument in Milford, CT.

John and Esther's children included Esther Stone (1786-1858), Stephen Stone (1787-1881), Marcus Stone (b. 1789), Sarah Stone (1791-1855), Almira Stone (b. 1792), Harvey Stone (1794-1839), Clarissa Stone (b. 1797), Siloama or Salome Stone (1801-1862), and John E. Stone (1807-1810). Their daughter Esther Stone married the Reverend Bennet Tyler, the minister in Woodbury from 1808 to 1822, and the fifth president of Dartmouth College from 1822 to 1828.

Deacon Stone died on August 7, 1834.
