= Charlestown, Boston =

Neighborhood of Boston, Massachusetts

Charlestown
- Neighborhood of Boston
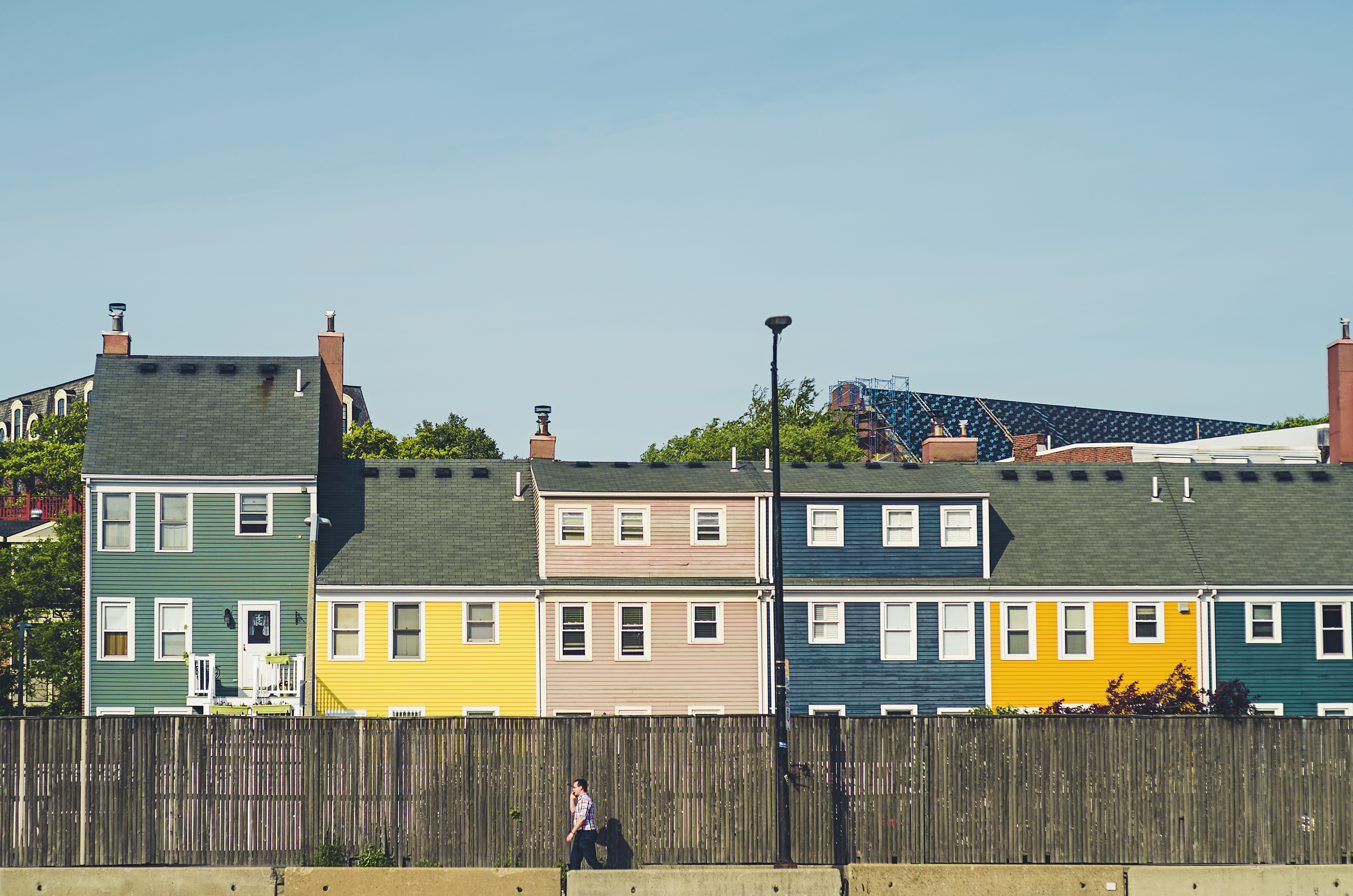
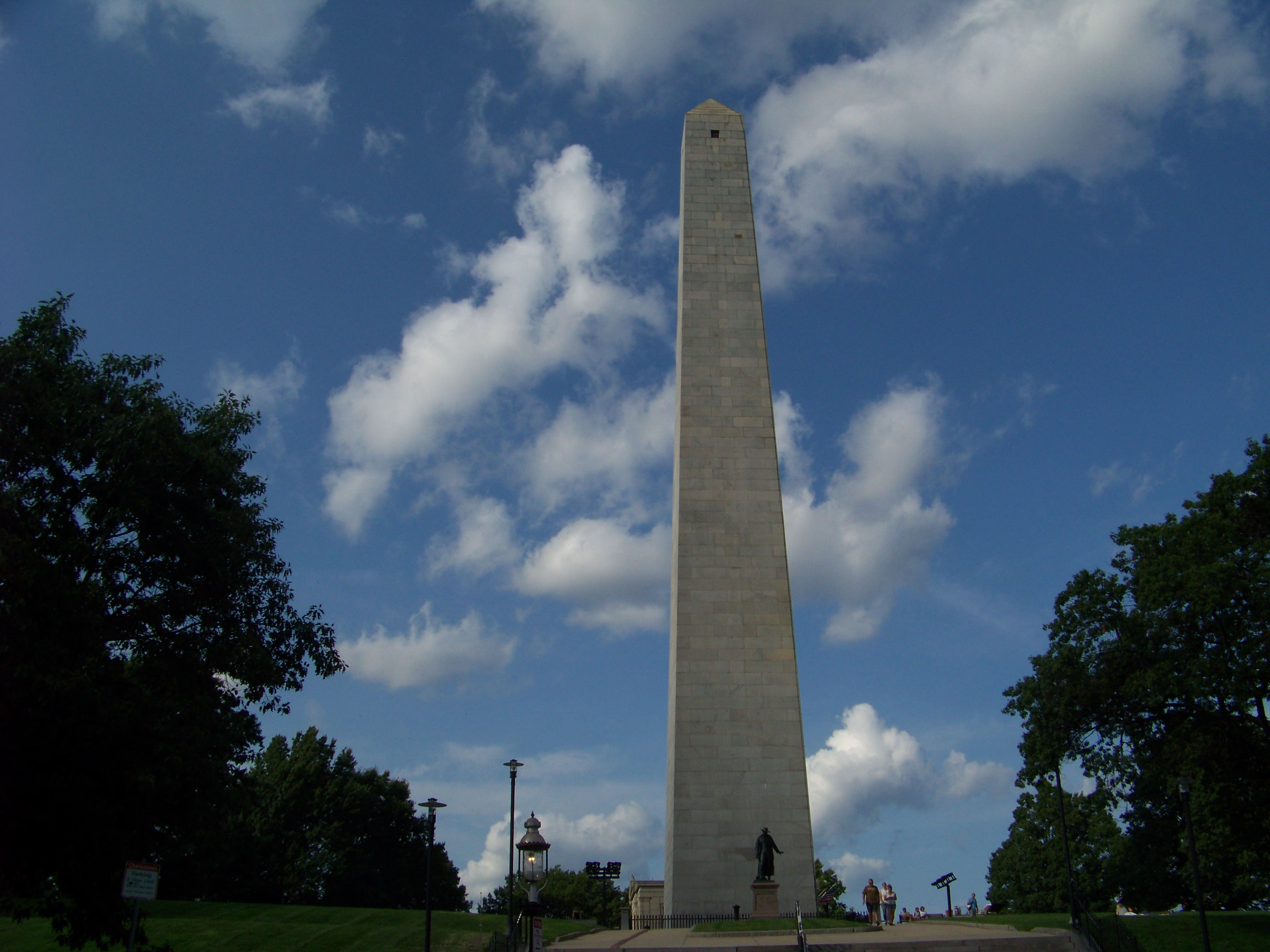
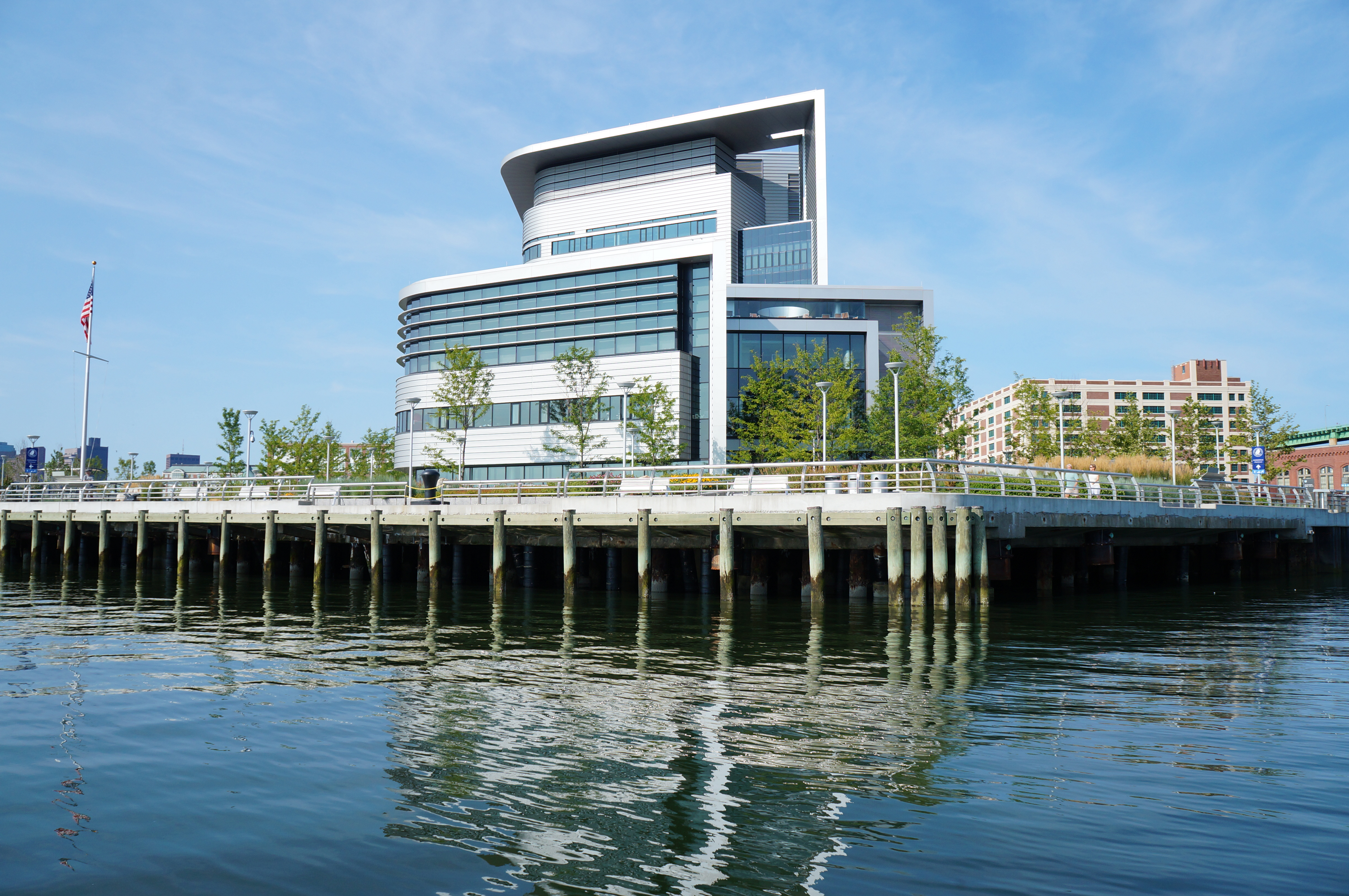
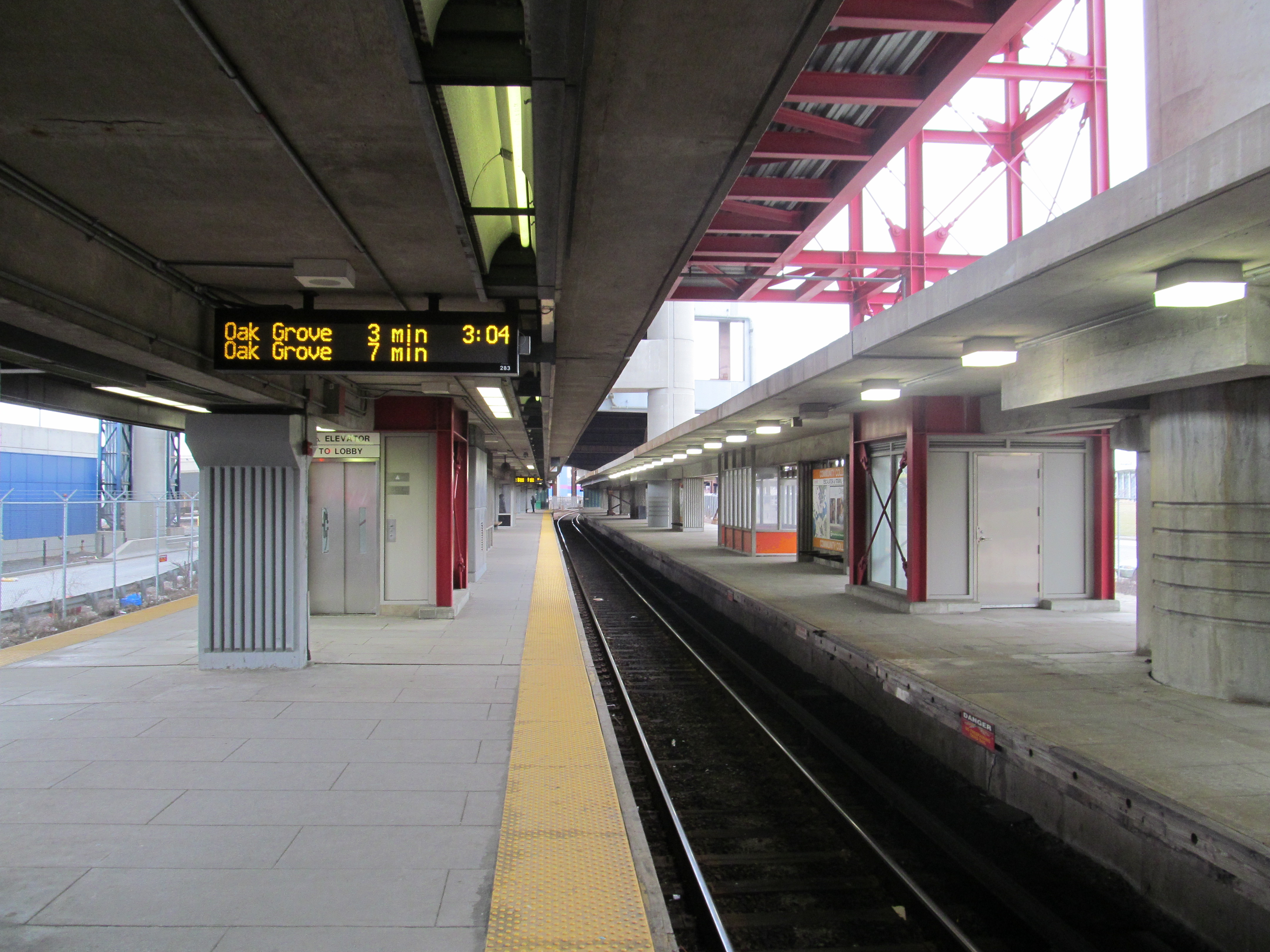
- Left-right from top: Houses in Charlestown, Bunker Hill Monument, Spaulding Rehabilitation Hospital, Community College MBTA station

- Seal
- Motto: Liberty A Trust To Be Transmitted To Posterity
- Interactive map of Charlestown
- Coordinates: 42°22′31″N 71°03′52″W
- Country: United States
- State: Massachusetts
- City: Boston
- Settled: 1628
- Incorporated (Town): 1628
- Incorporated (City): 1847
- Annexed by Boston: 1874
- Named for: King Charles I
- Time zone: UTC-5 (Eastern)
  - Summer (DST): UTC-4 (Eastern)
- Zip Code: 02129
- Area code: 617/857

Charlestown is a neighborhood in Boston, Massachusetts, United States, and the oldest settlement in modern-day Boston. Also called Mishawum by the Massachusett, it is located on a peninsula north of the Charles River, across from downtown Boston, and also adjoins the Mystic River and Boston Harbor waterways. Charlestown was laid out in 1629 by engineer Thomas Graves, one of its earliest settlers, during the reign of Charles I of England. It was originally a separate town and the first capital of the Massachusetts Bay Colony.

Charlestown became a city in 1848 and was annexed by Boston on January 5, 1874. With that, it also switched from Middlesex County, to which it had belonged since 1643, to Suffolk County. It has had a substantial Irish-American population since the migration of Irish people during the Great Irish Famine of the 1840s. Since the late 1980s, the neighborhood has changed dramatically because of its proximity to downtown and its colonial architecture. A mix of yuppie and upper-middle-class gentrification has influenced much of the area, as it has in many of Boston's neighborhoods.

In the 21st century, Charlestown's diversity has expanded dramatically, along with growing rates of the very poor and very wealthy. Today Charlestown is a largely residential neighborhood, with much housing near the waterfront, overlooking the Boston skyline. Charlestown is home to many historic sites, hospitals and organizations, with access from the Orange Line Sullivan Square or Community College stops or the I-93 expressway.

== History ==
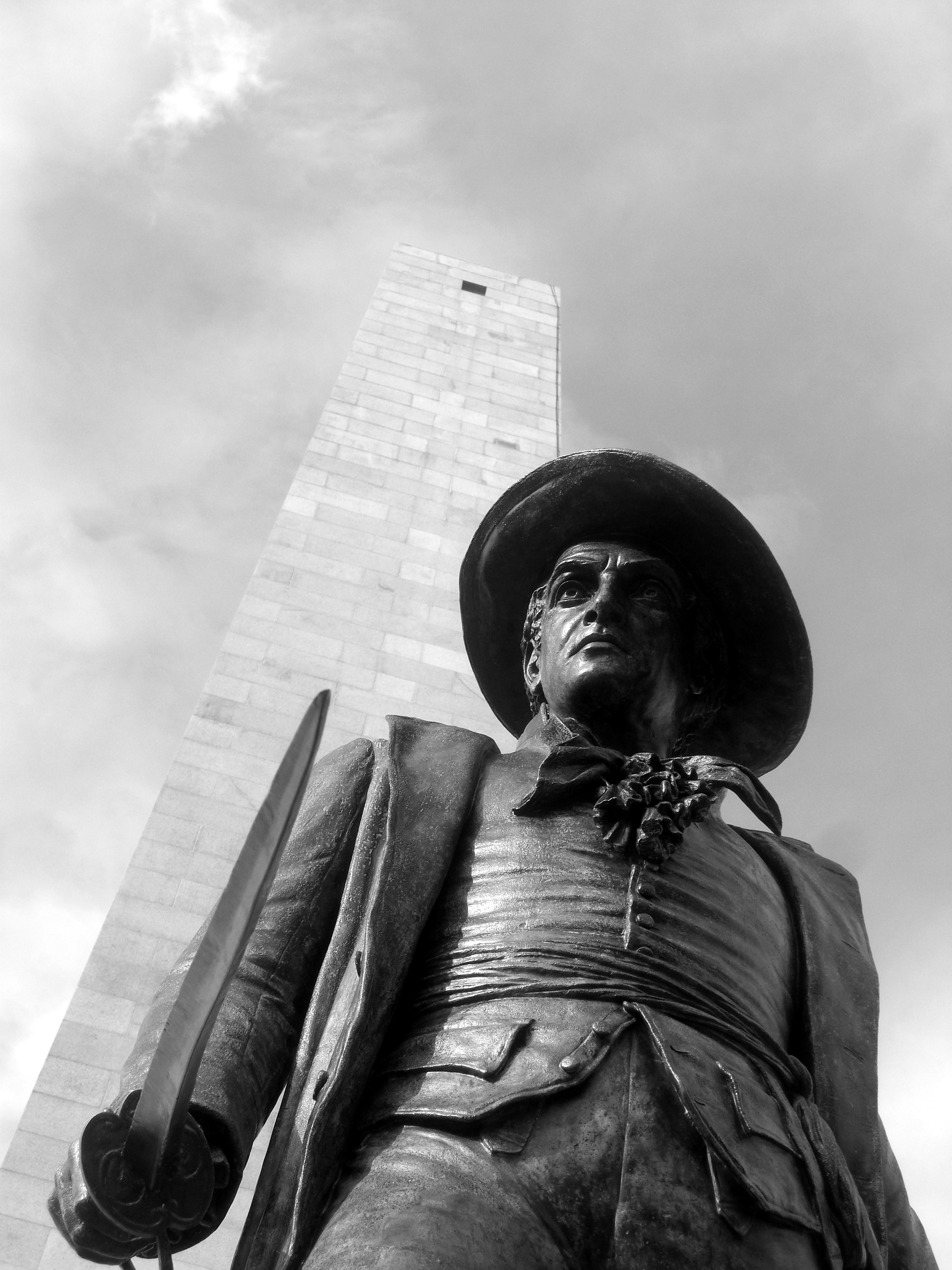
The Bunker Hill Monument and William Prescott Statue

Thomas and Jane Walford were the original English settlers of the peninsula between the Charles and the Mystic. They were given a grant by Sir Robert Gorges, with whom they had settled at Wessagusset (Weymouth) in September 1623 and arrived at what they called Mishawaum in 1624. John Endicott, first governor of Massachusetts Bay Colony, sent William, Richard and Ralph Sprague to Mishawaum to lay out a settlement. Thomas Walford, acting as an interpreter with the Massachusett Indians, negotiated with the local sachem Wonohaquaham for Endicott and his people to settle there. Although Walford had a virtual monopoly on the region's available furs, he welcomed the newcomers and helped them in any way he could, unaware that his Episcopalian religious beliefs would cause him to be banished from Massachusetts to Portsmouth, New Hampshire within three years.

Originally a Puritan English city during the Colonial era, Charlestown proper was founded in 1628 and settled July 4, 1629, by Thomas Graves, Increase Nowell, Simon Hoyt, the Rev. Francis Bright, and the Spragues (Ralph, Richard, & William Sprague), among some 100 others who preceded the Great Migration. John Winthrop's company stopped here for some time in 1630, before deciding to accept the invitation of William Blaxton to settle across the Charles River with him on the Shawmut peninsula. This was the first act in the foundation of the city of Boston.

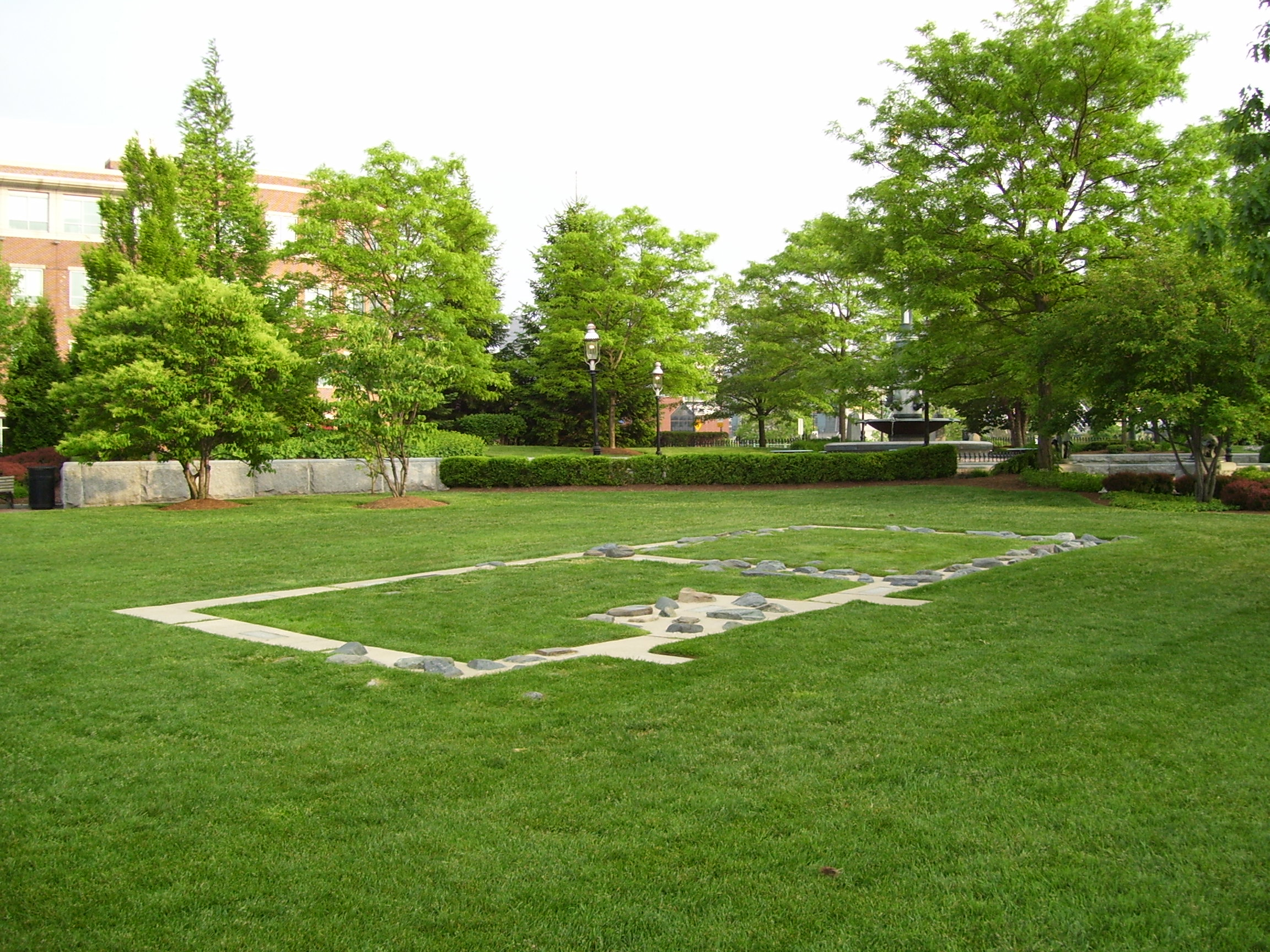
1629 site of Puritan leader John Winthrop's "Great House" in City Square, uncovered during the Big Dig

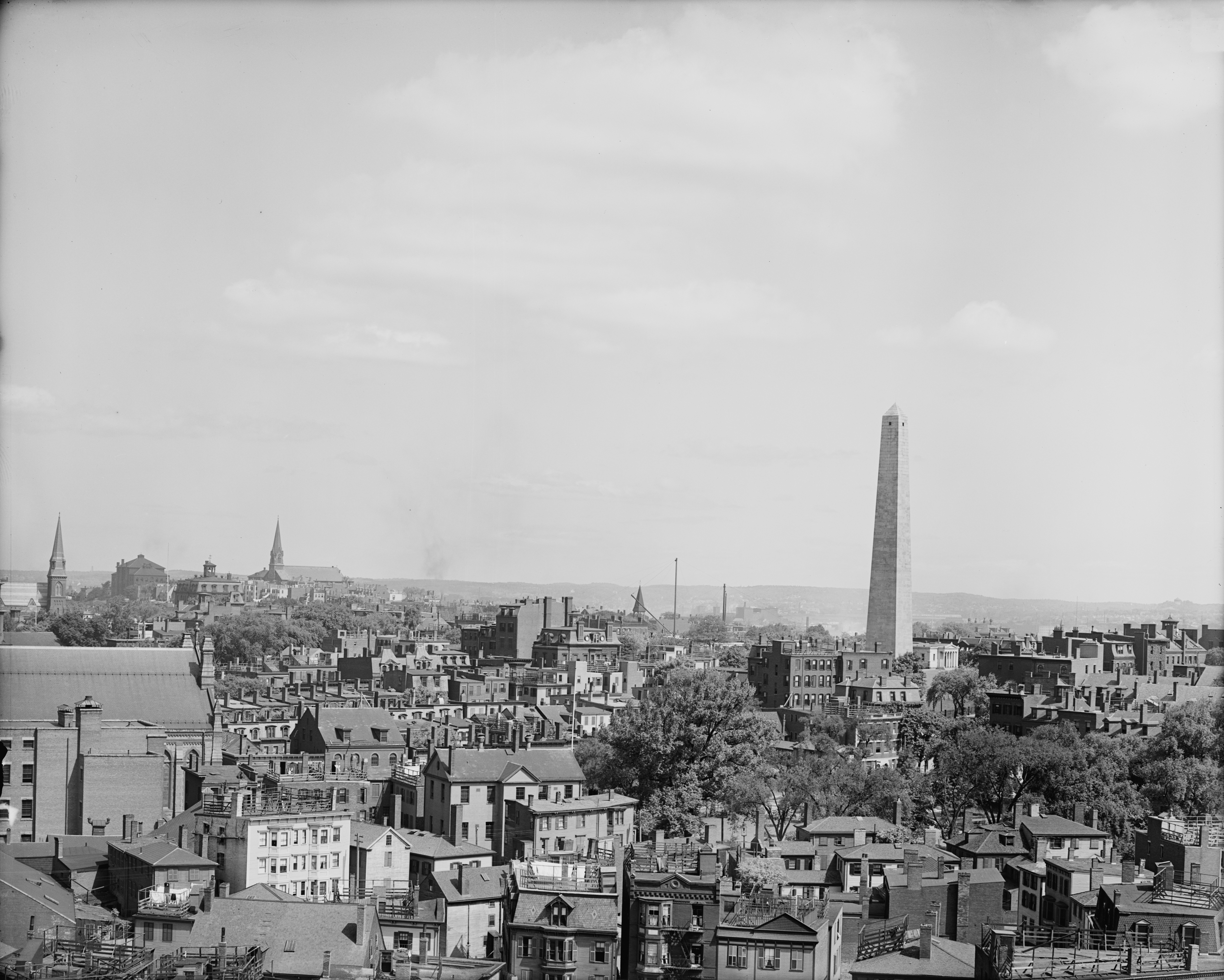
Bird's-eye view of Boston, Charlestown, and Bunker Hill, between 1890 and 1910

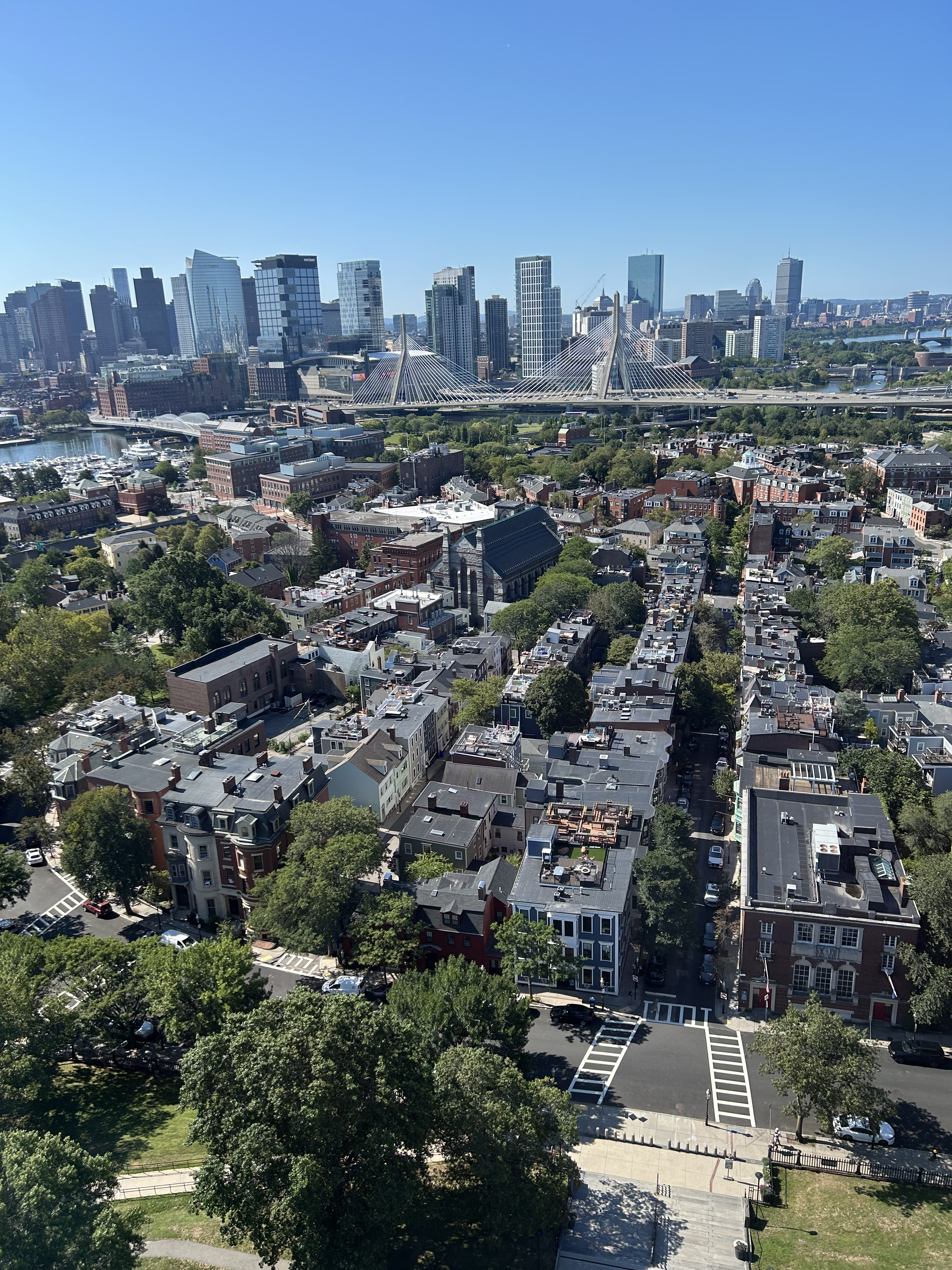
A view facing South of Charlestown from atop the Bunker Hill Monument in 2025, with the Zakim Bridge and West End, Boston in the distance

The territory of Charlestown was initially quite large. From it, Woburn was separated in 1642, Malden in 1649 (including what is now Melrose and Everett) and Stoneham in 1725. South Medford, the land south of the Mystic River (now surrounded by Somerville), was known as "Mistick Field" and was transferred from Charlestown to Medford in 1754. This grant also included the "Charlestown Wood Lots" (the Medford part of the Middlesex Fells), and part of what was at the time Woburn (now Winchester). Other parts of Medford were transferred to Charlestown in 1811. Still-rural Somerville was split off in 1842 as Charlestown was urbanizing. Everett, Burlington, Arlington and Cambridge also acquired areas originally allocated to Charlestown. Landfill operations eliminated the narrow Charlestown Neck that connected the northwest end of the Charlestown Peninsula to the mainland at Sullivan Square.

On June 17, 1775, the Charlestown Peninsula was the site of the Battle of Bunker Hill, named for a hill at the northwest end of the peninsula near Charlestown Neck. British troops unloaded at Moulton's Point and much of the battle took place on Breed's Hill, which overlooked the harbor from about 400 yards off the southern end of the peninsula. Charlestown, including its wharves and dockyards, was almost completely torched during the battle by British forces. The town was not appreciably rebuilt until the end of hostilities but, in 1786, the first bridge across the Charles River connected Boston with Charlestown. An 87-acre (35 ha) Navy Yard was established in 1800; Charlestown State Prison opened in 1805. The Bunker Hill Monument was erected between 1827 and 1843 using Quincy granite brought to the site by a combination of purpose-built railway and barge. Notable businesses included the Bunker Hill Breweries (1821) and Schrafft's candy company (1861).

The Charlestown Branch Railroad opened in 1840 to Sweet's Wharf. Tudor Wharf was the departure point for the ships of the Tudor Ice Company.

Around the 1860s an influx of Irish immigrants arrived in Charlestown. The area long remained an Irish and Catholic stronghold similar to South Boston, Somerville, and Dorchester, to the extent that the informal demonym "Townie" continues to imply the working-class Irish, as opposed to newer immigrants.

During the Civil War, over 26,000 men joined the Union Army and Navy at the Navy Yard, which was also responsible for constructing some of the most famous vessels of the conflict: the Merrimack, the Hartford, and the Monadnock. Following the war, the city commissioned Martin Milmore to construct its civil war memorial, dedicated in 1872 and still standing in the community's Training Field.

The city developed a water supply from the Mystic Lakes and, on October 7, 1873, a vote was held to determine whether Charlestown should leave Middlesex County and join Boston as part of Suffolk County. Out of its 32,040 residents, 2,240 voted in support of the merger and 1,947 opposed. Boston residents also approved the question, 5,960–1,868. Charlestown's separate city government was dissolved the next year.

During the early 1960s, the city initiated plans to demolish and redevelop sixty percent of the housing in Charlestown. In 1963, the Boston Redevelopment Authority (BRA) held a town meeting to discuss their development plans with the community. The BRA's dealings with Boston's West End had created an atmosphere of distrust towards urban renewal in Boston, and Charlestown residents opposed the plan by an overwhelming majority. By 1965, the plan had been reduced to tearing down only eleven percent of the neighborhood, as well as the removal of the elevated rail tracks.

Throughout the 1960s until the mid-1990s, Charlestown was infamous for its Irish Mob presence. Charlestown's McLaughlin Brothers were involved in a gang war with neighboring Somerville's Winter Hill Gang, during the Irish Mob Wars of the 1960s. In the late 1980s, however, Charlestown underwent a massive Yuppie gentrification process similar to that of the South End. Drawn to its proximity to downtown and its colonial, red-brick, row-house housing stock, similar to that of Beacon Hill, many yuppie and upper-middle-class professionals moved to the neighborhood. In the late 1990s, additional gentrification took place, similar to that in neighboring Somerville. Today the neighborhood is a mix of yuppies, upper-middle-class and middle-class residents, housing projects, and a small working-class.

One of the oldest neighborhoods of Boston, Charlestown is home to the Bunker Hill Monument and historic Charlestown Navy Yard. Charlestown today is a mainly residential neighborhood with an institutional presence. Major institutions include Bunker Hill Community College, Spaulding Rehabilitation Center, and a facility of Massachusetts General Hospital. Many commercial ventures line the Mystic River along Medford Street and Terminal Street. The Navy Yard, home to USS Constitution, is now part of the Boston National Historical Park, which marks the southern edge of the neighborhood. The waterfront has two marinas, Constitution Marina and Shipyard Quarters Marina.

== Geography ==
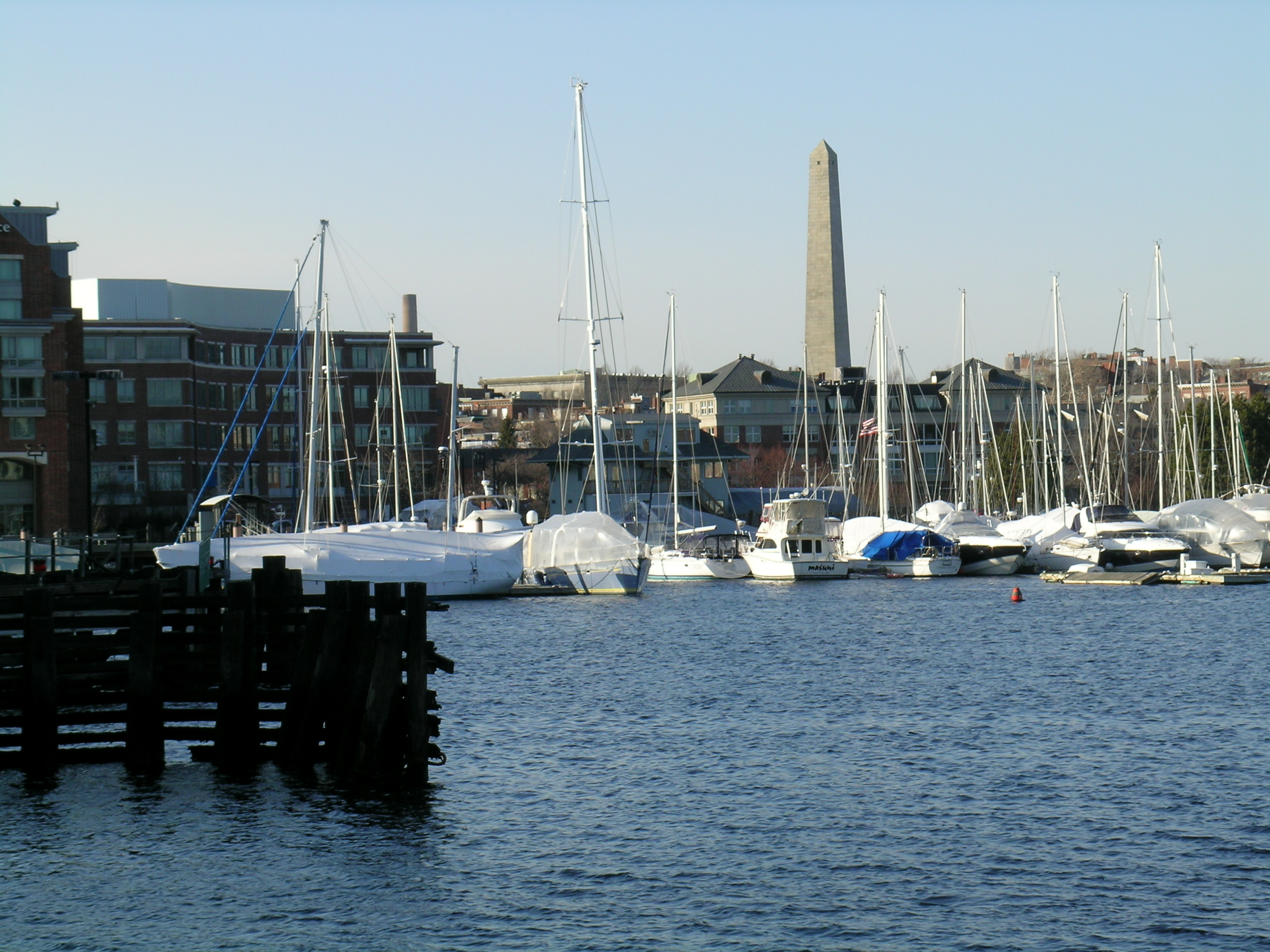
Sailboats moored on the Charlestown side of the Charles River with Bunker Hill Monument in the distance

Charlestown is located north of downtown Boston on a peninsula extending southeastward between the Charles River and the Mystic River.

City Square in the southern part of Charlestown was the location of the city hall before annexation by Boston. It is also the terminus of the Charlestown Bridge and the former Warren Bridge, and was formerly a stop on the Charlestown Elevated. The Central Artery was built between 1951 and 1954, routing elevated ramps through City Square. The Central Artery North Area (CANA) project moved these underground, into the City Square Tunnel, making way for a revitalized surface park.

The .17-acre (0.069 ha) Thompson Square is located at the confluence of Main Street, Dexter Row, Green Street, and Austin Street. Thompson Square station was formerly a stop on the Charlestown Elevated.

A small portion of Charlestown is north of the Mystic River, containing the northern approach to the Malden Bridge and now the entrance to Encore Boston Harbor (which made jurisdiction over the casino a matter of dispute). This land was formerly a peninsula, but landfill has more completely connected it to the mainland of Everett. This boundary was part of the original 1649 separation of Malden from Charlestown, where the Penny Ferry operated at the time; the first bridge opened on the site in 1787.

Two small hills mostly covered in residential buildings fill the interior of the neighborhood: Bunker Hill, which is more northerly, and Breed's Hill, which is the site of the Bunker Hill Monument. Bunker Hill was named after George Bunker, who had owned it during early settlement in the 1600s.

== Arts and culture ==
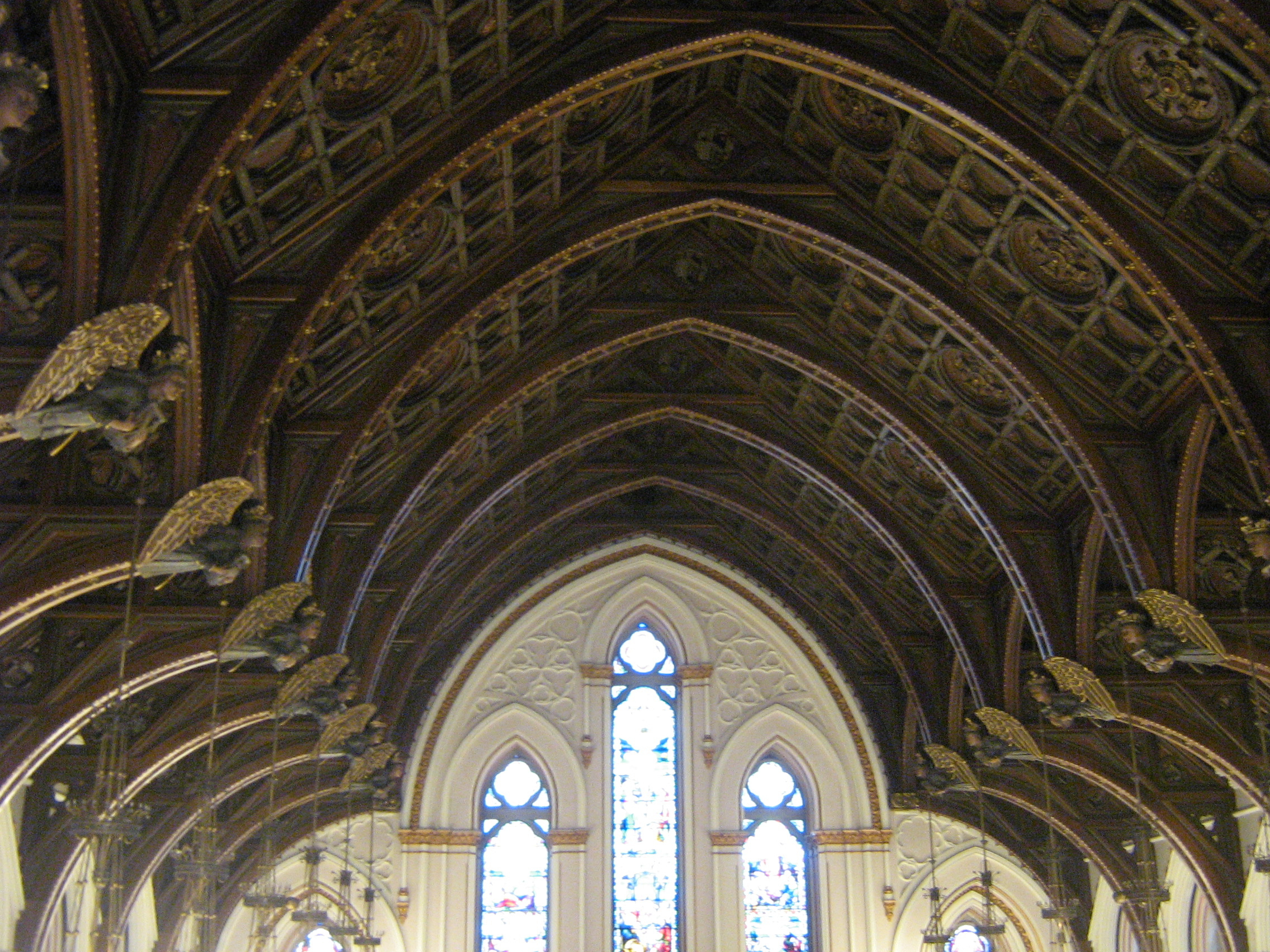
Interior of St. Mary's Church (1887–1893)

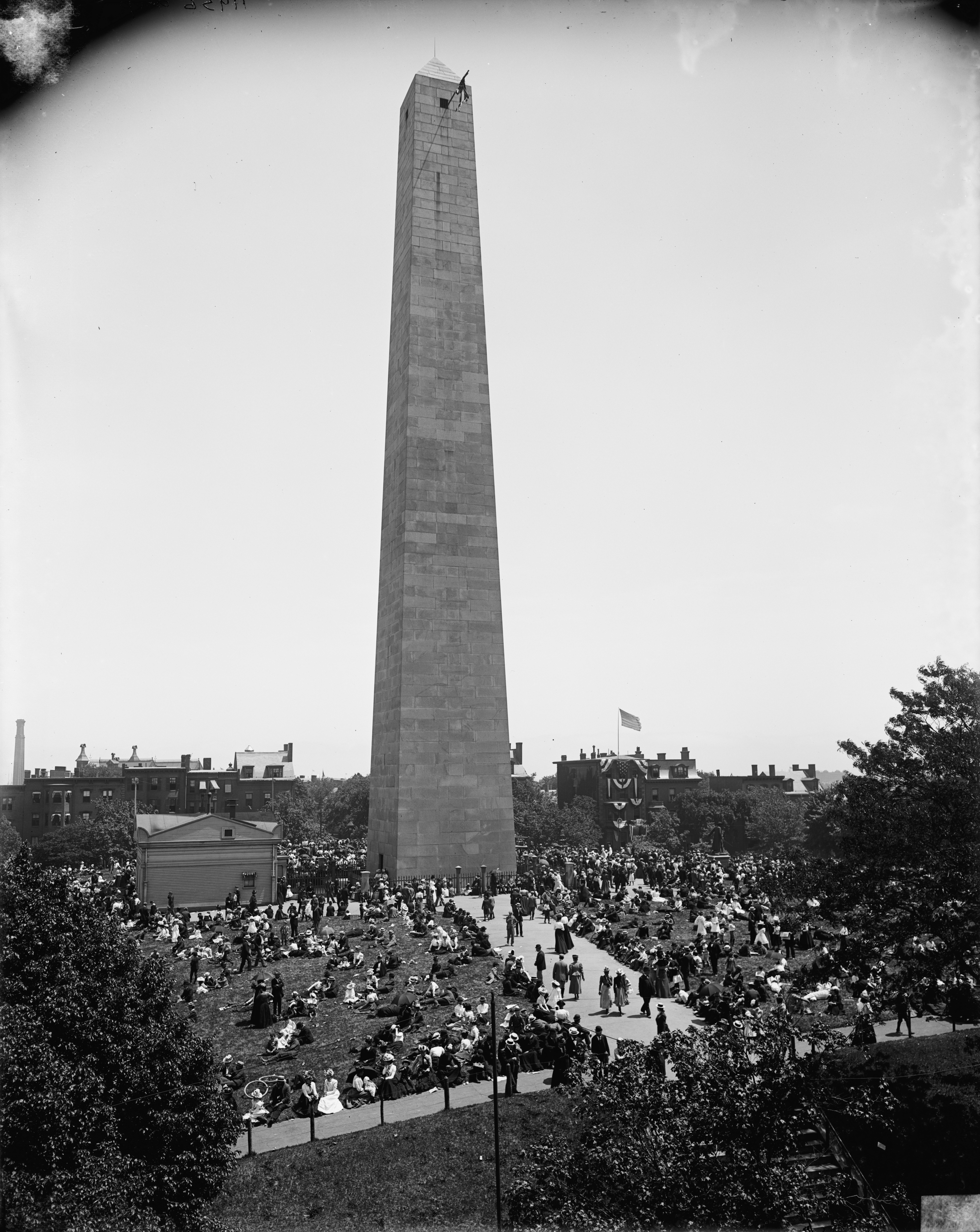
Bunker Hill Monument. Bunker Hill Day, Boston, and Charlestown, between 1890 and 1901

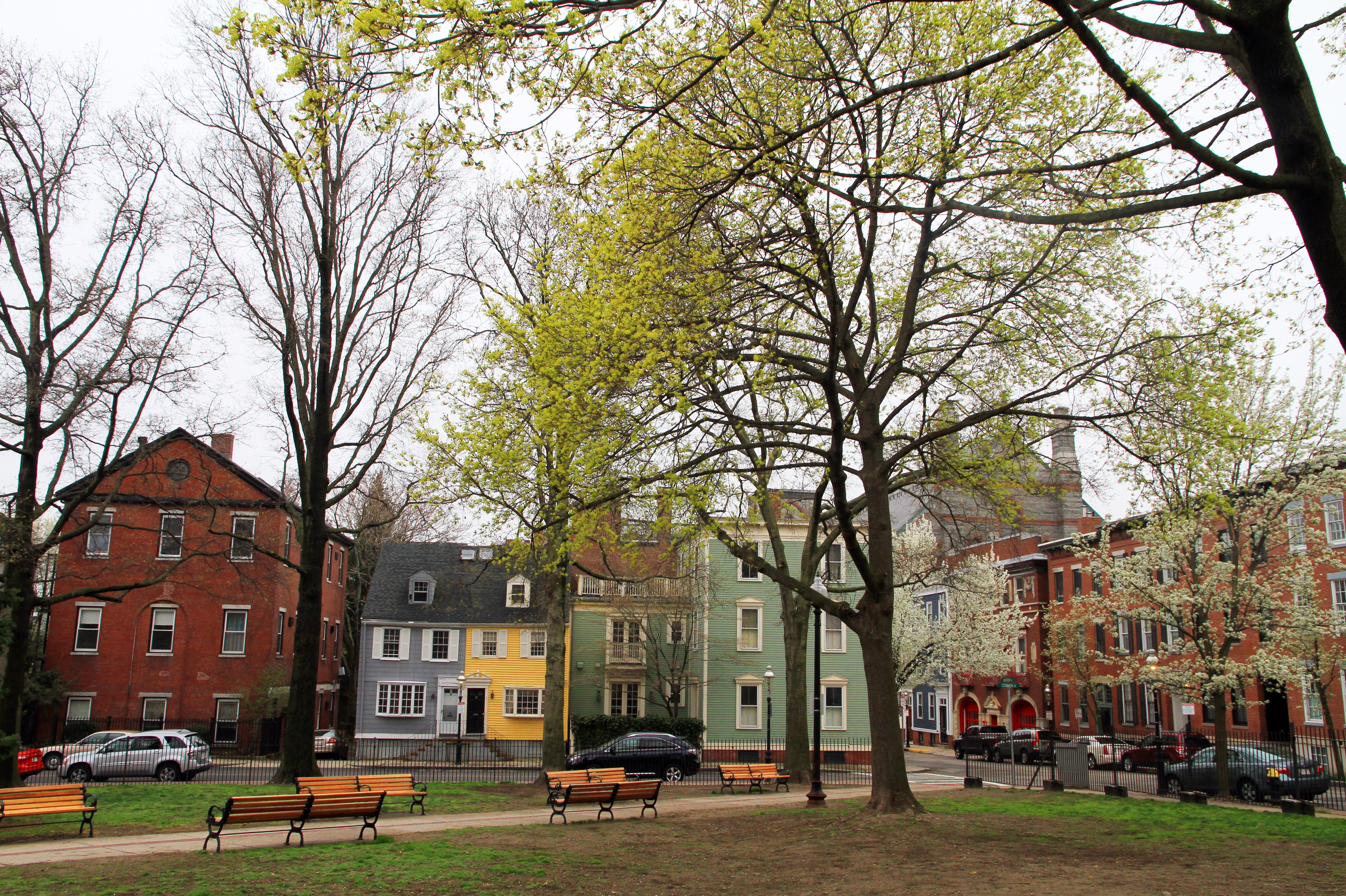
Winthrop Square

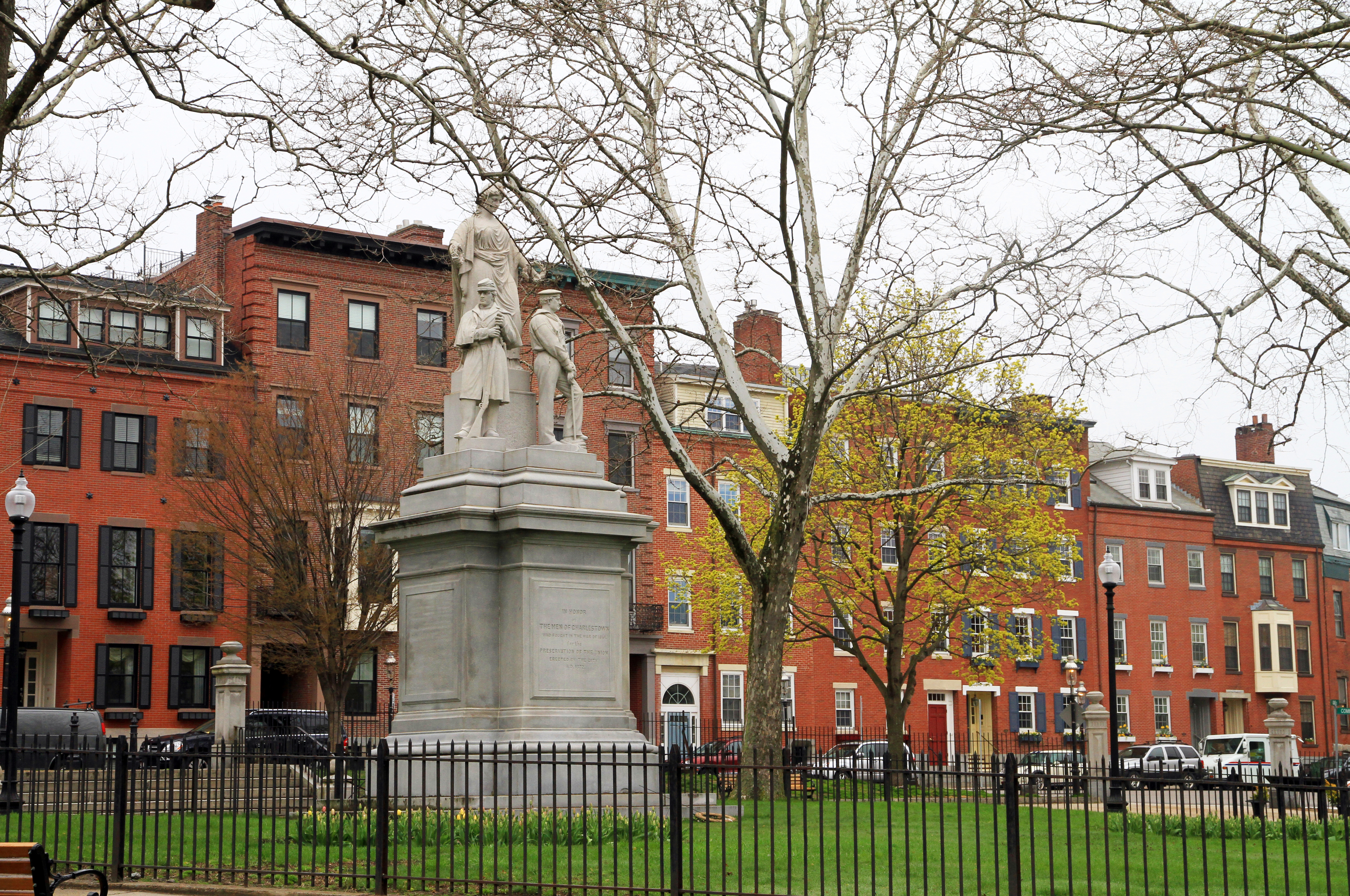
Charlestown Civil War Memorial

Charlestown has many places of historical interest, some of which are included along the northern end of Boston's Freedom Trail. The Freedom Trail ends at the Bunker Hill Monument commemorating the famous Battle of Bunker Hill, an early major battle in the American Revolutionary War. Launched in 1797, the USS Constitution is the oldest commissioned vessel in the US Navy and the oldest warship in the world still afloat. Today it is docked in the Charlestown Navy Yard, today part of the National Park Service. Charlestown was also the location from which Paul Revere began his famous "midnight ride" before the Battles of Lexington and Concord. A restaurant opened in 1780 and still in operation, Warren Tavern, claims to have been one of Revere's favorite taverns. Of Charlestown's churches, St. Mary's (1887–1893) is considered one of the masterpieces of Patrick Keely. In St. John's Episcopal Church, on Devens Street, the central stained glass above the altar is a notable work of William James McPherson, a Boston designer who later designed the stained glass for the Connecticut State Capitol.

The Warren Tavern first opened in 1780. It is located at 2 Pleasant Street. The building was one of the first built after the Battle of Bunker Hill. The Tavern took its name from Joseph Warren, American Patriot who played a key role in the American Revolution and was killed in the Battle of Bunker Hill. It was Warren who directed Paul Revere and William Dawes to send the message to Samuel Adams and John Hancock that the British were setting out to raid the town of Concord. Warren's friend Captain Eliphelet Newell decided to build a tavern named after his friend. George Washington visited the tavern when he came to Massachusetts to visit his friend Benjamin Frothingham. After the Tavern was closed in 1813, the building served other purposes, and then was saved in the 1970s. The Tavern was reopened in 1972.

The Constitution Yacht Charter is located on Boston Harbor.

== Demographics ==
Historical population
Census	Pop.	Note	%±
1790	1,583		—
1800	2,751		73.8%
1810	4,959		80.3%
1820	6,591		32.9%
1830	8,783		33.3%
1840	11,484		30.8%
1850	17,216		49.9%
1860	25,065		45.6%
1870	28,323		13.0%

According to the U.S. Census Bureau in its 2007–2011 report, the population of Charlestown is 16,685, comprising 7,843 males and 8,842 females. The largest age group is 25 to 29 years (14.6%), the second-largest is 30 to 34 (12.3%), and the third-largest is 35 to 39 (9.7%).

The majority of the population is white at 12,587 (75.4%). Minorities include Black or African at 1,227 (7.4%), Asian at 1,253 (7.5%), Hispanic or Latino at 1,227 (7.4%), and those of two or more races at 371 (2.2%). In recent years, the percentage of minorities living in Charlestown has increased from 4.9% of the population in 1990 to 23.5% in 2010. The population consists of 15.9% who are foreign born, 48.5% of whom are naturalized citizens, and 51.5% who are not.

The median household income is $89,017, and the median family income is $100,725. The median income for whites is $103,652; that for Blacks or African Americans, $12,143; for Hispanics or Latinos, $30,833; for Asians, $61,875; and for others, $16,876.

Seventeen percent of the population and 37% of the children live below the Federal Poverty Line. Of married couples, 32.4% are living in poverty with families. Of male householders with no wife present, 3.4% live in poverty; and of female householders with no husband, 64.2% live in poverty.

=== Race and ancestry ===
Charlestown (02129) Racial Breakdown of Population (2017)
Race	Percentage of 02129 population	Percentage of Massachusetts population	Percentage of United States population	ZIP Code-to-State Difference	ZIP Code-to-USA Difference
White	75.3%	81.3%	76.6%	–6.0%	–1.3%
White (Non-Hispanic)	70.6%	72.1%	60.7%	–1.5%	+9.9%
Hispanic	11.5%	11.9%	18.1%	–0.4%	–6.6%
Black	11.1%	8.8%	13.4%	+2.3%	–2.3%
Asian	7.6%	6.9%	5.8%	+0.7%	+2.8%
Native Americans/Hawaiians	0.0%	0.6%	1.5%	–0.6%	–1.5%
Two or more races	2.1%	2.4%	2.7%	–0.3%	–0.6%

According to the 2012–2016 American Community Survey 5-Year Estimates, the largest ancestry groups in ZIP Code 02129 are:

Ancestry	Percentage of 02129 population	Percentage of Massachusetts population	Percentage of United States population	ZIP Code-to-State Difference	ZIP Code-to-USA Difference
Irish	42.20%	21.16%	10.39%	+21.05%	+31.82%
Italian	15.18%	13.19%	5.39%	+1.99%	+9.78%
German	10.55%	6.00%	14.40%	+4.54%	–3.86%
English	10.07%	9.77%	7.67%	+0.29%	+2.40%
Chinese	5.59%	2.28%	1.24%	+3.31%	+4.35%
American	5.48%	4.26%	6.89%	+1.21%	–1.42%
Polish	5.08%	4.67%	2.93%	+0.41%	+2.14%
West Indian	4.18%	1.96%	0.90%	+2.22%	+3.27%
Sub-Saharan African	3.52%	2.00%	1.01%	+1.52%	+2.50%
French	3.36%	6.82%	2.56%	–3.46%	+0.80%
Scottish	3.13%	2.28%	1.71%	+0.85%	+1.42%
Haitian	2.78%	1.15%	0.31%	+1.62%	+2.47%
European	2.33%	1.08%	1.23%	+1.25%	+1.10%
Russian	2.12%	1.65%	0.88%	+0.47%	+1.24%
French Canadian	1.88%	3.91%	0.65%	–2.02%	+1.23%
Cape Verdean	1.63%	0.97%	0.03%	+0.66%	+1.60%
Portuguese	1.56%	4.40%	0.43%	–2.84%	+1.13%
Eastern European	1.36%	0.42%	0.17%	+0.94%	+1.19%
Greek	1.33%	1.22%	0.40%	+0.11%	+0.93%
Puerto Rican	1.33%	4.52%	1.66%	–3.19%	–0.33%
Dutch	1.00%	0.62%	1.32%	+0.38%	–0.32%

== Government and infrastructure ==
The Massachusetts Department of Correction operated the Charlestown State Prison from 1805 until its closure in 1955. The former prison site is occupied by Bunker Hill Community College.

The Boston Navy Yard was located in Charlestown from 1801 until it was closed in 1974.

The United States Postal Service operates the Charlestown Post Office.

=== Education ===
Boston's Charlestown neighborhood is served by the Boston Public Schools system. There are also private educational institutions within the neighborhood.

==== Primary and secondary schools ====
- Harvard-Kent Elementary School
- Warren-Prescott K–8 School
- Charlestown High School
- Horace Mann School for the Deaf and Hard of Hearing

==== Colleges and universities ====
- Bunker Hill Community College's main campus
- Mass General Brigham University of Health Professions
- Cambridge College

===== Public libraries =====
Boston Public Library operates the Charlestown Branch. The library first opened in the Warren Institution for Savings building on January 7, 1862. The library moved to a larger space in the new Charlestown City Hall in 1869. In 1913 the branch moved to the intersection of Monument Avenue and Monument Square, in proximity to the Bunker Hill Monument. The branch moved to its current location in 1970.

=== Housing policy ===
The Bunker Hill Public Housing has divided Bunker Hill Street into two Charlestowns. The housing development company Corcoran-SunCal plans to make changes and replace the 1,100 affordable units. "While preserving the affordable units, Corcoran-SunCal will also create approximately 1,700 additional market and moderate-rate units". This company will allow all current residents to move back into the housing complex. According to Project Manager Sarah Barnet, "by creating both affordable and market rate housing at the site the area will become a more thriving section of the neighborhood, a destination area for residents from all over a Charlestown and a high quality place for people to live".

== Healthcare ==
- Mass General: Charlestown Healthcare Center – MGH Charlestown Healthcare Center is a part of Massachusetts General Hospital. MGH Charlestown has been providing the Charlestown community since 1968. MGH Charlestown works closely with local school and community organizations to provide programs that truly benefit Charlestown's culturally diverse populations.
- Spaulding Rehabilitation Hospital – outpatient facility.
- NEW Health Charlestown – substance abuse facility with counselors and physicians.

== Transportation ==
The Interstate 93 as the "Northern Expressway viaduct" travels roughly northwest–southeast and passes through the Sullivan Square area. The Interstate act as a boundary of Charlestown neighborhood with points heading west with only two roads heading westward: Cambridge Street in the north and Austin Street/Gilmore Bridge to the south. US 1 diverges with Interstate 93 at the Leonard P. Zakim Bunker Hill Memorial Bridge where US 1 becomes a toll road and passes below Paul Revere Park and City Square before becoming the Tobin Bridge to the City of Chelsea across the Mystic River. State routes passing through Charlestown include 38 to the City of Somerville and 99 to the City of Everett. The sole city-owned road linking the neighborhood Charleston with Downtown Boston is North Washington Street to the Southwest.

According to the Census from 2010 to 2014, 53.7% of the population will drive to work and 30.0% will take some form of public transportation to get to their jobs and Charlestown is well served by public transportation as it is accessible by several forms of public transportation, including train, bus and ferry.

The train transportation is the MBTA Orange Line, the Community College station, located near Bunker Hill Community College and serves the center of the town; and the Sullivan Square station, located on what was once a narrow neck of land referred to as the Charlestown Neck.

Two bus lines serve Charlestown. Both routes start at Sullivan Square. and travel to the Financial District of downtown Boston. The 93 bus goes from Sullivan Station, downtown via Bunker Hill Street and Haymarket Station. The 92 bus runs from Assembly Square Mall, downtown via Sullivan Square Station, Main Street and Haymarket Station.

Charlestown is also accessible via the Charlestown Navy Yard Ferry Terminal where the MBTA operates a ferry between the Navy Yard and Long Wharf (near the New England Aquarium), making this a popular choice among both commuters and tourists.

The Boston Harborwalk and the Freedom Trail pass through the neighborhood.

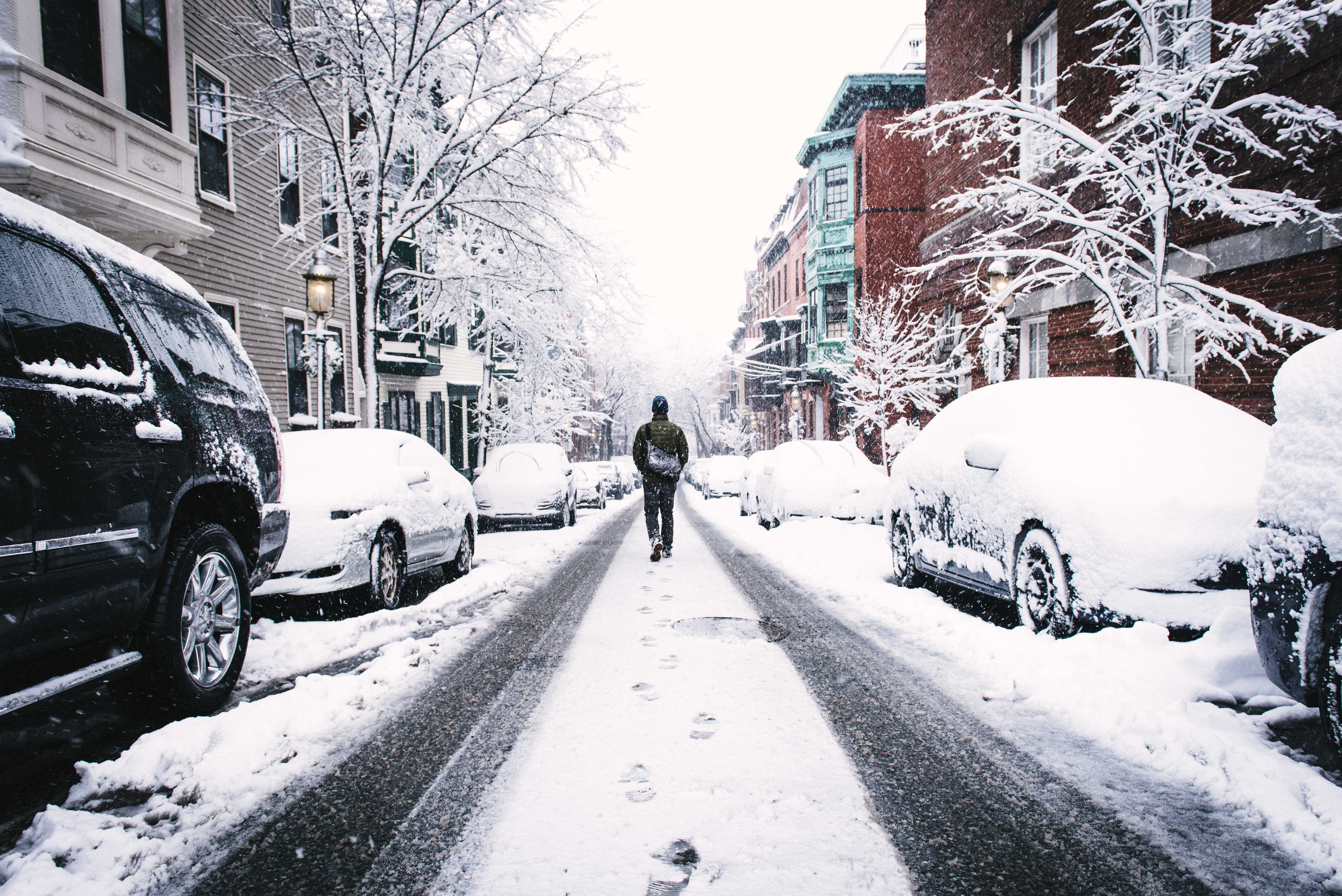
Walking as a means of transport in Charlestown.

== In popular culture ==
=== Films ===
- Portions of the 1994 film Blown Away were shot in Charlestown and nearby in Boston Harbor
- Scenes in Celtic Pride (1996) were filmed in Charlestown
- In Good Will Hunting (1997), the character Dr. Sean Maguire teaches psychology in Charlestown's Bunker Hill Community College
- Monument Ave. (1998) about an Irish-American criminal
- Mystic River (2003), was partly filmed in Charlestown
- Portions of The Departed (2006) were filmed in Charlestown (standing in for South Boston)
- The Town (2010) is about bank robbers from Charlestown

=== Television ===
- The 2019 television series City on a Hill is based in Charlestown

=== Music ===
- The minatory song The Boston Burglar from the 1880s, about a bank robber, contains the lines:

But the jury they found me guilty,
And the judge he wrote it down,
"For breaking of the Union Bank,
You are sent to Charlestown."

- The Bunker Hill housing development, an area known for its crime and drug use, is featured on the front cover of Blood for Blood's 2004 album Serenity.

== Notable people ==
- Charles R. Adams (1834–1900), Charlestown native, opera singer
- Charles B. Atwood (1849–1895), born in Charlestown, architect who designed the Reliance Building, among others
- William Austin (1778–1841), born in Charlestown, state legislator and author
- Richard Austin (1598–1638), born in Titchfield, Hampshire, England, and died in Charlestown, Middlesex, Massachusetts; emigrated to "New England" on the Bevis
- Loammi Baldwin (1780–1838), civil engineer
- Albert Gallatin Blanchard (1810–1891), born in Charlestown, Confederate general in the American Civil War
- Marion Howard Brazier (1850–1935), journalist, editor, lecturer, clubwoman
- Eleanor Baldwin Cass (1874–1966), fencer
- Shano Collins (1885–1955), baseball player for Boston Red Sox and for 1917 and 1919 World Series teams of Chicago White Sox
- Thomas Dalton (1794–1883), and his wife Lucy, African American abolitionists and education activists
- Samuel Dexter (1761–1816), prominent lawyer and cabinet member under John Adams
- James Frothingham (1786–1864), portrait artist
- Nathaniel Gorham (1738–1796), a member of the Continental Congress
- Matt Grzelcyk (b. 1994), NHL hockey player for the Boston Bruins
- John Harvard (1607–1638), English benefactor and namesake of Harvard University
- Robert Haswell (1768–c.1801), maritime trader and officer in the United States Navy during the Quasi-War with France
- Oliver Holden (1765–1831), composer of hymns
- Charles Wilson Killam (1871–1961), professor of architectural construction and engineering at Harvard University, born in Charlestown
- Howie Long (b. 1960), Pro Football Hall of Famer and television commentator
- Samuel F. B. Morse (1791–1872), inventor of the telegraph and Morse code
- Woolson Morse (1858–1897), early Broadway composer
- Jack O'Callahan (b. 1957), part of the 1980 Miracle On Ice team. Played for the Chicago Blackhawks and New Jersey Devils in the NHL.
- John Boyle O'Reilly (1844–1890), Irish-born poet, journalist and fiction writer, lived in Charlestown on Winthrop Square
- Alice May Bates Rice (1868–?), opera singer
- Robert Sedgwick (c.1611–1656), English merchant, first major general of the Massachusetts Bay Colony and first governor General of Jamaica
- Matthew Sherman, mayor of San Diego 1891–1893, born in Charlestown
- Daniel C. Stillson (1830–1899), inventor of the Stillson pipe wrench
- John Hanson Twombly (1814–1893), President of the University of Wisconsin, Methodist minister
- Sarah Emily York (1819–1851), Baptist missionary to Greece

== See also ==
- Mayors of Charlestown
