= React Media =

American media company

React Media, LLC
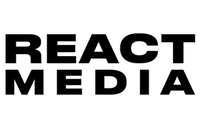
- Formerly: Fine Brothers Productions, Inc. (2011–2014); Fine Brothers Entertainment, Inc. (2014–2017); FBE, Inc. (2017–2019); FBE, LLC (2019–2021)
- Industry: Video production
- Genre: Entertainment, Reality show
- Founded: December 13, 2011; 14 years ago in Los Angeles, California, U.S.
- Founders: Benny Fine; Rafi Fine
- Headquarters: 135 W Magnolia Blvd, Burbank, California
- Owner: Benny and Rafi Fine (2011–2021); Electric Monster Media/ZATV (2021–present)
- Website: reactmedia.com

React Media, LLC (also known as React and formerly Fine Brothers Productions, Inc., Fine Brothers Entertainment, Inc., FBE, Inc., and FBE, LLC) is an American digital media and entertainment company founded by brothers Benny and Rafi Fine. The Fines began creating content in 2003 and later founded their eponymous Fine Brothers Productions in 2011. Under the Fines, the company was known for producing various series on YouTube, including React and MyMusic.

React Media's YouTube channels include React, Bullseye, and People vs Food. (Note: In September 2020, the company rebranded their channels FBE, FBE2, and React as React, FBE, and Replay, respectively.) The company also produces channels on Facebook (FBE, FBE Shows, Do They Know It, What Would My Kid Do, and Reverse Ratings), Snapchat (Try Not To and React) and Instagram's IGTV. React has produced multiple shows (React to That, Celebs React, Six Degrees of Everything, Emo Dad, and Sing It!), and released the feature film F the Prom, in 2017. FBE has over eight billion views and over 32 million subscribers.

Because of the controversy over an attempt to license and trademark the term "React", as well as the names of their series, React Media's channels lost hundreds of thousands of subscribers in early 2016. In 2020, the company became embroiled in allegations by both current and former employees of systemic and casual racism in the workplace, as well as the way in which they presented their content. In November 2021, the Fines ended their association with the company after it was acquired by Electric Monster Media (now ZATV).

== Creators ==
Benny (born March 19, 1981) and Rafi Fine (born June 9, 1983) grew up in an Orthodox Jewish family in Brooklyn. The Fine Brothers began creating comedy sketches in adolescence upon receiving their first video camera. Benny, the elder brother, would "rope [Rafi] into making all kinds of weird stuff". They spent most of their teen years in Sullivan County, New York. Benny started college at age 15, while Rafi attended Dickinson College for two years before transferring to Hunter College, where he got a degree in film studies. The two began entertaining their friends with short sketches and full-length comedies shot with action figures.

They created a live action feature film in 2000 that made its way into comedy film festivals, and that they were planning to create a feature each year, hoping one would soon help them break into Hollywood. Despite winning young filmmaker awards, they soon concluded this method would not be the best path and decided their future was on the internet, which they viewed at the time as the new film festival. The brothers created their first website in 2003 and uploaded their first web video in 2004.

== History ==
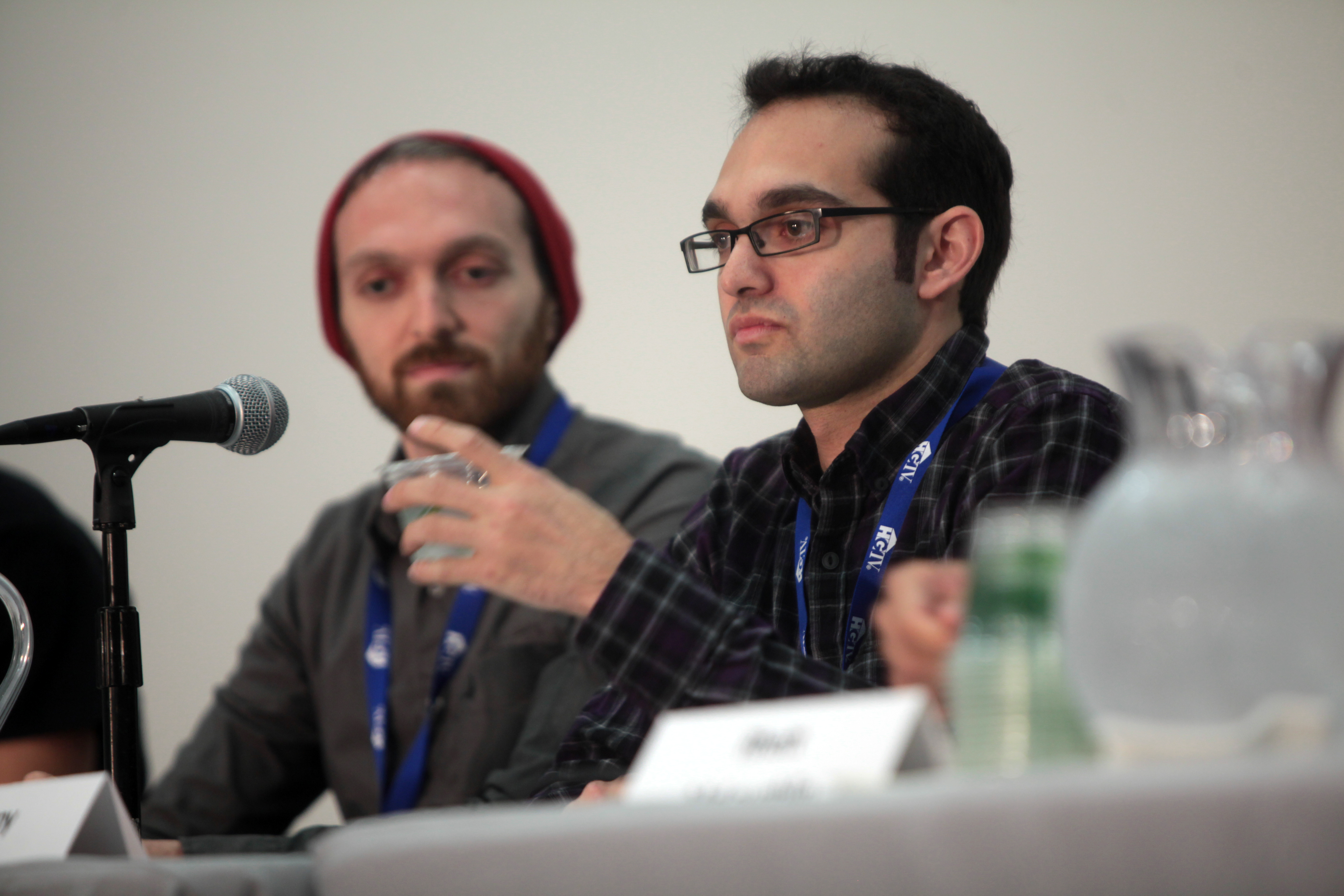
Rafi (left) and Benny Fine (right) at VidCon 2014

The Fine brothers created the YouTube channel TheFineBros (later renamed Fine Brothers Entertainment, or FBE) in 2007. In 2009, the brothers joined Maker Studios, a then newly-formed incubator for YouTube talent. They described themselves as "the head of production and head of creative." The duo ran Maker Studios throughout 2009 and were responsible for the early success and planning for what became known as multi-channel networks (MCNs).

They launched a secondary channel (TheFineBros2) in May 2009 and made YouTube their full-time jobs in July 2010. On October 16, 2010, they uploaded the first episode of Kids React. This was the first series in what would later become their React franchise on YouTube. They incorporated the video production company as Fine Brothers Productions, Inc. on December 13, 2011. Between 2009 and 2012, the brothers received media coverage in The Wall Street Journal, Time magazine, Variety, and MSNBC.

The Fine Brothers were guest judges on the second season of the web series Internet Icon in 2013. In December 2013, the duo left Revision3 to sign with Fullscreen though remained vocal about YouTube multi-channel networks, devoting a segment in their update vlog series, Fine Time, discussing how to navigate them.

A third channel was launched in 2014, called React, to expand their React content. On April 30, 2014, it was announced that a spin-off of FBE's React series called React to That was going to be aired on Nickelodeon. FBE said in an episode of Fine Time, however, that they planned on continuing to upload YouTube videos consistently. Nickelodeon aired 12 episodes of the show. The brothers also created and hosted the TV series Six Degrees of Everything that aired on TruTV in 2015. In early 2016, New York detailed that their company employed around 50 people.

On January 26, 2016, FBE announced they would license and trademark their existing React series and let creators create their own "React" content. In particular, FBE applied to trademark, among other terms, the word "react", which is used in the title of many other YouTube videos unrelated to FBE's YouTube channel. The announcement was met with a backlash from some of their viewers and fellow YouTube content creators, many of whom believed FBE was attempting to prohibit the creation of reaction videos by people unaffiliated with their channel. In response, the company promised they would "not be trying to take revenue from other types of reaction videos, and will not be copyright-striking".

There were also reports that another YouTube channel had produced Seniors React videos just prior to FBE's Elders React series. The backlash led to a dramatic drop in subscribers, with upwards of 675,000 (Note: As of February 22, 2016. Not including positive subs counts.) accounts collectively unsubscribing from the React and FBE channels in protest as of February 22, 2016. On February 1, 2016, FBE stated they had rescinded all React trademarks and trademark applications, discontinued the React World program, and released all previous Content ID claims. FBE removed their original React World announcement video, and their update video, which addressed the initial backlash.

Marc Hustvedt joined FBE as CEO in July 2018, coming from the New York-based digital brand Above Average. Prior to Above Average, Hustvedt was co-founder and CEO of Supergravity Pictures, a digital-first entertainment studio and distributor that was later acquired by Gunpowder & Sky. Hustvedt also is a co-founder of trade publication Tubefilter and the Streamy Awards. At the start of 2019, FBE acquired Officially Pinned, an upstart that creates collectible pins in collaboration with content creators. Officially Pinned gets certified approval from creators and rights-holding partners to vend the pins and works directly with the parties involved to collaborate on the designs—hence the "official" part of the name. Disney pin-trading culture inspired Officially Pinned. As of May 2019, their main channel had more than 19 million subscribers and 7.8 billion video views.

FBE partnered with the interactive video company Eko in July 2019 to produce 12-plus interactive TV pilots that consist of scripted and unscripted formats and game shows and socially driven experiences. Eko and FBE teamed up on the production of Epic Night, a four-episode branching-narrative series about a college-party adventure. For the Eko partnership, FBE established an Interactive Content Lab to expand the studio's interactive storytelling capabilities by developing, funding and shopping new formats.

In summer 2020, during the Black Lives Matter protests among the killing of George Floyd, a video resurfaced which showed Benny Fine in blackface portraying a character in a Degrassi TV show parody by Shane Dawson. In June 2020, former employees spoke out about their experiences working at FBE, which included allegations of racism by the company. In January 2021, Insider published a report, which contained allegations the company cultivated casual racism. One employee claimed she was told at times to have a reactor with lighter skin on the left of video thumbnails. Insider said that in 434 thumbnails that included one person of color and one white person, 238 of them (55%), had the white person on the left side. People interviewed for the article alleged white people were favored to appear in React videos. Another video that resurfaced amidst the scandals was "Hey, It's Milly" and several past videos before React series which contained offensive jokes of sexism, as its calling "edgy comedy" and the brothers describing themselves as the "Trey Parker and Matt Stone of YouTube."

In September 2020, the company announced the rebranding of their channels FBE, FBE2 and REACT as REACT, FBE, and REPLAY, respectively. FBE began restructuring, which led to the layoffs of 17 employees in December 2020. In November 2021, React Media, LLC was acquired by Electric Monster Media (now ZATV), run by CEO Matt Gielen (now Rob Fishman from Brat TV). Benny and Rafi Fine did not join the latter, and are no longer associated with React Media.

== YouTube series ==
React

YouTube information
- Channels: React; Teens React; Bullseye
- Years active: 2007–present
- Subscribers: 20.2 million (main channel); 22.2 million (combined) (Note: Subscribers, broken down by channel: 20.2 million (React) 1.12 million (Teens React) 1.01 million (Bullseye))
- Views: 13.6 billion (main channel); 14.1 billion (combined) (Note: Views, broken down by channel: 13.6 billion (React) 400 million (Teens React) 118 million (Bullseye))
- Last updated: October 22, 2025

=== React series on FBE Channel and React Channel ===
On their main channel, the brothers upload a multitude of series, creating some of the most popular scripted, narrative, and unscripted series including their reaction series. They released behind-the-scenes content, as well as clips from their news podcast All We Know on the secondary channel. FBE launched a series titled Kids React on October 16, 2010, the first video being Kids React to Viral Videos #1 (Double Rainbow, Obama Fail, Twin Rabbits and Snickers Halloween). The Kids React series features The Fine Brothers, off-camera, showing kids several viral videos or popular YouTubers and having the kids react to them.

The series led to spin-offs uploaded on the company's channel, featuring kids, teens, elders, staff, adults (including sub-branches of college kids, parents, etc.) and YouTubers. Because of the increasing success of the React franchise, FBE, in collaboration with Nick Cannon, later developed a television series for Nickelodeon, titled React to That. Later, FBE launched a separate "React" YouTube channel, with additional reaction-related videos, including remixes of past reaction footage and cast members reacting to video games, among other content. Aside from the series that the brothers directed, produced, and uploaded, the duo has uploaded popular interactive YouTube videos. The company's channels are under the YouTube partner program, allowing them to earn money from ad revenues on their videos. Ford and Comedy Central have sponsored them.

=== MyMusic ===
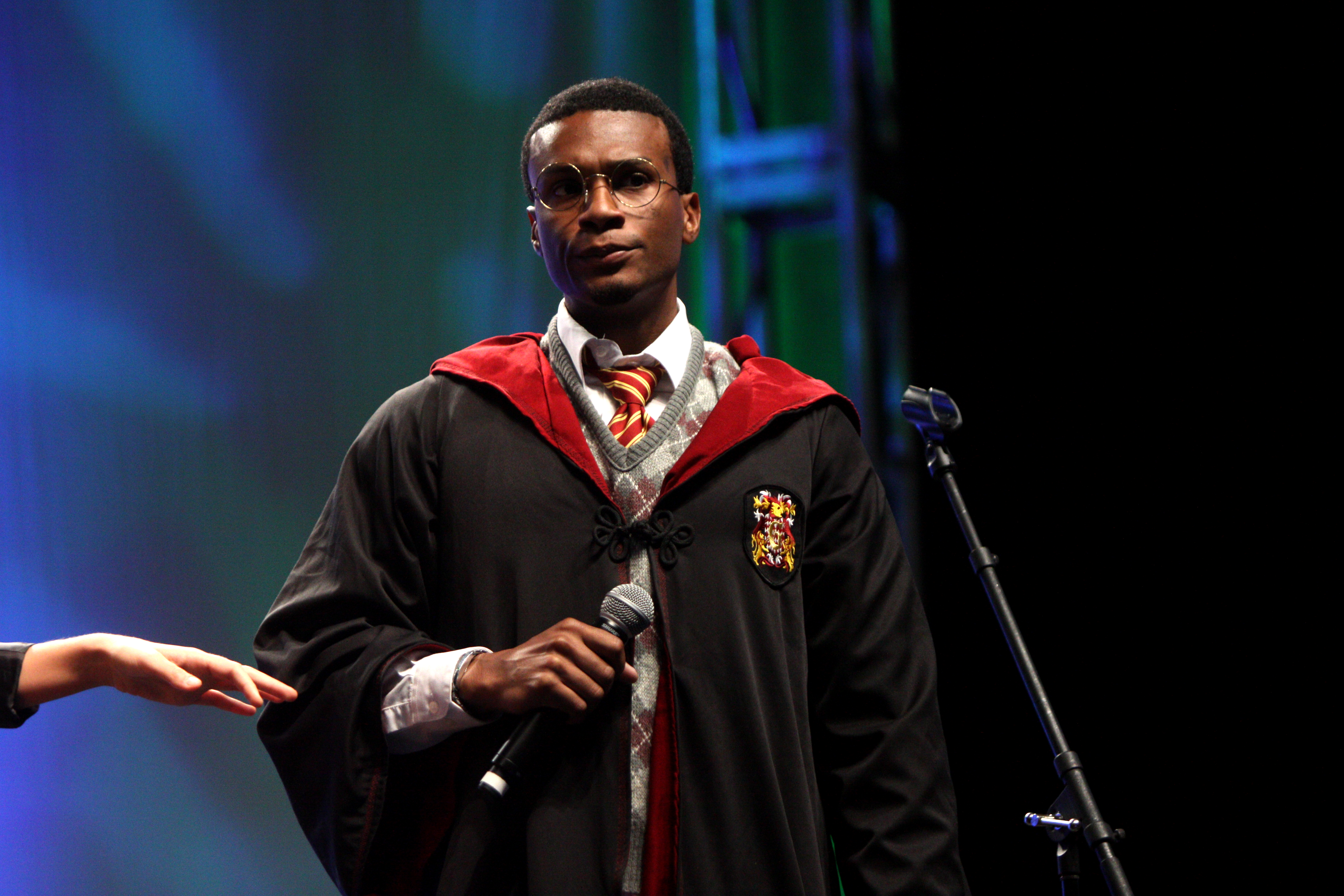
Hip Hop (Nerdcore), a character of MyMusic

FBE is the creator of MyMusic, a sitcom show funded by YouTube's $100 million original channel initiative. MyMusic features a main ensemble cast of Adam Busch, Chris Clowers, Jack Douglass, Tania Gunadi, Grace Helbig, Lainey Lipson (who later appears in Adults React), Jarrett Sleeper and Mychal Thompson and has featured many guest stars, with members of both Kids React and Teens React also appearing. The series has an interactive transmedia aspect, which FBE has spoken on, saying, "To us, new media should be 'new' – and just not just a passive experience. The ability to create new storytelling elements and new ways to entertain audiences is what is so motivating about being a creator at this time." The show revolves around MyMusic, a company led by CEO Indie (portrayed by Adam Busch) who is portrayed as a stereotypical modern-day hipster. Another character on the show, Metal (portrayed by Jarrett Sleeper), is based on the brothers' teenage years. Fine said, "The Metal character comes directly from us when we were teenagers. We were metalheads, full-on." MyMusic has a separate channel on YouTube from the main FBE channel (MyMusicShow), which had over 381,000 subscribers and 28.9 million video views as of July 7, 2013. MyMusic was nominated for nine Streamy Awards in the 3rd installment of the event, with three of the nominations going to the Fine Brothers. The second season premiered on August 20, 2013.

=== Sing It! ===
Sing It! is a musical situation comedy streaming television series created by the Fine Brothers. It is executive produced by Benny Fine, Rafi Fine, Max Benator, Todd Lieberman, David Hoberman, Laurie Zaks, Barry Safchik, and Michael Platt, and produced by Mandeville Films, Potvin Sucks Productions, and Fine Brothers Entertainment. The pilot premiered on April 21, 2016, during the Tribeca Film Festival. The show premiered on May 25, 2016, on YouTube Red, a paid service of streaming original series and films. It stars Mircea Monroe, Mark Sullivan, Debby Ryan, Preston Jones, Alex Désert, Todrick Hall, Missi Pyle and Ace Young. On December 3, 2017, creator Benny Fine confirmed on his Twitter account the series would not return for a second season.

=== Other YouTube series ===
==== Spoilers ====
FBE had a popular series where they spoil a variety of topics ranging from books to films to video games. The first episode of their Spoiler series, 100 Movie Spoilers in 5 Minutes – (Movie Endings Ruined) was uploaded on YouTube on November 11, 2008. FBE also uploaded a video containing spoilers of the first seven Harry Potter films in roughly seven minutes on July 13, 2011. In six minutes, FBE spoiled 47 years of the popular series, Doctor Who, and released subsequent sequels to prepare for the premieres of series eight and nine. Other TV shows that have had spoiler videos made about them include Game of Thrones, Breaking Bad, The Walking Dead and Orange Is the New Black. FBE put up a video each month spoiling 50 viral videos that had circulated on YouTube and other sources during the previous month.

==== Lost: What Will Happen Next? ====
FBE created a show titled Lost: What Will Happen Next?, a parody show based on the TV series Lost. The show premiered on January 24, 2008, and was the first long-running series on the Fine Brothers channel. The show lasted 19 episodes and ended on November 1, 2010. The show features several characters from other fictional universes such as the Avatar and the Star Wars universe. FBE collaborated with Rhett and Link to create a parody song of Lost.

== Controversies ==
=== Trademark attempt and React World ===
On January 26, 2016, FBE announced they would license and trademark their existing React series and let creators create their own "React" content. In particular, FBE applied to trademark, among other terms, the word "react", which is used in the title of many other YouTube videos unrelated to FBE's YouTube channel. The announcement was met with a backlash from some of their viewers and fellow YouTube content creators, many of whom believed FBE was attempting to prohibit the creation of reaction videos by people unaffiliated with their channel. In response, the company promised they would "not be trying to take revenue from other types of reaction videos, and will not be copyright-striking". However, other YouTubers reported copyright-related takedowns of videos containing FBE footage. There were also reports that another YouTube channel had produced Seniors React videos just prior to FBE's Elders React series. The backlash led to a dramatic drop in subscribers, with upwards of 675,000 (Note: As of February 22, 2016. Not including positive subs counts.) accounts collectively unsubscribing from the React and FBE channels in protest as of February 22, 2016.

On February 1, 2016, FBE stated they had rescinded all React trademarks and trademark applications, discontinued the React World program, and released all previous Content ID claims. FBE removed their original React World announcement video, and their update video, which addressed the initial backlash.

=== Allegations of racial discrimination ===
In June 2020, former employees spoke out about their experiences working at FBE, which included allegations of racism by the company. In January 2021, Insider published a report, which contained allegations the company cultivated casual racism. One employee claimed she was told at times to have a reactor with lighter skin on the left of video thumbnails. Insider said that in 434 thumbnails that included one person of color and one white person, 238 of them (55%), had the white person on the left side. People interviewed for the article alleged white people were favored to appear in React videos.

== Filmography ==
Web
Year	Title
2008–2010	Lost: What Will Happen Next?
2008–2017	Spoiler Alert!
2009	The Overthinker
2009	3-Way
2010–2017	Last Moments of Relationships
2010–2022	Kids React
2010–2011	Harry Potter and the Rejected Scenes
2010–2011	Lindsay Lohan Needs Real Friends
2011–present	Teens React
2012–2014	MyMusic
2012–2023	Elders React
2012–2021, 2023	YouTubers React
2013, 2016–2017	Emo Dad
2013–2016, 2018	Fine Time (originally Update Vlog)
2014–2020, 2022, 2024	React: Gaming
2014–2015, 2017-2018, 2020	React: Let's Plays
2014–present	People vs. Food
2014–2016	React: Advice
2014–2019	React: Lyric Breakdown
2014–2015	React: Opinions
2014–2015	React Remix
2014–2016	Inappropriate Parents
2014	Underwater Movie Scenes
2014, 2016–present	Celebrities React
2015–present	React: Do They Know It?
2015–present	Adults React
2015–2018	Reverse Ratings
2016–2020, 2023	Staff React
2016, 2018–present	Try Not To
2016, 2018–present	Generations React
2016	Sing It!
2016	Sample School
2016	Quizzicle
2017–2019	Challenge Chalice
2017–present	Guess That
2017–2020	The 10s

Television
Year	Title
2014–2015	React To That
2015	Six Degrees of Everything

Film
Year	Title
2017	F the Prom

== Accolades ==
This is a list of awards, nominations, recognition and achievements received by the Fine Brothers during their career.

Year	Nominated work	Category	Award-giving body	Result	Ref.
2012	Kids React	Best Viral Video Series	39th Daytime Emmy Awards	Won	
2012	Kids React	Best Variety Web Series	Inaugural IAWTV Awards	Won	
2013	Kids React	Best Variety Series	2013 IAWTV Awards	Nominated	
2013	MyMusic	Best Interactive/Social Media Experience	2013 IAWTV Awards	Nominated	
2013	MyMusic	Best Supplemental Content	2013 IAWTV Awards	Nominated	
2013	Kids React	Best Non-Fiction or Reality Series	3rd Streamy Awards	Won	
2013	Themselves	Audience Choice for Personality of the Year	3rd Streamy Awards	Nominated	
2013	MyMusic	Audience Choice for Series of the Year	3rd Streamy Awards	Nominated	
2013	MyMusic	Best Direction	3rd Streamy Awards	Nominated	
2013	MyMusic	Best Comedy Series	3rd Streamy Awards	Nominated	
2013	MyMusic	Best Writing: Comedy	3rd Streamy Awards	Nominated	
2013	MyMusic	Best Editing	3rd Streamy Awards	Nominated	
2014	Kids React	Best Directing (Non-Fiction)	2014 IAWTV Awards	Nominated	
2014	Kids React	Best Variety Web Series	2014 IAWTV Awards	Won	
2014	MyMusic	Best Supplemental Content	2014 IAWTV Awards	Nominated	
2015	Teens React	Show of the Year	2015 Streamy Awards	Nominated	
2015	Kids React	Non-Fiction	2015 Streamy Awards	Nominated	
2015	Kids React	Kids and Family	2015 Streamy Awards	Nominated	
2016	Elders Gaming	Online Film and Video – Gaming (Channel)	2016 Webby Awards	Won	
2016	Kids React	Online Film and Video – Reality	2016 Webby Awards	Won	
2016	Fine Brothers Entertainment	Online Film and Video – Entertainment (Channel)	2016 Webby Awards	Nominated	
2016	Do They Know It?	Non-Fiction	2016 Streamy Awards	Nominated	
2016	Kids React (Daniel Seibert, Jordan Towles, Alyssa Salter, Cara Bomar, Luke Braun, Benny Fine, Rafi Fine)	Editing	2016 Streamy Awards	Nominated	
2016	Emo Dad	Animated	2016 Streamy Awards	Nominated	
2017	React	Show of the Year	2017 Streamy Awards	Nominated	
2017	React	Non-Fiction Series	2017 Streamy Awards	Nominated	
2017	Last Moments of Relationships	Immersive	2017 Streamy Awards	Nominated	
2017	React	Online Film and Video	2017 Webby Awards	Won	
2018	React	Show of the Year	2018 Streamy Awards	Nominated	
2018	Do They Know It?	Pop Culture	2018 Streamy Awards	Nominated	
2019	FBE	Digital Studio of the Year	2019 Digiday Video Awards	Nominated	
2019	Teens React to Texting and Driving (Distracted Driving) in collab with AT&T It Can Wait	Branded Award for Social Good Campaign	2019 Streamy Brand Awards	Won	
