= Margot Bingham =

American actress and singer-songwriter

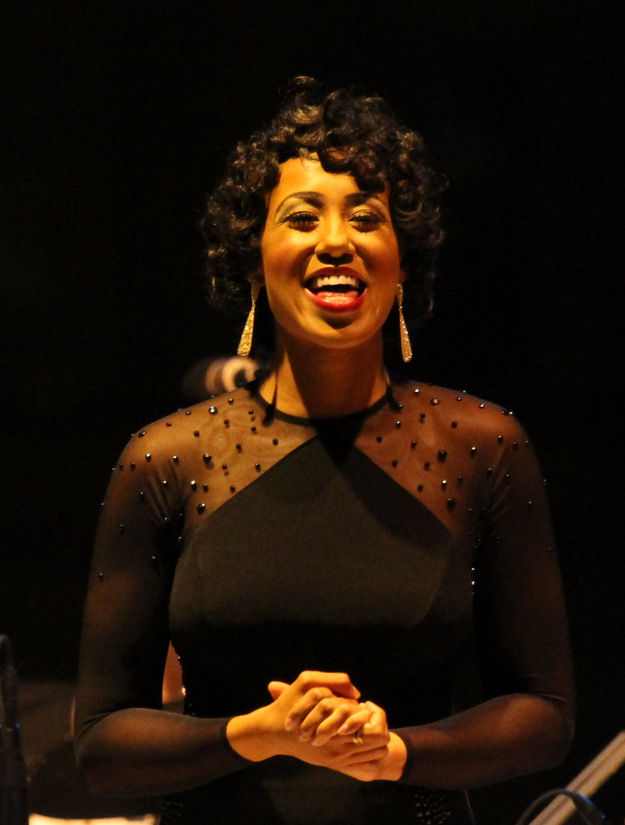
- Bingham performing in 2014
- Born: 1987 or 1988 (age 38–39); Pittsburgh, Pennsylvania, U.S.
- Occupations: Actress, singer
- Parent(s): Craig Bingham (father); Lynne Bingham (mother)
- Website: margotbingham.com

Margot Bingham (/ˈmɑːrɡoʊ ˈbɪŋəm/) is an American actress and singer-songwriter. She is best known for her role as jazz singer Daughter Maitland in the HBO period drama series, Boardwalk Empire. In 2015, Bingham began starring as one of lead characters in the ABC drama series, The Family. In 2021, she starred in the eleventh and final season of The Walking Dead.

== Life and career ==
Bingham was born in August 1988 and raised in the Green Tree suburb of Pittsburgh, Pennsylvania, the daughter of Craig Bingham, a former Pittsburgh Steelers linebacker, and Lynne Bingham. She graduated in 2006 from the Pittsburgh High School for the Creative and Performing Arts, and attended Point Park University for two years before relocating to New York City. She began appearing on stage there in 2010, and had a role in the 2011 revival of Rent. During that same time, she co-starred in the web series In Between Men, and performed in BAM Cafe at the Brooklyn Academy of Music.

In 2013, Bingham was cast in the recurring role of the 1920s jazz singer Daughter Maitland in the HBO period drama series, Boardwalk Empire, for which she received positive reviews from critics. In 2014, she had the recurring role in the short-lived El Rey Network series, Matador. In 2015, Bingham was cast as one of the female lead characters opposite Joan Allen in the ABC drama series, The Family created by Jenna Bans.

== Personal life ==
Bingham is of Jamaican descent on her father's side, and of German-Jewish and Russian-Jewish descent on her mother's side. Bingham is Jewish, and had a Bat Mitzvah ceremony.

== Filmography ==
=== Film ===
Year	Title	Role	Notes
2013	Burning Blue	Devon	
2014	Fugly!	Black Girl	
2015	Her Composition	Gila	
2015	Destined	Maya	
2016	Barbershop: The Next Cut	Bree	
2017	The Unattainable Story	Alma	
2017	Saturday Church	Amara	
2017	Anything	Brianna	
2018	A Vigilante	Joyce Richards	
2018	Then Came You	Lucy	

=== Television ===
Year	Title	Role	Notes
2010–2013	In Between Men	Kendra Sharpe	
2013	Golden Boy	Uniform	Episode: "Next Question"
2013–2014	Boardwalk Empire	Daughter Maitland	Recurring role, 11 episodes
2014	Matador	Billie	Recurring role, 6 episodes
2016	The Family	Sergeant Nina Meyer	Series regular
2017	Queen Sugar	Tamar Judith	
2017	She's Gotta Have It	Clorinda	Series regular
2017	Blue Bloods	Special Agent Maureen Bell	Episode: "Pain Killers..."
2018	The Marvelous Mrs. Maisel	Steiner Resort Band Singer	Uncredited, episode: “We’re Going to the Catskills!”
2018	One Dollar	Cass	Recurring role
2018–2023	New Amsterdam	Evie	Recurring role
2019–2022	The Walking Dead	"Stephanie" / Maxxine "Max" Mercer	Uncredited voice (S9), guest (S10), also starring (S11); 16 episodes
2023	Lawmen: Bass Reeves	Sara Jumper	
2025	Watson	Nurse Carlin DaCosta	
