= Sing It! =

- Genre: Situation comedy
- Created by: Benny Fine and Rafi Fine
- Directed by: Tyler Spindel
- Starring: Mircea Monroe; Mark Sullivan; Debby Ryan; Preston Jones; Alex Désert; Missi Pyle; Laura Harrison; Zack Weinstein
- Country of origin: United States
- No. of seasons: 1
- No. of episodes: 10

Production
- Executive producers: Benny Fine; Rafi Fine; Max Benator; Todd Lieberman; David Hoberman; Laurie Zaks; Barry Safchik; Michael Platt
- Camera setup: Single-camera
- Running time: 21–26 minutes
- Production companies: Mandeville Films; Potvin Sucks Productions; Fine Brothers Entertainment

Original release
- Network: YouTube Red
- Release: May 25 – July 6, 2016

Sing It! is an American situation comedy streaming television series created by Benny Fine and Rafi Fine. It is executive produced by Benny Fine, Rafi Fine, Max Benator, Todd Lieberman, David Hoberman, Laurie Zaks, Barry Safchik, and Michael Platt, and produced by Mandeville Films, Potvin Sucks Productions, and Fine Brothers Entertainment. The pilot had a premiere on April 21, 2016, during the Tribeca Film Festival. The show debuted on May 25, 2016, on YouTube Red, a paid service of streaming original series and movies, similar to Netflix. It stars Mircea Monroe, Mark Sullivan, Debby Ryan, Preston Jones, Alex Désert, Todrick Hall, Missi Pyle and Ace Young. On December 3, 2017, creator Benny Fine confirmed that the series would not return for a second season.

== Premise ==
The cast of Sing It!.

Stacey Needles (Mircea Monroe) is the underrated production assistant from Sing It!, a television music competition series. When the original executive producer was fired, she sees an opportunity to fill the position and be valued for their work. But her plan to take charge is thwarted with the arrival of newcomer indie production assistant, Drew (Mark Jude Sullivan). He is inexperienced, but creative and excited, stealing the attention of executives, becoming the potential future executive producer, which makes Needles try to overcome every day.

The program includes the sexy and charismatic presenter Troy Blue (Preston Jones) and the judges Holli Holiday (Debby Ryan), a famous and egocentric singer, who uses the program to self-promote, and Barry (Alex Désert), an artist manager and television producer, who is rarely impressed by a contestant. During the program, ten contestants was selected at the auditions to compete, where each week one of them was eliminated.

== Cast and characters ==
=== Main ===
- Mircea Monroe as Stacey Needles, a production assistant, who wants to be executive producer.
- Mark Jude Sullivan as Drew, the new production assistant, who becomes a potential future executive producer.
- Debby Ryan as Holli Holiday, one of the judges. A famous and egocentric singer, who uses the program to self-promote.
- Preston Jones as Troy Blue, the seductive and charismatic presenter of Sing It!.
- Alex Désert as Barry, one of the judges. An artist manager and television producer, who is rarely impressed by a contestant.
- Missi Pyle as Marcy
- Laura Harrison as Kali, Stacey's assistant
- Zack Weinstein as Luke, Drew's assistant

=== Recurring ===
- Ace Young as Darrell Docket, a contestant and Darcy's husband.
- Diana DeGarmo as Darcy Docket, a country contestant and Darrell's wife.
- Leah Lewis as Sophie Chu, a contestant
- Diamond White as Maisy Kelly, a contestant.
- J.D. Phillips as Freddy Traymont, a contestant
- Lily Mae Harrington as Adeline Murphy, a contestant
- Drew James as Zack Tribbet, a contestant
- Maxwell Glick as Shimon Rabinowitz, a contestant
- Shoniqua Shandai as Crystal Carl, a contestant
- Sam Tsui as Magnus Erikson, a contestant
- Scott Rodgers as a Technical Director
- Karl T. Wright as Jon Kelly, Maisy's father
- Janna Cardia as Catherine Kelly, Maisy's mother

=== Guest ===
- Sasha Pieterse as Destiny Wood, Holli's old friend
- Todrick Hall as Milo, a record producer
- Yanic Truesdale as Beau Hemsworth, the president of the network

== Episodes ==
No.	Title	Written by	Original release date
1	"The Show Begins!"	Benny Fine and Rafi Fine	May 25, 2016
2	"The Chicken Theory!"	Alex Jenkins Reid	May 25, 2016
3	"Stripped Down!"	Lauren Bachelis	May 25, 2016
4	"Coming Out?!"	Allen Zipper	May 25, 2016
5	"We Have to Sing What?!"	Joanna Lewis and Kristine Songco	June 1, 2016
6	"Destiny is Calling!"	Nick Cron-Devico	June 8, 2016
7	"Let's Sell Out!"	Joanna Lewis and Kristine Songco	June 15, 2016
8	"Let's be Real!"	Alex Jenkins Reid	June 22, 2016
9	"Final Four!"	Lauren Bachelis	June 29, 2016
10	"And the Winner is..."	Barry Safchik and Michael Platt	July 6, 2016

== Production ==
In October 2015, Fine Brothers announced a partnership with YouTube Red, a new paid service of streaming original series and movies, similar to Netflix. They started to work on a new comedy series, satirizing the talent shows. The show was inspired by television music competitions The X Factor, The Voice and American Idol. In November, Debby Ryan, Preston Jones, Alex Désert and Todrick Hall were confirmed in the cast. In a partnership with the production company Mandeville Films, the series began to be recorded in December. The character Holli Holiday, played by Debby Ryan, was inspired by Paula Abdul and Randy, played by Alex Désert, inspired by Simon Cowell. A teaser was released on April 13, 2016.

== Reception ==
Emily Ashby of Common Sense Media gave Sing It! 3 out of 5 stars.
