= Six Degrees of Everything =

- Six Degrees of Everything promo poster
- Genre: Comedy
- Directed by: Tom Stern
- Creative director: Koon Bunaak
- Presented by: Fine Brothers
- Narrated by: Joe Bereta
- Country of origin: United States
- Original language: English
- No. of seasons: 1
- No. of episodes: 10

Production
- Executive producers: Marc Summers; Max Benator; Amy Muratore; Josh Silberman; Tony Colon; Brandie Tucker; Benny Fine; Rafi Fine
- Producer: Oren Brimer
- Cinematography: Robert Vroom; Justin Morrison
- Editors: Kelly McGillicuddy; Thom Newell; Dashiell Reinhardt
- Running time: 30 minutes
- Production companies: Fine Brothers Entertainment; Marc Summers Productions

Original release
- Network: TruTV
- Release: August 18 – October 20, 2015

Six Degrees of Everything is a 30-minute American comedy reality show developed by Fine Brothers Entertainment & Marc Summers Productions for TruTV, and starring the Fine Brothers as the series hosts. The program debuted August 18, 2015 on TruTV.

== Background ==
On January 22, 2015, it was revealed that Turner-owned cable network TruTV picked up 10 half-hour episodes of the show titled Six Degrees of Everything, as a series combining sketch comedy, man on the street interviews, and reality segments supported by original songs and music. The series debut was aired on August 18, 2015, with episode 1.1 entitled "Einstein to Breast Implants", in which the Fine Brothers show how Albert Einstein connects with breast implants within six degrees of separation.

== Plot ==
The Fine Brothers host comedy segments to illustrate how anything in the world can be connected by six degrees.

== Cast ==
- Fine Brothers as themselves
- Joe Bereta as narrator
- Sara Fletcher as reporter
- Michael Q. Schmidt as Ben Franklin
- Emcee N.I.C.E. as Superman

=== Episodes ===
No. in season	Title	Original release date
1	"Einstein to Breast Implants"	August 18, 2015
Fine Brothers make connections sharing connecting Albert Einstein to breast implants. Along the way, Benny and Rafi share that Einstein's brain was stolen after death.
2	"Neanderthals to Smartphones"	August 25, 2015
Fine Brothers make connections sharing that Napoleon wasn't actually as short as we presume; and the computing power of a modern smartphone is greater than all of NASA's computers from 1969.
3	"Adam and Eve to the Atom Bomb"	September 1, 2015
Fine Brothers make connections sharing that Dr. Seuss was a nudist, inventor Ben Franklin had an obsession with alcohol, and Godzilla was a symbolic representation of the atom bomb.
4	"From Cannibals to Cannabis"	September 8, 2015
The Fine Brothers make connections between cannibals and cannabis, and trace through the drinking of blood and sword-swallowing.
5	"Girl Scouts to Game of Thrones"	September 15, 2015
The Fine Brothers connect Girl Scouts to Game of Thrones, while making the connection, they share that rice was used as mortar in the Great Wall of China, Fidel Castro was the subject of over 600 assassination attempts, and that in 2012, there were 21 babies named Daenerys in honor of the Mother of Dragons.
6	"Shakespeare to the Harlem Shake"	September 22, 2015
The Fine Brothers connect Shakespeare to the Harlem Shake, while doing so, they discover 25 of Uranus's moons were named after Shakespeare's plays, the world's most expensive beauty pageant crown is made of $1,000,000 in diamonds and the world's largest Harlem Shake had over 70,000 participants.
7	"Pyramid of Giza to Personal Pizza"	September 29, 2015
The Fine Brothers connect the Pyramids of Giza to the personal pizza. While doing so, they discover that jazz can have health benefits, female penguins use prostitution to make better nests, a teenager traded an old cell phone for a Porsche Boxster on craigslist, and that Sweden puts bananas and curry on their pizzas.
8	"Hamburgers to Hard Drives"	October 6, 2015
The Fine Brothers connect hamburgers to hard drives. While doing so, they discover that the mongols tenderized meat under their saddles, Genghis Khan has 16 million living descendants today, John Wilkes Booth's assistant was a eunuch, and the company that made the Winchester Rifle also invented the earliest hard drives.
9	"Hitler to Hip-Hop"	October 13, 2015
The Fine Brothers connect Adolf Hitler to hip-hop.
10	"Mother Teresa to Machine Guns"	October 20, 2015
The Fine Brothers connect Mother Teresa to machine guns tracing through demonic possession and exorcism, to the intelligence of pigs, to ancient Macedonia and Alexander the Great, to coffee and computer nerds and a gun called the Agar Coffee Mill to finally arrive at machine guns.

== Critical response ==
Finny McCloud of "The World of TV & Film" said,"Benny & Rafi really express the rather unknown connections between objects in our world like how they found a connection between Edgar Allan Poe and the Hot Air Balloon."

After previewing the series' very first episode, Tom Conroy of Medialife Magazine concluded that although the "rules of TruTV’s Six Degrees of Everything are infinitely stretchable", the Fine Brothers' stretches "are strained and silly." And in speaking only toward that first episode, decided that while the comedy shtick would be okay if in a shorter format, it overwhelms a 30-minute segment.
