= Shotgun Wedding (2022 film) =

2022 film by Jason Moore

- Release poster
- Directed by: Jason Moore
- Written by: Mark Hammer
- Produced by: Todd Lieberman; David Hoberman; Alexander Young; Jennifer Lopez; Elaine Goldsmith-Thomas; Benny Medina
- Starring: Jennifer Lopez; Josh Duhamel; Jennifer Coolidge; Sônia Braga; Cheech Marin; Callie Hernandez; Desmin Borges; D'Arcy Carden; Lenny Kravitz
- Cinematography: Peter Deming
- Edited by: Doc Crotzer
- Music by: Pinar Toprak
- Production companies: Summit Entertainment; Mandeville Films; Nuyorican Productions; Maximum Effort
- Distributed by: Amazon Studios; Lionsgate
- Release dates: December 28, 2022 (Asia-Pacific); January 27, 2023 (Prime Video)
- Running time: 100 minutes
- Country: United States
- Language: English
- Box office: $8.3 million

Shotgun Wedding is a 2022 American romantic action comedy film directed by Jason Moore and written by Mark Hammer. It stars Jennifer Lopez, Josh Duhamel, Sônia Braga, Jennifer Coolidge, Lenny Kravitz, and Cheech Marin.

After being filmed from February to April 2021 in Boston and the Dominican Republic, Shotgun Wedding was released in Singapore on December 28, 2022, and was released on January 27, 2023, by Amazon Studios via Prime Video.

== Plot ==
Tom, Darcy and their families gather for an ultimate destination wedding on a private island in the Philippines. Just as the couple are taking a private moment to argue about the wedding, their guests are taken hostage. The pirates demand $45 million from Darcy's wealthy father Robert. He refuses to pay until he has proof that Darcy is alive.

Darcy and Tom are captured apart from the wedding party, but manage to escape their captors, killing four of the pirates. As they try to evade recapture, Darcy and Tom air their respective doubts about the wedding. Cornered hiding in a vault beneath the manager's office, Tom surrenders to them so Darcy can stay hidden.

When he rejoins the rest of the wedding party, Tom reveals that Darcy's ex-fiancé Sean had hired the pirates. With his plot exposed, Sean goes to hunt down Darcy, taking Robert's girlfriend Harriet as a hostage. Meanwhile, Darcy joins Tom and the rest at the pool where she and Tom admit that they still want to marry.

The wedding party members realize that Harriet was in on the plot with Sean. Tom asks the two pirates standing guard to let them complete the wedding ceremony, and Robert says that he will release the money if they let them get married. As the guests sing "I'll Be", Tom and Darcy rush the pirates, and Darcy takes a grenade off one. One pirate surrenders; the other runs, then begins firing on the venue. Tom's mother Carol grabs a weapon from the ground and returns fire. Darcy throws the grenade in the air so Tom can bat it at the pirate, who is killed in the explosion (which also sets off the fireworks that had been staged for the wedding celebration).

As the wedding party goes to safety, Darcy and Tom race to get help, but are confronted on the dock by Sean. Tom fights him, then Tom and Darcy escape in a boat. Harriet tries to stop them in a helicopter. Sean, who had managed to stay with them by grabbing a mooring line, climbs aboard and fights Tom again while Darcy drives the boat.

A parasail is released, taking Tom and Sean into the air. Tom zips down the line to the boat deck. He and Darcy cut the line, sending the parasail loose into the helicopter's rotors, which kills both Sean and Harriet.

Back on the beach, as authorities take the remaining pirates into custody, Tom and Darcy get married.

== Cast ==
- Jennifer Lopez as Darcy Rivera, Tom's fiancée
- Josh Duhamel as Tom Fowler, Darcy's fiancé
- Jennifer Coolidge as Carol Elaine Fowler, Tom and Jeannie's mother
- Sônia Braga as Renata Ortiz, Darcy and Jamie's mother
- Cheech Marin as Robert Rivera, Darcy and Jamie's father
- Callie Hernandez as Jamie Rivera, Darcy's sister
- Desmin Borges as Ricky Silver, Tom's friend
- D'Arcy Carden as Harriet, Robert's girlfriend
- Lenny Kravitz as Sean Hawkins, Darcy's ex-fiancé
- Steve Coulter as Larry Fowler, Tom and Jeannie's father
- Melissa Hunter as Jeannie Fowler, Tom's sister
- Alberto Isaac as Ace
- Selena Tan as Margy

== Production ==
=== Development ===
The film was first announced on January 29, 2019, with Ryan Reynolds attached to star, Pitch Perfect's Jason Moore directing and Mark Hammer writing the screenplay alongside Liz Meriwether. Todd Lieberman and David Hoberman of Mandeville Films would produce the film alongside Reynolds through his production company Maximum Effort. Lopez, Elaine Goldsmith-Thomas, and Benny Medina joined as producers of the film through Nuyorican Productions in October 2020.

=== Casting ===
On October 27, 2020, Jennifer Lopez was cast as the female lead. Armie Hammer replaced Reynolds (who eventually served as executive producer for the film) as the male lead in the film before dropping out in January 2021 in the wake of abuse allegations against him.

On January 19, 2021, Josh Duhamel entered early negotiations to replace Hammer, with his casting confirmed the following month. Sônia Braga and Jennifer Coolidge were also cast in starring roles. On February 16, 2021, Lenny Kravitz, Cheech Marin, D'Arcy Carden, Selena Tan, Desmin Borges, and Alex Mallari Jr. were cast. On May 7, 2021, Callie Hernandez and Steve Coulter joined the cast of the film.

=== Filming ===
Filming was originally planned to commence in the summer of 2019, but was later rescheduled to February 22, 2021, with shooting taking place in Boston and the Dominican Republic. Lopez announced on Instagram that principal photography had officially wrapped on April 22, 2021.

== Release ==
The film was originally scheduled to be released theatrically by Lionsgate on June 29, 2022. In March 2022, Amazon Studios acquired the rights to the film for a streaming release on Prime Video, released on January 26, 2023. Lionsgate retained international theatrical rights for the film due to American regulations on theatrical policy. It was released in Singapore (via Encore Films), and was released on the streaming service on January 27, 2023.

According to Nielsen Media Research, Amazon Prime Video saw the largest monthly usage increase in January, recording a 9.3% uptick in viewing (+0.2 share pts.) that was driven by its original series, Jack Ryan, and original movie, Shotgun Wedding.

== Reception ==
=== Critical response ===
On the review aggregator website Rotten Tomatoes, 44% of 115 critics' reviews are positive, with an average rating of 5.1/10. The website's consensus reads: "Shotgun Wedding may be just the invitation to escapism that romcom fans and JLo completists are looking for—but most other viewers can safely RSVP no without regrets." Metacritic, which uses a weighted average, assigned the film a score of 46 out of 100, based on 28 critics, indicating "mixed or average" reviews.

=== Box office ===
Though it was not released to theatres in the United States and Canada, Shotgun Wedding was released in international markets, where it grossed $8.3 million at the box office.
