= Ben Hoberman =

American radio executive (1922–2014)

- Born: Ben Hoberman; July 21, 1922; Chisholm, Minnesota
- Died: May 3, 2014 (age 92)
- Citizenship: United States
- Spouse: Jacklyn Kanter
- Children: 3 including David Hoberman

Bernard Gilbert "Ben" Hoberman (July 21, 1922 – May 3, 2014) was an American radio executive credited with pioneering the all-talk format by launching it at KABC (AM) in Los Angeles, California in 1960.

== Biography ==
Hoberman was born to a Jewish family in Chisholm, Minnesota. His first job in radio was as an announcer at a station in Hibbing, Minnesota when he was 18. In 1942, he enlisted in the United States Army and was assigned to the Armed Forces Network in Europe. After the war, he worked as general manager at several stations in the Midweast, including a stint as station manager of WDET-FM in Detroit, a public service station owned by the United Auto Workers, before becoming general manager of WABC radio in New York City.

In 1960, he took over as general manager of KABC radio in Los Angeles and originated the all-talk format. The format was highly successful and would spread throughout the United States in the 1970s.

In 1979, Hoberman left KABC to become president of ABC Radio in New York. He supervised six satellite networks, twelve AM and FM stations, and syndicated programs, such as Casey Kasem's American Top 40. He later joined former ABC president Elton Rule and others in an unsuccessful attempt to gather enough money for a takeover of the ABC Radio division. In 2003, he was named to the Broadcasting & Cable Hall of Fame.

== Death ==
Hoberman died of lung cancer in Los Angeles, California on May 3, 2014, aged 91, and was survived by his sons, producer David Hoberman and entertainment lawyer Tom Hoberman, as well as a daughter and five grandchildren. His wife of 65 years, Jacklyn (née Kanter), died in April 2013.
