= Chip 'n Dale: Rescue Rangers (film) =

2022 film by Akiva Schaffer

- Official release poster
- Directed by: Akiva Schaffer
- Written by: Dan Gregor; Doug Mand
- Based on: Chip 'n Dale: Rescue Rangers by; Tad Stones; Alan Zaslove; Chip 'n' Dale by Bill Justice
- Produced by: David Hoberman; Todd Lieberman
- Starring: John Mulaney; Andy Samberg; KiKi Layne
- Cinematography: Larry Fong
- Edited by: Brian Olds
- Music by: Brian Tyler; Mark Mueller (Theme Song)
- Production companies: Walt Disney Pictures; Mandeville Films
- Distributed by: Walt Disney Studios Motion Pictures
- Release dates: May 16, 2022 (El Capitan Theatre); May 20, 2022 (Disney+, United States)
- Running time: 97 minutes
- Country: United States
- Language: English
- Budget: ~$70 million (Note: Schaffer said "our budget was around the same as Roger Rabbit" and called that "the most expensive film of all time" at the time of its release, meaning he had to have been citing the reported $70 million figure, not the later-revealed $50.6 million number.)
- Box office: $623,190 (Note: This number reflects the theatrical release in Russia and CIS only. In all other territories, the film was released direct-to-streaming.)

Chip 'n Dale: Rescue Rangers is a 2022 American live-action/animated action-adventure comedy film based on the characters Chip 'n' Dale, and is a follow-up to the 1989 animated TV series of the same name. Concieved as a spiritual successor to the 1988 film Who Framed Roger Rabbit, the film was directed by Akiva Schaffer and written by the writing team of Dan Gregor and Doug Mand, and stars John Mulaney and Andy Samberg as the voices of the respective eponymous pair, alongside Will Arnett, Eric Bana, Flula Borg, Dennis Haysbert, Keegan-Michael Key, Seth Rogen, Tress MacNeille (reprising her role from the series), Tim Robinson, J. K. Simmons, and KiKi Layne co-starring in supporting roles, with the latter in a live-action role.

Produced by Walt Disney Pictures in association with The Lonely Island (Schaffer and Samberg are two of the members of the group) and David Hoberman and Todd Lieberman's Mandeville Films, the film is set 30 years after their original show got cancelled due to a falling-out, and takes place in an alternate world where fictional and cartoon characters live alongside real humans. In the film, Chip and Dale attempt to reconcile their differences while investigating the mysterious trafficking of cartoons and the kidnapping of their friend and co-star Monterey Jack.

Chip 'n Dale: Rescue Rangers premiered at the El Capitan Theatre in Hollywood, California on May 16, 2022, and was released in the United States on May 20, streaming on Disney+ as an original film. It received positive reviews from critics, and won the award for Outstanding Television Movie at the 74th Primetime Emmy Awards.

== Plot ==
In a world co-populated by real humans and fictional characters (Note: while not explicitly stated, the film was written to take place in the same human-toon universe as Who Framed Roger Rabbit), two chipmunks named Chip and Dale meet in elementary school and become best friends. They later relocated to Hollywood and, after casting as extras in commercials and shows, went on to star in the successful television series Chip 'n Dale: Rescue Rangers in the early 1990s. However, when Dale gets his own show, Double-O-Dale, a heated argument breaks out, causing them to accidentally fall out, which leads to both shows' cancellation.

Thirty years later, Chip is a successful but disillusioned insurance salesman while Dale spends most of his time on the fan convention circuit, having been put through CGI surgery. One night, the two are contacted by their former Rescue Rangers co-star Monterey Jack, who owes money to the criminal Valley Gang due to his stinky cheese addiction. Monty warns the pair of a trafficking operation where toons are abducted, have their appearances altered, and are shipped overseas to produce bootlegs of their works for the rest of their lives. Later that night, the two are informed that Monty has been kidnapped. They meet Police Captain Putty and Officer Ellie Steckler; the latter reveals herself to be a big Rescue Rangers fan, and with the police's hands tied, she suggests Chip and Dale investigate on their own.

Chip and Dale visit Bjornson the Cheesemonger, Monty's cheese dealer, and ask about the Valley Gang. They are taken to the uncanny valley part of town and meet the gang's head, Sweet Pete, a toon actor who played Peter Pan, now an adult, and his henchmen Bob and Jimmy. Thinking they are investigating his bootlegging business, Pete tries to capture the pair, but the chipmunks escape. The two later share their discoveries with Ellie, learning that she is shunned by Putty due to acting on a bad tip and raiding the Nick Jr. Channel studios with negative results.

With Ellie's help, the chipmunks sneak into a bathhouse to steal Pete's fitness tracker. They trace his movements to a dock warehouse, though it is already abandoned by the time the police arrive. Inside, they find a large operating machine designed to alter toons' bodies, along with several toon parts, including Monty's mustache.

At the police station, the pair argue over the loss of Monty and their past feud but smell the scent of Monty's cologne. Realizing either Putty or Ellie is working with Sweet Pete, the two flee the station. At the ongoing Fan Con, they try to convince Ugly Sonic to ask his FBI contacts for help, but Pete and his henchmen arrive, having tracked Dale using his social media posts. In the ongoing chase, Bob is restrained and arrested, but Chip is caught by Jimmy and taken to the warehouse. Ellie is also lured there by Putty, revealing he is part of the Valley Gang and has been covering for Pete, including giving Ellie the false Nick Jr. tip while Dale regrets getting Double-O-Dale in the first place.

Sweet Pete has Ellie call Dale to lure him to the warehouse, but Ellie sends a coded message using a Rescue Rangers episode. Dale realizes Ellie is in trouble and contacts former Rescue Rangers co-stars Gadget Hackwrench and Zipper, now married with children, for help. Dale enters the warehouse using a firework, which gets lodged into the machine and stops it before it can be used on Chip. The machine goes haywire, transforming Jimmy into a fairy and Pete into a giant amalgamation of various toons. While Ellie fights and defeats Putty, Pete chases Chip and Dale through the warehouse, revealing it to also be where the bootlegs are filmed. The chipmunks lure Pete to the docks and use a ploy from a Rescue Rangers episode to trap him.

The FBI, led by Ugly Sonic, arrives to arrest Sweet Pete and the Valley Gang. Sweet Pete fires a cannonball at Chip, but Dale takes the hit. Chip fears Dale is dead and apologizes for his behavior over the years, but Dale reveals he was protected by a golden pog Chip gave him. The chipmunks free all the bootlegged toons, including Monty, and Dale introduces the Rescue Rangers to Ellie, who decides to open her own detective agency, while Sweet Pete and the Valley Gang are arrested for their crimes. As the team departs, Dale convinces them to film a Chip 'n Dale: Rescue Rangers reboot, which is released to great success.

== Cast ==
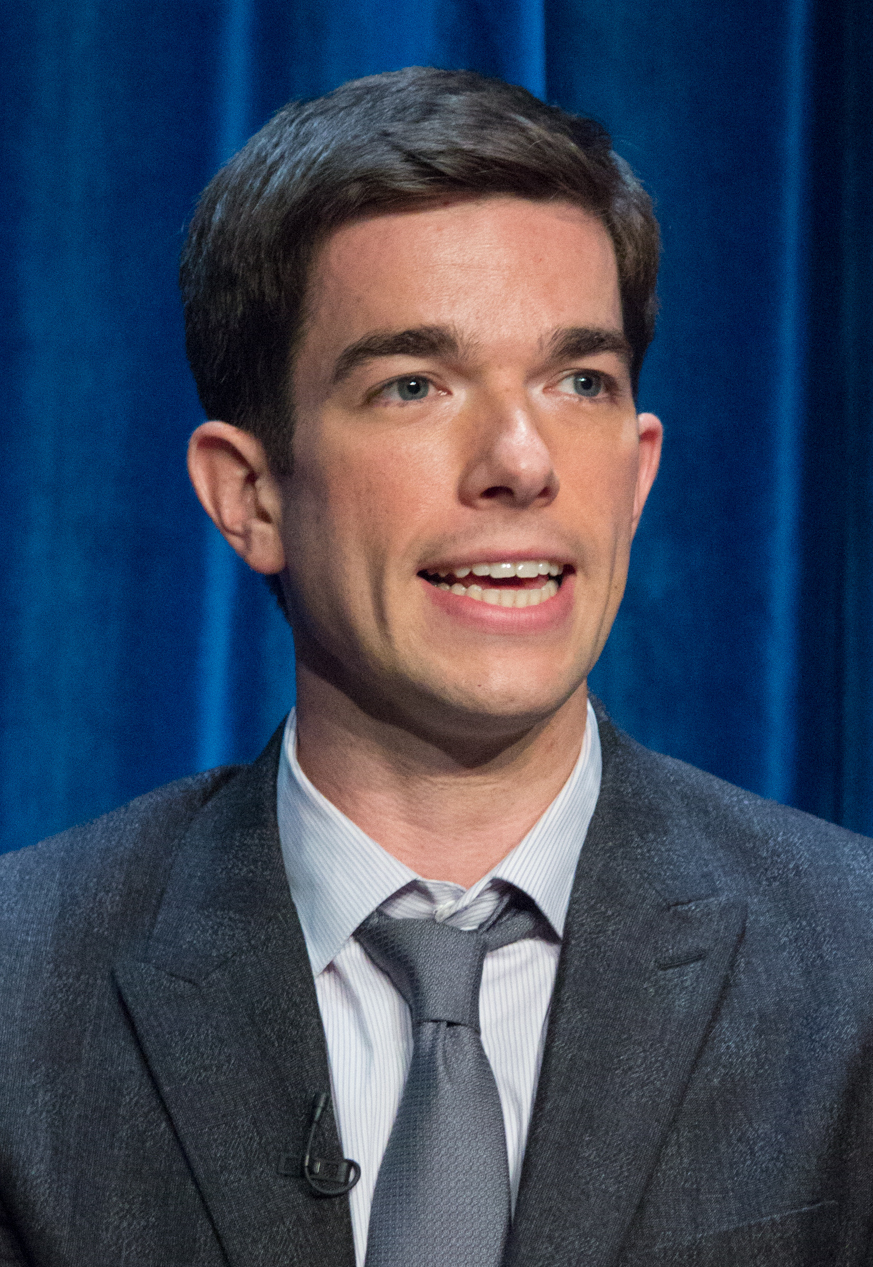
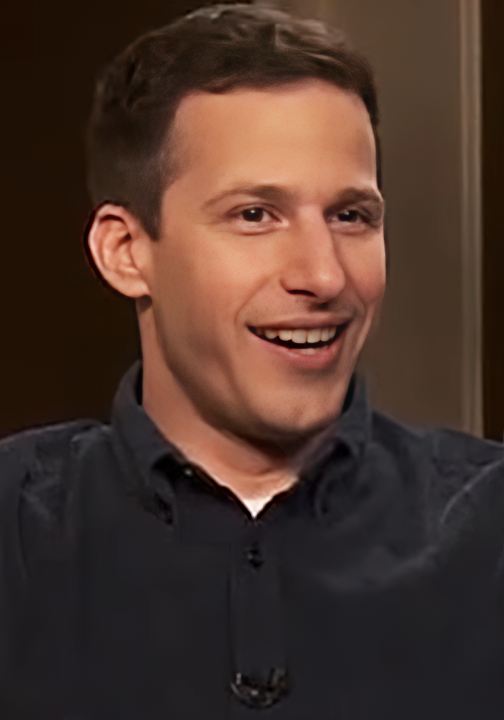
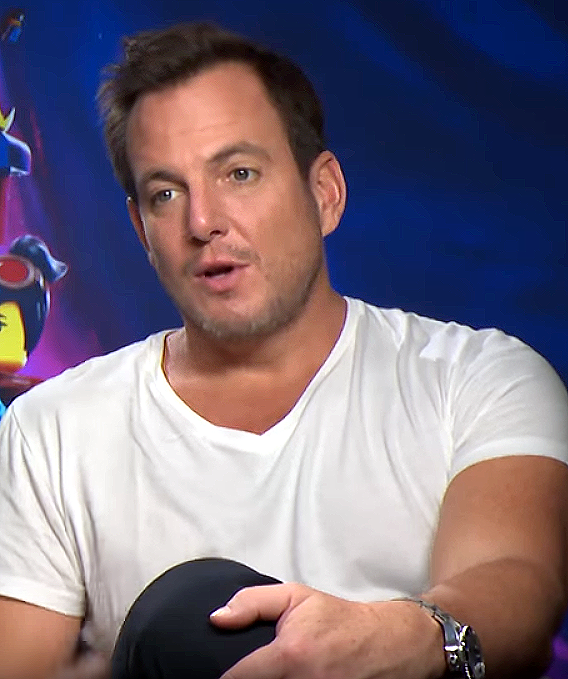
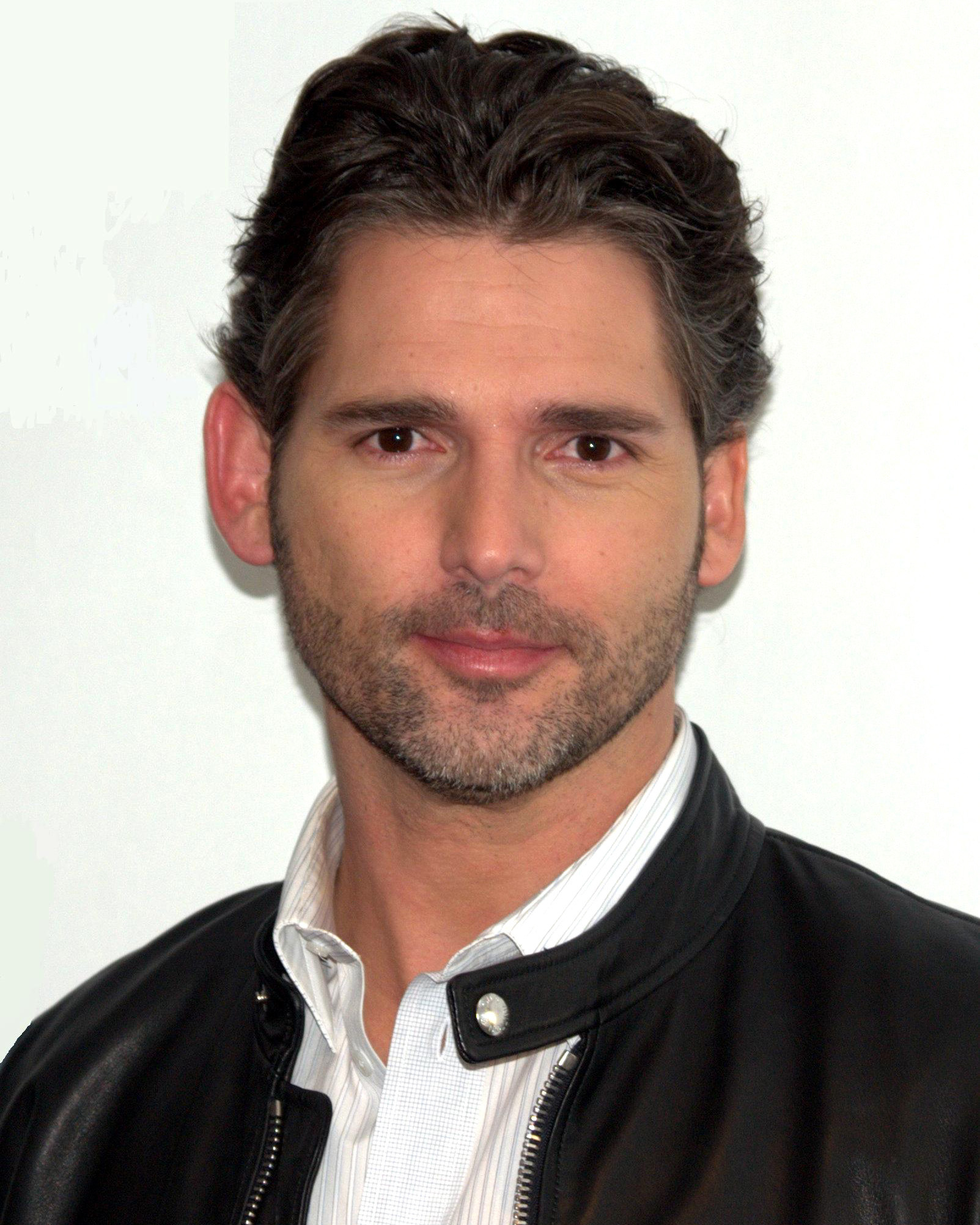
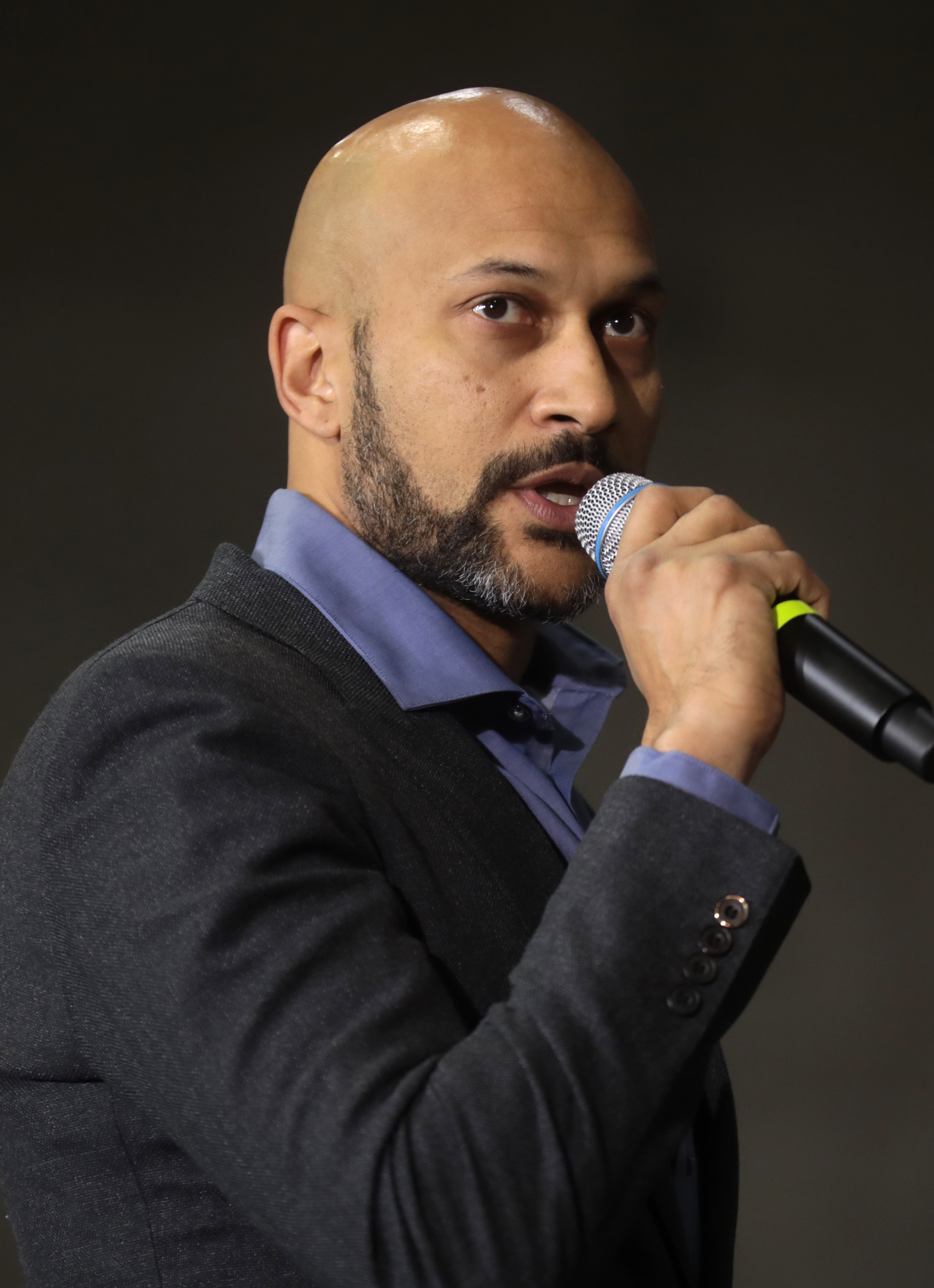
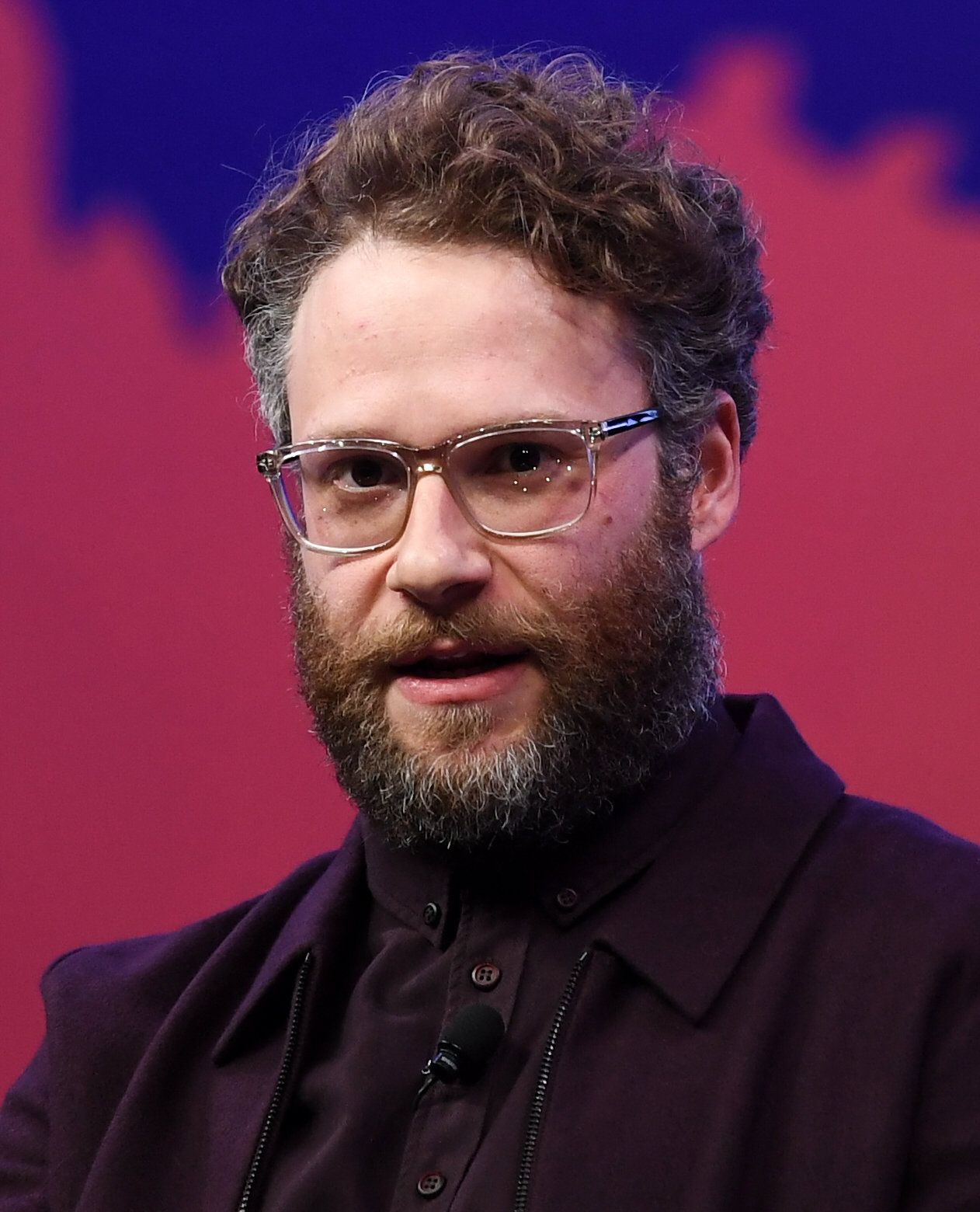
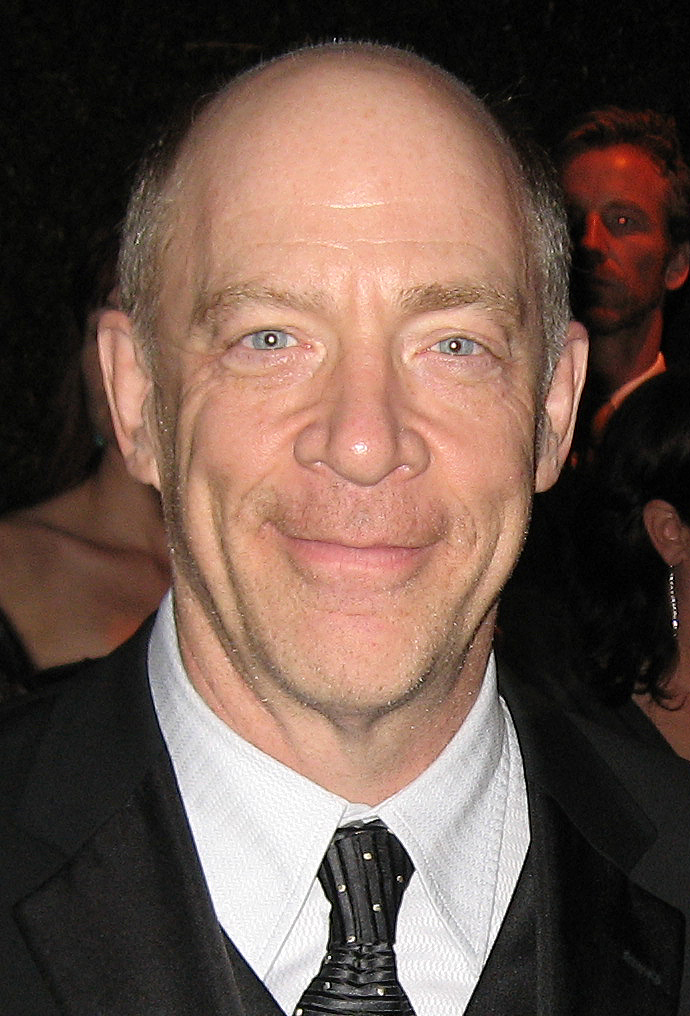
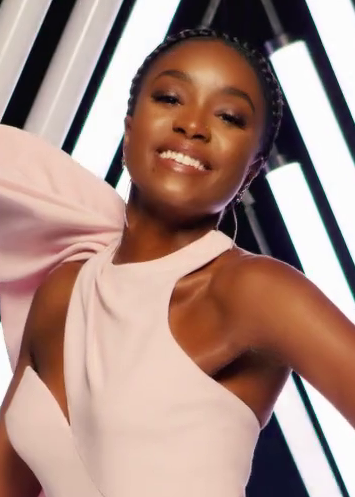
Left to right:
Top row: John Mulaney and Andy Samberg voice Chip and Dale respectively, while Will Arnett and Eric Bana voice Sweet Pete and Monterey Jack.
Bottom row: Keegan-Michael Key, Seth Rogen, J.K. Simmons and KiKi Layne respectively play the roles of Bjornson the Cheesemonger, Bob, Captain Putty and Ellie Steckler..
- John Mulaney as the voice of Chip, a chipmunk and the once-heroic, intelligent, unflappable leader and co-founder of the Rescue Rangers who upheld a strong moral standard and now works as a risk-averse and bitter insurance salesman. Tress MacNeille briefly provides the voice acting for Chip's chipmunk voice (credited as "high-pitch Chip"), reprising her role from the original series. Mason Blomberg voices Chip as a child during the film's prologue.
- Andy Samberg as the voice of Dale, a chipmunk and Chip's fun-loving former best friend and co-founder of the Rescue Rangers, who possesses an impulsive mindset and now makes a living with fan convention appearances. Dale's present-day appearance is depicted with photorealistic computer-animation, unlike the cel-shaded animation of his former teammates; this was explained in-universe as "getting CGI surgery," an equivalent to plastic surgery. Corey Burton briefly provides the voice acting for Dale's chipmunk voice (credited as "high-pitch Dale"), reprising his role from the original series. Juliet Donenfeld voices Dale as a child during the film's prologue.
- Will Arnett as the voice of Sweet Pete, the toon actor who played Peter Pan, being now a middle aged man with a Bobby Cannavale-esque voice who founded the Valley Gang after being fired due to his age. Archival recordings of Betty Lou Gerson as Cruella de Vil were used for the chimeric Sweet Pete's laughter.
- Eric Bana as the voice of Monterey Jack, a cheese-loving Australian mouse and a member of the Rescue Rangers. The character was originally voiced by Peter Cullen in season one of the original series and by Jim Cummings in season two of the original series.
- Flula Borg as the voice of DJ Herzogenaurach, a snake DJ who is a fan of Chip and Dale and encounters them in a bathhouse.
- Dennis Haysbert as the voice of Zipper, a housefly and member of the Rescue Rangers. He and Gadget eventually got married and had hybrid children after the show's cancellation while also speaking English. Corey Burton also provides Zipper's unintelligible buzzing sounds from the original series.
- Keegan-Michael Key as the voices of:
  - Bjornson the Cheesemonger, a CGI Swedish Chef-esque cheesemonger and member of the Valley Gang.
  - A frog co-worker of Chip.
- Tress MacNeille as the voice of Gadget Hackwrench, an inventive mouse and member of the Rescue Rangers. She and Zipper eventually got married and had hybrid kids after the show's cancellation. MacNeille reprises her role from the original series.
- Tim Robinson as the voice of Ugly Sonic, a version of Sonic the Hedgehog who appears in his scrapped original design from the 2020 feature film adaptation.
- Seth Rogen as the voices of:
  - Bob, a motion-capture Viking dwarf and member of the Valley Gang. Bob is loosely based on the motion-capture characters of various motion-capture films such as The Polar Express and Beowulf.
  - Pumbaa from the 2019 version of The Lion King
  - Master Mantis from the Kung Fu Panda franchise
  - B.O.B. from the Monsters vs. Aliens franchise.
- J. K. Simmons as Captain S. Putty, a Gumby-esque claymation police captain who is investigating the missing toon cases, but is later revealed to be part of the Valley Gang.
- KiKi Layne as Ellie Steckler, a rookie LAPD police officer and lifelong fangirl of the Rescue Rangers.

Additionally, Da'Vone McDonald voices Jimmy, a CGI polar bear and member of the Valley Gang. Director Akiva Schaffer alluded Jimmy's appearance to the Coca-Cola polar bear. Schaffer provides voices for numerous minor roles including E.T. from E.T. the Extra-Terrestrial (1982) and Mr. Natural while also appearing in live-action as the director of the original show. Rachel Bloom voices Flounder from the 1989 version of The Little Mermaid, Cubby of the Lost Boys from Peter Pan (1953), Chip's mom, and a bootleg Bart Simpson, among other characters. Liz Cackowski voices Tigra, who is modeled after her appearance in The Avengers: United They Stand, Officer O'Hara, and a cartoon cow who strongly resembles Clarabelle Cow. Despite not reprising Monterey Jack in the film, Jim Cummings reprises his roles as Fat Cat from the original series, the Shredder's "right arm" from the 2003 Teenage Mutant Ninja Turtles animated series, Pete, and Darkwing Duck, in addition to voicing bootleg versions of Winnie the Pooh and Tigger. Chris Parnell appears as Dave Bollinari, Dale's agent. Jeff Bennett voices Lumière from the 1991 version of Beauty and the Beast. Steven Curtis Chapman voices Baloo from the 2016 version of The Jungle Book who Jimmy meets. Jorma Taccone voices the DC Extended Universe version of Bruce Wayne / Batman along with other minor roles. Jean Gilpin voices Chip's neighbor Mrs. House. Alan Oppenheimer voices both He-Man and Skeletor (reprising his role as the latter) from the original He-Man and the Masters of the Universe. Charles Fleischer reprises his role as Roger Rabbit from Who Framed Roger Rabbit, as well as the character's first animated appearance since the 1993 short Trail Mix-Up. Original Rescue Rangers co-creator Tad Stones cameos as the voice of a studio executive. David Tennant reprises his role as Scrooge McDuck from the 2017 version of DuckTales. Paula Abdul appears as a de-aged version of herself, alongside MC Skat Kat from her video for "Opposites Attract", and also voices the 3-D reporter modeled after her. Paul Rudd appears in a live-action cameo as himself.

In the spirit of Who Framed Roger Rabbit, the film features numerous cameo appearances of other animated characters from within the Disney catalogue and other third-party properties that appear without dialogue:

- Among the Disney characters include the Three Little Pigs, the Magic Carpet from Aladdin (1992), the Colonel from One Hundred and One Dalmatians (1961), Linda Flynn-Fletcher from Phineas and Ferb, Doc McStuffins, Wynnchel and Duncan from Wreck-It Ralph, and Professor Norton Nimnul, Wart, and Mepps from the original series.
- Non-Disney characters include two of the Jellicle cats from the 2019 film adaptation of Andrew Lloyd Webber's musical Cats distributed by Universal Pictures, Blaster from The Transformers, several characters from My Little Pony: Friendship Is Magic (Hasbro), Randy Marsh from South Park, McGruff the Crime Dog, and Detective Florez from Big Mouth.

== Production ==
=== Development and pre-production ===
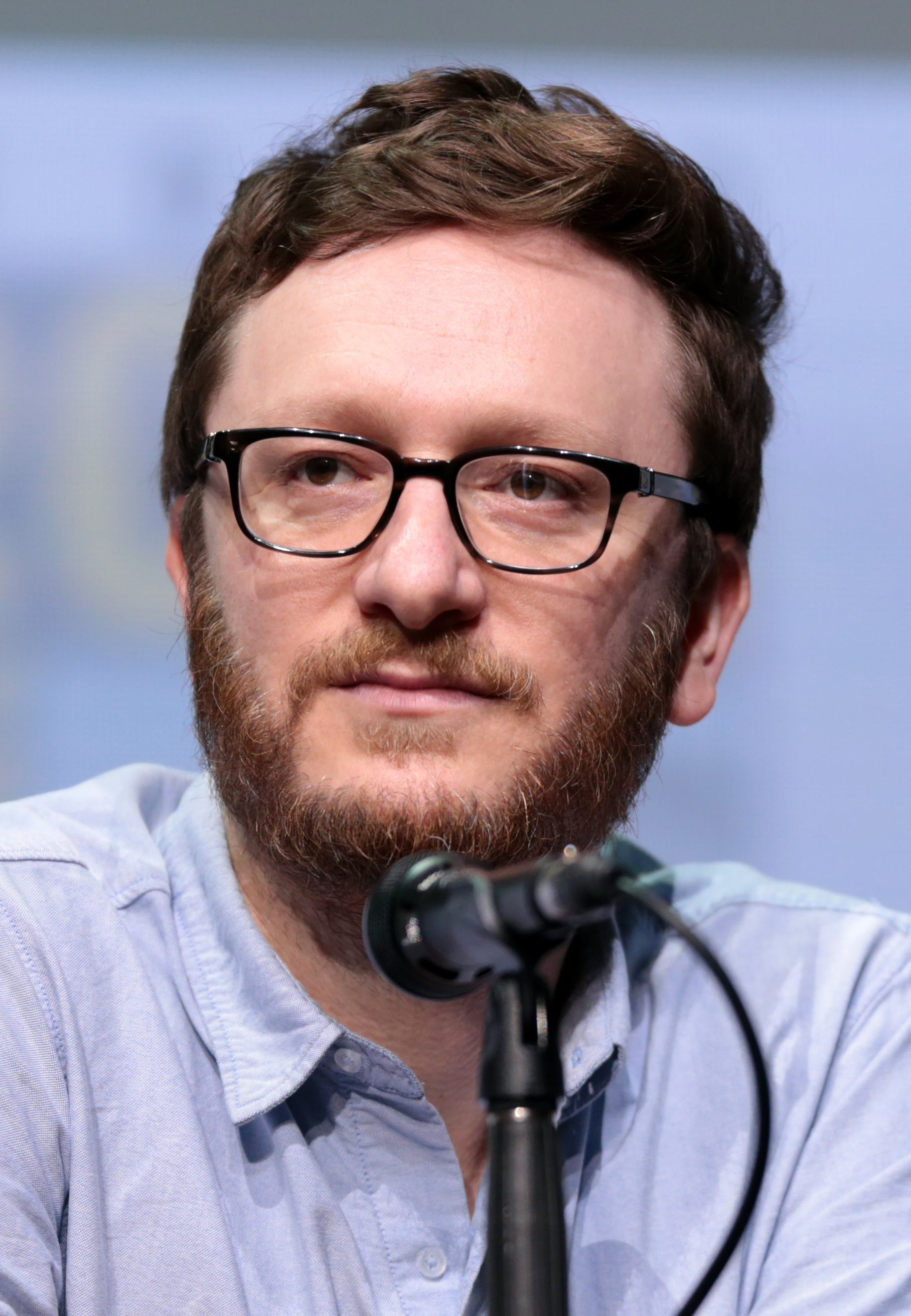
Akiva Schaffer, the film's director

On January 31, 2014, it was announced that The Walt Disney Company was developing a live-action movie based on the Disney Afternoon animated series Chip 'n Dale: Rescue Rangers with CGI special effects, similar to 20th Century Fox's Alvin & the Chipmunks film series. David Hoberman and Todd Lieberman signed on as its producers, while Robert Rugan was hired to write and direct the film. It would have followed an origin story for the Rescue Rangers. Robert Rugan debunked these claims, claiming that the project was a combination of live-action and animation, and was a direct film adaptation of the series with a slightly darker tone reminiscent to a 1940s noir film.

In May 2019, Akiva Schaffer, known for the 2007 cult classic Hot Rod, became the film's new director, replacing Rugan, while Dan Gregor and Doug Mand became its new writers and claimed that the film would follow a "meta, something self-referential and cool" take on the characters. David Hoberman and Todd Lieberman returned as its producers, and the project became a co-production between Walt Disney Pictures and Mandeville Films. Gregor and Mand had started the new script as a spiritual successor to Who Framed Roger Rabbit, taking into account the changes in animation techniques in the four decades since Roger Rabbit had been made. They wanted to keep what they felt made Roger Rabbit successful, being that the film "is not talking down to the animated characters [and] playing it real and to the top of your intelligence". Schaffer said they were further influenced by buddy cop films of the 1990s such as the Lethal Weapon series, while including more comedic elements.

Schaffer agreed to direct the film after he was sent Gregor and Mand's script; he agreed due to the film's self-referential humor, his love for both the original series and Roger Rabbit, and an interest in working on animated films. The film features cameo appearances from several non-Disney animated properties due to Schaffer wanting the film to be "a love letter celebration of animation", similar to Roger Rabbit, and felt including only Disney characters would instead make the film "just a celebration of Disney animation". Schaffer did not want to go overboard on such cameos, going by the rule "Don't put in a cameo unless it's forwarding the story or putting a button on a really good laugh". Schaffer used the example of the donut cops from Wreck-It Ralph, who not only served as recognizable characters for younger audiences, but also played on the popular concept of police officers loving to eat donuts as a joke for those that had not seen the film. Non-Disney companies authorized through Disney's legal team for their characters to appear in the film after Schaffer assured them it was "not going to make fun of their characters".

Schaffer said that for the film's villain, they wanted to play on the idea of child actors that were not able to continue acting as adults through cartoon characters. Early on, the team considered using an adult version of Charlie Brown from Peanuts for the role, but eventually selected Peter Pan for easier licensing. This was compared to Bobby Driscoll, the original voice actor for Peter Pan in the 1953 film. In the years following its release, Driscoll's acting career spiraled into decline after being terminated from Disney as he reached puberty. This affected his personal life, with Driscoll becoming addicted to drugs. In early 1968, Driscoll died as a result of heart failure from drug abuse. Several events from this point in Driscoll's life were applied similarly to Sweet Pete's backstory.

According to storyboard artist Simeon Wilkins, they had planned for Jar Jar Binks from Star Wars to feature in the convention hall scenes, but he was replaced with "Ugly Sonic". Other discarded appearances included actor Chris Evans, Elliot from Pete's Dragon, Sulley and Mike from Monsters, Inc., Tick-Tock the Crocodile from Peter Pan, Sabretooth from X-Men: The Animated Series, and Mushu from Mulan.

=== Casting ===
Though initial reports said that Corey Burton would return as the voice of Dale, it was announced in December 2020 that Andy Samberg would provide the voice for the character. John Mulaney as Chip was revealed in the same announcement and Seth Rogen was announced to be making a cameo in the film. Additional casting was announced with the release of the teaser trailer on February 15, 2022. In April 2022, during the release of a new trailer, it was confirmed that Burton would reprise Dale along with Tress MacNeille reprising Chip for brief dialogue.

=== Filming ===
Principal photography commenced on March 16, 2021, in Los Angeles with Larry Fong as cinematographer. Filming lasted 30–35 days.

=== Visual effects and animation ===
Both visual effects for the film and the Rescue Rangers' and Sweet Pete's animation were provided by Moving Picture Company (MPC). While there are numerous hand-drawn animated characters shown as minor roles, the crew decided for MPC to provide computer-animation for the Rescue Rangers and Sweet Pete, while giving them a cel-shaded look to appear hand-drawn, for time and budget. While MPC had also done the animation work for the Sonic the Hedgehog film, for Chip 'n Dale: Rescue Rangers they created an entirely new model of Ugly Sonic. For Roger Rabbit's cameo at the start of the film, one of the animators from Who Framed Roger Rabbit was brought to animate the character. Animation services were also provided by Passion Pictures. The ponies from My Little Pony: Friendship is Magic were done by Top Draw Animation, who animated them for the series and 2017 film. Schaffer said the animation budget was "an eighth of what like a Pixar or Disney Animation movie would be" and that it accounted for half the film's total cost.

=== Music ===
Brian Tyler is the film's composer and conductor and its theme song was written by pop songwriter Mark Mueller, who composed it for the television series. Post Malone recorded a cover of the television show's theme song for the film. The soundtrack album was released on May 20, 2022, alongside the film's release. The song used in the teaser trailer and the main trailer is "Best Friend" by Saweetie featuring Doja Cat. The songs "Friendship" by Tenacious D, "Now That We Found Love" by Heavy D and the Boyz, and "Laid to Rest" by Lamb of God can be heard in the movie, but are not included in the soundtrack.

==== Soundtrack ====
Chip 'n Dale: Rescue Rangers

Soundtrack album by Brian Tyler
- Released: May 20, 2022
- Studios: Eastwood Scoring Stage, Warner Bros. Studios
- Length: 60:18
- Label: Walt Disney
- Producers: Joe Lisanti; Brian Tyler

Brian Tyler chronology
1883: Season 1, Vol. 2 (2022)	Chip 'n Dale: Rescue Rangers (2022)	Scream VI (2023)

All tracks are written by Brian Tyler, except where indicated.

No.	Title	Writer(s)	Length
1.	"Chip 'n Dale Rescue Rangers Theme" (Post Malone)	Mark Mueller	2:24
2.	"Rescue Rangers Anthem"		2:28
3.	"Sweet Pete Suite"		2:18
4.	"New School, Same Dale"		1:34
5.	"Best Friends"		1:44
6.	"Just a Showbiz Thing"		2:15
7.	"Chip off the Ol' Block"		2:35
8.	"Monterey Jack"		2:41
9.	"Bootlegging"		2:30
10.	"The Case of the Missing Monty"		3:12
11.	"Main Street"		2:29
12.	"The Cheese Cellar"		2:52
13.	"Old Merchandise"		1:30
14.	"A Beary Narrow Escape"		3:18
15.	"Double O'Dale'd"		1:19
16.	"The Crime Lab"		2:00
17.	"The Russian Bathhouse"		3:02
18.	"San Pedro Docks"		2:49
19.	"Mission Chippossible"		2:22
20.	"Not Heroes"		2:38
21.	"Sniffing Out a Clue"		3:22
22.	"Chipnapped"		3:39
23.	"The Bare Necessities" (instrumental)	Terry Gilkyson	2:37
24.	"Dirty Putty"		4:08
25.	"Rangers Reunited"		1:51
26.	"Rescuing Chip"		1:58
27.	"Frankenpete"		3:14
28.	"The Smartest Chipmunks"		4:16
29.	"Rescue Rangers"		5:11
Total length:			60:18

== Release ==
Chip 'n Dale: Rescue Rangers premiered at the El Capitan Theatre in Hollywood, California, on May 16, 2022, and was released as a Disney+ original film on May 20, 2022.

== Reception ==
=== Viewership ===
Nielsen Media Research, which records streaming viewership on certain U.S. television screens, calculated that it was streamed for 594 million minutes from May 16–22, making it the second most-streamed film that week. Whip Media, which tracks viewership data for the more than 21 million worldwide users of its TV Time app, reported that Chip 'n' Dale: Rescue Rangers was the most-streamed film in the U.S. from May 20–29. The streaming aggregator Reelgood, which tracks real-time data from 5 million U.S. users for original and acquired content across SVOD and AVOD services, stated that Chip 'n' Dale: Rescue Rangers was the tenth most-streamed program in the U.S. from May 26 to June 1.

=== Critical reception ===
On the review aggregator website Rotten Tomatoes, 81% of 140 critics' reviews are positive, with an average rating of 6.9/10. The website's consensus reads: "Sometimes some reboots fall through the cracks, but Chip 'n' Dale: Rescue Rangers picks up the slack with a fast, funny film that (almost) never fails." Metacritic, which uses a weighted average, assigned the film a score of 66 out of 100, based on 25 critics, indicating "generally favorable" reviews.

Frank Scheck of The Hollywood Reporter gave it a positive review, saying it succeeded where Space Jam: A New Legacy failed, and called it "the funniest movie of the year so far, either animated or live-action. Or in this case both, since it ingeniously melds the two forms in the cleverest manner since Who Framed Roger Rabbit." Amy Nicholson of Variety wrote: "This frenetic and funny crossbreeding of live action and cartoon is both a reboot and an anti-reboot, a corporate-funded raspberry at corporate IP, and a giddily dumb smart aleck committed to mocking its joke — and making it, too." David Sims of The Atlantic reviewed the movie positively, describing it as a contemporary version of Who Framed Roger Rabbit, and wrote: "The movie works mostly because, through its weird tricks of animation and self-referentiality, it somehow finds a fresh satirical angle. Other films have skewered an industry that's intent on bludgeoning audiences with their own fading memories, but only Chip 'n Dale actually gives those memories a new life." Calum Marsh of The New York Times reviewed the film positively, drawing some comparisons to Who Framed Roger Rabbit, writing, "A wry take on the material that combines animation and live-action comedy, the movie has some of the hip flair and anarchic meta-humor of Who Framed Roger Rabbit, as well as an irreverent, self-referential attitude that's rather appealing." Matt Fowler of IGN scored the movie a 7 out of 10, finding the story "a bit thin", but praising the humor and its handling of pop culture references, while calling Samberg and Mulaney "just the right voice duo to bring these chipmunks back to life."

Benjamin Lee of The Guardian rated the film 3 out of 5 stars, stating, "The script feels a few punch-ups away from being quite as funny as it could have been. But what Gregor and Mand do manage is a neat balance of tone, the knowing satire never falling into self-referential smugness thanks to a healthy dose of both earnestness and a genuine affection for the source material." Jennifer Green of Common Sense Media rated the movie 3 out of 5 stars, praised the depiction of positive messages, citing friendship and forgiveness, found agreeable the presence of role models across the different characters who fight for justice, while complimenting the diversity of the cast. Nick Allen of RogerEbert.com gave the film a more mixed review, rating it 2.5 out of 4 stars, praising the different styles of animation, complimenting the performances of the voice actors, and stated that the film manages to provide comical moments. He criticized the plot, writing, "At the least the premise is funny [...] but it's still stuck in that usual animated movie spot of trying to make something "for kids," with some irreverent references and deep cuts for the adults. Take away the cameos—in the recording booth, and animated on-screen—and you get something that's a little too close to the same old junk."

Tad Stones, the co-creator of Rescue Rangers, has expressed his approval of the film, calling it "fantastic".

=== Accolades ===
Year	Award	Category	Nominee(s)	Result	Ref.
2022	Hollywood Critics Association TV Awards	Best Streaming Movie	Chip 'n Dale: Rescue Rangers	Won	
2022	Hollywood Music in Media Awards	Best Original Score - Streamed Animated Film (No Theatrical Release)	Brian Tyler	Nominated	
2022	OFTA Television Awards	Best Motion Picture	Chip 'n Dale: Rescue Rangers	Nominated	
2022	Primetime Creative Arts Emmy Awards	Outstanding Television Movie	Alexander Young, Tom Peitzman, Todd Lieberman, and David Hoberman	Won	
2023	Kids' Choice Awards	Favorite Voice from an Animated Movie (Male)	Andy Samberg	Nominated	

== Possible sequel ==
After the film's release, writers Dan Gregor and Doug Mand said they were interested in working on a sequel, but it would depend on the popularity of the first film.
