= The Family (2016 TV series) =

2016 American thriller TV series

- Promotional poster
- Genre: Thriller; Mystery
- Created by: Jenna Bans
- Starring: Joan Allen; Rupert Graves; Alison Pill; Margot Bingham; Zach Gilford; Liam James; Floriana Lima; Madeleine Arthur; Rarmian Newton; Andrew McCarthy
- Composer: Robert Duncan
- Country of origin: United States
- Original language: English
- No. of seasons: 1
- No. of episodes: 12

Production
- Executive producers: Jenna Bans; David Hoberman; Todd Lieberman; Laurie Zaks; Paul McGuigan
- Producer: Sean Ryerson
- Running time: 44 minutes
- Production companies: Minnesota Logging Company; Mandeville Television; ABC Studios

Original release
- Network: ABC
- Release: March 3 – May 15, 2016

The Family is an American thriller television series. It was created and executive produced by Jenna Bans, former ShondaLand regular writer, for ABC. The series follows on the return of the mayor's young son, who was presumed dead after disappearing over a decade earlier. The series stars Joan Allen as Claire Warren, the ambitious and manipulative mayor of the fictional city Red Pines, Maine, and matriarch of the Warren family, who announces her candidacy for governor when her son Adam, played by Liam James, returns after having been kidnapped 10 years prior.

The series premiered on ABC on March 3, 2016, before moving to its regular Sunday night timeslot on March 6, 2016. Its last episode aired on May 15, 2016. On May 12, 2016, it was announced that the series had been cancelled by ABC after one season.

== Cast and characters ==
=== Main ===
- Joan Allen as Claire Warren, matriarch of the Warren family, and the Republican mayor of the fictional city Red Pines, Maine, who runs for Governor of Maine over the course of the series
- Alison Pill as Willa Warren, Claire's daughter and press coordinator
- Margot Bingham as Sergeant Nina Meyer, who made her career after putting Hank in jail for Adam's murder. She is having an affair with John Warren
- Liam James as Ben Murphy, who pretends to be Claire's younger son Adam Warren, who returns after previously being kidnapped 10 years ago.
- Rupert Graves as John Warren, Claire's author husband
- Zach Gilford as Daniel "Danny" Warren, Claire's older son
- Andrew McCarthy as Hank Asher, a registered sex offender and the Warrens' neighbor. He spends ten years in prison for the supposed murder.
- Floriana Lima as Bridey Cruz, a local reporter who has connection to Willa and Danny
- Madeleine Arthur as young Willa Warren
- Rarmian Newton as young Danny Warren

=== Recurring ===
- Maxwell James as young Adam Warren
- Michael Esper as Doug Anderson, the pocked-marked man who kidnapped Adam and Ben.
- Zoe Perry as Jane, Doug Anderson's pregnant girlfriend
- Matthew Lawler as FBI Agent Gabe Clements
- Grant Show as Governor Charlie Lang, Claire's Democratic rival
- Judith Ivey as Mrs. Asher
- Felix Solis as Gus Flores
- Luke Slattery as 'true' Adam Warren
- Ana Maria Jomolca as Agent Lisa Davis
- Matthew Rashid as Ryan
- Armando Riesco as Corey Sanchez
- Jessie Mueller as Fran, a good-natured bakeshop employee who meets Hank
- Alex Steele as young Bridey Cruz

== Episodes ==
No.	Title	Directed by	Written by	Original release date	US viewers (millions)
1	"Pilot"	Paul McGuigan	Jenna Bans	March 3, 2016	5.70
2	"All You See Is Dark"	John Gray	Jenna Bans	March 6, 2016	3.13
3	"Of Puppies and Monsters"	Andrew McCarthy	Alexandra Cunningham	March 13, 2016	3.52
4	"Feathers or Steel"	John Gray	Corey Miller	March 20, 2016	2.64
5	"I Win"	Andrew McCarthy	Jeannine Renshaw	March 27, 2016	2.61
6	"Nowhere Man"	Andrew McCarthy	Bill Krebs	April 3, 2016	3.13
7	"All the Livelong Day"	Paul McGuigan	Elizabeth Craft & Sarah Fain	April 10, 2016	3.15
8	"Sweet Jane"	Colin Bucksey	Nicole Paulhus	April 17, 2016	2.98
9	"Betta Male"	Michael Offer	Matt K. Turner & Davita Scarlett	April 24, 2016	2.92
10	"Fun Ways to Tell Boyfriend You're Pregnant"	Holly Dale	Jeannine Renshaw	May 1, 2016	2.85
11	"Election Day"	Colin Bucksey	Bill Krebs & Corey Miller	May 8, 2016	2.56
12	"What Took so Long"	Paul McGuigan	Story by : Jenna Bans; Teleplay by : Elizabeth Craft & Sarah Fain	May 15, 2016	3.30

== Production ==
=== Development and filming ===
On September 24, 2014, it was announced that ABC bought the original concept of the untitled mystery drama from Grey's Anatomy and Scandal regular writer Jenna Bans. The series is produced by ABC Studios and Mandeville Television; Bans serves as executive producer with David Hoberman, Todd Lieberman and Laurie Zaks. ABC greenlighted the pilot on January 28, 2015.

The pilot episode, directed by Paul McGuigan, began filming on March 12, 2015, in Vancouver, British Columbia. Later episodes began filming in New York City in September 2015.

=== Casting ===
Casting advertisement began in February 2015. On February 13, Zach Gilford was the first to be announced as a regular cast member, playing the role of the older brother. On February 19 Liam James was cast in the key role of the young son who was presumed dead. On February 25, it was announced that Margot Bingham was cast as one of the female lead roles, playing a police sergeant. On February 25, it was announced that three-time Oscar nominee Joan Allen will play the leading role of mayor and Warren family matriarch. The show would be her first broadcast series regular role after many years starring in movies. On the same day Alison Pill was cast as the mayor's daughter and campaign manager. Floriana Lima was cast as a young reporter. On March 10 it was announced that Andrew McCarthy will play Warren's former neighbor who spent 10 years in prison for Adam's murder. On March 16, it was announced that Rupert Graves was cast in the final series regular role as Claire Warren's husband.

On October 2, 2015, Grant Show joined the series in the major recurring role as the Democratic governor and Claire's rival.

== Reception ==
=== Critical response ===
The Family has received mixed reviews from critics. On the review aggregator website Rotten Tomatoes, 61% of 33 critics' reviews are positive. The website's consensus reads, "The Family takes a confusing, convoluted course to solve its central mystery that few will want to follow, despite a game performance from Joan Allen." Metacritic, which uses a weighted average, assigned the film a score of 58 out of 100, based on 22 critics, indicating "mixed or average reviews".

The performances of McCarthy, Pill, and Allen were praised by critics. Stacey Ritzen of Uproxx wrote that "the cast all bring their A game, particularly Allen as the ball-busting matriarch and McCarthy, who lends genuine creepiness and dread to the role." Dominic Patten of Deadline Hollywood praised Allen's and Pill's performances, and wrote that Pill "delivers a rooted multi-level performance that is pretty big league unto itself". Ellen Gray of Philadelphia Daily News praised McCarthy's performance, writing that "while we're waiting to be further mystified, there's plenty to see, including McCarthy's scene-stealing performance as a character who might be as misunderstood as Boo Radley, or might truly be the bogeyman of our worst nightmares."

Other critics slammed the writing and casting. Tim Goodman of The Hollywood Reporter called the show, "Poorly written and completely ridiculous." Jeff Jensen of Entertainment Weekly gave it a C−, summarizing it as a "sour, formulaic expression of ABC's penchant for buzzy, 'sticky' potboilers." He wrote that the show delivered a "shallow treatment of material that deserves more maturity, more empathy, more savvy about American culture. It shows capacity for interesting ideas but has only meager, cliché imagination for them."

=== Ratings ===
No.	Title	Air date	Rating/share (18–49)	Viewers (millions)	DVR (18–49)	DVR viewers (millions)	Total (18–49)	Total viewers (millions)
1	"Pilot"	March 3, 2016	1.5/5	5.70	TBA	TBA	TBA	TBA
2	"All You See Is Dark"	March 6, 2016	0.8/2	3.13	0.7	2.30	1.5	5.43
3	"Of Puppies and Monsters"	March 13, 2016	0.8/3	3.52	0.8	2.11	1.6	5.63
4	"Feathers or Steel"	March 20, 2016	0.7/2	2.64	0.6	1.96	1.3	4.60
5	"I Win"	March 27, 2016	0.6/2	2.61	0.7	TBA	1.3	TBA
6	"Nowhere Man"	April 3, 2016	0.7/2	3.13	0.6	1.79	1.3	4.91
7	"All the Livelong Day"	April 10, 2016	0.8/2	3.15	0.6	1.84	1.4	4.99
8	"Sweet Jane"	April 17, 2016	0.8/2	2.98	0.6	1.79	1.4	4.76
9	"Betta Male"	April 24, 2016	0.8/2	2.92	0.7	1.90	1.5	4.82
10	"Fun Ways to Tell Boyfriend You're Pregnant"	May 1, 2016	0.8/2	2.85	0.5	1.60	1.3	4.45
11	"Election Day"	May 8, 2016	0.7/2	2.56	0.6	1.76	1.3	4.31
12	"What Took so Long"	May 15, 2016	0.8/3	3.30	0.6	1.71	1.4	5.01
