= Todd Lieberman =

American film and television producer (born 1973)

- Born: Todd Darren Lieberman; February 20, 1973 (age 53); Cleveland, Ohio, U.S.
- Education: University of Pennsylvania
- Occupations: Film and television producer
- Years active: 1996–present
- Spouse: Heather Zeegen (m. 2001)
- Children: 2

Todd Darren Lieberman (born February 20, 1973) is an American film and television producer. He founded Hidden Pictures Media in 2022 and won an Emmy for Chip 'n Dale: Rescue Rangers in the same year. He co-founded Mandeville Films and Television with David Hoberman in 2002. Mandeville has produced several notable films, including The Fighter, which won two Academy Awards in 2010, and for which Lieberman was nominated for the Academy Award for Best Picture.

== Early life ==
Todd was born to a Jewish family in Cleveland, and grew up in Lyndhurst and Pepper Pike, Ohio. He graduated from Hawken School. and the University of Pennsylvania. There, he was a member of the Mask and Wig Club. He performed with local theatre groups in Ohio before college where he continued to perform, then moving to Los Angeles in 1995. He began there with acting and then moved on to writing, reviewing film scripts, then on to directing and producing. He earned a Bachelor of Arts degree from the University of Pennsylvania in 1995 where he was a member of the Alpha Epsilon Pi fraternity (Gamma Chapter, Omicron pledge class) and The Mask and Wig Club.

== Career ==
Lieberman was Senior Vice President for International Finance at the production company Hyde Park Entertainment, which produced and co-financed films such as Anti-Trust, Bandits and Moonlight Mile. Lieberman established himself at the international sales and distribution company Summit Entertainment, where he progressed, thanks to championing the independent film Memento and acquiring the rights to American Pie.

In 1999, Lieberman was hired by David Hoberman to work for Mandeville Films. After a short hiatus, the two re-formed the production company as Mandeville Films and Television in 2002, with both serving as co-owners and company partners. In 2001, he was named one of the "35 under 35" people to watch in the business by The Hollywood Reporter and was named by the same The Hollywood Reporter as 30 of the most powerful producers in the business in 2015.

His films have accrued several accolades over the years, including a People’s Choice Award for The Proposal, the AFI Movie of the Year Award and an Academy Award nomination for The Fighter, the PGA Award for Wonder, the Hollywood Film Award for Stronger (2017) and an Emmy for Chip 'n Dale: Rescue Rangers.

In 2018, Lieberman was awarded the key to the state of Ohio.

In 2022, Lieberman launched Hidden Pictures, a film and television production company, with a first-look film deal at Lionsgate. Recent projects under the Hidden Pictures banner include Paul Feig's thriller The Housemaid, an adaptation of Freida McFadden's novel released by Lionsgate in 2025, the MGM+ television series Robin Hood, which premiered in 2025 and was renewed for a second season in 2026, and the Prime Video documentary series Soul Power: The Legend of the American Basketball Association. The Housemaid grossed $400.5 million worldwide, and Lionsgate subsequently set a sequel, The Housemaid's Secret, for release in 2027.

Lieberman also produced the Netflix film War Machine, starring Alan Ritchson, which was released in 2026. The film later appeared on Netflix's all-time Top 10 Most Popular Movies list, ranking ninth with 139.9 million views.

== Personal life ==
Lieberman is married to former film producer Heather Lieberman (née Zeegen). Together, the couple have two sons, Jasper and Isadore. He is a member of the Academy of Motion Picture Arts and Sciences, the Academy of Television Arts & Sciences, and is a mentor at the Producers Guild of America.

Lieberman serves on the Creative Council of Represent.Us, a nonpartisan anti-corruption organization and serves as a judge on the Hamptons International Film Festival.

In 2022, the University of Pennsylvania honored Lieberman with Penn's Creative Spirit Award.

In 2026, Cleveland Jewish News included Lieberman on its list of 250 notable Jewish Northeast Ohioans.

== Filmography ==
=== Executive producer ===
Film

- The Last Shot (2004)
- Beauty Shop (2005)
- Eight Below (2006)
- The Shaggy Dog (2006)
- Five Fingers (2006)
- The Divergent Series: Insurgent (2015)
- Broken Horses (2015)
- The Divergent Series: Allegiant (2016)

Television

- The Kill Point (2007)
- Detroit 1-8-7 (2010−11)
- Wicked City (2015)
- The Family (2016)
- Sing It! (2016)
- The Fix (2019)
- Harlem's Kitchen (2020) (TV pilot)
- Hit & Run (2021)
- Robin Hood (2025)
- The Hypnotist's Love Story (TBA) (TV pilot)
- Robin Hood (2025)
- Soul Power: The Legend of the American Basketball Association (2026)

TV movies

- Geek Charming (2011)
- King John (2013)
- Warriors (2014)
- Sea of Fire (2014)
- The Mission (2018)
- Steps (2018)

=== Producer ===
- Bringing Down the House (2003) (Co-producer)
- Raising Helen (2004) (Co-producer)
- Wild Hogs (2007)
- Traitor (2008)
- Beverly Hills Chihuahua (2008)
- The Lazarus Project (2008)
- The Proposal (2009)
- Surrogates (2009)
- The Fighter (2010)
- The Muppets (2011)
- Warm Bodies (2013)
- 21 & Over (2013)
- Muppets Most Wanted (2014)
- The Duel (2016)
- Beauty and the Beast (2017)
- Stronger (2017)
- Wonder (2017)
- Extinction (2018)
- The Aeronauts (2019)
- Chip 'n Dale: Rescue Rangers (2022)
- Shotgun Wedding (2022)
- White Bird (2024)
- The Housemaid (2025)
- War Machine (2026)
- Voltron (2027)
- The Housemaid's Secret (2027)
- Rabbids (TBA)
- Untitled Mike Thornton biopic film (TBA)

== Awards and nominations ==
Year	Award	Category	Work	Result
2008	Black Reel Awards	Best Film	Traitor (shared with Don Cheadle, Jeffrey Silver and David Hoberman)	Nominated
2010	Academy Awards	Best Picture	The Fighter (shared with David Hoberman and Mark Wahlberg)	Nominated
2010	Awards Circuit Community Awards	ACCA – Best Motion Picture	The Fighter (shared with David Hoberman and Mark Wahlberg)	Nominated
2010	Awards Circuit Community Awards	Davis Award – Best Motion Picture	The Fighter (shared with Dorothy Aufiero, Ryan Kavanaugh, Paul Tamasy and Mark Wahlberg)	Nominated
2011	AFI Awards	Movie of the Year	The Fighter (shared with David Hoberman and Mark Wahlberg)	Won
2011	PGA Awards	Best Theatrical Motion Picture	The Fighter (shared with David Hoberman and Mark Wahlberg)	Nominated
2012	Christopher Awards	Feature Film	The Muppets (shared with James Bobin, Martin G. Baker, Bill Barretta, David Hoberman, John G. Scotti, Jason Segel, Nicholas Stoller)	Won
2012	BAFTA Awards	BAFTA Children's Award for Best Feature Film	The Muppets (shared with David Hoberman and James Bobin)	Nominated
2014	BAFTA Awards	BAFTA Kids' Vote – Feature Film	Muppets Most Wanted (shared with James Bobin, David Hoberman and Nicholas Stoller)	Nominated
2022	Emmy Awards	Outstanding Television Movie	Chip 'n Dale: Rescue Rangers	Won
2025	Christopher Awards	Feature Film	White Bird (shared with David Hoberman and R.J. Palacio)	Won
