= Mandeville Films =

American independent film production company

- Type: Private
- Industry: Motion pictures; Television
- Founded: January 15, 1995; 31 years ago (original); August 1, 2002; 24 years ago (relaunch)
- Founder: David Hoberman
- Defunct: July 26, 1999; 27 years ago (original)
- Successor: Hyde Park Entertainment (original)
- Headquarters: Burbank, California, U.S.
- Key people: Todd Lieberman (partner); Laurie Zaks (president of TV); Alex Young (senior VP)
- Owner: David Hoberman; Todd Lieberman
- Website: mandfilms.com

Mandeville Films is an American film and television production company headquartered in Burbank, California. The company was founded in 1995 by David Hoberman. After a three-year hiatus, the company re-formed as Mandeville Films and Television in 2002; Hoberman and Lieberman were partners and co-owners.

== History ==
Film executive David Hoberman founded Mandeville Films in January 1995 as he exited Walt Disney Studios with a five-year, multi-picture production deal.

In 1999, Todd Lieberman became studio partner and as president. A week later, Hoberman and its employees both left Mandeville to form a self-financing outfit, Hyde Park Entertainment, with Ashok Amritraj (former founder of Franchise Pictures), with split deals at the Walt Disney Studios and Metro-Goldwyn-Mayer (MGM) as the company initially went inactive.

In 2002, Amritraj and Hoberman split their ties, and Hoberman himself reformed Mandeville Films with an exclusive five-year contract with Walt Disney Studios. Hoberman brought along fellow producer Todd Lieberman as a partner, who worked with Hoberman when he was senior vice president for international finance at Hyde Park Entertainment.

When Mandeville Films returned to the studios, it was scheduled to produce two films each for Touchstone and MGM: Walking Tall, Raising Helen, The Last Shot, and Beauty Shop. The studio itself went back to Disney in 2006 to co-produce Eight Below and The Shaggy Dog back-to-back.

Mandeville Films has an ongoing partnership with ABC; they renewed their contracts in July 2015 for two more years.

In May 2018, Mandeville Films ended its partnership with Disney to sign with Universal Pictures for a "first-look production agreement". In 2022, Todd Lieberman split off their ties from the production company. The group was later reformed as Hobie Films with a deal with Lionsgate on February 21, 2023.

== Filmography ==
=== Feature films ===
==== 1990s ====
Year	Title	Distributor	Notes
1996	Mr. Wrong	Buena Vista Pictures	co-production with Touchstone Pictures; first film
1997	The 6th Man	Buena Vista Pictures	co-production with Touchstone Pictures
1997	George of the Jungle	Buena Vista Pictures	co-production with Walt Disney Pictures, Jay Ward Productions and The Avnet-Kerner Company
1998	Senseless	Dimension Films	co-production with Gold/Miller Productions
1998	The Negotiator	Warner Bros. Pictures	co-production with Regency Enterprises, New Regency and Taurus Films
1998	I'll Be Home for Christmas	Buena Vista Pictures	co-production with Walt Disney Pictures
1999	The Other Sister	Buena Vista Pictures	co-production with Touchstone Pictures

==== 2000s ====
Year	Title	Distributor	Notes
2003	Bringing Down the House	Buena Vista Pictures	co-production with Touchstone Pictures and Hyde Park Entertainment
2004	Walking Tall	MGM Distribution Co.	co-production with Metro-Goldwyn-Mayer Pictures, WWE Films and Hyde Park Entertainment
2004	Raising Helen	Buena Vista Pictures	co-production with Touchstone Pictures, Beacon Pictures and Hyde Park Entertainment
2004	The Last Shot	Buena Vista Pictures	co-production with Touchstone Pictures
2005	Beauty Shop	MGM Distribution Co.	co-production with Metro-Goldwyn-Mayer Pictures, State Street Pictures and Flavour Unit Films
2006	Eight Below	Buena Vista Pictures	co-production with Walt Disney Pictures, Spyglass Entertainment and The Kennedy/Marshall Company
2006	The Shaggy Dog	Buena Vista Pictures	co-production with Walt Disney Pictures and Boxing Cat Films
2008	Traitor	Overture Films	co-production with Crescendo Productions and Hyde Park Entertainment
2008	Beverly Hills Chihuahua	Walt Disney Studios Motion Pictures	co-production with Walt Disney Pictures
2008	The Lazarus Project	Sony Pictures Home Entertainment	Direct-to-video; co-production with Inferno Distribution, Be Good Productions and Scion Films
2009	The Proposal	Walt Disney Studios Motion Pictures	co-production with Touchstone Pictures
2009	Surrogates	Walt Disney Studios Motion Pictures	co-production with Touchstone Pictures, Top Shelf Productions and Brownstone Productions

==== 2010s ====
Year	Title	Distributor	Notes
2010	The Fighter	Paramount Pictures	co-production with Relativity Media, Protozoa Pictures and Closest to the Hole Productions
2011	The Muppets	Walt Disney Studios Motion Pictures	co-production with Walt Disney Pictures and The Muppets Studio
2013	Warm Bodies	Lionsgate	co-production with Summit Entertainment
2013	21 & Over	Relativity Media	co-production with Virgin Produced and SkyLand Entertainment
2014	Muppets Most Wanted	Walt Disney Studios Motion Pictures	co-production with Walt Disney Pictures and The Muppets Studio
2015	The Divergent Series: Insurgent	Lionsgate	co-production with Summit Entertainment and Red Wagon Entertainment
2016	The Divergent Series: Allegiant	Lionsgate	co-production with Summit Entertainment and Red Wagon Entertainment
2016	The Duel	Lionsgate Premiere	co-production with Atomic Entertainment, Mississippix Studios, 26 Films, Bron Capital Partners and Crystal Wealth
2017	Beauty and the Beast	Walt Disney Studios Motion Pictures	co-production with Walt Disney Pictures
2017	Stronger	Lionsgate	co-production with Roadside Attractions, Bold Films and Nine Stories Productions
2017	Wonder	Lionsgate	co-production with TIK Films, Participant Media and Walden Media
2018	Extinction	Netflix	co-production with Good Universe
2019	The Aeronauts	Amazon Studios	co-production with Entertainment One and FilmNation Entertainment

==== 2020s ====
Year	Title	Distributor	Notes
2022	Chip 'n Dale: Rescue Rangers	Disney+	co-production with Walt Disney Pictures
2023	Shotgun Wedding	Amazon Prime Video (US)	co-production with Lionsgate, Maximum Effort and Nuyorican Productions
2023	Mr. Monk's Last Case: A Monk Movie	Peacock	co-production with Andy Breckman Productions and Universal Cable Productions
2024	White Bird	Lionsgate	co-production with Participant and 2DUX²

==== Upcoming ====
Year	Title	Distributor	Notes	References
TBA	Undercover	Lionsgate		
TBA	Untitled Rabbids film	Lionsgate	co-production with Ubisoft Film & Television and Stoopid Buddy Stoodios	
TBA	Treasure Island	Universal Pictures		
TBA	Scholomance	Universal Pictures		
TBA	Little Monsters	Universal Pictures		
TBA	Swan Lake	Universal Pictures		

=== Television series ===
Year	Title	Network	Notes	Seasons	Episodes
1999	Ryan Caulfield: Year One	Fox	co-production with Regency Television and Fox Television Studios	1	8
2002–2009	Monk	USA Network	co-production with Touchstone Television, USA Cable Entertainment (seasons 1–3), NBC Universal Television Studio (seasons 3–6), Universal Media Studios (season 6) and Universal Cable Productions (seasons 7–8)	8	125
2007	The Kill Point	Spike	co-production with Lionsgate Television	1	8
2010–2011	Detroit 1-8-7	ABC	co-production with ABC Studios and Remainder Men Films	1	18
2015	Wicked City	ABC	co-production with ABC Studios	1	8
2016	The Family	ABC	co-production with ABC Studios and Minnesota Logging Company	1	12
2019	The Fix	ABC	co-production with ABC Studios and Happier in Hollywood	1	10

=== Made for television films ===
Year	Title	Network	Notes
1997	Toothless	ABC	co-production with Walt Disney Television
1998	Brink!	Disney Channel	
2011	Geek Charming	Disney Channel	
