= Preston Jones (actor) =

American actor (born 1983)

- Born: August 21, 1983 (age 42); Dallas, Texas, U.S.
- Occupation: Actor
- Years active: 2004–present

Preston Jones (born August 21, 1983) is an American actor, known for his roles in Detention, Spring Break '83, and Road Trip: Beer Pong.

== Personal life ==
Preston was born in Dallas, Texas on August 21, 1983. He started acting his senior year in high school when he attended DeSoto High School in DeSoto, Texas, where he graduated in 2001. Preston then went on to study Theatre and Radio Television Film at The University of Texas at Austin. In Austin, he performed in over a dozen plays, getting the most acclaim for his performance in the John Patrick play, The Hasty Heart. To prepare for his role as the Scotsman, Lachlan McLachlan, Preston traveled to Scotland to research the Scottish culture and dialect.

After graduating from UT Austin and acting in a few TV pilots (The WB's "Jack and Bobby" and Richard Linklater's HBO pilot, "$5.15/hr"), he moved to Los Angeles to pursue acting professionally. Since moving to Los Angeles, Preston has starred opposite Chris O'Donnell, Adam Goldberg, John Goodman, David Carradine, and DJ Qualls in both television and film.

Preston has an identical twin brother, Drew, who lives in Fort Worth, Texas. Preston married his high school friend Ashley Howe.

== Filmography ==
=== Film ===
Year	Title	Role	Notes
2006	Miracle Dogs Too	Josh	Direct-to-video
2007	Superbad	Bully	Uncredited
2008	Next of Kin	French Student	
2008	Road Trip: Beer Pong	Andy	direct-to-DVD
2011	Bad Actress	Tyler Shane Donovan	
2017	Lessons in Breaking Up	Sebastian Hayes	
2018	Minds of Its Own	Stanton	
2018	Baby Obsession	Jon	

=== Television ===
Year	Title	Role	Notes
2004	Jack & Bobby	Nick	Episode: "Pilot"
2005	Head Cases	Brad	Episode: "In the Club"
2009	True Blood	Dirk	Episodes: "Keep This Party Going" and "Shake and Fingerpop"
2010	$#*! My Dad Says	Josh	Episodes: "The Truth About Dads & Moms" and "Not Without My Jacket"
2010	Sonny with a Chance	Grant Mitchell	Episodes: "Grady with a Chance of Sonny" and "Sonny with a Grant"
2011	I'm in the Band	Kurt Dirkman	Episode: "Yo Check My House"
2011	CSI: NY	Chad Hendricks	Episode: "Keep It Real"
2011	Death Valley	Deputy Chief Ribbings	Episode: "The Hottest Day of the Year"
2012	Austin & Ally	Miami Mack	Episode: "Deejays & Demos"
2012	The Mentalist	Tark Mitchum	Episode: "So Long, and Thanks for All the Red Snapper"
2012	Femme Fatales	Aaron	Episode: "Bad Science"
2012	Broken Bonds	Trevor Gold	Recurring role, 4 episodes
2014	Stalker	Paul Watson	Episode: "Manhunt"
2014	Stitchers	Randall Cook	Episode: "Pretty Little Lawyers"
2016	Sing It!	Troy Blue	Main role
2016	General Hospital	Evan Boyd	2 episodes
2017	NCIS	Navy Petty Officer First Class David Collins	Episode: "M.I.A."
2018	Hotel Du Loone	Todd	Episode: "Runaway Bride"
2019	Cousins for Life	Ansel	Episode: "Super Ivy"
2020	Hawaii Five-0	Leo	Episode: "He kohu puahiohio i ka ho'olele i ka lepo i luna"
