= David Hoberman =

American film and TV producer (born 1952)

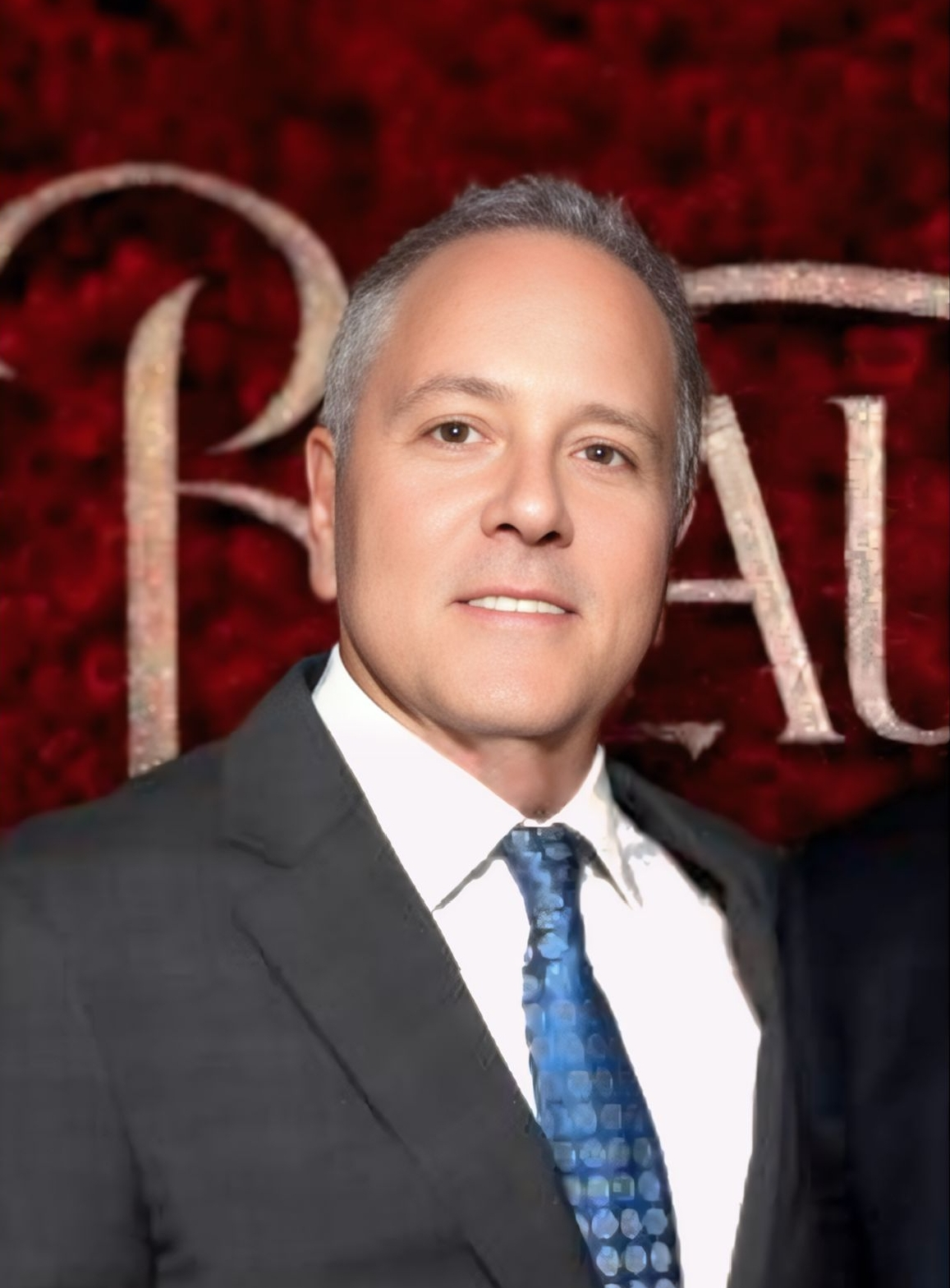
- Hoberman at the premiere of Beauty and the Beast in March 2017
- Born: David Elliot Hoberman; September 19, 1952 (age 74); New York City, U.S.
- Occupations: Film and television producer
- Years active: 1977–present
- Spouse: Tia Yousse (divorced)
- Children: 3
- Parent: Ben Hoberman (father)

David Elliot Hoberman (born September 19, 1952) is an American film and television producer, best known as the co-creator and executive producer of the USA Network television series Monk, and the founder and co-owner of Mandeville Films. He has produced over 40 films in his career, including the 2010 drama film The Fighter, for which he was nominated for the Academy Award for Best Picture.

== Early life ==
Hoberman was born on September 19, 1952, the son of radio executive Ben Hoberman (1922–2014) and his wife Jacklyn (née Kanter; 1922–2013). Hoberman has an older brother, Thomas (Tom), an entertainment lawyer, and a younger sister, Joan (Joanie). He is from a Jewish family.

== Career ==
=== Beginnings ===
Hoberman began his career in show business with a mailroom job at the American Broadcasting Company, where he worked with Michael Eisner and Barry Diller and later joined Norman Lear's Tandem Productions. He also served as a talent agent at the International Creative Management.. In 1985, he was named Vice President of Production at Walt Disney Studios,and elevated to president of the Motion Picture Group at Disney in 1988, where he was responsible for production of all feature films under Walt Disney & Touchstone,. Hoberman added Hollywood Pictures to his slate when Ricardo Mestres departed in April of 1994.

=== Mandeville Films ===
Hoberman founded Mandeville Films, an independent production company, in 1995. In 1999, he was made partner of film production and financing company Hyde Park Entertainment, only to leave three years later. In 2002, along with business partner Todd Lieberman (a former Mandeville employee), Hoberman re-formed Mandeville Films and Television at Disney, after spending three years at Metro-Goldwyn-Mayer. Since 2002, Mandeville has produced a number of films with Disney, such as Bringing Down the House, Raising Helen, The Last Shot, The Shaggy Dog, Eight Below, Beverly Hills Chihuahua, and The Muppets.

He was the producer of Disney's live-action picture Honey, I Shrunk the Kids and the first ever stop-motion animated full-length feature, The Nightmare Before Christmas, which was produced by Tim Burton.

=== Monk ===
Hoberman, along with Andy Breckman, was the co-creator of the American comedy-drama detective mystery television series, Monk, and the protagonist of the series, Adrian Monk.

Monk was originally envisioned as a "more goofy and physical" Inspector Clouseau type of character. However, Hoberman came up with the idea of a detective with obsessive–compulsive disorder (OCD). This was inspired by his own bout with self-diagnosed obsessive–compulsive disorder; in a Pittsburgh Post-Gazette interview, he stated: "Like Monk, I couldn't walk on cracks and had to touch poles. I have no idea why – but if I didn't do these things, something terrible would happen."

== Personal life ==
Hoberman was previously married to Tia Hoberman (née Yousse), with whom he has three children. He is a board member of the Starlight Starbright Children's Foundation and recently joined the Anxiety Disorder Association of America. He has been a visiting assistant professor with UCLA, and was a former board member of the Los Angeles Free Clinic. On October 4, 2011, David Hoberman was selected to be one of the Board of Trustees for Suffolk University in Boston, Massachusetts.

== Filmography ==
He was a producer in all films unless otherwise noted.

=== Film ===
Year	Film	Credit	Notes
1977	American Raspberry	Associate producer	
1996	Mr. Wrong	Executive producer	
1997	The 6th Man		
1997	George of the Jungle		
1998	Senseless		
1998	The Negotiator		
1998	I'll Be Home for Christmas		
1999	The Other Sister	Executive producer	
2001	Antitrust	Executive producer	
2001	What's the Worst That Could Happen?		
2001	Original Sin	Executive producer	
2001	Bandits		
2002	Moonlight Mile	Executive producer	
2003	Bringing Down the House		
2003	George of the Jungle 2	Executive producer	Direct-to-video
2004	Walking Tall		
2004	Raising Helen		
2004	The Last Shot		
2005	Beauty Shop		
2006	Eight Below		
2006	The Shaggy Dog		
2006	Five Fingers	Executive producer	
2008	Traitor		
2008	Beverly Hills Chihuahua		
2008	The Lazarus Project		
2009	The Proposal		
2009	Surrogates		
2010	The Fighter		
2011	Beverly Hills Chihuahua 2		Direct-to-video
2011	The Muppets		
2012	Beverly Hills Chihuahua 3: Viva la Fiesta!		Direct-to-video
2013	Warm Bodies		
2013	21 & Over		
2014	Muppets Most Wanted		
2015	The Divergent Series: Insurgent	Executive producer	
2015	Broken Horses	Executive producer	
2016	The Divergent Series: Allegiant	Executive producer	
2016	The Duel		
2017	Beauty and the Beast		
2017	Stronger		
2017	Wonder		
2018	Extinction		
2019	The Aeronauts		
2022	Chip 'n Dale: Rescue Rangers		
2022	Shotgun Wedding		
2024	White Bird		
2027	Voltron		
TBA	Rabbids		

Production manager

Year	Film	Role	Notes
1986	Ruthless People	Executive in charge of production: Walt Disney Studios	Uncredited
1987	Stakeout	Executive in charge of production: Walt Disney Studios	Uncredited
1989	Dead Poets Society	Executive in charge of production: Walt Disney Studios	Uncredited
1989	Honey, I Shrunk the Kids	Executive in charge of production: Walt Disney Studios	Uncredited
1990	Pretty Woman	Executive in charge of production: Walt Disney Studios	Uncredited
1991	What About Bob?	Executive in charge of production: Walt Disney Studios	Uncredited
1991	The Doctor	Executive in charge of production: Walt Disney Studios	Uncredited
1991	Father of the Bride	Executive in charge of production: Walt Disney Studios	Uncredited
1992	Sister Act	Executive in charge of production: Walt Disney Studios	Uncredited
1994	When a Man Loves a Woman	Executive in charge of production: Walt Disney Studios	Uncredited

As an actor

Year	Film	Role	Notes
2003	George of the Jungle 2	Airline Passenger	Direct-to-video

Miscellaneous crew

Year	Film	Role
1978	Blue Collar	Production executive: T.A.T. Communications Company

=== Television ===
Year	Title	Credit	Notes
1997	Toothless	Executive producer	Television film
1998	Brink!	Executive producer	Television film
1999	Ryan Caulfield: Year One	Executive producer	
2006	A.K.A.	Executive producer	Television film
2007	The Kill Point	Executive producer	
2002−09	Monk	Executive producer	
2010−11	Detroit 1-8-7	Executive producer	
2011	Geek Charming	Executive producer	Television film
2013	King John	Executive producer	Television film
2014	Warriors	Executive producer	Television film
2014	Sea of Fire	Executive producer	Television film
2015	Wicked City	Executive producer	
2016	The Family	Executive producer	
2016	Sing It!	Executive producer	
2018	The Mission	Executive producer	Television film
2018	Steps	Executive producer	Television film
2019	The Fix	Executive producer	
2020	Harlem's Kitchen	Executive producer	Television pilot
2021	Hit & Run	Executive producer	
—N/a	The Hypnotist's Love Story	Executive producer	Television pilot

As director

Year	Title
2009	Monk

== Awards and nominations ==
Year	Award	Category	Work	Result
2008	Black Reel Awards	Best Film	Traitor (shared with Don Cheadle, Jeffrey Silver and Todd Lieberman)	Nominated
2010	Academy Awards	Best Picture	The Fighter (shared with Todd Lieberman and Mark Wahlberg)	Nominated
2010	Awards Circuit Community Awards	ACCA – Best Motion Picture	The Fighter (shared with Todd Lieberman and Mark Wahlberg)	Nominated
2011	AFI Awards	Movie of the Year	The Fighter (shared with Todd Lieberman and Mark Wahlberg)	Won
2011	PGA Awards	Best Theatrical Motion Picture	The Fighter (shared with Todd Lieberman and Mark Wahlberg)	Nominated
2012	Christopher Awards	Feature Film	The Muppets (shared with James Bobin, Martin G. Baker, Bill Barretta, Todd Lieberman, John G. Scotti, Jason Segel, Nicholas Stoller)	Won
2012	BAFTA Awards	BAFTA Children's Award for Best Feature Film	The Muppets (shared with Todd Lieberman and James Bobin)	Nominated
2014	BAFTA Awards	BAFTA Kids' Vote – Feature Film	Muppets Most Wanted (shared with James Bobin, Todd Lieberman and Nicholas Stoller)	Nominated
