= The Last Shot =

- Theatrical release poster
- Directed by: Jeff Nathanson
- Written by: Jeff Nathanson
- Produced by: Larry Brezner; David Hoberman
- Starring: Matthew Broderick; Alec Baldwin; Toni Collette; Calista Flockhart; Ray Liotta; Tim Blake Nelson; James Rebhorn; Tony Shalhoub
- Cinematography: John Lindley
- Edited by: David Rosenbloom
- Music by: Rolfe Kent
- Production companies: Touchstone Pictures; Mandeville Films
- Distributed by: Buena Vista Pictures Distribution
- Release date: September 24, 2004
- Running time: 93 minutes
- Country: United States
- Language: English
- Box office: $541,330

The Last Shot is a 2004 American action comedy film starring Matthew Broderick, Alec Baldwin, Toni Collette, Calista Flockhart, Ray Liotta, Tim Blake Nelson, James Rebhorn and Tony Shalhoub. The film is written and directed by Jeff Nathanson, who wrote the Steven Spielberg films Catch Me If You Can and The Terminal. The Last Shot was released by Buena Vista Pictures Distribution on September 24, 2004. The film received mixed to positive reviews from critics and grossed $541,330 at the box office.

== Plot ==
FBI agent Joe Devine has been undercover, trying to infiltrate the mob. Deep on assignment, he loses a finger, and on his return home he's told his dog killed herself out of loneliness.

Reassigned to Rhode Island, Devine has come up with an elaborate scheme to take down infamous mob boss John Gotti. He assumes the role of a Hollywood producer and tells all the right lies to enlist a stooge to help execute his sting.

When a woman, desperate with the endless barking from the kennel next door to her apartment she shares with boyfriend Steven Schats, is about to harm a pomeranian Devine intervenes. He introduces himself to the unsuspecting wannabe screenwriter/director, who works in a cinema and would do just about everything to get the chance to direct a feature film. Schats falls for the pitch, but what Devine does not tell him is that the movie will never be made.

Although Schats' screenplay is titled Arizona, and the main character is supposed to kill herself in a Hopi cave at the end of the movie, he is so desperate to make the film that Devine convinces him to film it in Rhode Island. Fannie Nash, an established producer, is consulted to help with authenticity.

Taken around the potential locations for the various scenes, Schats is clearly unhappy. Once he's provided with a luxurious hotel suite however, he accepts the location more readily. Having a meeting with the city, they are told they must use unionized Teamsters.

Devine's target in Rhode Island is Tommy Sanz, who overhears and muscles in on the production. Devine records Sanz accepting a bribe for the Teamsters' to approve of the production. Instead of ending the investigation at that point as the FBI expects, Devine convinces the bureau to hold out a week longer to catch others racketeering.

They plow ahead with the film production, as Devine has fallen in love with the movie business. Delving into casting, a big name Hollywood actress turns up. Explaining that a previous drug addiction that put her in rehab caused her to be blackballed in Hollywood, she is looking for a way back in.

When Devine's girlfriend Val hears that a big name gets the lead, she causes a scene until he offers her another part. After articles are published about the film, other known actors like Pat Morita express interest. Both FBI agents and Sanz take an interest in the details of the plot.

Devine's mania leads his FBI superiors support of a three-picture deal. He is convinced that he can ensnare more mobsters with a similar scheme, while also producing actual films. Devine throws himself into production full tilt. Just as filming begins, the FBI arrests Gotti and puts an end to the production. They were using it as a decoy, against Devine's wishes and keeping him in the dark.

The film jumps forward two years to the premiere of a movie based on the sting operation called Leaving Arizona. Schats is again working as a manager at a movie theater. Devine visits him and apologizes. Bringing the reel of the one, opening scene that they had shot, he then reveals that he has been working on a screenplay, and Schats gets excited about the pitch.

In the credits, Schats has a new girlfriend, which his apartment's proximity doesn't bother as she's deaf.

== Background ==
The plot of The Last Shot is loosely based on the true story of an FBI sting operation code-named Dramex which was run by FBI agent Garland Schweickhardt, who recruited aspiring screenwriters Dan Lewk and Gary Levy to participate unwittingly in a sting operation aimed at ensnaring mobsters and Teamsters union officials in a bribery scheme. Under the pretext of producing a movie, the FBI planned to catch people taking bribes in exchange for promising not to make trouble when filmmakers used non-union truck drivers and non-union crew members.

Shooting actually occurred in several cities including New Orleans and Las Vegas, while in other major cities, evidence was obtained without using an actual crew made up of FBI personnel. As the investigation progressed from city to city, sealed indictments were obtained and only unsealed when the operation was concluded. Many actual events happened during the shooting that were more hilarious than the movie portrays. At one point, the crew was stranded in the desert between LA and Las Vegas by a broken-down Rolls-Royce.

Arriving at the location in Las Vegas, they found a genuine crew already there shooting Nasty Boys (Which, ironically, was about undercover police officers). The grip truck ran into an elderly lady's car the first day of shooting in New Orleans and the crew wound up paying off the woman with hundreds peeled from a roll of bills. The operation eventually led to indictments against five individuals, several of whom were convicted. The movie itself was shut down before serious filming started.

Lewk and Levy had yet to make a full-length feature film. They were, however, associate producers on The Last Shot and had cameo roles as 'Hollywood Boulevard Types'.

== Cast ==
- Matthew Broderick as Steven Schats
- Alec Baldwin as Joe Devine
- Toni Collette as Emily French
- Calista Flockhart as Valerie Weston
- Ray Liotta as Jack Devine
- Tim Blake Nelson as Marshal Paris
- James Rebhorn as Abe White
- Tony Shalhoub as Tommy Sanz
- Stanley Anderson as Howard Schats (Ben Cartwright)
- W. Earl Brown as Willie Gratzo
- Ian Gomez as Agent Nance
- Buck Henry as Lonnie Bosco
- Evan Jones as Troy Haines
- Tom McCarthy as Agent Pike
- Glenn Morshower as Agent McCaffrey
- Jon Polito as Wally Kamin
- Troy Winbush as Agent Ray Dawson
- Russell Means as himself
- Pat Morita as himself
- Joan Cusack as Fanny Nash (uncredited)
- Robert Evans as himself (uncredited)
- Judy Greer as Girl with Emily French at Movie Premiere (uncredited)
- Eric Roberts as himself (uncredited)
- Shoshannah Stern as Steven's Girlfriend

== Reception ==
On Rotten Tomatoes, the film has an approval rating of 62% based on reviews from 68 critics. The site's consensus states: "Wildly uneven comedy."

According to Roger Ebert, the film “is not a well-oiled enterprise but more of a series of laughs separated by waits for more laughs. It has a kind of earnest, eager quality, and it’s so screwy you feel affection for it;.."

The film only had a limited release in the United States and grossed $464,000. Its worldwide total gross was $538,526.
