= Laurie Zaks =

American television producer

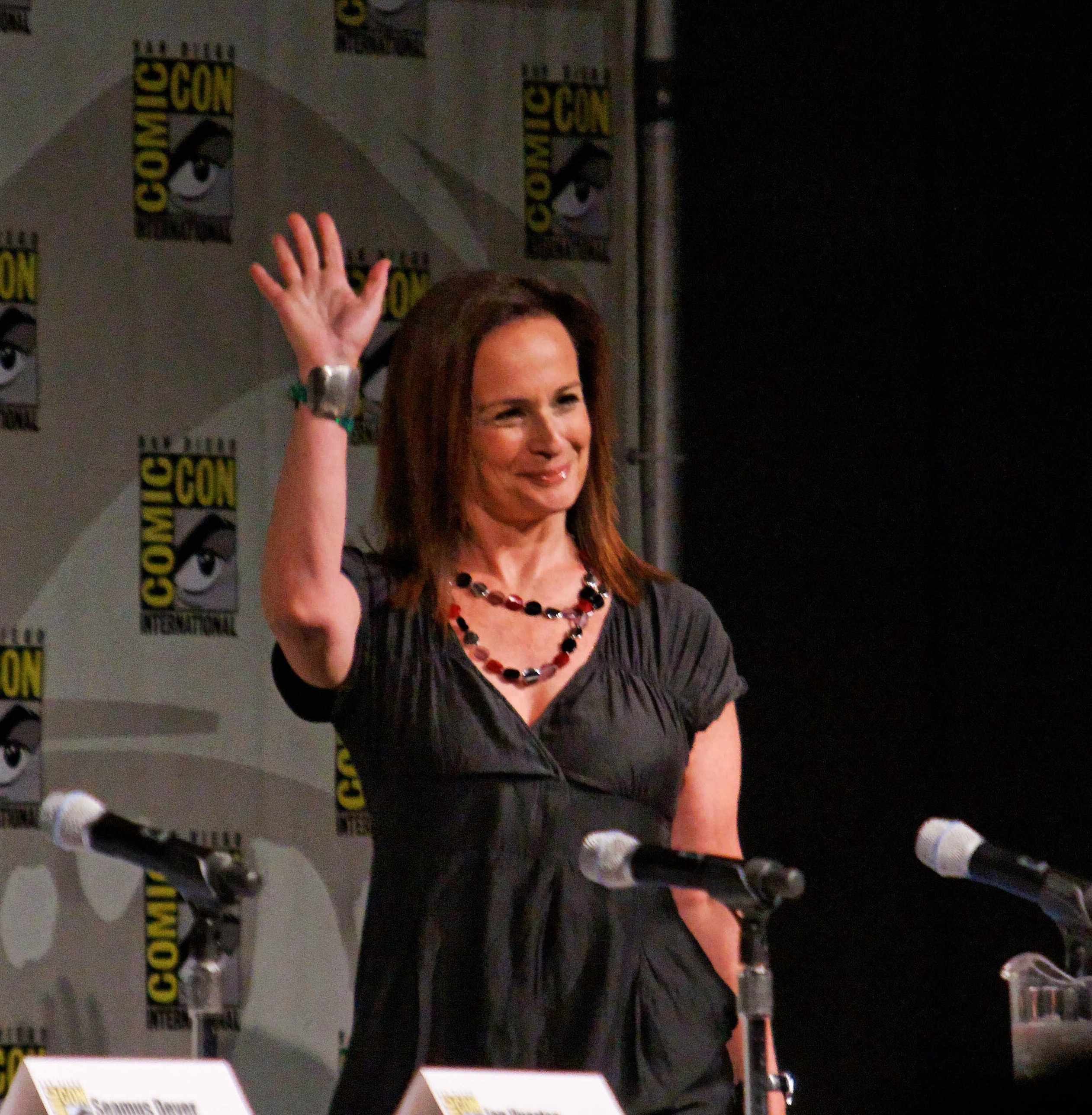
- Zaks at the 2010 San Diego Comic-Con
- Born: Plainview, New York, U.S.
- Occupation: Television producer
- Years active: 1982–present
- Spouse(s): Marc Robinson (divorced); Jeff Horn
- Children: Zachary Robinson

Laurie Ann Zaks is an American television producer. She has been the President of Television at Mandeville Films since 2013. From 1981 to 1984, she worked at NBC's Saturday Night Live. She served as an executive producer on ABC's drama series Castle (2009–2013), and on the short-lived ABC drama series' Wicked City (2015) and The Family (2016). Her son is film composer Zachary "Zach" Robinson.

== Career ==
Zaks previously worked as Vice President of the Comedy Department at Comedy Central, where she was one of the executives originally hired to launch the network in New York City; Vice President of Series Programs at CBS, where she oversaw series such as Everybody Loves Raymond; and Senior Vice President of Series Programs at UPN, where she oversaw series such as Veronica Mars and Buffy the Vampire Slayer.

Following her stints at these companies, she became President of Armyan Bernstein's Beacon Television. At Beacon Television, Zaks developed the pilot and served as executive producer of Castle for the ABC network. She was executive producer of the series from its first season in 2009, until its fifth season in 2013, when she left to work for Mandeville.

Zaks launched her own production company, Second Season, in 2012. She served as executive producer on two of ABC's series, Wicked City (2015) and The Family (2016), and the sitcom web series Sing It! (2016).

== Filmography ==
=== As executive producer ===
- Ny-Lon (2009; unsold pilot for ABC Studios)
- Castle (2009–2013)
- Sea of Fire (2014; unsold pilot for ABC Studios)
- Warriors (2014; unsold pilot for ABC Studios)
- Wicked City (2015)
- The Family (2016)
- Sing It! (2016)

=== As crew member ===
- Saturday Night Live (1982–1986)
