= Jenna Bans =

American screenwriter

- Occupation(s): Screenwriter, producer
- Years active: 2004–present
- Spouse: Justin Spitzer (m. 2007)
- Children: 2

Jenna Bans is an American screenwriter. She is a producer and writer on Grey's Anatomy, and is the creator and the co-producer (along with Shonda Rhimes) of Off the Map, a series which premiered on ABC in January 2011, and was cancelled on May 13, 2011. From 2012 to 2014, she was the regular writer and co-executive producer on another Shonda Rhimes created drama, Scandal, on ABC.

In 2014, Bans created pilot Sea of Fire for ABC. In 2015, she created The Family, also for ABC.

Bans is the creator and executive producer of the NBC series Good Girls, which began broadcasting on February 26, 2018.

== Personal life ==
Bans is married to Superstore creator and writer Justin Spitzer.

== Career ==
Originally hired as a staff writer for Jerry Bruckheimer's cancelled action TV movie Fearless, Bans became a part of the crew of Desperate Housewives in 2004, working as a staff writer and then working her way to executive story editor. In 2006, she was nominated for a Writers Guild of America Award for the screenplay to the Desperate Housewives episode "Next" and in 2007 she received another nomination for the episode "It Takes Two". Bans co-wrote both episodes together with Kevin Murphy.

In 2017, Bans was inspired by a conversation she had with her mother about current politics to create Good Girls.

As a producer, she uses the banner "Minnesota Logging Company."

== Credits ==
=== Producing ===
Television
Year	Title	Notes
2007	Private Practice	
2008–2012	Grey's Anatomy	Co-executive producer
2011	Off the Map	Creator, executive producer
2012–2014	Scandal	Co-executive producer, 2014 consulting producer
2014	Sea of Fire	TV movie; executive producer
2016	The Family	Creator, executive producer
2018–2021	Good Girls	Creator, executive producer
2025	Grosse Pointe Garden Society	Creator, executive producer

=== Writing ===
Television
Year	Show	Notes
2004	Fearless	TV movie; staff writer
2004–2007	Desperate Housewives	Co-written with Kevin Murphy
2007	Private Practice	
2008–2012	Grey's Anatomy	
2011	Off the Map	Also credited as creator
2012–2014	Scandal	Regular writer
2014	Sea of Fire	TV movie
2016	The Family	Regular writer
2018–2021	Good Girls	Also credited as creator
2025	Grosse Pointe Garden Society	Also credited as creator
