= Milfay =

Milfay may refer to:

- Milfay, Oklahoma, a small unincorporated community in Creek County, Oklahoma, US
- "Milfay" (Carnivàle), the first episode of the television series Carnivàle
