= List of awards and nominations received by Carnivàle =

Carnivàle awards and nominations
Awards and nominations
Award	Wins	Nominations
Art Directors Guild Award	1	1
Artios Award	1	1
CDG Award	1	2
Eddie Award	0	1
Emmy Award	5	15
Golden Reel Award	0	2
Satellite Award	0	4
Saturn Award	0	2
VES Awards	1	3
Women's Image Network	2	4
Young Artist Award	0	1

Totals (Note: Certain award groups do not simply award one winner. They acknowledge several different recipients, have runners-up, and have third place. Since this is a specific recognition and is different from losing an award, runner-up mentions are considered wins in this award tally. For simplification and to avoid errors, each award in this list has been presumed to have had a prior nomination.)
- Wins: 11
- Nominations: 36

Carnivàle is an American television series that aired on HBO between 2003 and 2005. Created by Daniel Knauf, the show traces the disparate storylines of a young carnival worker named Ben Hawkins (played by Nick Stahl) and a preacher in California named Brother Justin Crowe (Clancy Brown) during the United States Dust Bowl. Although Carnivàle was praised for its production and art style, the unfolding story proved too inaccessible for the general audience and led to the show's cancellation after two of six planned seasons. The inaugural season of Carnivàle garnered numerous awards and nominations, including five Emmy Awards and two Emmy nominations in the creative arts categories. The second season received eight Emmy nominations. Nominations for two Golden Reel Awards, four Satellite Awards and two Saturn Awards did not result in a win. The only actor of Carnivàle's large main cast to win an award was Adrienne Barbeau ("Ruthie") with a WIN Award (Women's Image Network Awards). Overall, Carnivàle has received eleven awards from thirty-six nominations.

== Costume Designers Guild Awards ==
Founded in 1999, the Costume Designers Guild Awards honors Costume Designers in Motion Pictures, Television, and Commercials. Carnivàle was nominated for a CDG twice, winning in 2003.

Year	Category	Nominee	Result
2003	Excellence in Period/Fantasy Design for Television	Ruth Myers, Terry Dresbach	Won
2005	Outstanding Period/Fantasy for Television	Chrisi Karvonides-Dushenko	Nominated

== Emmy Awards ==
The Emmy is a television production award considered the television equivalent to the Academy Award. The inaugural season of Carnivàle received nominations for seven Emmys in 2004, winning five in creative arts categories. The second season received eight further Emmy nominations in 2005 without a win.

Year	Category	Nominee	Episode	Result
2004	Outstanding Casting for a Drama Series	John Papsidera, Wendy O'Brien	—	Nominated
2004	Outstanding Main Title Design	Angus Wall, Patrick Murphy, Vonetta Taylor	—	Won
2004	Outstanding Art Direction for a Single-Camera Series	Bernt Amadeus Capra, Jeremy Cassells, Leslie McCarthy-Frankenheimer, Dan Bishop, Roger L. King, Gary Kosko, Sara Andrews	"Milfay" (pilot)	Won
2004	Outstanding Cinematography for a Single-Camera Series	Jeff Jur	"Pick A Number"	Won
2004	Outstanding Costumes for a Series	Ruth Myers, Linda Henrikson, Terry Dresbach, Niklas J. Palm, Lucinda Campbell	"Milfay" (pilot)	Won
2004	Outstanding Hairstyling for a Series	Kerry Mendenhall, Louisa V. Anthony, Elizabeth Rabe	"After the Ball Is Over"	Won
2004	Outstanding Makeup for a Series (Non-Prosthetic)	Steve Artmont, Simone Almekias-Siegl	"Babylon"	Nominated
2005	Outstanding Music Composition for a Series (dramatic Underscore)	Jeff Beal	"Lincoln Highway"	Nominated
2005	Outstanding Art Direction for a Single-Camera Series	Dan Bishop, Roger L. King, David Morong, Joyce Anne Gilstrap	"Old Cherry Blossom Road", "Damascus, NE", "Outside New Canaan"	Nominated
2005	Outstanding Cinematography for a Single-Camera Series	Jim Denault	"The Road to Damascus"	Nominated
2005	Outstanding Cinematography for a Single-Camera Series	Jeff Jur	"Lincoln Highway"	Nominated
2005	Outstanding Costumes for a Series	Chrisi Karvonides-Dushenko, Robin Roberts, Devon Renee Anderson	"The Road to Damascus"	Nominated
2005	Outstanding Hairstyling for a Series	Norma Lee, Nanci Cascio, Violet Ortiz	"Outside New Canaan"	Nominated
2005	Outstanding Makeup for a Series (non-prosthetic)	Steve Artmont, Simone Almekias-Siegl, Heather Plott	"Alamogordo, NM"	Nominated
2005	Outstanding Prosthetic Makeup for a Series, Miniseries, Movie or a Special	Rob Hinderstein, Joel Harlow, Kenny Myers	"Damascus, NE"	Nominated

== Golden Reel Awards ==
The Golden Reel Award has been annually presented by the American Motion Picture Sound Editors since 1953, honoring motion picture and television sound editors and their soundtracks. Carnivàle was nominated for two Golden Reel Awards in 2003.

Year	Category	Nominee	Episode	Result
2003	Best Sound Editing in Television Episodic – Sound Effects & Foley	Mace Matiosian, William H. Angarola, Bradley C. Katona, Edmond J. Coblentz Jr., Matt Sawelson	—	Nominated
2003	Best Sound Editing in Television Episodic – Dialogue & ADR	Mace Matiosian, Ruth Adelman, Lloyd Jay Keiser, Jivan Tahmizian	"Tipton"	Nominated

== Satellite Awards ==
The Satellite Award, originally known as the Golden Satellite Award, is an annual award given by the International Press Academy.

Year	Category	Nominee	Result
2003	Best Television Series, Drama	Carnivàle	Nominated
2003	Best Actor in a Series, Drama	Nick Stahl for playing "Ben Hawkins"	Nominated
2003	Best Actress in a Series, Drama	Amy Madigan for playing "Iris Crowe"	Nominated
2003	Best Actress in a Supporting Role in a Series, Drama	Adrienne Barbeau for playing "Ruthie"	Nominated

== Saturn Awards ==
The Saturn Award is an award presented annually by the Academy of Science Fiction, Fantasy and Horror Films to honor the top works in science fiction, fantasy, and horror in film, television, and home video. Carnivàle was nominated in two categories in 2004, but failed to win in either.

Year	Category	Nominee	Result
2004	Best Syndicated/Cable Television Series	Carnivàle	Nominated
2004	Best Supporting Actor in a Television Series	Nick Stahl for playing "Ben Hawkins"	Nominated

== VES Awards ==
The Visual Effects Society represents the full breadth of visual effects practitioners in all areas of entertainment and honors film, television, commercials, music videos and video games with an award since 2002. Carnivàle won one of three nominations in 2003.

Year	Category	Nominee	Episode	Result
2003	Outstanding Special Effects in Service to Visual Effects in a Televised Program, Music Video or Commercial	Thomas L. Bellissimo, Charles Belardinelli	"Milfay" (pilot)	Won
2003	Outstanding Special Effects in Service to Visual Effects in a Televised Program, Music Video or Commercial	Thomas L. Bellissimo	"Dust Storm" (i.e. "Black Blizzard")	Nominated
2003	Outstanding Visual Effects – TV Series	David Altenau, Ariel Velasco-Shaw, Thomas L. Bellissimo, Barbara Marshall	"Milfay" (pilot)	Nominated

== Other awards ==
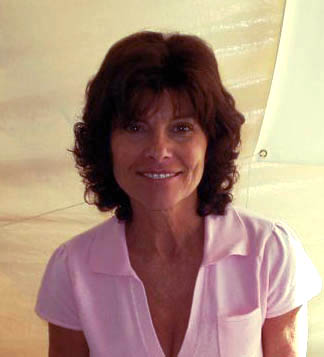
Adrienne Barbeau, who played Ruthie, was the only Carnivàle actor to win an award, The WIN Award (Women's Image Network Award).

Year	Award	Category	Nominee	Episode	Result
2003	Art Directors Guild Award	Excellence in Production Design – Single-Camera Television Series	Bernt Amadeus Capra, Jeremy Cassells	—	Won
2004	Artios Award	Best Casting for TV, Dramatic Pilot	John Papsidera, Wendy O'Brien	—	Won
2003	Eddie Award	Best Edited One-Hour Series for Non-Commercial Television	David Siegel	"Creed, OK"	Nominated
2004	Women's Image Network Award	Best Actress – Episodic Drama Series	Adrienne Barbeau for playing "Ruthie"	"Day of the Dead"	Won
2004	Women's Image Network Award	Episodic Drama Series	—	"Insomnia"	Won
2005	Women's Image Network Award	Drama Series	—	"The Road to Damuscus"	Nominated
2005	Women's Image Network Award	Actress in Drama Series	Clea DuVall	"Ingram, TX"	Nominated
2004	Young Artist Award	Best Performance in a Television Series – Recurring Young Actress	Erin Sanders for playing "young Iris"	—	Nominated
