= List of Carnivàle episodes =

A typical view of the carnival.

Carnivàle is an American fantasy television series created by Daniel Knauf for HBO. The series premiered on September 14, 2003, on HBO and finished its two-season run of 24 episodes on March 27, 2005. Until late in the second season, each episode is split into two distinct but slowly converging storylines taking place in the United States Dustbowl of the mid-1930s. Nick Stahl starred as Ben Hawkins, a young Okie farmer with strange powers who joins a traveling carnival; Clancy Brown played his adversary Brother Justin Crowe, a California preacher who uses his similarly strange abilities to rise to power. Carnivàle was originally intended to run as a trilogy of paired seasons, with each pair being called a "book" and the series as a whole spanning the years from 1934 to 1945, but the series was canceled after two seasons due to low ratings. These two seasons complete the first book covering the years 1934 and 1935. The second book (seasons three and four) would have taken place around the years 1939 and 1940, and the third book (seasons five and six) would have played in 1944 and 1945, leading up to the end of World War II and the explosion at the Trinity test site.

The character of Samson, the diminutive co-manager of the carnival, sets up each season with a monologue, giving glimpses of the show's complex story and good-versus-evil mythology. By telling the story visually and deploying dialogue sparely, Carnivàle is a demanding show with a lot of subtext, and similar to reading chapters of a book, viewers need to watch episodes of Carnivàle in the right order or risk being spoiled with too little or too much story information. Many reviewers found the story too slow and confusing, but praised the show for its cinematography and realistic portrayal of the 1930s. Carnivàle received much award recognition in mostly technical categories, including fifteen Emmy nominations with five wins.

The stops of the carnival throughout the Southwestern United States play a significant part in the show, with many episodes bearing the name of the location of Ben and the carnival. Some stops like Alamogordo, New Mexico are of historical significance; others are fictional. The only episode titled after Brother Justin's location is Season 1's "The River". Both seasons of Carnivàle were filmed in Southern California, with the carnival set being moved to movie ranches and Lancaster. Brother Justin's story in the fictional Mintern, California was shot at Paramount Ranch in Malibu. The permanent filming location of the carnival in Season 2 was Big Sky Ranch, which was also used for Brother Justin's new home in fictional New Canaan. The show's interiors were filmed at Santa Clarita Studios.

== Series overview ==
Season	Episodes	Originally released		Average viewership (in millions)
Season	Episodes	First released	Last released	Average viewership (in millions)
1	12	September 14, 2003	November 30, 2003	3.54
2	12	January 9, 2005	March 27, 2005	1.70

== Episodes ==
=== Season 1 (2003) ===
Before the beginning, after the great war between heaven and hell, God created the Earth and gave dominion over it to the crafty ape he called man… and to each generation was born a Creature of Light and a Creature of Darkness… and great armies clashed by night in the ancient war between good and evil. There was magic then. Nobility. And unimaginable cruelty. And so it was until the day that a false sun exploded over Trinity, and man forever traded away wonder for reason.

No. overall	No. in season	Title	Directed by	Written by	Ben's location	Original release date	U.S. viewers (millions)
1	1	"Milfay"	Rodrigo García	Daniel Knauf	Milfay, Oklahoma	September 14, 2003	5.33
Milfay, Oklahoma Dustbowl, 1934. Ben Hawkins, a young farmer and chain gang fugitive, suffers strange dreams about a trench war and a tattooed man stalking in a cornfield. When Ben buries his mother who had just died from dust pneumonia, a traveling carnival arrives. Ben's house is about to be demolished, and the police are nearing, so the carnival picks him up and provides him shelter. Lodz, the carnival's mentalist, is suspicious of Ben's dreams. Before the carnival leaves to its next location, Ben puts his hands on a lame girl's legs and heals her, laying the surrounding field to waste. Samson, the carnival's co-manager, relays Management's comment about Ben being expected to Jonesy, the carnival's Ferris wheel operator who suffers from a crippling knee injury. Mintern, California.^{[a]} The small town preacher Brother Justin Crowe witnesses an Okie church attendee spew coins during a visit at his home. He also has the same dreams as Ben. In a particular dream, he sees a local Chinese establishment named Chin's where he later visits and has a vision of blood raining on himself and a cross manifesting on the neon signboard. Awards: Emmy for "Outstanding Art Direction for a Single-Camera Series" and "Outstanding Costumes for a Series". VES Award for "Outstanding Special Effects in Service to Visual Effects in a Televised Program, Music Video or Commercial" and nomination for "Outstanding Visual Effects in a Television Series".
2	2	"After the Ball Is Over"	Jeremy Podeswa	Daniel Knauf & Ronald D. Moore	N/A	September 21, 2003	3.49
Ben is slowly setting in as a carnival roustabout. His co-workers make him clean up a mysterious baggage trailer where he finds a photograph of his mother with the inscription "H.S. and FLO". Ben shows it to snake charmer Ruthie, who identifies the woman on the photo as Henry Scudder's sweetheart Flora. Ruthie also hands Ben a photo of Scudder, a man who once worked in the carnival's geek show. Ben recognizes him as a soldier from his dreams. Brother Justin and Ben both have a cryptic dream about a diner with a soldier and Henry Scudder, where a waitress tells them that "every Prophet [is] in his House." Justin wants to turn Chin's into a church for the migrants and appeals to Carol Templeton, the establishment's owner. Templeton does not give in until Justin shows him the true nature of his sins. Awards: Emmy for "Outstanding Hairstyling for a Series".
3	3	"Tipton"	Rodrigo García	Story by : Henry Bromell; Teleplay by : Henry Bromell & Daniel Knauf	Tipton, Missouri	September 28, 2003	3.57
The sheriff of Tipton refuses to let the carnival set up in his town. But after inhabitants identify Ben as the healer of the little girl, Samson opens a revival with the aid of the local church, featuring Ben as the famous Reverend Benjamin St. John. In-between shows, Ben locates an old lady named Rebecca Donovan, the sheriff's mother, whose old trucks reminded him of the baggage trailer photo. Rebecca remarks upon Ben's uncanny resemblance to Henry Scudder and makes cryptic statements about supernatural powers. With her last breath, she tells Ben not to heal her, and reveals that Scudder went to Babylon. Samson lets Jonesy know that Management decided Babylon will be the carnival's next major stop. Brother Justin has turned Chin's into a ministry and orphanage, but Carol's nephew Val Templeton informs him that the building will be torn down soon.
4	4	"Black Blizzard"	Peter Medak	William Schmidt	N/A	October 5, 2003	2.88
While several carnies disapprove of Babylon as the next carnival stop, Lodz takes Ben on a trip and tests the boy's powers. A dust storm approaches, but when Jonesy checks up on Management, he finds his trailer empty. Brother Justin learns from his mentor Norman that he must either comply with the church board's wishes and hand over Chin's to someone else, or face disciplinary actions. Justin expresses his exasperation to his sister Iris, but when Chin's burns down under mysterious circumstances, his worries change. Awards: VES Award nomination for "Outstanding Special Effects in Service to Visual Effects in a Televised Program, Music Video or Commercial".
5	5	"Babylon"	Tim Hunter	Dawn Prestwich & Nicole Yorkin	Babylon, Texas^{[b]}	October 12, 2003	3.31
The carnival sets up in Babylon, and Samson invites the carnies for a party in the ghost town. After drinking too much, Ben wakes up in an abandoned mineshaft and finds AVATAR written on the walls. Sofie, the carnival's Tarot reader, hears Scudder's name from her catatonic mother, and the carnival night ends with a tragic death. Brother Justin prays for the children who died in the ministry fire. Awards: Emmy nomination for "Outstanding Makeup for a Series (Non-Prosthetic)".
6	6	"Pick a Number"	Rodrigo García	Ronald D. Moore	Babylon, Texas^{[b]}	October 19, 2003	3.41
Still in the mineshaft, Ben experiences visions of Scudder, Lodz and a Russian soldier in the trench war. Lodz pressures Ben to tell him about his dreams. After last night's death, Jonesy accuses Samson of pretending Management's existence, and Ben participates in "carnival justice". After Samson has learned of Scudder's past in Babylon, the carnival resumes its journey South. Brother Justin entreats God for answers to the ministry fire and he receives signs to go into the wilderness. He tells campfire strangers that he has lost his God and unknowingly becomes acquainted with Los Angeles radio reporter Tommy Dolan. Awards: Emmy for "Outstanding Cinematography for a Single-Camera Series".
7	7	"The River"	Alison Maclean	Toni Graphia	Texas	October 26, 2003	3.91
Ben learns of Scudder's past with Ruthie and accidentally injures her son Gabriel in a fight. To correct his mistake, Ben heals Gabriel in a lake, killing all fish in the process. Cootch show talker Stumpy Dreifuss is inconsolable over the death of his daughter, while the friendship between his other daughter Libby and Tarot reader Sofie deepens. Following a suicide attempt at a bridge, Brother Justin gets to know two Russian immigrant children, Irina and Alexei. At the same time, Tommy Dolan visits Iris and offers to go public with the mysterious circumstances surrounding the ministry fire. After outwitting councilman Val Templeton in a live radio interview, Dolan learns about Iris's childhood – she and her brother emigrated from Russia and are the only survivors of a train accident.
8	8	"Lonnigan, Texas"	Scott Winant	Daniel Knauf	Lonnigan, Texas	November 2, 2003	2.97
Ben dreams of Justin and the gravely injured Russian soldier. The next morning, he has to run errands for Samson and meets freak-finder Boffo. When shaking hands, Ben comes in contact with Boffo's ring, which induces a powerful series of Knights Templar visions in him. Ben panics and drives off with the ring, but he has to return it to Boffo at the carnival. Samson possesses a medal with the same symbol as the ring; it bears the initials "H.S." on the back. When Samson turns to Management, he finds Lodz in the trailer talking about Scudder and is told to leave. As the relationship between Sofie and Jonesy seems to go nowhere, Jonesy is offered sexual relief with Stumpy's wife Rita Sue. Brother Justin is committed to an insane asylum, where he informs the doctors that he is "the left hand of God" and "His will made flesh". He practices his mind-bending powers on the people in the building.
9	9	"Insomnia"	Jack Bender	William Schmidt	N/A	November 9, 2003	3.42
To supplement the carnival's income, Samson arranges a "fireball show". Ben tries to drive off the torments of his dreams by staying awake. He remains defiant to Lodz's urges to listen to his dreams and learn from them. Samson hands Ben the medal, saying he is the rightful owner as Scudder's son. The medal's significance becomes clear when Lodz touches it and experiences the same strong visions as Ben had with Boffo's ring. When Sofie envisions her mother being raped by a tattooed man, she unburdens her heart to Jonesy and Samson. Iris, who is still in search of Justin, participates in Dolan's radio show but rejects his romantic advances. Brother Justin is released from the mental institution.
10	10	"Hot and Bothered"	Jeremy Podeswa	Dawn Prestwich & Nicole Yorkin	Loving, New Mexico^{[c]}	November 16, 2003	3.20
Ben, whose lack of sleep results in more daydream visions of the Tattooed Man, joins Samson on a trip to Loving. They hope to find more clues at a local brotherhood organization, which bears the symbol of Scudder's trinket. But the manager of the Templar lodge is unwilling to help them, and Ben misses an important clue on a mural. Meanwhile, a Templar tells Sofie about "every Prophet [being] in her House." At night, Lodz taps into Ben's dream and informs Management that Scudder appeared to him in a cornfield. Brother Justin returns to Mintern and asks Iris about the missing pieces of his childhood. At the next church service, Tommy Dolan joins the Crowes and sees Justin unburdening his heart about his dark past in front of the audience. When seeing baptismal water on Justin's forehead transform into blood, Norman grows suspicious of his foster son.
11	11	"Day of the Dead"	John Patterson	Toni Graphia	Loving, New Mexico^{[c]}	November 23, 2003	4.19
While Ben's dark visions about Justin and Scudder continue, Sofie learns of Jonesy's affair with Rita Sue. Lodz organizes Ruthie's death with Management's blessing, and Ben finds himself unable to revive her. As police reports appear about the ministry fire, Iris is forced to confess her guilt to Justin.
12	12	"The Day That Was the Day"	Rodrigo García	Ronald D. Moore	Loving, New Mexico^{[c]}	November 30, 2003	3.53
Sofie schemes for revenge on Jonesy and Libby, and Lodz learns alarming news from Sofie's mother Apollonia. Ben approaches Lodz for help with Ruthie's resurrection and meets Management for the first time. After several hours, Ben still finds himself unable to act on Management's instructional advice and considers suicide, but a vision of Scudder insinuates his destiny as an Avatar. When Lodz's involvement in Ruthie's death becomes clear, Ben kills him, reviving Ruthie in the process. At the same time, Apollonia sets fire to her trailer and risks Sofie's, Jonesy's and her own life. Brother Justin sheds light into Norman's greatest evil but is deeply disturbed to learn that Norman's worst deed was to save him as a boy. A deal with Tommy Dolan allows Justin to hold his first radio speech.

=== Season 2 (2005) ===
On the heels of the skirmish Man foolishly called the war to end all wars, the Dark One sought to elude his destiny… live as a mortal. So he fled across the ocean, to an empire called America… but by his mere presence, a cancer corrupted the spirit of the land. People were rendered mute by fools who spoke many words, but said nothing… for whom oppression and cowardice were virtues… and freedom, an obscenity. Into this dark heartland, the Prophet stalked his enemy… until, diminished by his wounds, he turned to the next in the ancient line of light. And so it was that the fate of all mankind came to rest on the trembling shoulders of the most reluctant of saviors.

— Samson in "Los Moscos"

No. overall	No. in season	Title	Directed by	Written by	Ben's location	Original release date	U.S. viewers (millions)
13	1	"Los Moscos"^{[c]}	Jeremy Podeswa	Daniel Knauf	Loving, New Mexico^{[c]}	January 9, 2005	1.81
After showing Ben an explosion of massive destruction in a desert, Management reveals himself as Lucius Belyakov, the Russian soldier from Ben's dreams. He tells Ben to find Henry Scudder to learn the name of his enemy, the preacher from his dreams. Samson is to further act as their intermediary, and it is his first task to get rid of Lodz's body. Jonesy and Sofie are the only ones to survive the trailer fire; Samson presents Apollonia's burned body to the police, claiming that fugitive Ben was killed in the fire. Meanwhile, Scudder's trinket prompts Ben to revisit the Templar Lodge in Loving, where he learns that Scudder was once involved with chaplain Devin Kerrigan. After meeting in 1923, Kerrigan seemingly lost his mind and painted a tattooed man into a Templar mural; he is now institutionalized in Alamogordo. Brother Justin visits Norman, who after suffering a stroke is unable to speak. On his way home, Justin sees a decrepit tree that he already encountered in a vision about the Tattooed Man and the Usher. Following another vision at the foot of the tree, Justin declares, "this will be my New Canaan.^{[a]} Here, I will build a temple." Wilfred Talbot Smith meets up with Brother Justin in Dolan's radio studio, predicting Justin will become the Prophet and the Usher as soon as he kills a man named Henry Scudder. He then hands Justin the Gospel of Matthias, a Templar book that once belonged to Scudder. Justin's "Church of the Air" radio speech reaches Varlyn Stroud in prison.
14	2	"Alamogordo, NM"	Jack Bender	William Schmidt	Alamogordo, New Mexico^{[d]}	January 16, 2005	1.73
Ben finds Kerrigan in his room covered with drawings of the Tattooed Man, repeating a mantra talking of a crone. On his way back to the carnival, Ben drives past the desert from an earlier vision. He picks up a wandering, disoriented Sofie, accompanied by visions of the Tattooed Man. Sofie finds a new home in Lodz's trailer, but Lodz's former lover, Lila, grows suspicious of his unexplained disappearance. After receiving Kerrigan's poem and one of his drawings, Management informs Ben of the relevance of the Tattooed Man as the Usher, and that they need to find an old lady in Ingram, Texas. Varlyn Stroud, Brother Justin's "archangel made flesh", kills a prison guard and escapes, then sets out to find Henry Scudder. He visits the Hawkins Farm, then proceeds to Tipton. After killing the sheriff, he finds a 1921 letter to Rebecca Donovan from Scudder in Babylon. While Brother Justin breaks ground for his Temple of Jericho near the decrepit tree, Dolan collects evidence tying Iris to the ministry fire. Justin gets his chest and back tattooed with a tree. Awards: Emmy nomination for "Outstanding Makeup for a Series (Non-Prosthetic)".
15	3	"Ingram, TX"	John Patterson	John J. McLaughlin	Ingram, Texas	January 23, 2005	N/A
Sofie abandons her job as a fortune teller and takes on manual labor, which incurs the resentment of the male rousties. Money problems, compounded by Stumpy's gambling habit, force the Dreifuss family to work harder. Ruthie sees apparitions of Lodz repeatedly. Ben learns the route to the crone from a tramp, but gets lost in a forest and is apprehended by a family of roughnecks, who torture and begin to bury him alive. However, Scudder's trinket saves him from death. Stroud arrives in Babylon and learns that Scudder was the only man to survive the 1921 mine cave-in. Larger crowds of followers arrive at the Temple of Jericho. Justin sexually abuses the new maid in the presence of Norman, who has been transferred to the Crowes' home for caretaking.
16	4	"Old Cherry Blossom Road"	Steve Shill	Dawn Prestwich & Nicole Yorkin	Ingram, Texas	January 30, 2005	N/A
The locals bring Ben to Emma "The Crone" Krohn, mother of Henry Scudder, and their and Ben's grandmother. Ben learns about the grisly fate of his relatives, and finds his father's death mask. Before Ben departs, Emma gives him a trench knife, explaining that he will need it where he is going, a place "where the dog and the wolf howl at the moon." Jonesy sympathizes with Sofie as the only female among the roustabouts, but cannot prevent Rita Sue from noticing his growing affection for Libby. Ruthie repeatedly sees Apollonia in burned clothes. After visiting the Templar Lodge in Loving, Stroud learns that a boy and a midget asked about Scudder. Dolan confronts Justin with evidence of Iris's guilt, but Justin refuses to accept his findings. The Crowes get a new maid. Awards: Emmy co-nomination for "Outstanding Art Direction for a Single-Camera Series".
17	5	"Creed, OK"	Jeremy Podeswa	Tracy Tormé	Creed, Oklahoma	February 6, 2005	1.10
The address carved on Scudder's death mask leads Ben to Evander Geddes in Creed, Oklahoma. After an unsettling experience in Geddes' workshop, Ben leaves with the knowledge that Scudder is still alive. At the carnival, Ruthie approaches Sofie about her experiences with dead people, and Sofie starts seeing apparitions of her mother. Stroud enters the fair grounds and antagonizes Jonesy about the safety of the Ferris Wheel, while Samson tries to deflect Stroud by directing him to another carnival, the Daily Brothers Show. Late at night, Sofie gives Ben a card reading, inducing visions of Scudder in a tuxedo, a man scarred beyond recognition, and a location where a dog and a wolf howl at the moon. After looking through Samson's photo album, Ben recognizes the location as Damascus, Nebraska. Dolan collects final evidence that Iris has something to hide. After a talk with her brother, Iris lets Dolan transcribe her confession about the ministry fire. Justin receives a mask of Ben by mail.
18	6	"The Road to Damascus"	Tucker Gates	Dawn Prestwich & Nicole Yorkin	N/A	February 13, 2005	1.50
On the road to Damascus, the carnival crosses paths with surviving members of the burned-down Daily Brothers Show. They suspect the former owners to have laid the fire, not knowing that Stroud instigated the crime and murdered the Dailey brothers. Felix admits his continued money problems to Rita Sue and gets into a fight with Jonesy over Libby. Lila has a strange encounter with Ruthie reminding her of Lodz. Ben and Sofie, who spent all day with each other, get intimate. After Ben drives off to pursue Stroud, the carnival heads for its next location, leaving Sofie behind. Stroud exploits the idea that "the best way to follow someone is to get ahead of them." Preparations are made for Iris's public confession, but in a mysterious twist, Dolan is deceived into a public confession for the crime, and he is arrested as the culprit. Awards: Emmy nominations for "Outstanding Cinematography for a Single-Camera Series" and "Outstanding Costumes for a Series".
19	7	"Damascus, NE"	Alan Taylor	Story by : William Schmidt; Teleplay by : John J. McLaughlin	Damascus, Nebraska	February 20, 2005	N/A
While Sofie's absence is the topic of speculation at the carnival, Jonesy and Libby passionately consummate their mutual attraction. Ben locates Scudder's old hotel room in Damascus, where he has visions of a man acid-burning his face. Ben locates this man near the reception area and heals him, revealing Scudder. They elude Stroud and head to the carnival, where Scudder is violently coerced by Management into identifying Ben's enemy as Alexei Belyakov, Management's son. When Management attacks Scudder in rage, Ben comes to his father's aid and stabs Management repeatedly with his grandmother's trench knife. Brother Justin has visions of approaching death as somehow correlated with a Ferris wheel. An ambulance takes away another of the Crowes' maids who they claim has "a case of bad nerves." During a public radio broadcast, Brother Justin tears up a pre-approved sermon and improvises an incendiary jeremiad that indicts his superiors. Awards: Emmy nomination for "Outstanding Prosthetic Makeup for a Series, Miniseries, Movie or a Special". Emmy co-nomination for "Outstanding Art Direction for a Single-Camera Series".
20	8	"Outskirts, Damascus, NE"	Tim Hunter	Daniel Knauf	Damascus, Nebraska	February 27, 2005	N/A
As Management draws his last breath, he teaches Ben the right way for the blade to enter the tree. Ben explains to Samson why he had to kill Management, that he now possesses Management's knowledge, and that he knows about Stroud's intentions and his link to the Usher. At first Samson is furious and accuses Ben of killing his friend. However, after Ruthie claims that seeing Scudder and a bald-headed man the previous night is further evidence that she sees dead people, Samson begins to understand that Ben is telling the truth. Ruthie rejects Lila's approaches about her supposed sleepwalking. The Dreifuss family faces new troubles with Libby's marriage to Jonesy, and an attempt to sort out their problems with a family dinner ends in an argument. That night, a Ferris wheel accident kills a young boy and injures his mother. When Samson sees Ben transfer the mother's life to her child, Ben gains Samson's trust and instructs the carnival to head west in search of Scudder and Stroud. At the moment of Management's death, Justin has a seizure, which Wilfred Talbot Smith explains as Justin's enemy receiving his boon. Justin approaches councilman Templeton to participate in his Sermon on the Mount for a New America. The Crowes hire a new maid – Sofie.
21	9	"Lincoln Highway"^{[e]}	Rodrigo García	William Schmidt	Lincoln Highway, Wyoming^{[e]}	March 6, 2005	1.96
Although the carnival has safely crossed the border to Wyoming, Jonesy and Libby are kidnapped by a group of men out to avenge the Ferris wheel death of the wife. They tar and feather Jonesy, and leave him and Libby in the desert. The next morning, Ben locates Stroud and Scudder using astral projection and heads to Cheyenne. On the road, he encounters Libby waving for help. To save the life of Jonesy, Ben needs to use his healing powers; while doing so, he unintentionally mends Jonesy's bad knee. Ruthie's irritations grow after she wakes up and finds the words "Sofie is the Omega -L" on her mirror. Lila keeps close watch on her. Iris overhears Justin talking to stroke-afflicted Norman about his childhood nightmares: A carnival is approaching, hiding his enemy. After Eleanor confides to Iris that she saw the devil in Justin's eyes, Iris takes her to a lake and murders her. Iris arrives late for Templeton's declaration of Congress candidacy. Norman grabs a policeman's gun and shoots at Justin, but misses. Justin shocks the crowd with forgiveness, but Iris finds a new ally in her plot against Justin. Awards: Emmy nominations for "Outstanding Music Composition for a Series (Dramatic Underscore)" and "Outstanding Cinematography for a Single-Camera Series".
22	10	"Cheyenne, WY"	Todd Field	Tracy Tormé	Cheyenne, Wyoming	March 13, 2005	2.50
Jonesy and Ben leave Libby with the carnival and drive to the motel of Ben's vision, only to find that Stroud has already left with the abducted Scudder. Ben recognizes the preacher of his dreams (Justin) in a newspaper article, and pays the motel clerk to deliver the newspaper to Samson. Ben and Jonesy leave for New Canaan. Ruthie/Lodz pays Lila a midnight visit and tells her the circumstances surrounding the death of Lodz. Libby tries to explain to her mother the story of Jonesy's healing, but Rita Sue is dismissive. Samson tells the carnies to pack up. Stroud delivers Scudder to Justin, but Wilfred Talbot Smith intervenes before Justin kills Scudder, explaining that the drugged Scudder's mind must be clear to pass on the boon. Stroud increases security with his armed Knights of Jericho. Iris recognizes her niece in Sofie. To disrupt the emerging alliance of Iris and Norman, Justin assigns Norman's caretaking to Sofie. Scudder breaks his bondage, murders Smith, and escapes in Stroud's car. However, Justin who was hiding in the back seat, emerges and decapitates Scudder.
23	11	"Outside New Canaan"	Dan Lerner	Story by : John J. McLaughlin; Teleplay by : Dawn Prestwich & Nicole Yorkin	New Canaan, California^{[a]}	March 20, 2005	N/A
Despite the risk of detection, Ben does not want to miss a chance to kill his enemy and so remains at New Canaan while Jonesy returns to the carnival for assistance. Lila instigates a mutiny over Samson and a seemingly nonexistent Management. However, when Jonesy shows his healed knee, he gains the carnies' support for Ben's mission, and the caravan leaves for an arranged setup in New Canaan. Iris encounters Ben in Justin's bedroom armed with an axe. She convinces Ben to surrender the axe, and directs him to a baptism taking place at the lake. During the baptism ceremony, the body of the murdered Eleanor floats by. Ben spots Sofie and tries to warn her of Justin's evil nature, but she refuses to believe him. However, when she overhears the Crowes conversing in Russian and discovers Ben's broken mask in a drawer, she becomes suspicious. Justin attempts to seduce her during a thunderstorm, but Sofie rejects his advances. Awards: Emmy nomination for "Outstanding Hairstyling for a Series". Emmy co-nomination for "Outstanding Art Direction for a Single-Camera Series".
24	12	"New Canaan, CA"	Scott Winant	Story by : Tracy Tormé; Teleplay by : Daniel Knauf	New Canaan, California^{[a]}	March 27, 2005	2.40
After hearing how Ben's powers work, Samson devises a grand plan. Libby and Jonesy have an open talk about his feelings for Sofie, and Iris confesses her sins to Norman. Meanwhile, Stroud locks Sofie in an abandoned barn after she saw Justin's tattooed chest and insulted him. Sofie experiences a series of visions of her carny past, of Justin, the Tattooed Man, Lodz's words to her mother, and finally of herself with Justin's black eyes saying, "this is your House." Jonesy, Ben and Samson hope to abduct Sofie from Justin's property, but when Samson and his carnies arrive to receive Iris's honorarium, they encounter Justin and Stroud. As Samson denies knowing a "Sofie", Stroud informs Justin of the obvious setup. Supported by many carnies, Ben's and Brother Justin's first and the series' final battle takes place on and near the carnival grounds. As Justin and Iris mount the Ferris wheel for a long ride, Ben begins to perform a mass-healing act as Benjamin St. John. After crumbling in pain and ripping his shirt open for everyone to see, Justin stops the Ferris wheel and enters Ben's tent. He pulls out the sickle that already killed Scudder, lacerates several devotees and Norman standing in his way, and pursues Ben into a cornfield. Justin cuts Ben on the arm and abdomen, and Ben's blade breaks apart. With Justin towering over him ready to carry out his last task, Ben remembers Management's words, grabs his broken blade and plunges it deep into Justin's tattooed chest where the branches meet. Meanwhile, Jonesy has tracked Stroud to Sofie's place, overpowers him and releases her, but Sofie shoots Jonesy down. The next morning, the carnies find Brother Justin with Emma's blade in his chest and bring Ben, still breathing, back to their camp. Stumpy and Rita Sue, whose outstanding debts are now covered by Iris's honorarium, reassure Libby that Jonesy will soon return. In the meantime, Sofie approaches Justin and places her hands on his chest. As Iris sees the corn die around them, the carnival leaves New Canaan with Ben's unconscious body bouncing in Management's bed... (see also Characters of Carnivàle: Season 2 finale and character fates).

== Location notes ==
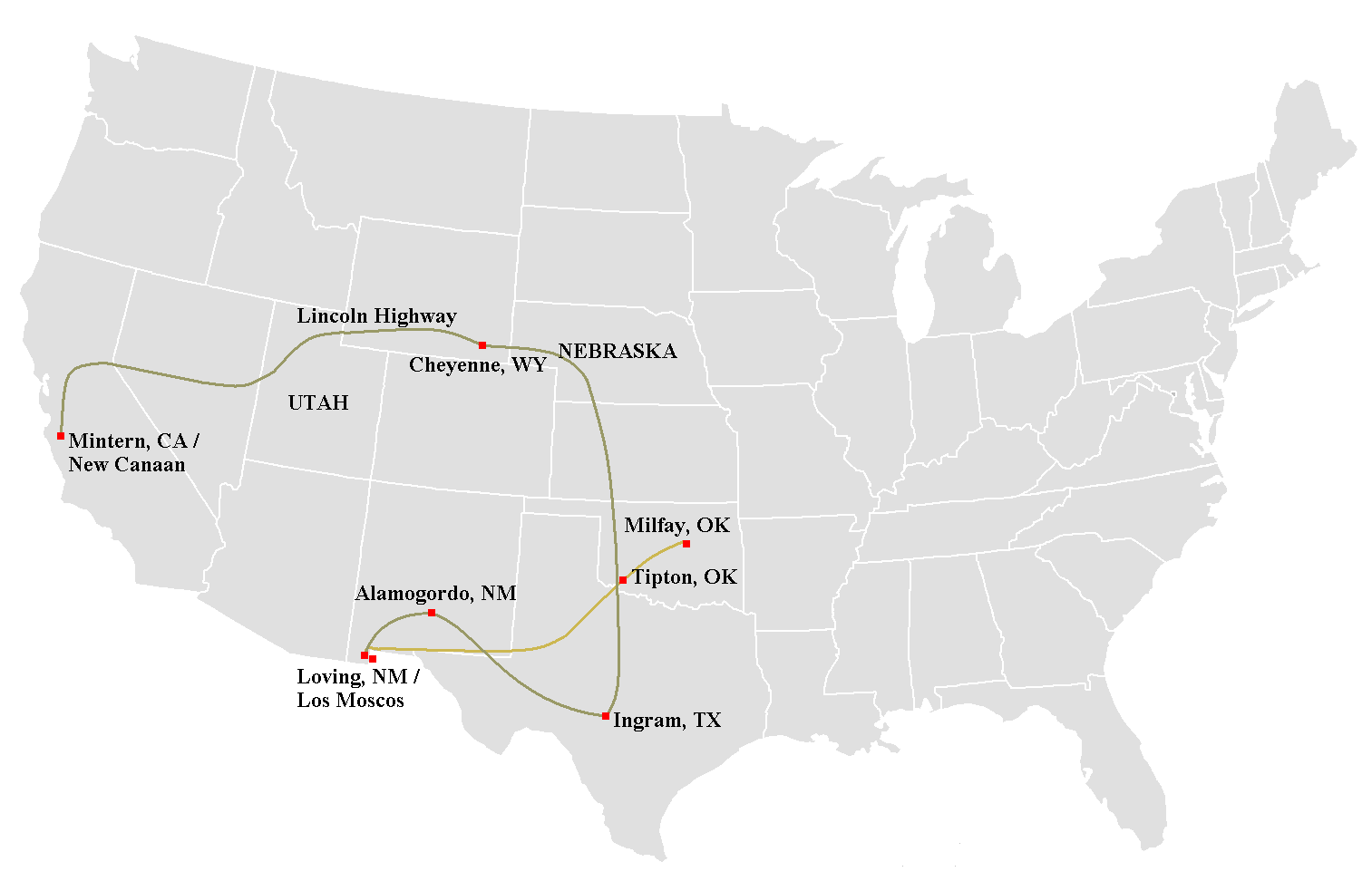
Carnival stops.

a. ^ ^{a} ^{b} ^{c} ^{d} Mintern is a fictional town in the San Joaquin Valley in San Benito County, California, near Salinas. When Brother Justin loses his faith in God in the middle of Season 1, he leaves his Mintern home and heads for the San Joaquin Valley wilderness near Kingsburg. After visiting Norman in the hospital early in Season 2, Brother Justin and Iris head home and pass a tree; Justin names this location "New Canaan", the future site of his temple. New Canaan is also located in San Benito County, California, south of Salinas. The last Season 2 episode is named "New Canaan, CA" on DVDs.

b. ^ ^{a} ^{b} Babylon is a fictional town in Texas. It became a ghost town after a cave-in in 1921 killed all miners but Scudder. There is a historical reference to a real Babylon, Texas located in Navarro County.

c. ^ ^{a} ^{b} ^{c} ^{d} ^{e} Los Moscos is a real area in Chihuahua, Mexico, near the southwest U.S. New Mexico border, but its significance as the name of the first season 2 episode is never clarified. It is however established that Ben and the carnival spend most of their time in Loving, New Mexico during this and the previous episodes. Carnivàle suggests that Loving does not refer to Loving, New Mexico in the southeast of the state, near Texas, since the (fictional) town is said to be less than a mile from the Mexican border in the Western part of New Mexico, thematically and geographically likely close to Los Moscos.

d. Alamogordo, New Mexico was the headquarters of the Trinity site, where humankind's first nuclear test took place in 1945. Ben's vision of the atomic bomb takes place in a desert nearby, ten years before the nuclear explosion would actually occur.

e. ^ ^{a} ^{b} Lincoln Highway is the first road across America, conceived in 1912. During the episode, the carnival rests in Wyoming close to the Nebraska border, but the episode is misleadingly called "Lincoln Highway, UT" on DVDs.
