= Characters of Carnivàle =

List of characters in an HBO series

Promotional photograph of the Carnivàle cast. From left to right, front row (character names): Lodz, Lila, Libby, Caladonia and Alexandria, Apollonia, Sofie, Ben Hawkins, Gabriel, Iris, Brother Justin; back row: Dora Mae, Rita Sue, Stumpy, Ruthie, Gecko, Samson.

There are several main characters in Carnivàle, an American television serial drama set in the United States Depression-era Dust Bowl between 1934 and 1935. It aired on HBO from 2003 to 2005. It follows the disparate storylines of an ensemble of characters, with the two central characters of Ben Hawkins, a young man working in a traveling carnival; and Brother Justin Crowe, a Californian preacher.

Carnivàle has a large cast, with eighteen regular actors over its two-season run. Most of them are introduced in Ben's storyline: Samson, a little person co-running the carnival with an individual known only as Management; Jonesy, Samson's right-hand man with a crippling knee injury; Apollonia and Sofie, two fortunetellers working a mother-daughter act; Lodz, a blind mentalist, and his lover, Lila the Bearded Lady; "the Dreifuss family striptease act"; the snake charmer Ruthie and her son Gabriel, a strongman; and many other sideshow performers. The supporting characters of Brother Justin's storyline are his sister Iris, his mentor Reverend Norman Balthus, the radio show host Tommy Dolan, and the convict Varlyn Stroud. Several characters appear in mysterious dreams and visions, connecting the slowly converging storylines.

Show creator Daniel Knauf's original story pitch to HBO included elaborate character biographies, which he gave to the actors, the writers and the studio as an overview of the series' intended plot. These biographies were rewritten before the filming of the first season began. Receiving little to no mention in the series afterwards, the original character backgrounds were summarized on the official HBO website. After the show's cancellation, the writers revealed future character arcs and forwarded all original biographies to fans as part of the show's so-called "Pitch Document". Due to their nature, these sources do not offer canonical information as such but provide a frame for the characters' motivation throughout the series.

The thematic and period setting of Carnivàle required an unusual casting approach. While some actors were hired for their genetic disabilities, most actors were specifically cast for their unique and distinct looks to fit the series' 1930s setting. Award-winning costumes and make-up enhanced the illusion. Reviews generally lauded the actors and characters, and several actors received awards for their performances.

== Conception ==
Conceiving the initial script for Carnivàle between 1990 and 1992, Daniel Knauff set its plot in a carnival environment in the 1930s Dust Bowl, which he felt had not been dramatized as a series yet. He had grown up with a disabled father who was not commonly accepted as a normal human being. Freaks of the 1930s, however, who may not have found another place offering a future outside of a carnival, tended to be celebrities in the period. Daniel Knauf expanded the plot with a complex fictional universe based on a good versus evil theme, led by carnival healer Ben Hawkins and Brother Justin Crowe, a California preacher. In his story pitch to HBO, Knauf presented Carnivàle as a collection of media samples from the perspective of a fictional author trying to uncover Ben's mysterious story. These fictional samples consisted of interviews, diary entries, and various newspaper clippings, photos and book references forming the character biographies of all major Carnivàle characters. The character backgrounds were further developed before the filming of Carnivàle began but were not made part of the show's visible structure. The audience would therefore only get to know the characters as a natural aspect in the story. The characters themselves are confronted with "self-realization and becoming aware of these [supernatural] powers and learning to harness them, and the implications of this battle between good and evil." Seventeen actors received star billing in the first season; fifteen of whom were part of the carnival storyline. The second season amounted to thirteen main cast members, supplemented by several actors in recurring roles. Although such large casts make shows more expensive to produce, the writers have more flexibility in story decisions.

== Ben Hawkins ==
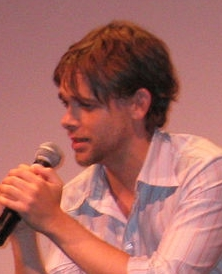
Nick Stahl played Ben Hawkins

- Played by Nick Stahl, Ryan Hanson Bradford (as child) – Further information: Genealogy, and season 2 finale and character fates

Ben Krohn Hawkins is the protagonist in Carnivàle. He begins the story as a young Oklahoma farmer and chain gang fugitive who is picked up by a traveling carnival when his mother dies. Ben has displayed inexplicable healing powers since childhood, and with the beginning of the series, he has begun to suffer dreams and visions of people unknown to him. As Ben learns from staying with the carnival, he seems to be related to Henry Scudder, a man who once worked at the carnival. He also learns that his powers come with a price – to give life, he must take life; to raise the dead, he must deliberately kill someone else. When the beginning of season two makes the mysterious happenings in the carnival clearer, Ben is told to find the preacher of his dreams to prevent an unfolding chain of catastrophic events. Henry Scudder, at this point revealed to be Ben's father, allegedly knows the preacher's name, and after a number of near misses and harrowing encounters, Ben is able to bring Scudder before the carnival's Management. A fight ensues in which Ben is forced to kill Management, leaving him a full understanding of his powers. Season two concludes with Ben's setting out to confront Brother Justin in California, where they finally meet in battle in a cornfield. The carnies find Brother Justin slain and Ben passed out from his own grievous wounds. They take Ben back to their camp and leave New Canaan.

=== Background and development ===
As his powers and use of powers already suggest in the series, Ben is an Avataric Creature of Light. An early draft of Carnivàle, which consisted of diary entries by Benjamin "Ben" Hawkins, summarized his childhood as growing up on a run-down farm with his mother and grandfather in the belief that his father had died in World War I. After both his grandfather and mother had died from cancer, he was "shanghaied by a group of carnies" in 1930. In a later version closer to the actual series, Ben left his mother's farm at age sixteen and fell into a criminal life in Texas. After receiving a twenty-year sentence in a state prison-farm for a failed bank robbery, Ben planned his escape to return home to his sick mother, but he accidentally killed a prison guard who drew a gun on him. Show creator Daniel Knauf gave the latter as Ben's chain gang background in the series.

The writers always intended Ben to be the leading man and hero of the series, and were looking for an actor to showcase a youthful, innocent and anti-hero quality. Of the many actors auditioning, the producers found that Nick Stahl brought a "particular introspection" to the character, "project[ing] a great deal of sensitivity, of quiet intelligence, of pain." They also felt that his seemingly little-trained physique worked well for the 1930s period. Nick Stahl, who interpreted Ben as "very stoic", "very quiet", with a "dual nature" and a "real internal struggle going on", embraced this role as a personal challenge.

=== Reception ===
In reviewing the first three episodes, The New York Times commented that "Ben is a taciturn hero, and Mr. Stahl does a remarkable job of wordlessly conveying his character's moods and yearnings, as well as his ungainly grace." The Boston Globe regarded "Stahl, with his watchful eyes, [as] one of the show's strengths. He has a boyish face, but the grim expression of a worn-out elder", and the Seattle Post-Intelligencer said Stahl "speaks volumes with his eyes and weary frown, so much so that his understated portrayal almost carries the series." In a season 1 DVD review, DVD Talk thought that "as the two leads, Nick Stahl and Clancy Brown are nothing short of brilliant. Ben Hawkins is a very isolated and quiet character, and yet he carries a significant part of the series on his shoulders. Without the right actor it could be disastrous, but Stahl brings a level of thoughtful emotion to the character such that a glance or a stare speaks volumes." DVDverdict felt in a season 2 review that "both Nick Stahl and Clancy Brown deliver perfect performances. Stahl's gradual acceptance of his own power, and his subsequent struggle, are fascinating."

For his portrayal of Ben Hawkins, Nick Stahl was nominated for a 2003 Saturn Award in the category "Best Supporting Actor in a Television Series". He was also nominated for a 2003 Golden Satellite Award in the category "Best Performance by an Actor in a Series, Drama".

== Brother Justin Crowe ==
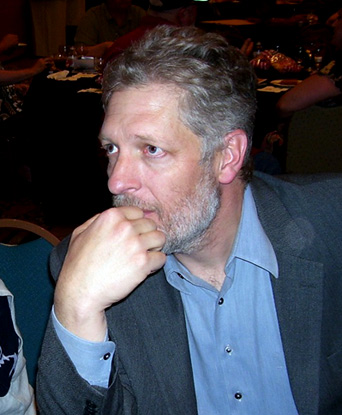
Clancy Brown played Brother Justin

- Played by Clancy Brown, Jamie Kaler (as young man), Jordan Orr (as child, Alexei Belyakov), Don Swayze (Tattooed Man) – Further information: Genealogy, and season 2 finale and character fates

Brother Justin Crowe is the antagonist in Carnivàle; reviewers also saw in him a possible alternate protagonist. Brother Justin is introduced as a Methodist minister who resides with his sister Iris in the small town of Mintern, California. As the series reveals in later episodes, Justin's birth name is Alexei Belyakov. He and his sister Iris are orphaned immigrant children in the wilderness, who were found and raised by Reverend Norman Balthus. Following strange visions and supernatural abilities in the pilot episode, Brother Justin erects a church in his God's name. But after a fire in his new ministry leads him almost to suicide, Brother Justin is hospitalized in a sanatorium and discovers his ability to manipulate and control those around him through sheer force of will. Shortly after Brother Justin's return to Mintern, Norman suspects his foster son to be possessed by a demon and confronts him, but Brother Justin is not disturbed by his true nature for long. In the beginning of season 2, Brother Justin has begun to gather a huge flock of worshippers of mostly migrants and Okies outside Mintern via his nightly radio sermons and newfound abilities of persuasion. A scholar named Wilfred Talbot Smith identifies him as the Usher and tells him that, to gain his full measure of power and fulfill his destiny, he must find and kill a man named Henry Scudder. While escaped convict Varlyn Stroud helps Brother Justin, the Crowes find a new chambermaid in ex-carny Sofie, not knowing that she is Brother Justin's daughter. Brother Justin at long last meets his adversary, Ben, in the final episode of the series. Brother Justin is killed in a battle in a cornfield near his home, but Sofie as the Omega arrives and places her hands on his chest, causing the corn stalks around them to wither and fall away.

=== Background and development ===
Besides being the Usher, Brother Justin is also an Avataric Creature of Dark. His spiritual presentation in the series, the Tattooed Man, was portrayed by Don Swayze. Daniel Knauf saw in Brother Justin "one of the most complex devils", and envisioned Christopher Walken to play him when he wrote the first draft of the show. Knauf originally designed Brother Justin as a preacher far along in his career as well as a recurring instead of a regular character, "much more evolved towards the dark side." An early draft of Carnivàle gave Brother Justin's real name as Lucius Crowe, a radio preacher who advocated ethnic hatred, especially for Gypsies and carnival folk. It also mentioned Brother Justin joining "The Order of the Knights of Jericho" between 1921 and 1923 and becoming its head in 1926. The completion of the construction of his "Temple of Jericho" was set in Nebraska in 1928. At the series' start initially projected to occur in 1930, the character had already gathered a great army of followers through his "Church of the Air" radio sermons.

After seeing the preliminary pilot episode, however, Knauf and the producers realized there was no room for the character to grow in a television series. They demoted Brother Justin to an ordinary Christian minister in a little town, but when Brother Justin's affiliation needed to be decided, Knauf contested plans to make him a Catholic priest; he rather settled on the Methodist denomination, which he perceived as significantly less suspicious and controversial. Although Brother Justin shares traits with Father Coughlin, an Irish Catholic priest who broadcast his sermons over the radio in the 1930s, the writers never tried to retell that particular story.

The producers added Justin's sister Iris as a supporting character in the revised series, and established a sexual tension between the two characters early on. While reviewers were unsure what to make of it, Daniel Knauf advertised the relationship as "just as warped and incestuous as ever" in the new season. Clancy Brown (Brother Justin) and Amy Madigan (Iris) acknowledged the lust between their characters but assumed their relationship had not been consummated in the first season. They were not in favor of their characters getting together like HBO had wanted, as "that's really not what they're about." Per Brown, the sibling relationship informs Brother Justin's and Iris's character and motives, and continued tension frightens the audience more if it is never resolved. Although Brown and Madigan wanted to leave the status of their characters' relationship as lovers open, they deliberately played their kisses more intimate and familiar than most people would consider comfortable. Several characters intervene in the siblings' relationship during the show's run. The writers had planned a sexual innuendo between Iris and Tommy Dolan, a news reporter who investigates in the arson case, but Robert Knepper (Dolan) later felt his character might just have been a pawn between Brother Justin and Iris as siblings, making Brother Justin jealous. The Crowes also regularly hire new maids, which Knauf explained as Iris lining up surrogate women to relieve Brother Justin's sexual pressure.

=== Reception ===
In reviewing the first three episodes, The New York Times saw in "prim, righteous Brother Justin ... more of a caricature, but Clancy Brown finds ways to bring some subtle glints of personality to the role." Time commented, "Brother Justin comes across as a typical whited sepulcher – if there's one thing more trite than a dwarf in a surreal drama, it's a preacher with a dark side – and Brown's campy performance largely involves shouting 'Enough!' and 'No-o-o-o!' with horror-flick pathos." Entertainment Weekly considered Brown's Brother Justin "delightfully unsettling as the creepy evangelist taking his orders from the wrong superpower", and Variety thought Brown was doing "a superb job straddling the line between stoic and menacing, and there are hints about his weaknesses, conveyed quickly with subtlety." A season 1 DVD review by DVD Talk saw Clancy Brown's performance as "nothing short of brilliant. ... Brown also has a difficult task capturing the duality of Brother Justin, a man who presents a physically intimidating presence but who wants little more than to be a subdued and loyal servant of his Lord, and he succeeds on every level." DVDverdict stated in a season 2 review that "Brown's presence and charisma is dazzling; he is both likable and frightening. He is an actor with a great deal of range, and he uses all of it in this series." Referring to Brown's portrayal as "a man of God in Carnivale", the Los Angeles Times saw Brown's "eyes always betray[ing] him as someone who, all things considered, would probably be happier caving in your skull and smoking a cigarette afterward than talking to you for another minute." Time's James Poniewozik depicted the Boardwalk Empire character Nelson Van Alden (played by Michael Shannon) as "such a histrionic, guilt-wracked, damnation-obsessed monster that he reminds me of Brother Justin".

== Affiliated with Ben Hawkins ==
=== Samson ===
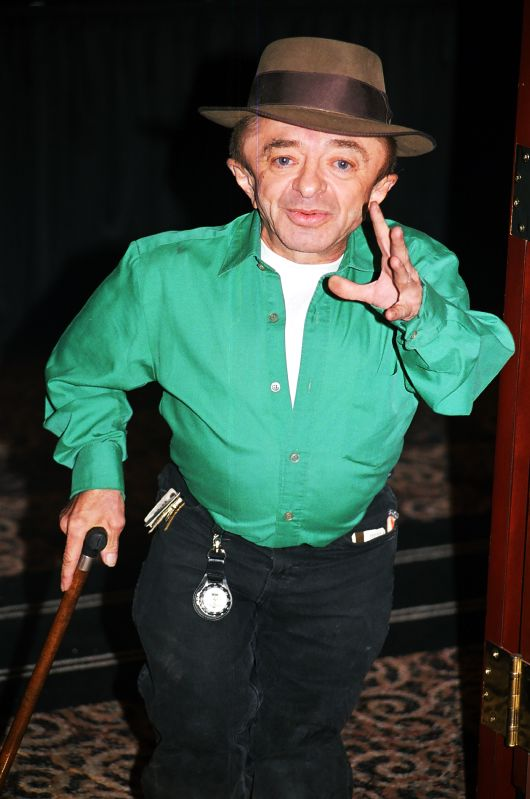
Anderson at CarnyCon, 2006

- Played by Michael J. Anderson (seasons 1–2 main cast)

Samson, in earlier drafts also called Edgar Leiber or Edgar Leonhardt, is the dwarf co-manager of the Carnivàle. His original biography gave his background as a dwarf strongman who started his career in 1904. Eight years later, he started working on traveling carnivals, including the Hyde & Teller Company. Samson's wit elevated him from performer to general manager until another character, Management, purchased the carnival (to be renamed Carnivàle) and briefly gave Samson's job to Lodz, a blind mentalist. The beginning of the series shows Samson delegating Management's orders to the carnies. Samson temporarily loses his position to Lodz for a second time near the end of the first season but retains Management's trust. The death of Management in season 2 leads to Samson's secret deal with Ben to make the boy the new commander of the carnival.

=== Jonesy ===
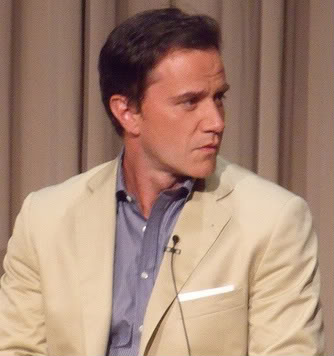
DeKay played Jonesy

- Played by Tim DeKay (seasons 1–2 main cast) – Further information: Season 2 finale and character fates

Clayton "Jonesy" Jones is an ex-baseball player who suffers from a crippling knee injury. He is Samson's right-hand man, operator of the Ferris wheel, and the leader of the roustabouts. Jonesy's original biography reveals his past as a star pitcher in the major league whose knee was injured in revenge when he refused to throw a game for the mob. Slipping to the edge of society, Jonesy joined the Carnivàle and found redemption in the eyes of young Sofie. The two became inseparable until Sofie grew into a woman, making their relationship awkward. At the beginning of the series, Jonesy is faced with Sofie avoiding his advances. While she retreats into a friendship with cootch dancer Libby Dreifuss, Jonesy finds sexual relief with Libby's mother Rita Sue. When Sofie begins to show interest in him, he breaks off his relationship with Rita Sue; however, the fact that he was sleeping with her (and that Libby knew about it) causes Sofie to break both of their hearts as pay back. After this Jonesy remains cold towards her yet finds new affection in Libby. The two eventually elope. Jonesy is kidnapped, tortured and left for dead by a man who had lost his wife in a Ferris wheel accident. Ben is able to heal Jonesy including his crippled knee, and Jonesy joins Ben on his last mission. In the series' final minutes, Jonesy and Sofie meet again, and she shoots him in cold blood.

=== Sofie and Apollonia ===
- Sofie played by Clea DuVall, Lilli Babb (as child) (seasons 1–2 main cast) – Further information: Genealogy · Season 2 finale and character fates
- Apollonia played by Diane Salinger, Elizabeth Kate (as young woman) (season 1 main cast, season 2 recurring) – Further information: Genealogy

Apollonia and Sofie Agnesh Bojakshiya are fortunetellers in a mother-daughter act at the carnival. Although Apollonia is catatonic, she and Sofie can communicate telepathically. Their original biographies declare Apollonia a "once renowned seer who read cards for the rich and famous" and "the only psychic Houdini was unable to debunk." A series of seizures during Sofie's birth in 1913 was given as reason for Apollonia's state. Apollonia's sister cared for her until Sofie was old enough to take over, and they began working the traveling circuits shortly afterwards. It remains unknown until late in season 2 that Sofie is the Omega, although the character's importance for the show's mythology is suggested much earlier. When the series starts with Ben joining the carnival, Apollonia can no longer shield Sofie from her own true self. Sofie begins to evade and rebel against her mother's mental control, but Apollonia counters by first trying to drive Sofie to suicide, then by attempting to kill her in a trailer fire at the end of the first season. Jonesy rescues Sofie, but Apollonia dies. Nevertheless, season 2 shows Apollonia repeatedly appearing to Sofie and snake charmer Ruthie. Sofie tries to leave her fortuneteller life behind by becoming a roustabout. After a short-lived relationship with Ben, Sofie leaves the carnival altogether and becomes the Crowes' maid in California. Brother Justin introduces her to the world of religion, but several signs suggest the preacher is not the good man Sofie thought. After berating Brother Justin in the final episode, Sofie is locked in a barn where visions insinuate her as the Omega and Brother Justin as her father. She later shoots Jonesy, and her eyes have taken on the coal-black appearance of Brother Justin's eyes. The final minutes of the series show Sofie finding Brother Justin dead in a cornfield. She lays her hands on his chest, and the corn around them dies.

=== Lodz ===
- Played by Patrick Bauchau (season 1 main cast, season 2 recurring)

Professor Ernst Lodz is a blind mentalist. As revealed both in the show and in his original biography, he has a long history with the Carnivàle. Lodz's character arc starts with Ben joining the carnival. Lodz unsuccessfully hassles the boy to work with him and to listen to his dreams. He later initiates Ruthie's death with Management's blessing to get his sight back. Upon finding out these circumstances, Ben strangles Lodz to death, reviving Ruthie in the process. Nevertheless, Lodz repeatedly appears to Ruthie and leaves her the message "Sofie is the Omega" on a mirror. Using Ruthie's body, Lodz also visits his lover Lila and informs her about the events leading to his death and "you'll be seeing me soon ... in the flesh." Lodz's final appearance as Ruthie was not supposed to be his last. According to Clancy Brown (Brother Justin), the writers had originally planned Lodz's return as a mummy after a man sold his desiccated body to the carnies. Lodz's demise in season 1 however was planned from the beginning. Besides serving a purpose to the story, it should indicate all bets are off for the other characters.

=== Lila ===
- Played by Debra Christofferson (seasons 1–2 main cast)

Lila Villanueva, also known as the Bearded Lady of Brussels, is the lover of Lodz and the dressmaker of the carnival. Lila's original biography states she was born into the Villanueva circus family in Terrebonne Parish, Louisiana in 1890. The family traveled the international circuit as the "Flying Villalobos" until misfortune struck. One of Lila's two older brothers died in Copenhagen in 1905, and her father committed suicide in 1908. At age sixteen, Lila already sported a beard and married for the first time. The marriage did not last long, and Lila would marry over nineteen more times in her life. Lodz would be her only true love. Lila's arc of the first season is limited to being with Lodz until she notices his growing contact with Management. His sudden disappearance at the beginning of season 2 however makes her suspicious. Samson's subsequent evasive behavior suggests external forces, but Lila finds herself unable to obtain proof. Ruthie repeatedly approaches Lila at night, seemingly possessed by Lodz, and leaves her clues. When Lila finally learns of the circumstances surrounding Lodz's death, she suborns the carnival crew to a mutiny that almost prevents the troupe from meeting with Brother Justin in California.

=== Dreifuss family ===
- Felix "Stumpy" Dreifuss played by Toby Huss (seasons 1–2 main cast)
- Rita Sue Dreifuss played by Cynthia Ettinger (seasons 1–2 main cast)
- Libby Dreifuss played by Carla Gallo (seasons 1–2 main cast) – Further information: Season 2 finale and character fates
- Dora Mae Dreifuss played by Amanda Aday (season 1 recurring)

Felix "Stumpy" Dreifuss is the manager of the cootch (striptease) show. He is married to Rita Sue, and has two daughters, Libby and Dora Mae. Their original biographies state Rita Sue was born in Michigan in 1895 as the only child of Thomas and Emma Menninger. Her parents invested in her education at the finest Eastern boarding schools, but the family's financial fortunes declined with Thomas's death in 1903. Rita Sue left her home in 1908 and started vaudeville work. She joined several traveling companies and strip-shows, where she met Stumpy, a barker who had begun his career in 1910. They married in 1914, two months before the birth of their first child, Libby. In 1916, their second daughter, Dora Mae, was born. When their company's owner died, Stumpy and Rita Sue began traveling with various carnival companies and were eventually joined by their two daughters in the late 1920s. Their fortunes steadily declined in the 1930s when more cootch family acts spawned in the difficult times. The series mentions Stumpy and Rita Sue had three more children, one of whom was stillborn and two of whom died of influenza. The Dreifuss family continues to face many personal and economic problems during the show's run. Dora Mae is murdered by an inhabitant of a haunted ghost town, the sexual relationships between Jonesy and Rita Sue, then Jonesy and Libby, cause much heartbreak, and Stumpy's affection for gambling almost ruins the family.

=== Ruthie and Gabriel ===
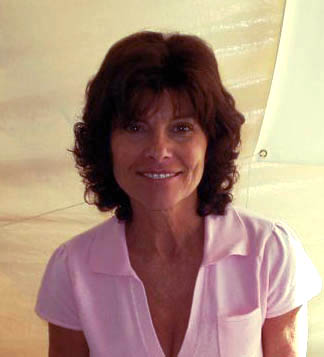
Adrienne Barbeau played Ruthie

- Ruthie played by Adrienne Barbeau (seasons 1–2 main cast)
- Gabriel played by Brian Turk (seasons 1–2 main cast)

Ruthie is a snake charmer and barker for the strongman acts of her son Gabriel. Their arc in the story reveals Ruthie as a former lover of the mysterious Henry Scudder. Gabriel, a big and powerful person but with a low intelligence quotient (IQ), is the first carny to experience Ben's healing powers. Shortly after Ruthie and Ben grow close, Ruthie dies from a snake bite. Ben first tries unsuccessfully to resurrect Ruthie, but succeeds later when he strangles Lodz, the carnival's blind mentalist. In season 2, Ruthie starts to encounter people who have died a long time ago. Being possessed by Lodz at night, Ruthie repeatedly approaches Lila, leading to Lila turning into a major obstacle for the carnival's success.

=== Minor characters ===
- Gecko played by John Fleck (season 1 main cast) – Gecko is the Lizard Man at the carnival. While his disappearance in-between seasons is not directly addressed, Bert mentions hearing about some acts having abandoned Samson (The Road to Damascus).
- Alexandria and Caladonia Potter played by Karyne and Sarah Steben (season 1 main cast) – Alexandria and Caladonia are twins conjoined at the hip. While their disappearance in-between seasons is not directly addressed, Bert mentions hearing about some acts having abandoned Samson (The Road to Damascus).
- Burley played by Scott MacDonald (season 1–2 recurring) – Burley is a roustabout at the carnival.
- Osgood played by Blake Shields (season 1–2 recurring) – Osgood is a roustabout at the carnival.
- Possum played by Bill Moseley (season 1–2 recurring) – Possum is the cook of the carnival.
- Jasper played by Frank Collison (season 1–2 recurring) – Jasper is a barker at the carnival.
- Giant played by Matthew McGrory (season 1–2 recurring) – The giant demonstrates his size in the Ten-in-One.
- Sabina Engstrom played by Bree Walker (season 2 recurring) – Sabina the Scorpion Lady worked at the Daily Brothers Show until its closure and joins the Carnivàle in season 2. She was married to Samson for nine years.
- Bert/Bertha Hagenbeck played by Paul Hipp (season 2 recurring) – Bert/Bertha is the current husband of Sabina. He dresses as half a man, half a woman.
- Rollo the Rubberboy/Boneless Billy Benson played by Daniel Browning Smith (season 2 recurring) – Rollo is a contortionist.
- Stangler played by John Hannah (season 1) – Stangler is a bartender and resident of Babylon; he is executed after a round of "Carnival Justice" due to admitting to the murder of Dora Mae.

== Affiliated with Brother Justin ==
=== Iris Crowe ===
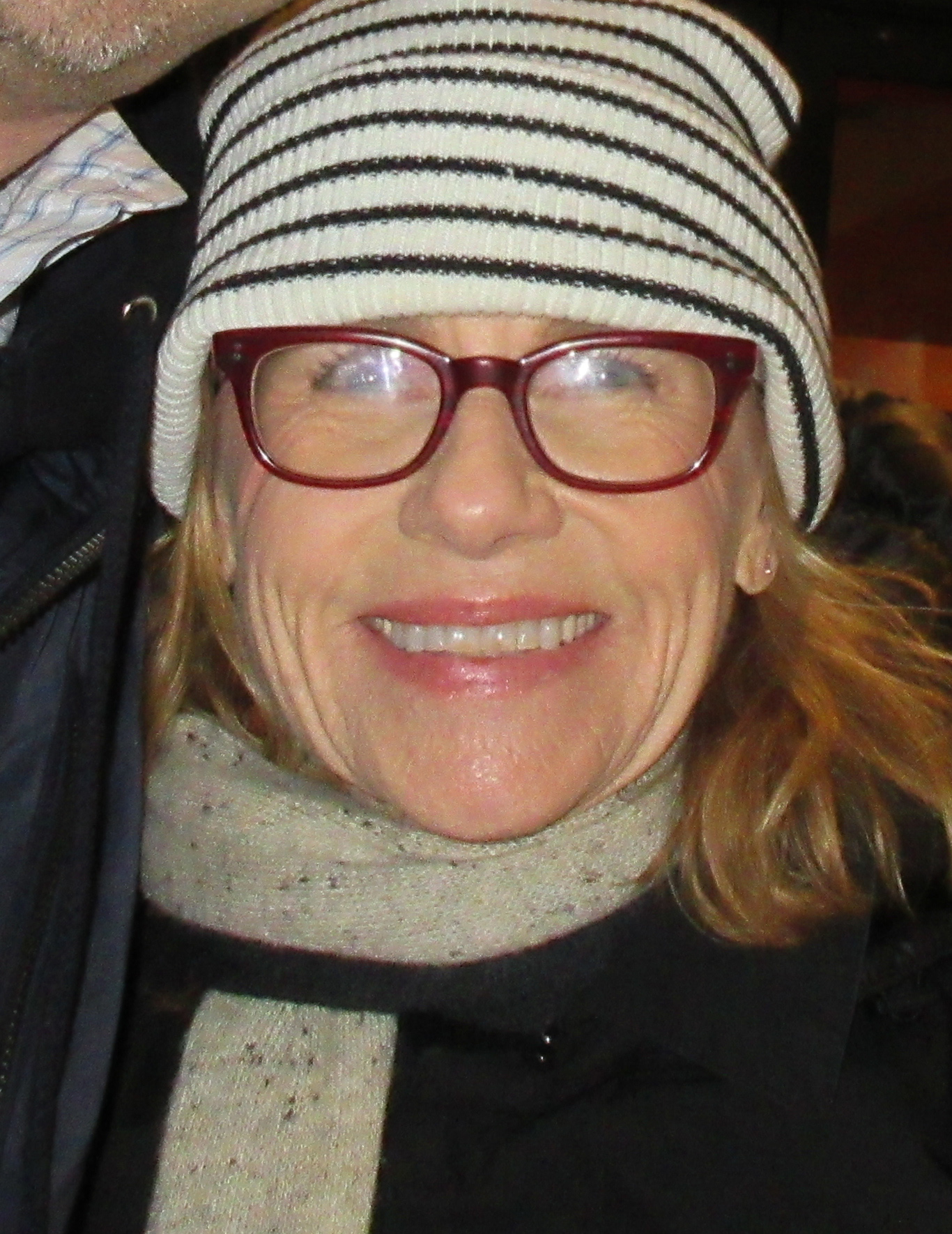
Amy Madigan played Iris Crowe

- Played by Amy Madigan (seasons 1–2 main cast), Erin Sanders (as child, Irina Belyakov) (season 1 recurring cast) – Further information: Genealogy

Iris Crowe is the older sister of Brother Justin and a devoted supporter of his ministry duties in California. Iris' significance in the series starts when Brother Justin informs her about the church board's plan to take away his new ministry. Shortly after, a fire in the church kills several orphans, but it remains unknown until the end of the first season that Iris was the arsonist. Radio show host Tommy Dolan, who arrived to help with the arson investigation, develops feelings for Iris, but a romance is hindered by Brother Justin's return from a week-long self-discovery trip. Dolan starts to uncover evidence pointing to Iris's guilt, but a strange twist at Iris's planned public confession results in Dolan's arrest as the culprit. To prevent the revelation of Brother Justin's true nature, Iris murders an innocent Okie, Eleanor. Late in the second season, Iris joins her foster father Norman in an ultimately unsuccessful plot against Brother Justin.

=== Tommy Dolan ===
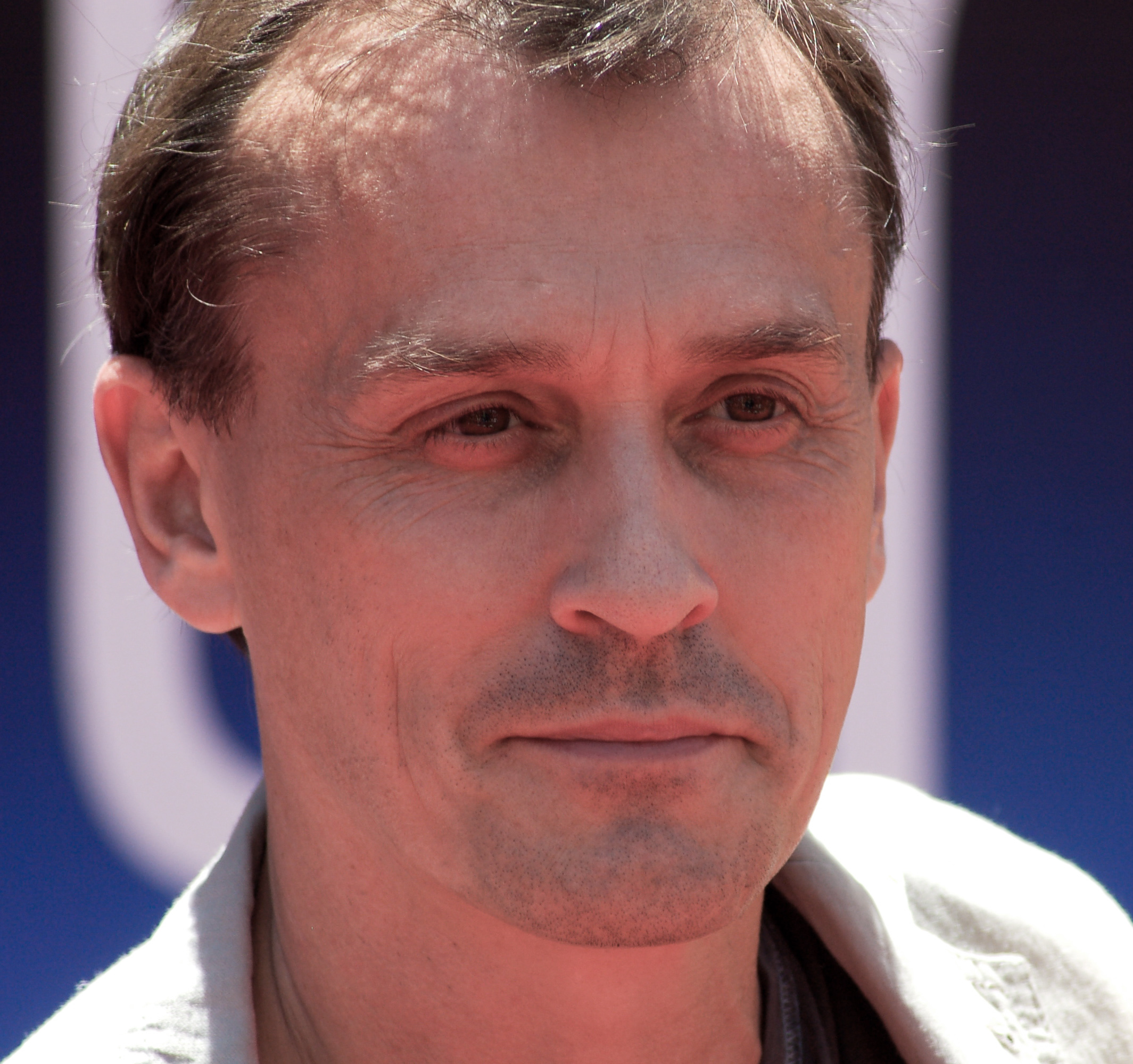
Robert Knepper played Tommy Dolan

- Played by Robert Knepper (seasons 1–2 recurring)

Tommy Dolan is a radio show host and news reporter from Los Angeles, who regularly travels incognito into the wilderness to collect strangers' stories for his show Tommy Dolan on the Road. His first appearance in the series occurs when he meets Brother Justin around a campfire. After retelling Brother Justin's story of the burned-down ministry in his radio show, Dolan approaches Brother Justin's sister Iris and helps her with receiving funds for a new church. Dolan is seemingly attracted to Iris, but Brother Justin's return prevents further advances. By the beginning of season 2, Dolan has fulfilled Brother Justin's wish to become a radio preacher, yet police evidence surfaces first hinting at Brother Justin's, then Iris' guilt in the arson. Trying to further his career, Dolan collects evidence until Brother Justin accepts the arrangement of a special confession announcement for Iris. The confession backfires and Dolan is arrested, with Iris's guilt never proven.

=== Reverend Norman Balthus ===
- Played by Ralph Waite (season 1 recurring, season 2 main cast) – Further information: Genealogy

Reverend Norman Balthus is Brother Justin's mentor. He rescued and raised young Justin and Iris after he had found them alone in the wilderness. Late in the first season, Norman grows suspicious of Brother Justin's inner motivations. He confronts his foster son but does not carry out Brother Justin's plea to kill him. At the beginning of season 2, Norman suffers a stroke leaving him unable to move or speak. He remains in the care of Brother Justin and Iris until the carnival sets up near Brother Justin's home at the end of the series. Ben heals Norman, but the reverend is fatally lacerated by Brother Justin seconds later.

=== Varlyn Stroud ===
- Played by John Carroll Lynch (season 2 recurring)

Varlyn Stroud is a convict. His original biography gives insight into his criminal past and names Stroud's sister Clara as his first murder. When Clara was nine years old, Stroud deliberately upset a Ferris wheel car so Clara fell to her death. Stroud's second murder was his grandfather three years later, which he covered as a hunting accident. Having possibly committed over a dozen contract-killings, Stroud was never convicted of murder, yet still spent most of his life in prison on a variety of charges. Stroud's story arc in the series begins in season 2 when he hears Brother Justin's radio sermon. Made Brother Justin's apostle in a subliminal message, Stroud escapes prison to find and bring Henry Scudder to Brother Justin. Stroud first tracks Scudder's old life and later follows the route of the carnival. With Ben's unintentional aid, Stroud finally finds the man he is looking for. After delivering Scudder to Brother Justin, Stroud becomes his security manager, which significantly hinders the carnival's aim to kill Brother Justin.

=== Minor characters ===
- Eleanor McGill played by K Callan (seasons 1–2 recurring) – Eleanor McGill is an Okie who becomes a devoted follower of Brother Justin.
- Val Templeton played by Glenn Shadix (seasons 1–2 recurring) – Val Templeton, cousin of Chin's owner Carroll Templeton, is a councilman in Mintern.
- Ned Munson played by Matt McCoy (seasons 1–2 recurring) – Ned Munson is a councilman in Mintern California, assisting Val Templeton.
- Wilfred Talbot Smith played by Time Winters (season 2 recurring) – Wilfred Talbot Smith advises Brother Justin in occult matters in relation to the Usher.
- Bishop McNaughton played by John Aylward (season 2 recurring) – Bishop McNaughton oversees the church of Reverend Norman Balthus and Brother Justin.
- Garrett played by Dennis W. Hall (Season 1–2, recurring) – Garrett is married and has children with Maggie, the niece of Eleanor McGill.
- Carroll Templeton played by Ron Perkins (season 1) – Carroll Templeton, cousin of Val Templeton, is the owner of Chin's. Brother Justin reveals his sins, which leads to his suicide.

== From the past ==
Since the first episodes of Carnivàle, Ben's parentage is one of the big puzzles. As a man named Henry Scudder seems connected to everything and everyone, it is Ben's job to piece together the mystery of his own past. The progressing series indicates many characters are more closely interrelated than what both the characters and the audience would imagine at first. Although these links rarely receive plot attention, the immediate genealogy of the main characters is cleared up by the end of the second season. Other character links that were largely unanswered after Carnivàle's cancellation concern the trench war and the Hyde & Teller Company in relation to the emergence of the Carnivàle. Daniel Knauf, character biographies on the HBO website and the Pitch Document later provided detail for what was originally envisioned. Although the nature of these sources does not qualify them for canon status, they provide a framework for hints dropped in the series.

=== Henry Scudder ===
- Played by John Savage (seasons 1–2 recurring)

Henry "Hack" Scudder is a mysterious man who appears in Ben's and Brother Justin's dreams wearing a tuxedo. Scudder is mentioned several times in the first season, revealing he once worked at the carnival's geek show and was Ruthie's lover. Scudder also had a relationship with Ben's mother once; Samson later confirms Scudder as Ben's father. Season 2 forces both Ben and Brother Justin to find Scudder for their own purposes. It is confirmed that he is the previous generation's Creature of Darkness, and just as Management, the previous Avatar of Light, knew Ben's identity, he knows Brother Justin's, the current Avatar of Darkness. He had repeatedly tried to flee from his destiny, and when he sensed Management approaching he fled to protect Ben and his mother. After a long journey, Ben finds Scudder in Damascus, Nebraska and brings him to the carnival's Management and reveals that Management's son is the Avatar of Darkness. Management attacks Scudder, leading to Ben killing Management to protect him. Scudder flees and moments later, escaped convict Stroud kidnaps him and brings him to Brother Justin. Brother Justin anticipates Scudder's renewed escape and decapitates him.

=== Lucius Belyakov (Management) ===
- Played by Michael Massee and Vladislav Kozlov (Russian soldier), Cameron Clapp (body), Linda Hunt (voice) (seasons 1–2 recurring)

Lucius Belyakov is a mysterious man who appears in Ben's and Brother Justin's dreams as a Russian soldier. He is also revealed to be the previous generation's Creature of Light. Unknown at first, he is also the carnival's Management, hiding in his trailer and communicating with his carny workers solely through Samson. He is also the father of Iris and Justin Crowe. As Management remains unseen during the first season, it is unclear at first whether Management exists at all. Late in the season, however, Management is shown to have a conversation with Lodz. In the second season, Management reveals himself to Ben as Lucius Belyakov, the soldier of his dreams who was once badly injured by a bear. Management wants Ben to break an unfolding chain of catastrophic events, which will lead to the death of millions. Management urges Ben to find and bring Scudder to him, as he will know the identity of the current generation's Avatar of Darkness. After Ben accomplishes his mission, Management attacks Scudder and is stabbed by Ben to protect the latter. Ben reveals to Samson that Management had planned for Ben to kill him so all his powers would pass to Ben. With his last breath, Management tells Ben how to defeat the Usher, Ben's ultimate nemesis.

=== Emergence of the Carnivàle ===
"On the heels of the skirmish Man foolishly called the war to end all wars, the Dark One sought to elude his destiny ... live as a mortal. So he fled across the ocean, to an empire called America ... but by his mere presence, a cancer corrupted the spirit of the land. People were rendered mute by fools who spoke many words, but said nothing ... for whom oppression and cowardice were virtues ... and freedom, an obscenity. Into this dark heartland, the Prophet stalked his enemy ... until, diminished by his wounds, he turned to the next in the ancient line of light. And so it was that the fate of all mankind came to rest on the trembling shoulders of the most reluctant of saviors."
— Samson in "Los Moscos"

Although Carnivàle is set in the mid-1930s, Ben and Brother Justin have visions and dreams suggesting the story began much earlier. Samson summarizes the backstory in a monologue at the beginning of season 2, without mentioning names. The Pitch Document, which served as the source for the character biographies on the HBO website, provides context for all clues.

The carnival's backstory begins at the end of the nineteenth century when Lucius Belyakov, a Russian aristocrat from Minsk and officer in the Tsar's army, became aware of his Avataric powers. The birth of his son Alexei evoked dark visions in him. After Belyakov's attempt to kill two-year-old Alexei, his wife fled with their two children to America, but news spread they perished in a train accident soon thereafter. Resuming his duties in Lemberg in 1914, Belyakov was again afflicted by dark visions. Henry Scudder, an American who had escaped prosecution for criminal activities in his home country by joining foreign armies, had had psychokinetic powers since childhood. At the time of Belyakov's visions, Scudder was stationed in Lemberg as an observer for the Austro-Hungarian Army. Belyakov became obsessed with killing his spiritual enemy (Scudder) and deserted his post, but an escaped circus bear feeding on the dead nearby surprised him in an attack. Belyakov was so gravely injured he would lose an arm and both legs.

Scudder escaped and encountered carnival performer Lodz on the battlefield, searching for his bear Bruno. When Scudder joined Lodz's troupe, Lodz recognized and cultivated Scudder's supernatural abilities, and they started to perform in the salons of war-torn Europe. Meanwhile, Belyakov slowly recovered from his wounds and learned about his true nature and destiny through devoted study of ancient manuscripts. Scudder could feel Belyakov tracking his movements and never stayed long in one area. Growing impatient, Lodz got into a fight with Scudder about his skills and was gifted with mindreading in exchange for his sense of sight. Scudder returned to America in 1915 to flee his nightmares. Several months later, Belyakov located the broken-down Lodz in Venice. Belyakov noticed the mental bond between Lodz and Scudder the power transfer had caused, and promised to restore Lodz's sight if he helped in finding Scudder.

Scudder fell in love and married a local girl named Flora Hawkins from Milfay, Oklahoma, with whom he had a son, Ben. When Scudder felt his pursuing enemy again, he left his family and traveled aimlessly throughout the country. After narrowly surviving a cave-in in Babylon, he joined the Hyde & Teller Company, a small carnival working the southeastern circuit. Scudder worked as a sideshow geek for nearly a year and got to know Samson, Jonesy, Possum, Lila, Ruthie and Gabriel. Meanwhile, Belyakov used Lodz's tracking skills and purchased the Hyde & Teller Company, scantily missing Scudder. To remain undercover, Belyakov renamed the troupe "Carnivàle", assumed the name "Management", and replaced Samson with Lodz as the new co-manager. Lodz finally located Scudder in St. Louis, but when Lodz failed in preventing Scudder from going into hiding again (with the Order Templar), Samson regained his old job. Over the years, the Carnivàle took on new acts such as the fortunetellers Apollonia and Sofie, the conjoined twins, Gecko the Lizard Man, and the Dreifuss family. While Lodz embitteredly waited for Management to fulfill his earlier promise of restoring his sight, Samson ran the show, counseled by Management and assisted by Jonesy. Eighteen years went by until Management felt Ben Hawkins, whom he had sensed as his Ascendant since birth, was old enough to be approached. At this point, the first season of Carnivàle resumes the story.

=== Genealogy ===
Emma Krohn	Hilton Scudder
Owen	Alvin Sr.	Gilbert	Henry Scudder	Flora Hawkins	Lucius Belyakov	Plemina Belyakov	Norman Balthus	Clara Balthus
Alvin Jr.	Ben Hawkins	Iris Crowe / Irina Belyakov	Justin Crowe / Alexsei Belyakov	Apollonia Bojakshiya
Sofie Bojakshiya

The pilot episode begins with Ben Hawkins waking up from a dream of a tattooed man, a man in a tuxedo, and a Russian soldier. Ben's childhood is revealed in flashbacks and dialogue; Ben's father had left the family's farm when Ben was an infant, leaving him in the care of Flora, Ben's mother. Late season 1 confirms what early episodes had already suggested – the man in the tuxedo, Henry Scudder, is Ben's father. In the second season, Ben meets his paternal grandmother, Emma Krohn, and learns she killed her husband Hilton Scudder on the night of Henry's birth, along with Henry's older brothers Owen, Gilbert, and Alvin Sr. (According to Knauf and the HBO website, Emma's other sons were from a previous marriage to Clarke "C.W." Powell, who had died by natural causes.) Emma introduces the people living with her as her grandchildren and Ben's cousins.

Brother Justin Crowe is introduced as a devoted Methodist minister, who is supported by his sister Iris. On a self-discovery trip in the middle of the first season, Brother Justin has an elaborate vision of two Russian immigrant children, Irina and her younger brother Alexei; Irina talks of her evil father. As revealed shortly afterwards, this vision is a repressed memory of Brother Justin of him and Iris as the only survivors of a train accident which had also cost their mother's life. Reverend Norman Balthus later saved Irina and Alexei and raised them in a church orphanage. A vision prompts Brother Justin to get his chest tattooed early in the second season.

Some people of the Carnivàle are closely related. Apollonia and Sofie are introduced as mother and daughter working as fortunetellers. Sofie grew up not knowing her father, but has a vision later in the first season of the Tattooed Man raping her mother. In the season 2 opening episode, Management, the mysterious leader of the carnival, reveals himself as Lucius Belyakov, the Russian soldier of Ben's dreams. Moments before his death several episodes later, Belyakov learns that his son Alexei (Brother Justin) did not die in a train accident, as he had previously believed. In the meantime, Sofie has become the Crowes' maid. When she has a chat with Iris about her childhood, Iris has a vision of Brother Justin as a young man raping Apollonia during his seminary studies in Saint Paul. Although Iris only informs Norman of her suspicions, Sofie sees Brother Justin's tattooed chest in the final episode of season 2 and has implicit visions insinuating Brother Justin as her father. Future seasons of Carnivàle would have expanded the Belyakov genealogy, making a fusion with the Scudder genealogy possible.

== Casting ==
The casting approach for Carnivàle was to find the best available actors and to show the characters' realness as opposed to depending on freak illusions too much. Carnivàle's casting directors John Papsodera and Wendy O'Brien already had experience in casting freaks from previous projects. They attended theater showcases, approached smaller agents or hired some actors directly to find people with unique and distinct looks, which was trying as Los Angeles is a stronghold of good-looking actors. The producers generally preferred actors who were not strongly identified with other projects but were willing to make exceptions for established actors such as Adrienne Barbeau (Ruthie).

The script for the pilot episode was the basis for the casting procedure, with little indication where the show would go afterwards. This resulted in some preliminary casting disagreements between the creators and producers, especially for leading characters. Nick Stahl had the strongest consensus among the producers to portray the leading man and hero of the series with a youthful, innocent and anti-hero quality. The character of Sofie was originally written as more of an exotic gypsy girl, but Clea DuVall, a movie actress trying to become involved in regular television, got the part after four auditions. Tim DeKay, who had previously worked with Daniel Knauf on a pilot episode of a different project, was cast as Jonesy because the producers felt he best portrayed a "very American" looking baseball player of the 1930s period. Debra Christofferson impressed the producers with her first and only audition, playing Lila as Lodz's lover instead of his best friend as the script had implied. Adrienne Barbeau (Ruthie) was cast after her first audition as well, although she had originally expected to be cast as Apollonia. She learned to snake-dance afterwards. Brian Turk's role as Gabriel was originally intended to be a mute character described as "a mildly retarded strongman with the face of an angel", but the writers later gave Turk a speaking part to not have another mute character like Management and Apollonia. One of the only actors who never had any real competition was Michael J. Anderson as Samson, whom Daniel Knauf had wanted as early as the initial casting meeting; Samson, Knauf's favorite character, was inspired by Knauf's father.

The filmed pilot episode served as basis for additional tweaking of intended story lines. The expanded role of Brother Justin encouraged the creation of his sister Iris in a supporting role, for which Amy Madigan was cast. Little was changed on Ben Hawkins' side except for the addition of the cootch (striptease) Dreifuss family; a Carnivàle consultant had elated the producers by calling attention to his research about families managing cootch shows in the 1930s. Cynthia Ettinger (Rita Sue Dreifuss) had lost her role as Martha Kent in the pilot episode of Smallville before the opportunity for Carnivàle came up and had turned to theater jobs; she chose Carnivàle because of the theater-like experience. Amanda Aday (Dora Mae Dreifuss) knew she would join the cast for only a few episodes, but was not told the story reasons at that point. The writers prolonged the character arcs of recurring John Carroll Lynch (Stroud) and K Callan (Eleanor) considerably beyond their original intention. Similarly, Robert Knepper's role as Tommy Dolan was extended from a few episodes to half of both seasons because the writers had liked his performance as an "ambitious man [who uses] Brother Justin to further his career."

Genetic disorders or unusual body features are not uncommon among Carnivàle actors. Michael J. Anderson (Samson) has osteogenesis imperfecta, a genetic bone disorder that leaves him at a size of 3 ft 7 (109 cm), while Matthew McGrory (Giant) stood at 7 ft 6 (228 cm) because of hyperpituitarism. Bree Walker (Sabina) has ectrodactyly, a rare genetic disorder that results in fused fingers and toes; she approached the producers in the second season to let her play a "lobster gal". Several actors for one-time characters like the lobster gal in "Hot and Bothered" and Percy the Praying Mantis in "The Road to Damascus" were also cast for their respective real-life disabilities. Cameron Clapp (Management) had lost an arm and both legs in a train accident at the age of 15. Daniel Browning Smith (Rollo the Rubberboy) holds two Guinness World Records for his body-bending abilities. The actors playing the roles of the conjoined twins (Karyne and Sarah Steben, identical twins and real-life trapezists), Lila the Bearded Lady (Debra Christofferson) and Gecko the Lizard Man (John Fleck) are performers without genetic aberrances whose appearances were altered through makeup and prosthetics.

== Make-up and costumes ==
To give the illusion of being freaks, the appearance of several actors was modified by make-up elements. John Fleck (Gecko) spent over ten hours in makeup each day to transform into and out of his character. The skin, which needed to look like alligator hide, consisted of seven or eight separate pieces and needed to be glued to Fleck's face. Patrick Bauchau (Lodz) had several contact lens pairs of different opaqueness. While one pair enabled him to see shapes, another pair made him basically blind and he had to be led around the set. Debra Christofferson (Lila) had a fake beard applied to her chin; the beard was custom-made by hand-tying human hair onto lace that would disappear when the beard was glued onto the skin. The beard of the early episodes was so heavy that the chemicals caused Christofferson's skin to be raw at the end of the shooting day, and was later split into three pieces. Christofferson still needed to be careful with mouth movements. According to the actress, "the beard actually determined Lila's voice."

Establishing the characters' background rather than prettiness was the main goal of costumes. Ben wore the same clothes in both seasons, and to make them look identical, around twenty multiples of his coveralls were made by hand. It took over six weeks to apply all stitches, patches and the roughly fifty holes, plus the aging process. Brother Justin's clothes were made period-correct from the beginning, but the character's foreboding presence was enhanced by fitting his frock on the waist and making the shoulders look bigger than usual for that time period. Sofie's clothes had a strong Bohemian Eastern influence to portray her mother's origin and sensibilities. Stumpy's wardrobe consisted of baggy pants and an Italian bowler hat that gave him a 1920s look instead of the 1930s, showing his clothes were second-hand. The stripper clothes of Rita Sue and Libby were influenced by Mae West, harlot movies and silent films of the 1920s and 1930s, with additional research put into Asian harlots, Latin dancers and Hawaiian dancers. The costume designers chose the costumes of the Daily Brothers Show, a rival carnival, to have a new color tone to set them apart from the Carnivàle. The dress of Sabina the Scorpion Lady underwent several die-bleaching cycles to achieve a red-orange-purple color that would work well when filming outside. Bert/Bertha's costume was made in a hurry from a vintage tuxedo and an old feathered dress, which helped to give it a "made-it-on-the-road" feeling.

In 2004, Carnivàle won a Hollywood Makeup Artist and Hair Stylist Guild Award and two Emmys in the categories "Outstanding Costumes for a Series" and "Outstanding Hairstyling for a Series". The show was also nominated in the Emmy category "Outstanding Makeup for a Series (Non-Prosthetic)" both in 2004 and 2005, and in the categories "Outstanding Costumes for a Series", "Outstanding Hairstyling for a Series", and "Outstanding Prosthetic Makeup for a Series, Miniseries, Movie or a Special" in 2005. In the same year, Carnivàle was nominated for two Costume Designers Guild Awards in the categories "Outstanding Costume Design for Television Series – Period/Fantasy" and "Excellence in Costume Design for Television – Period/Fantasy", winning the latter.

== Reception ==
As early reviews focused on Ben Hawkins, Brother Justin Crowe and the meaning of Carnivàle, the show's supporting characters received little to no attention other than having their freak appearances mentioned, according to Variety's Phil Gallo because "they don't play significant parts in the first few episodes." Critics who reviewed full seasons gave more credit. Wendy Tuohy of the Australian newspaper The Age stated that Knauf "sprinkled enough magical gifts over the carnival's cast of mind readers, fortunetellers, snake charmers, catatonic psychics, conjoined twins, bearded ladies and lizard men to make the bizarre and the macabre appear just about routine." Matt Casamassina of IGN added that "from the opening sequence to the fade out on episode 12 [of season 1], Carnivàle successfully draws you into the Depression-engulfed world of its many oddly likeable characters. And sure enough, odd best describes these people ... The show prominently features all manners of freaks, but each is well-crafted, layered, and believable, rather than comical, as easily could have been the case under amateur direction." MSNBC acknowledged the characters "speak[ing] in a dialogue that feels authentic, even if that authenticity is a modern interpretation ... Carnivàle manager Samson, Anderson gets the best dialogue, dropping terrifically incomprehensible lines." DVD Talk lauded Madigan (Iris), DeKay (Jonesy), and DuVall (Sofie) as "fantastic choices" with particularly convincing 1930s looks. They highlighted Carnivàle's status as an ensemble show, with "the performances of all the supporting characters [being] essential to the show's success. Particularly inspired is the voice of Linda Hunt as the decidedly creepy 'Management' and John Savage as Henry Scudder." A DVDTown review further praised the supporting performances of Bauchau (Lodz) and Michael J. Anderson (Samson), pointing out that "in fact, every single character on the show, no matter how small, quirky or sinister they are, produce noteworthy performances all round. It is through the efforts of this outstanding cast that makes the entire premise of the show and the period setting so realistic and believable that the audience can't help but get immersed in it."

Several supporting actors received award recognition for their performances in Carnivàle. Barbeau (Ruthie) was nominated for a 2003 Golden Satellite Award in the category "Best Performance by an Actress in a Supporting Role in a Series, Drama", and won a 2004 WIN Award in the category "Best Actress in a Dramatic Series". Amy Madigan (Iris) was nominated for a 2003 Golden Satellite Award in the category "Best Performance by an Actress in a Series, Drama". Erin Sanders (young Iris) was nominated for a 2004 Young Artist Award in the category "Best Performance in a TV Series – Recurring Young Actress".

== Season 2 finale and fates ==
While HBO entertainment president Carolyn Strauss felt Carnivàle had come to a natural end with its second season and gave this as the network's explanation for not renewing Carnivàle, it was reported HBO president Chris Albrecht had originally wanted to conclude the second season of Carnivàle with a satisfying and close-ended confrontation between Brother Justin and Ben. Albrecht allegedly preferred a definite demise of Brother Justin to a cliffhanger, but Knauf stated Albrecht might have been misquoted. According to Knauf, Albrecht had wished in preproduction discussions to conclude season 2 with a fight between Brother Justin and Ben, which had always been Knauf's intention. HBO had then approved the open ending by greenlighting the final scene in the writing phase, budgeting the filming including the final shot, and owning the rights of the final cut of all episodes. There was never a plan to cancel Carnivàle prematurely, and HBO had only decided the cancellation shortly before their announcement. However, Clancy Brown (Brother Justin) remembers the original last shot of the series as Iris watching the corn die, not of Ben in Management's trailer.

Following the cancellation, the writers did not immediately answer fan questions about the characters' future, arguing the story ideas should not be revealed just for instant fan gratification and should wait to be told when the opportunity arises. They later provided clues in DVD special features and at conventions, in forums and in online chats. Tim DeKay mentioned that the third season would have opened five years after the events of the second-season finale. Daniel Knauf said Jonesy would have recovered from his gunshot wound, having been saved by Iris. Producer Howard Klein however pointed out that Jonesy "wasn't shot in a specific place – he [just] collapsed", and Knauf added, "Sofie's intent in shooting Jonesy was to stop him from taking her back to the carnival", not to kill him. Season 3 would have opened with Jonesy pitching in a Major League Baseball game and still being married to Libby, as well as having a son with her.

Writer and co-executive producer William Schmidt described Sofie's last seen action as "raising her father at the end, bringing him back to life." This was "to indicate that she was truly evil", although "she is the Omega so there's good in her too." The third season "would have been pretty much centered on Sofie and the internal struggle of her good versus evil." The nature of the Omega would have taken two seasons to unfold.

Both Ben and Brother Justin would have been alive in the third season. Daniel Knauf would have written Brother Justin as a man "with an inoperable chunk of shrapnel near his heart", which the anointed blade had caused in the final season 2 episode. Brother Justin would have been "severely weakened and prone to exhaustion, serving as a hollow figurehead in his burgeoning ministry. Sofie and Iris would be vying for the power behind the throne, with Sofie by far the more dangerous of the two, although Iris is a force to be reckoned with." Knauf had the intention of marrying Brother Justin to Sofie at some point in the future, and the third season would have shown a three-year-old boy amidst Sofie and the Crowes. Knauf left the question about the child's parents open. Ben's future would face other hardships. According to Knauf, Ben's wounds of the season 2 finale would require repeated suturing, causing him to lose his Vitae Divina and draining him of strength. Ben would be a different man than he was before, with a personality closer to Management, and while he and Sofie would be bound together by love, their ultimate fates remain uncertain.
