= Mythology of Carnivàle =

Overview of use of mythology in Carnivàle

Raphael's Saint Michael Vanquishing Satan in the opening titles of Carnivàle

"Before the Beginning, after the great war between Heaven and Hell, God created the Earth and gave dominion over it to the crafty ape he called Man. And to each generation was born a Creature of Light and a Creature of Darkness... and great armies clashed by night in the ancient war between good and evil. There was magic then. Nobility. And unimaginable cruelty. And so it was until the day that a false sun exploded over Trinity, and man forever traded away wonder for reason."

— Samson in "Milfay"

Carnivàle is an American television series set in the United States during the Great Depression. The series traces the disparate storylines of a young carnival worker named Ben Hawkins and Brother Justin Crowe, a preacher in California. The overarching story is built around a good and evil theme, which serves as a human-scaled metaphor within a complex structure of myth and allegory. Samson, who is a dwarf and manages the carnival, sets up the show's mythology with a prologue in the pilot episode, talking of "a creature of light and a creature of darkness" being born "to each generation" preparing for a final battle.

Most mythological elements in Carnivàle relate to so-called Avatars (or Creatures of Light and Darkness), fictional human-like beings with supernatural powers who embody good and evil. In its first season Carnivàle does not reveal its characters as Avatars beyond insinuation, and makes the nature of suggested Avatars a central question. By the second season it is established that Ben is a Creature of Light and Brother Justin a Creature of Darkness. Other than through the characters, the show's good-and-evil theme manifests in the series' contemporary religion, the Christian military order Knights Templar, tarot divination, and in historical events like the Dust Bowl and humankind's first nuclear test. Show creator Daniel Knauf did not respond to questions about the mythology but did provide hints about the mythological structure to online fandom both during and after the two-season run of Carnivàle. Nevertheless, many of the intended clues remained unnoticed by viewers. Knauf left fans a production summary of Carnivàle's first season two years after cancellation. This so-called Pitch Document, originally written to give HBO and Knauf's co-writers an overview of the intended storyline, backed up and expanded upon the assumed mythological rules.

== Avatars ==
The term Avatar (also spelled Avatara) originates in Hindu mythology, where it most commonly refers to the incarnation (bodily manifestation) of a higher being or the Supreme Being on Earth. Carnivàle's story never clearly establishes the meaning of this term, yet HBO and the writers used the term interchangeably with the Creatures of Light and Darkness of the series' opening monologue. The series portrays Avatars as human-like beings with supernatural powers who embody good and evil, and whose constant and age-long struggle serves to explain the Dark Ages and Ages of Enlightenment in humanity's history in the real world. Carnivàle represents this Avataric duality as Light and Dark in several instances. The surnames of the main characters, Ben Hawkins and Justin Crowe, suggest a symbolic link to hawks and crows, the winged Creatures of Light and Dark. The last two Tarot cards seen in the Carnivàle's opening title sequence are "The Sun" and "The Moon", standing for God and the Devil. By the same token, the show's title card and the logo of the carnival depict a sun placed opposite a moon. Show creator Daniel Knauf designed this logo.

=== Characteristics ===
The characters Ben Hawkins and Brother Justin Crowe are revealed to be Avatars through the usage of their supernatural powers; however, viewers did not find it immediately apparent whether a suspected Avatar served as good or evil. The series gave clues, such as depicting the Creatures of Darkness with coal-black eyes (according to Daniel Knauf, Creatures of Light have an invisible aura). An Avatar's nature is determined by the type and application of his powers. As the Pitch Document states, Avatars draw their talents and powers from the same pool. These abilities may vary in type and strength, and include but are not limited to the manipulation and transfer of life force, spiritual healings, telekinesis and telepathy, and granting small measures of powers to a mortal. Although the series showed the powers of Ben and Brother Justin, reviewers were still unsure about the main characters' Avataric nature by the end of the first season. When Ben's good nature and Justin's dark heritage became clearer in Season 2, reviewers began to describe Carnivàle's underlying message as "essentially the opposite of spiritual belief: fatalism". Daniel Knauf disputed any theory of determinism, and repeatedly pointed to the characters' free will to overcome their destiny. Free choice allows the story to portray Avatars as deliberately not making use of their powers or as acting contrary to their nature; an Avatar would however still have to put consistent effort into not lapsing back into his defined moral behavior.

The Pitch Document described Avatars as sharing the ability to envision the past, present and future, both literally and symbolically. Accessing this plane of pure truth is given as an Avatar's birthright and can be improved through study and practice. Avatars can manipulate and transmit the resulting visions through dreams to others. As far as established, only Creatures of Darkness suffer physical weakness or pain when their opposite makes use of his powers. Avatars can sense the existence of their moral opponent, but are unable to detect or identify them outside of close physical proximity. They can, however, easily detect and locate an Avatar of like kind over great distances with great accuracy. These abilities contribute to the convergence of the two storylines in Carnivàle.

=== Terms and order of succession ===
Example of an Avataric pedigree including names

Alpha
Prophet (CoL) | Prophet (CoD)
Vectorus (f) | Vectorus (f) | Vectorus (f) | Prophet (CoL) | Vectorus (f) | Prophet (CoD)
Vectorus (f) | Vectorus (m) | Vectorus (m) | Prophet (CoD) | Vectorus (f) | Prophet (CoL) †
Vectorus (m) | Prophet (Hilton) (CoL) * | Vectorus (f) | Prophet (CoD) † | Vectorus (f) | Vectorus (f)
Vectorus (f) | Prophet (Henry) (CoD) | Prophet (Lucius) (CoL) * | Vectorus (m) | Vectorus (f) | Vectorus (f)
Vectorus (f) | Prince (Ben) (CoL) | Vectorus (Irina) (f) | Usher (Justin) (CoD) | Vectorus (m) | Vectorus (m)
Omega

- CoL = Creature of Light
- CoD = Creature of Darkness
- † = last Avatar of a dynasty without male offspring
- * = first Avatar of a new dynasty

Daniel Knauf overlaid the Avatars of the fictional universe with an elaborate order of succession by blood, similar to the ascent of royal families. The descriptors Royals, King and Prince are replaced in the series with Vectori, Prophet and Prince. Female royals like Queens and Princesses do not have a fictional counterpart and are instead replaced with the concepts of the Alpha, the Omega and the Usher. These Wild Card Avatars have special rules in addition to, or replacing, the normal ones. Reviewers rarely focused on the significance of the mentioned Avataric terms and their implied characteristics in the story, despite detailed explanations by Knauf and the later public availability of Carnivàle's Pitch Document, setting out the complex mythological structure.

The first Prophet in the mythology of Carnivàle is the Alpha. This creature is never mentioned in the series, but Knauf described her as a female who lived before the Flood and whose story was lost with the destruction of the Royal Library of Alexandria. The Alpha spawned the first pair of Avatara, manifestations of some higher power or House; one is Light and the other Dark. A Creature of Light and a Creature of Darkness have been born to each generation since, and unlike the Alpha, they have always been male.

The Avataric Blood travels within families forming a dynasty. The first-born son of an Avatar receives a so-called mantle at birth that manifests him as an Avatar of a new generation; whether the new Avatar is Light or Dark is chance. Therefore, there is one Avatar to each House per generation. Giving birth to a new Avatar leaves the mother barren and insane. Before that time, she can give birth to an unlimited number of females from an Avatar. These children as well as their respective offspring are called Vectori, beings with Avataric Blood who are not themselves Avatara, and who thus become generationally further removed from an Avatar in the bloodline. While Vectori cannot become Avatara, as that mantle is only conveyed upon birth, they can still exhibit some minor powers and often show signs of insanity.

The eldest generational Avatar within a House is dominant and called the Prophet. He possesses blue blood, also called Vitae Divina. The next in line is the Ascendant Prince. Any additional Avatara within the House are Princes ranked by generation. Although Avatara form blood dynasties from father to son, House affiliations can be mixed within a dynasty. If the youngest Prince in a dynasty dies, the dynasty is ended. Most dynasties only last on average three generations, since typical Avatara can be killed by any means. When a dynasty ends, the first male child born elsewhere in the world with the most Avataric blood will be a new Prince starting a new dynasty.

When a Prophet dies while an Ascendant Prince also lives, one of two things happens. If the Prophet is killed by his Ascendant Prince, the Prince will gain the mantle of the Prophet with a boon (full measure of power). For the boon to be passed, the Prophet must be of sound mind, and either willingly pass on the boon, or be taken by surprise so that he cannot put up a psychic defense. If however the Prophet is impaired, the Ascendant Prince may be driven insane. If a Prophet dies in any other way, the Ascendant Prince will be automatically raised to Prophet in his stead, without chance of a boon.

Two unique Avatars join the Alpha as an exception to the Avataric rule. Carnivàle's Avataric mythology prophesied the Usher of Destruction throughout the ages as a harbinger of the End Times to usher in the Armageddon. He is known by a thousand names in a thousand books, but can only manifest once. He appears as the Tattooed Man in visions, and he can only be killed with a weapon infused with the Vitae Divina that is thrust into the bough of his tree tattoo where his dark heart dwells. Injuries from such anointed weapons are said to never fully heal. Also prophesied is the Omega (known in the Pitch Document as Omega The Destroyer and the Antichrist), whom Carnivàle's occult characters had assumed for a long time to be one and the same with the Usher. The Omega is, like the Alpha, a female and the only other known exception to the male restriction in Avatar succession, and because of the allusion to "the Beginning and the End" in naming, the Omega is commonly accepted as the last Avatar.

=== Manifestation in the series ===
The Gospel of Matthias in the episode "Alamogordo, NM".

Certain characters have seemingly supernatural abilities from the beginning of the series. Ben Hawkins and Brother Justin Crowe not only have common visions of two soldiers (one of them also appearing in a tuxedo) and a man with a tattooed tree on his chest, but also of each other. Ben can heal and resurrect beings at the cost of others' life, while Brother Justin can read and manipulate people's minds. Ben and Lodz, a blind mentalist of the carnival, experience visions of the medieval Knights Templar. Carnival fortuneteller Sofie can communicate telepathically with her catatonic mother, whom she once sees being raped by the Tattooed Man. The progressing story increases the importance of the two mysterious soldiers, who are revealed as Henry Scudder and Management. Strange words of unknown meaning appear throughout the series. Variations of the phrase "Every Prophet in his House" are repeated, seemingly without context. Ben finds the repeating letter string TARAVATARAVA in a mineshaft, which he is later able to interpret as Avatar. Season 2 introduces the word Usher in particular relation to Brother Justin. Management repeats this term to Ben in two instances. After Management's death, Ben has sudden knowledge about Princes, Prophets and the Usher, even knowing to whom these terms apply, respectively. The sentence "Sofie is the Omega" is seen once, written across a mirror without further explanation. Sofie demonstrates powers and attributes similar to those of Ben and Brother Justin in the last Carnivàle episode.

The context for some of these events is provided by the (fictionally used) Gospel of Matthias, a book in Season 2 that connects the Templars to Ben's father. Written in archaic English, reminiscent of the King James Bible translation, it contains parts of Samson's Season 1 prologue, mentions the Avatara, and alludes to an apocalyptic passage in the Book of Revelation. It also contains etchings of a gnarled and bent tree, which in one image is attacked by a Knight Templar holding a knife. Wilfred Talbot Smith interprets this book to Brother Justin, quoting, "By the hand of the Prince, the Prophet dies. Upon his death, the Prince shall rise," and "[Behold the Usher. A dark heart dwells where branches meet.] Anointed dagger plunge thee deep." Management and Ben repeat these verses independently of Smith.

==== What is an Avatar? ====
As confirmed by Daniel Knauf and the Pitch Document, the Avatars of the current generation (at the end of Season 2) are Ben as the Creature of Light and Brother Justin as the Creature of Darkness. Justin is also the Usher, spiritually represented by the Tattooed Man. Their respective fathers were Avatars of the previous generation: Henry Scudder was the Creature of Darkness, and Lucius Belyakov (Management) was the Creature of Light. At each time, an Avatar's blood color mirrored his status. Ben's and Brother Justin's blood were red when they were Princes, and upon becoming Prophets, their blood turned into Vitae Divina (blue blood). Scudder's father Hilton was an Avatar of undisclosed nature. The mentalist of the carnival, Lodz, was merely a mortal who had once received Avataric skills from Scudder in exchange for his sense of sight.

Several women in Carnivàle are tied to Avatars, but only two have Avataric blood: Belyakov's daughter Iris is a Vectorus by definition, and Justin's daughter Sofie is the Omega. Although Sofie is two years older than Ben, her father's Avataric generation places her in the next Avataric generation. The other affected women are human mothers who began to suffer from mental illness or strange behavior after giving birth to an Avatar. Ben's mother Flora was a religious fanatic who would not touch her son. Scudder's mother Emma cut her eyes out and killed several of her family members the night Scudder was born. Sofie's mother Apollonia became catatonic after Sofie's birth. Justin's and his older sister Iris's mother receives no special mention in the series, but the Pitch Document mentions her chronic paranoid schizophrenia after Justin's birth. As far as known, none of these mothers became pregnant after giving birth to an Avatar.

Knauf hinted at more Avatars in a February 2005 chat: "What do Jesus, Caligula, Alexander the Great, Caesar, Buddha, Vlad the Impaler, Brother Justin, Ben Hawkins, Luscius [sic] Belyakov, Hilton Scudder, and Henry Scudder have in common?" The Pitch Document stated, "If an Avatar was dedicated to developing and mastering his power, he could direct it with the precision of a scalpel. Such was the case with many of the Prophets, with Buddha, Jesus and Mohammed, with Caligula and Vlad Dracul." In this early plot summary, Rasputin and the Borgias were Avatars as well. But like other Avatars in Carnivàle, none of these historical figures were explicitly revealed as such on the show.

==== The Tattooed Man and the tree ====
Storyboard sketch of the Tattooed Man.

A man with a tattooed tree on his chest and back is introduced in the opening minutes of Carnivàle's pilot episode, and appears in many other Avataric visions and dreams: in Ben's and Brother Justin's common recurring dreams chasing Henry Scudder in a cornfield, in Ben's microsleep-like visions, in Sofie's visions of the rape of her mother, and in an extended vision of Brother Justin foreshadowing his dark future. Ben encounters a little boy with a similar tree painted to his chest and back late in Season 1. Brother Justin finds this tree grown on a hill early in Season 2, which prompts him to get his chest and back tattooed accordingly. The tree is also depicted in the show's Gospel of Matthias book, in a painting at the Templar Hall in Loving, New Mexico, and on many images in the room of Templar chaplain Kerrigan. Management and Wilfred Talbot Smith imply the tree's significance for the resolution of Carnivàle.

Show creator Daniel Knauf stated that the tree in Carnivàle is the iconic Tree of Knowledge of Good and Evil in the Garden of Eden. Its implied meaning and power prompted him to place it on the Tattooed Man's chest because "this is where you will build your empire. This is what it all boils down, [...] and it just had a certain power." Played by Don Swayze, the Tattooed Man is often depicted without a focus on his face, although a few frames in the pilot episode show him played by Clancy Brown (Brother Justin). Knauf confirmed the Tattooed Man as the spiritual representation of the Usher of Destruction.

== Historical and cultural allusions ==
=== Dust Bowl ===
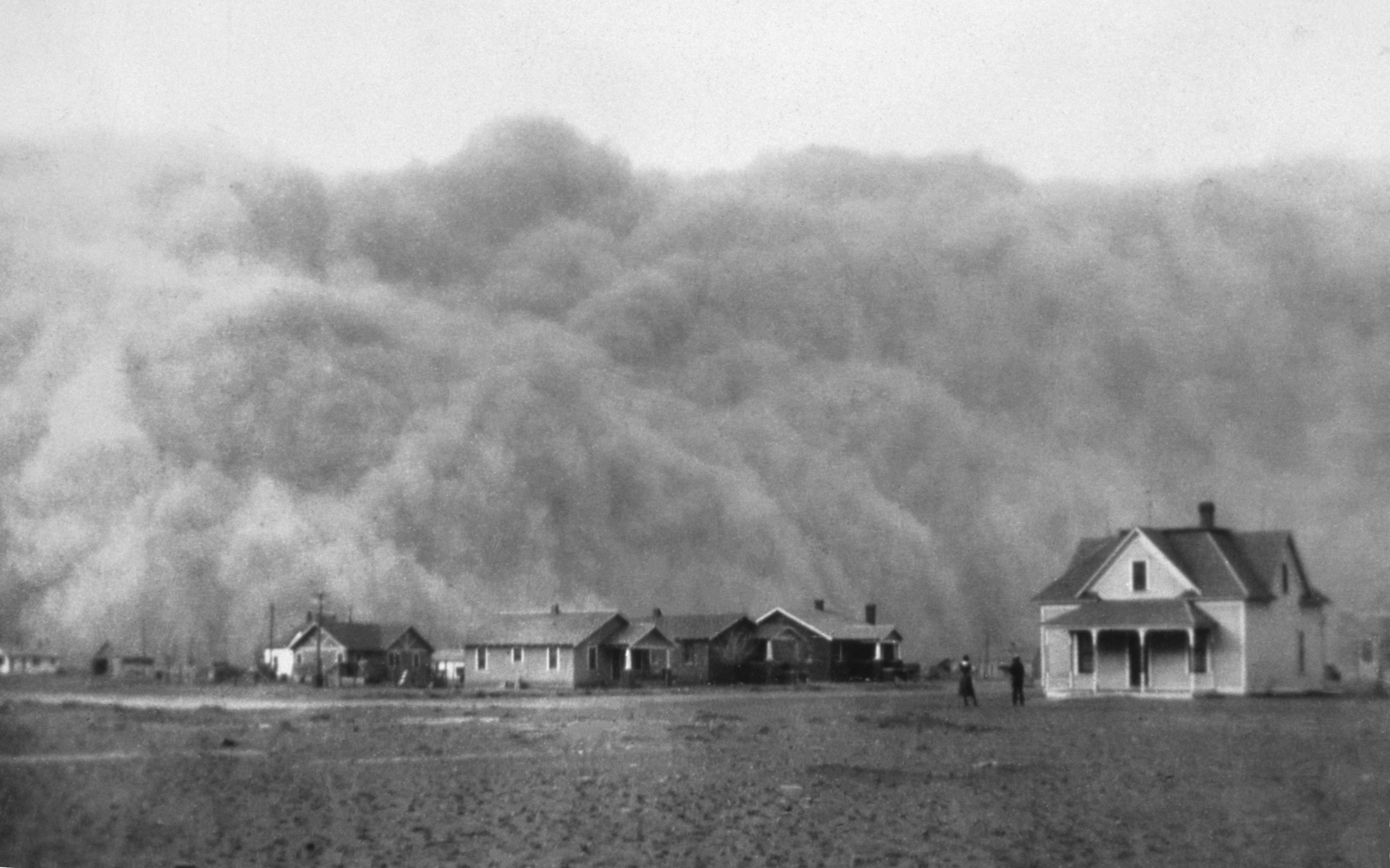
Dust storm in the Texas Dust Bowl, 1935.

"Drought and pestilence fester in the very heart of this great land. Titanic sandstorms, the likes of which man has not seen since the day of the prophets. I ask myself, what are these things?"

— Brother Justin Crowe in "Milfay"

The story of Carnivàle takes place in the mid-1930s during the worst of the Great Depression, a time of massive social and political upheaval. Unemployment rates were high, and European fascism was on the rise, in the years leading up to the Second World War. People in the Great Plains suffered from the effects of the Dust Bowl. Farmers often not only ran into debt and lost their properties but also risked their health; dust pneumonia was a common cause of death.

Carnivàle is a retrospective interpretation of these times. Okie Ben loses his mother and his farm to the dust when a carnival picks him up. While the carnival travels throughout the Southwestern United States, California preacher Brother Justin tends to the needs of Dust Bowl refugees, who slowly become his biggest supporters. Although Carnivàle replaces the real sociological-scientific reasons for the drought conditions with fantasy elements and the presence of the Devil, it still addresses the Dust Bowl situation repeatedly. Samson's catch phrases are variations of "Let's shake some dust!" The episode "Black Blizzard" focuses on Ben and the carnival coping with a major dust storm. Rain only occurs twice in the show. The first occurrence is when Ben and Sofie copulate; the writers wanted to highlight that Avataric sex "affects the heavens". The second is when Brother Justin forcibly takes the Boon from Henry Scudder in the episode "Cheyenne, WY".

=== Religion ===
A major part of Carnivàle's story is religion. Samson's prologue in the pilot episode is based on a few introduction paragraphs on the Pitch Document's cover sheet that were initially not planned to be performed . But whereas Samson's prologue only shortly mentions the Genesis creation narrative before introducing the fictional mythology, the original segment put more emphasis on the battle between God and Satan:

"Before the Beginning, after the great celestial war that rocked the very foundation of Heaven and Hell, God and Satan established an uneasy truce. Never again would they face each other in direct confrontation. So God created the Earth, inhabiting it with the crafty ape he called Man. And henceforth, to each generation was born a creature of Light and a creature of Darkness, and they would gather to them men of ilk nature and thus, by proxy, carry on the war between Good and Evil."

Show creator Daniel Knauf believed Carnivàle's religious aspects stemmed from the epic of good and evil as a major fabric of the 1930s, while executive producer Ronald D. Moore regarded religion as a way to express the struggle of good versus evil, faith, and the nature of humanity. Neither the audience nor the actors were given advice on how to interpret the show's biblical imagery. Clancy Brown, the actor who portrayed Brother Justin, did not know whether his character was the Creature of Light or Darkness during the first season. He however thought that the visions made Brother Justin believe to be on a righteous mission of God until late in the first season. Compared to Brother Justin, Brown stated he practiced religion in moderate ways.

Daniel Knauf felt that Brother Justin shares patterns with certain religious leaders who were often persecuted for their delusional visions. Historical figures like Father Coughlin, Aimee Semple McPherson and Brigham Young served as inspiration, although the writers refrained from re-telling their particular stories. Daniel Knauf originally thought of making Brother Justin a Protestant minister, but when the producers needed to decide on a specific religious affiliation, Knauf contested their plans to make him a Catholic priest. Knauf, a Catholic himself, settled on the Methodist denomination, which he perceived as significantly less clichéd, suspicious or controversial. When asked whether God had influenced him to write the story, Knauf replied no.

Carnivàle relies on other religious symbols and parallels for its mythology. The National Shrine of the Little Flower, funded by Father Coughlin in the 1930s, was an inspiration for the temple in Brother Justin's vision in the episode "Los Moscos". This vision foreshadows the world that Justin will potentially build as he comes to power as a radio preacher. The producers planned to use radio towers instead of regular steeples for the temple; the design also incorporated Eastern European domes and Western European cathedrals. In the same vision, the Tattooed Man appears near a tree that resembles the iconic Tree of Knowledge of Good and Evil, and implies that Justin is the Usher. According to Knauf, the Usher represents a "timeless character who shows up in all different cultures", and who is "there to usher in the Armageddon" as "the harbinger of End times".

=== Knights Templar ===
The Knights Templar symbol in Carnivàle.

Carnivàle introduces the Knights Templar, a medieval Christian military order, in the late Season 1 episode "Lonnigan, TX", where Ben meets the freak finder Phineas Boffo. When Ben comes in contact with Boffo's ring, he experiences a powerful series of visions of the Knights Templar practicing rituals, putting heads on spikes, and being burned at the stake. The ring bears a red-crossed symbol, and when Samson passes a trinket with the same symbol to Lodz, the mentalist has the same visions as Ben and falls to the floor chanting "in hoc signo vinces" ("in this sign you will conquer"). The Knights Templar remain a recurring subplot until Ben discovers the symbol's significance in early Season 2. The Lodge of the Benevolent Order of Templar has its last appearance in the mid-Season-2 episode "Old Cherry Blossom Road", where the escaped convict Varlyn Stroud uses it to track Ben. When Wilfred Talbot Smith asks for the location of the Saunière manuscript late in Season 2, Scudder answers that it is hidden in Rennes-le-Château.

Despite being of only tangential importance to the series' two seasons, the Knights Templar have an elaborate backstory that was left untold due to the cancellation. The Pitch Document described the fictional Order, then simply called the "Order Templar", as a fraternity of fellow travelers that was once charged by the Roman Catholic Church with locating and aiding the Avatars. Knauf said both Henry Scudder and his father Hilton were members of the Templars; Scudder was so because he wanted access to their knowledge and library. The Saunière manuscript would have been "mildly relevant" for the future storyline.

=== Trinity ===
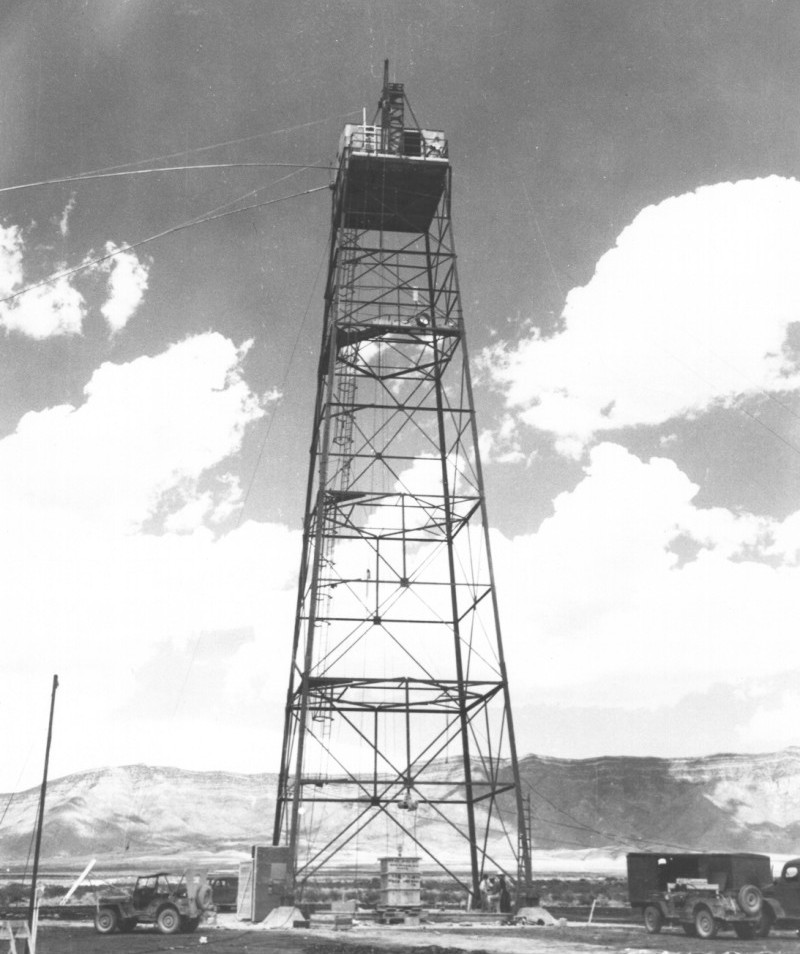
The real Trinity tower.

The Season 2 episode "Los Moscos" has Management urge Ben to seek Scudder; Ben needs to learn the name of the preacher of his dreams (Brother Justin) to prevent a future catastrophe. An induced vision transports Ben into a desert where he suddenly hears an alarm-like noise. A massive explosion occurs, followed by a rising mushroom cloud. When Ben opens his eyes from the blast of dust, Justin kneels in front of him and asks "Ye offspring of serpents, who warned you to flee from the wrath to come?" Ben drives past this location one episode later in "Alamogordo, NM". In a shared vision in the episode "Creed, OK", Ben and Sofie kiss in a desert, surrounded by bright light and swirling dust. Season 2 takes place in 1935.

Reviews interpreted these visions as Ben's challenge to find and defeat Brother Justin; Ben has to ultimately stop the creation of the atomic bomb as "the world's march towards doomsday." The Season 1 prologue already suggested this interpretation, mentioning "a false sun explod[ing] over Trinity," at which point "man forever traded away wonder for reason." The Trinity test near Alamogordo, New Mexico was humankind's first test of a nuclear weapon in 1945, and Daniel Knauf would have finished Carnivàle's six-year run with the explosion of an atomic bomb as the beginning of the "Age of Reason". Still, Knauf's story is "not about the deployment of the bomb, it's more about the invention of the bomb," with the focus "around Alamogordo and the Trinity test site rather than Hiroshima and Nagasaki." Much research was put into the visual effects of the explosion. Stock footage of the first beats of nuclear explosions and a self-created explosion of 300 gallons of gasoline were used for reference. The ground effects and blowing dust were created with combinations of volumetric computer graphics smoke, and the fireball of the nuclear explosion was built from Hubble images of the Sun. Knauf left the interpretation of the kiss vision open to both the characters and the audience.

=== Tarot divination ===
The tarot readings of fortunetellers Sofie and her mother Apollonia advance the plot significantly. Sofie's readings in the pilot episode induce visions in Ben that give insight into his healing powers of his childhood. Season 2 shows Sofie's attempts to leave her former job, which is repeatedly interrupted by tarot cards reappearing. Another of her readings sets Ben on a journey to Scudder, the man he has been looking for since the beginning of the series.

When incorporating tarot symbolism into the show, show creator Daniel Knauf started with the Rider–Waite tarot deck and then took liberties in interpretation. The same deck was used in the series and in several web games, as tarot divination played a significant part in Carnivàle's online marketing. The producers had wished to provide a "personalized, interactive tarot-card reading experience similar to what is depicted in the series". The official HBO website collaborated with RealNetworks to offer Fate: The Carnivàle Game, a downloadable game based on tarot symbolism available for trial and purchase.

Carnivàle's opening title sequence features tarot cards that are panned in and out of in camera perspective; these cards were digitally designed based on paintings and are not available for purchase. As the creative team behind the opening titles stated, it was their goal "to create a title sequence that grounded viewers in the mid-1930s, but that also allowed people to feel a larger presence of good and evil over all of time." The creators offered a detailed interpretation of the tarot cards in the opening titles, and covered topics like good and bad, heaven and hell, wars, and the age of science as the antireligion in the 1930s. The following list specifies the tarot cards featured in the opening sequence, the provided keywords and the used artwork.

- "The World" — Completion. Perfection. Eternal life. – The Last Judgment by Michelangelo.
- "Ace of Swords" — Ardent love. Ardent hate. A vanquisher is born. – Destruction of Leviathan by Gustave Doré.
- "Death" — Transition. Change. Death. – The Last Day of Pompeii by Karl Brullov.
- "King of Swords" — A powerful commander. A wise counselor. A judge. – St. Michael Victorious by Raphael.
- "Temperance" — Moderation. Balance. Harmony. – The Peasant Dance by Pieter Bruegel the Elder.
- "The Magician" — Originality. Confidence. Skill. – Crucifixion by Josse Lieferinxe.
- "The Tower" — Sudden change. Disruption. Downfall. – The Battle between the Romans and the Carthaginians by Jean Fouquet.
- "Judgement" — Renewal. Rebirth.
- "The Moon" — Deception. Disillusionment.
- "The Sun" — Success. Joy. – Creation of the Sun and Moon by Michelangelo.

== Reception, interpretation and legacy ==
Executive producer Ronald D. Moore was confident that Carnivàle was one of the most complicated shows on television, while show creator Daniel Knauf admitted that "you may not understand everything that goes on but it does make a certain sense." In stating that Carnivàle was meant to be a demanding show with a lot of subtext, Knauf refrained from giving explicit clues. He did not wish his intent as an author to supersede the viewer's interpretation.

=== Interpretations during the run of Carnivàle ===
"If Carnivàle asks a central question, it's this: What is the link between Hawkins and Crowe, and what do their dreams have to do with reality? Are these visions of the future, residue of the past, or an allegory for the present? [...] I found myself desperately wishing that [Michael J. Anderson (Samson) would start speaking backwards again], partly because then at least something in Carnivàle would make a little sense."

— Dennis Cass of Slate in reviewing the first two episodes

Reviewers of the first three episodes interpreted Carnivàle's story as being full of myth and allegory. The show was seen as more than just a human-scaled metaphor of good and evil, with the power of spirits as one of the show's strongest elements. Some reviewers were deeply confused and described almost everything as "mysterious" – the characters and their powers and abilities, characters and scenarios within visions, the whole carnival – wondering how it all fit together. The visions of the two main characters were shortly addressed, distinguishing between violent and benign visions, but parallels between the visions and the beings of good and evil were not necessarily drawn. The characters' stories were described as unfolding in "zig-zagging starts, moving back and forth in time and space, dropping oblique clues along the way."

Carnivàle's central premise was considered "cloudy", "unconventional", and filled with "convoluted symbolic interpretations of historical events" after Daniel Knauf had told TV critics that he regarded the 1930s as "the last great age of magic" being ended by an atomic bomb to herald the Age of Reason. Many reviews quoted and commented on Samson's prologue to explain both the apocalyptic premise and the mythology of the show. Some reviews asserted that the good and evil creatures described in the prologue were Ben and Justin, preparing for a final battle. Still, many reviews were reluctant to state who of the main characters was good and who was evil, aware that it might take some time until this question was answered for sure. Ben and his healing powers led most reviewers to believe that he was the good creature, and that Justin was a demon or at least a dangerous zealot who received instructions from either God or Satan. Some reviews described the question of Ben's parentage as one of the big puzzles and the show's driving mystery, but refrained from defining further details of the series. The lack of revelation of the characters' roles was apparent by the end of the first season, although critics expected Sofie to gain significance later in the story.

DVD reviews for Season 1 and previews for the Season 2 premiere had the advantage of retrospective on the first season, and some reviewers continued to consider the show's mythology convoluted, circuitous, "peek-a-boo" and silly. The significance of the prologue was emphasized again, while previous reviewers' character descriptions, the good-versus-evil theme and the assumed story merge were generally repeated. The good nature of Ben and evil nature of Brother Justin seemed clearer to most reviewers, with "many bizarre coincidences that seem to imply a deeper and more sinister connection" between the two main characters. Visions were summarized as disturbing and grotesque, dreams as cryptic and mysterious, and abilities as unexplainable. Henry Scudder was noted to be "connected to everything and everyone", and it was considered Ben's job to piece together the mystery of his own past. The events of early Season 2 were said to mark a shift in the story from mystery to journey, with Ben accepting and exploring his powers, while Brother Justin was seen completely embracing his evil nature. Reviewers regarded Sofie's turn in the final episode as an unexpected new threat in the story.

=== Reception and analysis of themes ===
Carnivàle was often compared to David Lynch's 1990s mystery TV series Twin Peaks and John Steinbeck's 1939 novel The Grapes of Wrath. Matt Roush of TV Guide called Carnivàle "the perfect show for those who thought Twin Peaks was too accessible", whereas the show reminded Salon.com's Heather Havrilesky of the "disappointment you feel as a kid when you come to the last few pages of The Grapes of Wrath." She argued that a "surreal Twin Peaks-style shockfest [...] hardly bears repeating," especially if it "avoid[s] the 'hugging and learning' of mainstream television [by serving up] such a steady diet of anguish and dashed hopes that viewers refuse to take the risk of making an emotional connection." Carnivàle, as The Australian stated, "seems to have been conceived in essentially literary terms" which "can sometimes work on the page but is deadly on the large screen, let alone a small one. It's almost like a biblical injunction against pretension on television." A reviewer admitted his temptation to dismiss the first season of Carnivàle as "too artsy and esoteric" because his lack of involvement prevented him from understanding "what the heck was going on, [which] can be a problem for a dramatic television series." TV Zone however considered Carnivàle "a series like no other and [...] the fact that it is so open to interpretation surprisingly proves to be one of its greatest strengths." Carnivàle was lauded for bringing "the hopelessness of the Great Depression to life" and for being among the first TV shows to show "unmitigated pain and disappointment", but reviewers were not confident that viewers would find the "slowly unfolding sadness" appealing over long or would have the patience or endurance to find out the meaning of the show.

=== Fate and legacy of the mythological storytelling of Carnivàle ===
Viewership did drop significantly in Season 2, and Carnivàle was cancelled in 2005 after two of six planned seasons. In a post-cancellation interview, Daniel Knauf was positive that someone would let him finish his story someday, if not as a television series, then possibly as a series of features or graphic novels. Knauf approached Marvel Comics to continue the future Carnivàle storyline that he had kept to himself. They seemed interested, but HBO, who own the show and the characters, would not confer their rights. During the 2007 Writers Guild of America strike, Knauf stated that "an idiosyncratic show like Carnivàle would never be greenlit today," and claimed that present-day television included a high percentage of "talking heads" with "the vast majority of television writers [not being] visual storytellers." Enjoying his creative freedom as graphic storyteller, he has considered directing his efforts away from television series creation.

In 2008, Alessandra Stanley of the Australian newspaper The Age remembered Carnivàle as a "smart, ambitious series that move[s] unusual characters around an unfamiliar setting imaginatively," while The A.V. Club called the show "a fantastically rich series with a frustratingly dense mythology".
