= Cameron Clapp =

American athlete (born 1986)

- Born: February 18, 1986 (age 40)
- Occupations: motivational speaker, actor, Athlete
- Awards: Shining Star Award (2005)

Cameron Clapp (born February 18, 1986) is an American athlete. As a triple amputee, he has become a motivational speaker, mentor to young amputees, and amputee activist. He is also an actor.

He has been characterized as the "quintessential California teenager" for "his blond hair, buff torso, and megawatt smile" albeit "on a pair of shiny, state-of-the-art robotic legs."

On February 13, 2024, Clapp was arrested by the Federal Bureau of Investigation in Los Angeles for his role in the January 6 United States Capitol attack in Washington, D.C. Clapp was sentenced to probation on November 4, 2024. On January 20, 2025, the first day of the second presidency of Donald Trump, Clapp received a federal pardon along with nearly every other participant in the riot as part of Trump's pardon of January 6 United States Capitol attack defendants.

== Amputation ==
=== Accident and recovery ===
On September 15, 2001, at the age of 15, Clapp was hit by a high-speed Union Pacific freight train. He had been drinking at a ceremony commemorating victims of the September 11 attacks and was unable to remember passing out on a railroad track near his home in Atascadero, California. His blood alcohol content was found to be .229. His injuries required the amputation of both his legs above his knees and his right arm slightly below his shoulder.

Clapp underwent extensive rehabilitation at the Hanger Clinic. He mastered independent walking only five months after the accident, an exceptional accomplishment. He is quoted as saying, "I left the wheelchair five months after the accident and I don't want to have to use it again."

=== Prosthetics ===
Clapp has used a series of increasingly advanced prosthetic limbs.

He has three different sets of specialized prosthetic legs: one for walking, one for running, and one for swimming.

=== Amputee activism ===
Clapp has become a mentor and inspiration for amputees. He is a certified peer visitor with the Amputee Coalition of America. He advocates breakthrough technologies as a means of shattering the barriers between the disabled and the mainstream.

Clapp has devoted hundreds of hours in counseling young amputees as to the endless possibilities of attaining mainstream functionality after life-altering loss of limbs. As part of this effort, he attends Camp No Limits in Maine, and mentors amputees such as Charlotte Cleverley-Bisman.

His amputee activism has included extensive visitation and counseling of returning veterans of the Iraq War and the War in Afghanistan who have sustained the loss of limbs. This includes multiple appearances at Walter Reed Army Medical Center's "Warriors in Transition" program.

In November 2005 he was honored with a Shining Star award at the 58th annual Shining Star Awards Gala, an honor previously bestowed upon Christopher Reeve and Ray Charles. Sponsored by Just One Break Inc. (JOB), a national nonprofit organization founded in part by Eleanor Roosevelt in 1947 to promote the employment of disabled World War II service veterans, the award "recognize[s] individuals and organizations whose achievements and/or support further the potential of people with disabilities, either by example or by supporting JOB in its mission of helping qualified applicants obtain sustainable employment."

== Athletics ==
Before the accident Clapp had been an active athlete.

He has since participated in numerous athletic competitions for amputees. He competed in the University of Central Oklahoma's Endeavor Games from 2002 to 2005. Cameron's gold and silver medal accomplishments include running 100 meters in only 18 seconds and swimming 20 laps.

He aspires to compete in the Paralympic Games, although he jokes that "there aren't enough athletes in my category. I'm the only triple amputee that runs!"

He is additionally an accomplished golfer.

== Acting career ==
Clapp's acting career has spanned television and film.

In 2005 his accident and miraculous recovery was featured on the Discovery Channel series Medical Incredible.

His television roles have included Jake, the no-legged boyfriend of the one-legged Didi (played by Tracy Ashton) in NBC's My Name Is Earl. He also appeared in HBO's Carnivàle as the character of Management.

He portrayed a wounded service member in the 2008 feature film Stop-Loss. He also played the role of "The Total Package" in Comedy Central's Workaholics.

== Legal issues ==
On February 13, 2024, Clapp was arrested in Los Angeles by the FBI for his participation in the January 6 United States Capitol attack. On November 4, 2024, Clapp was sentenced to probation. On January 20, 2025, the first day of the second presidency of Donald Trump, Clapp was pardoned along with nearly every other participant in the riot.

== Personal life ==
Cameron Clapp was born on February 18, 1986, along with an identical twin brother named Jesse. Clapp lived in Arroyo Grande, California. On January 2, 2008, Jesse was found dead from a drug overdose in a home in Grover Beach, California.

== See also ==
- List of cases of the January 6 United States Capitol attack (A-F)
- Criminal proceedings in the January 6 United States Capitol attack
- List of people granted executive clemency in the second Trump presidency
