= Gospel of Matthias =

Lost text of New Testament apocrypha

The Gospel of Matthias is a lost text from the New Testament apocrypha, ascribed to Matthias, the apostle chosen by lots to replace Judas Iscariot (Acts 1:15–26). The content has been surmised from various descriptions of it in ancient works by Church Fathers. There is too little evidence to decide whether a Traditions of Matthias is the same work, according to J.B. Matthews, The Anchor Bible Dictionary (IV:644).

== Historical references ==
This Gospel is lost, but Clement of Alexandria while describing the Nicolaitanes, quotes a sentence ascribed to Matthias urging asceticism: "we must combat our flesh, set no value upon it, and concede to it nothing that can flatter it, but rather increase the growth of our soul by faith and knowledge". The Gospel of Matthias was mentioned by Origen of Alexandria; by Eusebius, who attributes it to heretics; by Jerome, and in the Decretum Gelasianum which declares it apocryphal. It comes at the end of the list of the Biblical Canon in the Codex Baroccianus 206, formerly in the library of Francesco Barozzi ("Barocius") of Venice.

This lost gospel is probably the document whence Clement of Alexandria quoted several passages, saying that they were borrowed from the traditions of Matthias, Paradoseis, the testimony of which he claimed to have been invoked by the heretics Valentinus, Marcion, and Basilides. According to Philosophoumena, VII.20, Basilides quoted apocryphal discourses that he attributed to Matthias. These three writings: the Gospel, the Traditions, and the apocryphal Discourses were reckoned, by Theodor Zahn, as referring to a single work. But Adolf von Harnack denied this identification.

== In popular culture ==
A fictional copy of the gospel is used in the HBO series Carnivàle, where it describes the show's mythological creatures, the Usher of Destruction and Avatara. A fictionalized version of the gospel is also the subject of Wilton Barnhardt's 1993 novel, Gospel: a novel. The novel relates the search for and finding of Matthias' lost work. The Gospel of Matthias also serves as a core finding in the book, "The Secret of Altamura" and as the central fact in "The Paletti Notebook" by Dick Rosano.

== See also ==
- List of Gospels
