= Dust pneumonia =

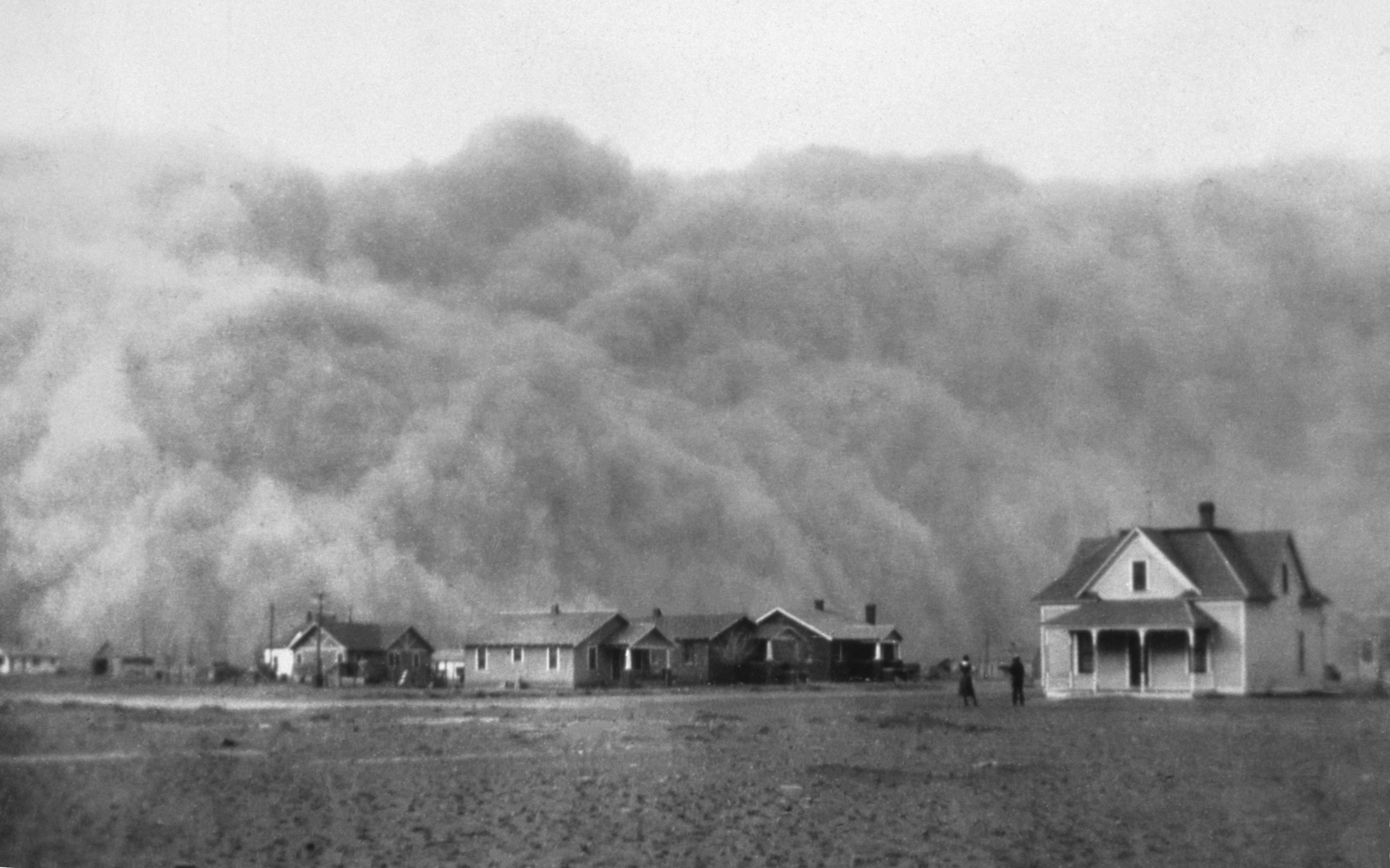
- A Dust Bowl-era dust storm in Texas (1935)
- Specialty: Pulmonology

Dust pneumonia describes disorders caused by excessive exposure to dust storms, particularly during the Dust Bowl in the United States. A form of pneumonia, dust pneumonia results when the lungs are filled with dust, inflaming the alveoli.

Symptoms of dust pneumonia include high fever, chest pain, difficulty in breathing, and coughing. With dust pneumonia, dust settles all the way into the alveoli of the lungs, stopping the cilia from moving and preventing the lungs from ever clearing themselves.

People who had dust pneumonia often died. There are no official death rates published for the Great Plains in the 1930s. In 1935, dozens of people died in Kansas from dust pneumonia. Red Cross volunteers made and distributed thousands of dust masks, although some farmers and other people in the affected areas refused to wear them.

== In popular culture ==
Dust pneumonia was featured in the work of several musicians and artists of the day, such as Woody Guthrie's song "Dust Pneumonia Blues".

== See also ==
- Silicosis – Occupational lung disease caused by inhalation of crystalline silica
- Dust storm – Meteorological phenomenon common in arid and semi-arid regions
- Pneumonitis – General inflammation of lung tissue
