= Milfay, Oklahoma =

- Unincorporated community
- Milfay Post Office, November 2026

- Location within the state of Oklahoma Milfay (the United States)
- Coordinates: 35°45′06″N 96°33′33″W
- Country: United States
- State: Oklahoma
- County: Creek

Area
  - Total: 0.64 sq mi (1.66 km^{2})
  - Land: 0.63 sq mi (1.64 km^{2})
  - Water: 0.0039 sq mi (0.01 km^{2})
- Elevation: 837 ft (255 m)

Population (2020)
  - Total: 74
  - Density: 116.8/sq mi (45.11/km^{2})
- Time zone: UTC-6 (Central (CST))
  - Summer (DST): UTC-5 (CDT)
- FIPS code: 40-48450
- GNIS feature ID: 2805341

Milfay is a small unincorporated community in Creek County, Oklahoma, United States, about five and a half miles east of Stroud. As of the 2020 census, Milfay had a population of 74. The post office was established December 14, 1911. The community was named after Charles Mills and Edward Fay, two railroad officials.

Milfay First Baptist Church, November 2026

== Demographics ==
Historical population
Census	Pop.	Note	%±
2020	74		—
U.S. Decennial Census

=== 2020 census ===
As of the 2020 census, Milfay had a population of 74. The median age was 48.0 years. 18.9% of residents were under the age of 18 and 12.2% of residents were 65 years of age or older. For every 100 females there were 131.2 males, and for every 100 females age 18 and over there were 114.3 males age 18 and over.

0.0% of residents lived in urban areas, while 100.0% lived in rural areas.

There were 30 households in Milfay, of which 26.7% had children under the age of 18 living in them. Of all households, 40.0% were married-couple households, 30.0% were households with a male householder and no spouse or partner present, and 26.7% were households with a female householder and no spouse or partner present. About 46.6% of all households were made up of individuals and 3.3% had someone living alone who was 65 years of age or older.

There were 38 housing units, of which 21.1% were vacant. The homeowner vacancy rate was 0.0% and the rental vacancy rate was 0.0%.

Racial composition as of the 2020 census
Race	Number	Percent
White	51	68.9%
Black or African American	2	2.7%
American Indian and Alaska Native	2	2.7%
Asian	0	0.0%
Native Hawaiian and Other Pacific Islander	0	0.0%
Some other race	3	4.1%
Two or more races	16	21.6%
Hispanic or Latino (of any race)	5	6.8%
