= Audrey Rose =

The phrase Audrey Rose may refer to:

- Audrey Rose (novel), a novel by Frank de Felitta
- Audrey Rose (film), a film directed by Robert Wise, adapted from the de Felitta novel
- For Love of Audrey Rose, the sequel to the novel Audrey Rose
