= Stephen J. Rivele =

American film producer and screenwriter (1949–2024)

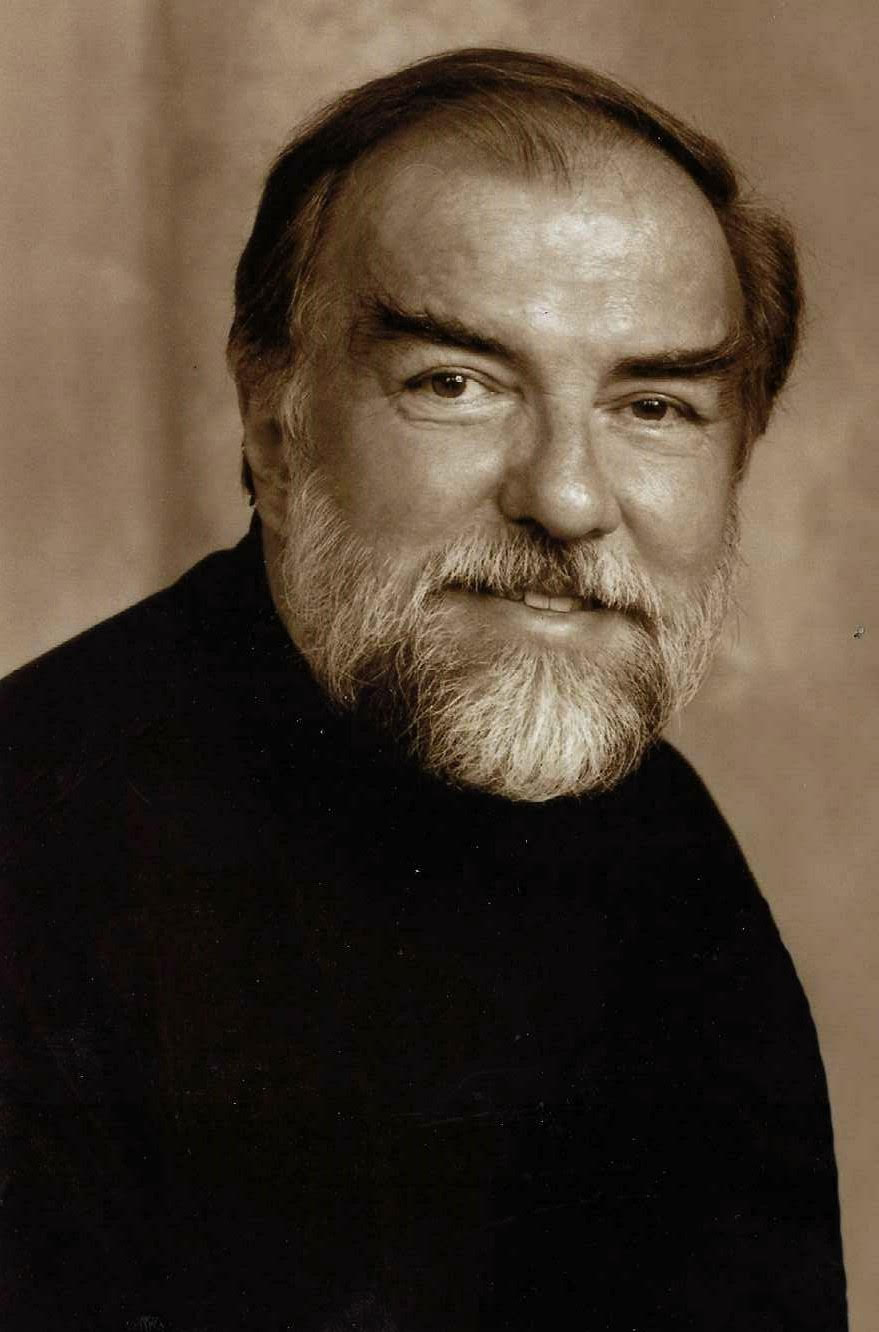
- Born: May 6, 1949; Philadelphia, Pennsylvania, U.S.
- Died: May 17, 2024 (aged 75); Pasadena, California, U.S.
- Occupation(s): Film producer, screenwriter, novelist, poet

Stephen J. Rivele (May 6, 1949 – May 17, 2024) was an American film producer and screenwriter. He was nominated for an Academy Award in the category Best Original Screenplay for the film Nixon. His nomination was shared with Oliver Stone and Christopher Wilkinson.

== Early life and education ==
Stephen was born in Philadelphia on May 6, 1949. He attended West Catholic High School, where he graduated as valedictorian of his class. Rivele also became active in the civil rights movement. In 1967, he attended a fundraising event for the SCLC, where he shook the hand of the featured speaker, Dr. Martin Luther King Jr.

Rivele graduated from St. Joseph’s University and the University of Montpellier in France, and later from Swarthmore College. He then worked with the Jesuit Mission in the Congo, earning a certificate in Tropical Agriculture from the Ecole Agronomique, where he started farms and cattle cooperatives in and around Kinshasa.

In 1975, he became the first American student accepted at the Paris Film Conservatory. He also studied with Eric Rohmer at the University of Paris, receiving a French master’s of fine arts degree in film directing.

== Career ==
Upon returning home, he founded the Performing Arts Theater with actor Jon Polito, writing and directing plays produced in Philadelphia, New York, and London. During this period, he also worked as a staff photographer for the Philadelphia Eagles, documenting their 1977 season.

After working on films in New York City, he moved to Los Angeles, where he wrote and directed several dozen documentaries. His films won awards at festivals and competitions around the world.

Rivele also began writing magazine articles based on his growing fascination with the JFK assassination. His groundbreaking work on the subject led to his first book, Death and Discovery. His second book, The Plumber, was a best-seller and sold to Universal Pictures.

After his JFK book was optioned, he began a thirty-year writing partnership with Christopher Wilkinson. Together, they wrote Nixon, Ali, Copying Beethoven, Miles Ahead, Pawn Sacrifice, and Birth of the Dragon, in addition to uncredited rewrites on Bohemian Rhapsody, A Star is Born, Moneyball, and All Eyez on Me.

Throughout his screenwriting career, Stephen continued to write books and plays. His published works include Lt. Ramsey’s War, Dark Genius, The Mothershed Case, A Booke of Days, Vice, Singer in the Land of Night, and a collection of poems, Desert Songs. His play, The Wes and Jane Show, was chosen by the LA Times as one of the best theatrical events of the year and was featured at the LA Festival and was performed at the Dorothy Chandler in LA.

== Death ==
Rivele died in his sleep at his home in Pasadena, California, on May 17, 2024, at the age of 75.

At the 97th Academy Awards, his name was mentioned in the In Memoriam section.

== Selected filmography ==
- Nixon (1995)
- Ali (2001)
- Copying Beethoven (2006)
- Like Dandelion Dust (2009)
- Pawn Sacrifice (2014)
- Miles Ahead (2015)
- Birth of the Dragon (2016)
