= Copying Beethoven =

- Theatrical release poster
- Directed by: Agnieszka Holland
- Written by: Stephen J. Rivele; Christopher Wilkinson
- Produced by: Sidney Kimmel; Stephen J. Rivele; Michael Taylor; Christopher Wilkinson
- Starring: Ed Harris; Diane Kruger
- Cinematography: Ashley Rowe
- Edited by: Alex Mackie
- Music by: Antoni Łazarkiewicz
- Production companies: Metro-Goldwyn-Mayer Pictures; Sidney Kimmel Entertainment; VIP Medienfonds 2
- Distributed by: MGM Distribution Co. (United States); Myriad Pictures (International)
- Release date: November 10, 2006
- Running time: 104 minutes
- Countries: United States; Germany; Hungary
- Language: English
- Box office: $6.1 million

Copying Beethoven is a 2006 dramatic film released by Metro-Goldwyn-Mayer Pictures and directed by Agnieszka Holland which gives a fictionalized take on the triumphs and heartaches of Ludwig van Beethoven's last years.

== Plot ==
The film starts off in the year 1827 with Beethoven dying in his bed during a thunderstorm and his copyist Anna Holtz arrived on time to see him and tell she finally heard his fugue before he passes.

The story then shifts back to 1824 as Beethoven is finishing his Ninth Symphony. He is plagued by deafness, loneliness, and personal trauma. A new copyist, Anna Holtz, is engaged to help the composer finish preparing the score of his symphony for the first performance. Anna is a young conservatory student and aspiring composer. Her understanding of his work is such that she corrects mistakes he has made (the mistakes were made deliberately), while her personality opens a door into his private world. Beethoven is initially skeptical, but he slowly comes to trust Anna's assistance and eventually grows to rely on her and view her with respect, and even with admiration.

Anna Holtz (as Beethoven always refers to her) is sent to be his copyist, but due to her sex, is constantly thought less of, and is mistaken for a serving girl, maid, and even a prostitute. Pushing past, though quite unhappily, from these assumptions, Anna proves herself to Beethoven, not only as a copyist, but also as his friend, and something of his protégé and heir as far as he is concerned. He gains much admiration of her after she assists him by directing him, hidden among his musicians (although she can be seen from the top seats), as he simultaneously copies her movements to direct the orchestra during what would turn out to be his final concert on stage. Though Anna agreed to her romantic interest, Martin Bauer, that she would help him complete his symphony, and then immediately leave after showing him her work, she instead continues to assist him as his copyist.

After seeing the admiration she has gained from Beethoven, Anna proceeds to show him a piece of music that she composed. Beethoven tactlessly and unknowingly insults her. Anna, more than ready not to return, continues to stay with her great-aunt and the nuns at the convent. Anna is surprised when Beethoven, desperate to keep Anna in his employment and under his tutelage, bursts into the convent and begs Anna, on his knees, to come back and work as his equal on both of their music. He begins to teach her about Romanticism, music, and mostly, how to allow her artistic side freedom. Continuing his infuriating behavior, Beethoven smashes the model of Martin's bridge he built for an engineer's competition, thereby ruining Martin as well. Anna, angry, confronts Beethoven, asking him if he had ever considered that she loved Martin. Beethoven replies, "You don't love him." Upon hearing this, Anna angrily asks if she is supposed to love Beethoven instead. Beethoven again replies, "No. You want to be me." From here, Anna agrees that Beethoven did the right thing, and continues to work with him, pushing him past his hardships and failures, and then staying by his bedside until he died (on March 26, 1827). The film ends with Anna finally embracing herself as an artist, unique from all other composers, including Beethoven, and readying herself for a promising future.

== Cast ==
- Ed Harris as Ludwig van Beethoven
- Diane Kruger as Anna Holtz
- Matthew Goode as Martin Bauer
- Phyllida Law as Mother Canisius
- Joe Anderson as Karl van Beethoven
- Ralph Riach as Wenzel Schlemmer
- Bill Stewart as Rudy

== Artistic license ==
The working manuscript of the score of Beethoven's Ninth Symphony is attributed to two copyists, both of whom were male, not a single female as depicted in the film. The character of Anna Holtz is likely based at least partially on Karl Holtz, a young violinist and copyist who befriended Beethoven during the final few years of the composer's life and is said to have influenced decisions on pieces such as the Große Fuge.

The violinist Joseph Böhm recalled that for the premiere of the ninth symphony, although "Beethoven himself conducted... the actual direction was in [another's] hands". Further, it is recorded that at the end of the performance one of the soloists (Caroline Unger) guided Beethoven to turn around and see the applause, so this phase of his life is rich with opportunities to embroider to create a storyline suitable for modern retelling.

== Reception ==
=== Critical response ===
Copying Beethoven has an approval rating of 28% on review aggregator website Rotten Tomatoes, based on 81 reviews, and an average rating of 4.8/10. The website's critical consensus states, "A pretentious historical drama that's ultimately a drag, despite Ed Harris' powerful performance". Metacritic assigned the film a weighted average score of 59 out of 100, based on 20 critics, indicating "mixed or average reviews". David Jenkins of Time Out gave 2 out of 5 stars.
