= Miles Ahead (film) =

2015 film by Don Cheadle

- Theatrical release poster
- Directed by: Don Cheadle
- Screenplay by: Steven Baigelman; Don Cheadle
- Story by: Steven Baigleman; Don Cheadle; Stephen J. Rivele; Christopher Wilkinson
- Produced by: Darryl Porter; Vince Wilburn; Daniel Wagner; Robert Ogden Barnum; Don Cheadle; Pamela Hirsch; Lenore Zerman
- Starring: Don Cheadle; Ewan McGregor; Emayatzy Corinealdi; Lakeith Lee Stanfield; Michael Stuhlbarg
- Cinematography: Roberto Schaefer
- Edited by: John Axelrad; Kayla M. Emter
- Music by: Robert Glasper
- Production companies: Bifrost Pictures; Miles Davis Properties, LLC; IM Global; Sobini Films; Yellowsaw Productions Limited; Crescendo Productions
- Distributed by: Sony Pictures Classics
- Release dates: October 11, 2015 (NYFF); April 1, 2016 (United States)
- Running time: 100 minutes
- Country: United States
- Language: English
- Box office: $5.1 million

Miles Ahead is a 2015 American biographical-drama film directed by Don Cheadle in his feature directorial debut, which Cheadle co-wrote with Steven Baigelman, Stephen J. Rivele, and Christopher Wilkinson, which interprets the life and compositions of jazz musician Miles Davis. The film stars Cheadle, Emayatzy Corinealdi, and Ewan McGregor, and closed the New York Film Festival on October 11, 2015. The film takes its title from Davis's 1957 album.

Cheadle took a free-form approach to the film's narrative. Skipping around in time, it depicts Davis' attempts to get his career back on track following a period of inactivity and drug addiction in the 1970s, fictional adventures with a journalist (played by McGregor) who wants to profile him, and his troubled marriage to a former dancer (Corinealdi). The film's score covers, in non-linear fashion, Davis' actual recordings throughout his career, beginning with Agharta (1975) before jumping back and forth in scenes featuring Kind of Blue (1959), Someday My Prince Will Come (1961), Bitches Brew (1970), and We Want Miles (1981), among others.

Miles Ahead received mostly positive reviews from critics. Reviewers generally praised Cheadle's direction and performance, although some were critical of the plot. The film has grossed over $5 million.

== Plot synopsis ==
Adapted from Sony Classics

In the midst of a prolific career, Miles Davis disappears from public view for a period of five years in the late 1970s. He lives in isolation while dealing with chronic pain from a deteriorating hip, a musical voice inhibited and numbed by drugs and painkillers, and traumatic memories of his past. A Scottish music reporter, Dave Braden, forces his way into Davis' house and, over the next couple of days, the two men unwittingly embark on an adventure to recover a stolen tape recording of the musician's most recent compositions.

Davis' mercurial behavior is fueled by memories of his failed nine-year marriage (1959–1968) to the talented and beautiful dancer Frances Taylor. During their romance and subsequent marriage, Frances served as Davis' muse. It was during this period that he released several of his signature recordings, including Sketches of Spain (1960) and Someday My Prince Will Come (1961). The marriage was marked by infidelity and abuse, however, and Frances was forced to flee for her own safety as Miles' mental and physical health deteriorated. By the late 1970s, plagued by years of regret and loss, Davis flirts with self-destruction until he finds redemption in his music.

== Cast ==
- Don Cheadle as Miles Davis
- Emayatzy Corinealdi as Frances Taylor
- Ewan McGregor as Dave Braden
- Michael Stuhlbarg as Harper Hamilton
- LaKeith Stanfield as Junior
- Austin Lyon as Justin
- Jeffrey Grover as Gil Evans
- Joshua Jessen as Bill Evans
- Theron Brown as Herbie Hancock
- JT Thigpen as Paul Chambers
- David Kettlehake as Cab Driver
- Mark Angel II as Driver and Background Pedestrian
- Derek Snow as Harold Lovett, Miles' lawyer
- Jon "Swing" McHale as himself
- Morgan Wolk as Erica
- Mark Turkeltaub as Cop #1
- John Griffin as Cop #2
- Mike Dennis as Beat Cop

=== "Live Concert Band" ===
- Gary Clark Jr., guitar, as himself
- Herbie Hancock, keyboard, as himself
- Esperanza Spalding, electric bass, as herself
- Robert Glasper, keyboard, as himself
- Wayne Shorter, saxophone, as himself
- Antonio Sánchez, drums, as himself
- Keyon Harrold, trumpeter, plays on the soundtrack only. His part is mimed by Don Cheadle in the "Live Concert Band" section at the end of the film.

== Production ==
Cheadle originally was drawn to the project to explore the creative process in the approach to composition used by Miles Davis over the many years of his career. According to Cheadle at the Sundance Film Festival debut of the film, the approach to the film was not to produce a biopic but to create plausible though largely fictional vignettes of Davis' life that interpreted the creative process Davis used in the composition of his music.

"Agharta's what we start with in the movie. Our point of departure is the silent period, the five years in which Miles didn't really play — '75 to '79. I believe his music got to a place where he pushed it as far as he could. He'd been so prolific and had followed that muse wherever it went. I know he was exhausted at that point. Not just musically but physically and emotionally. If you're on that sort of train where you've got to keep coming up with the next thing — I can imagine how exhausting that can be."

— Cheadle, Rolling Stone interview

The idea for Cheadle to star in a film about Miles Davis began when he was auditioning for Ali, and it was suggested by writer Chris Wilkenson, noting that he knew the Davis family. Cheadle was interested although he didn't seriously consider it until 2006. That year, when Miles Davis was being inducted into the Rock and Roll Hall of Fame, Davis' nephew stated that Cheadle was the only person who could play Miles and that a film was coming with him starring. At the time there were no actual plans for the movie and the comments came to Cheadle as a surprise.

Intrigued by the comments, however, Cheadle met with the Davis family, who pitched him a variety of concepts, none of which interested him. Cheadle finally brought up the concept of portraying Davis as a "gangster", based on his life in 1945 and the 1970s. The family approved this concept, and Cheadle soon realized that he was the only one with the vision to write and direct the film this way. The working title for the film was originally Kill the Trumpet Player.

The score for Miles Ahead used music from Davis's recording career, opening the film with "Prelude (Part 2)" from Davis' 1975 album Agharta. This transitioned into other periods of his music career, including recordings from Porgy and Bess and Kind of Blue in 1959, Nefertiti and Filles de Kilimanjaro in 1968, Bitches Brew and the Jack Johnson sessions from 1969 to 70, the 1974 Dark Magus performance, and We Want Miles (1981). Cheadle explained to Billboard magazine about using this non-linear narrative with Davis' music: "I didn't want to be stuck with one period of his music. I think had we told it in a way that was chronological, was cradle to grave, was standard telling, we would've been pigeonholed into these moments that coincided with the music, and they would've all been given short shrift."

Cheadle has said the casting of Ewan McGregor, who plays a journalist in the film, was partly because the actor had a high box-office appeal in territories outside North America: "I could have cast a huge French actor, or an Asian actor who's big in Japan, China, and try to make it work for that. Because it's all about selling foreign. No needle moved until we cast Ewan McGregor". The financing of the film required multiple sources including crowdfunding. Cheadle said: "We crowdfunded via Indiegogo, deferred payment, I put money in myself. Kevin Hart, Pras, my producer's cousin, my other producer's friend put money in. It was just like that kind of a situation".

Filming began on July 7, 2014 in Cincinnati, Ohio, and the first film's first promotional photo was released. Filming wrapped on August 16, 2014.

== Release and reception ==
In August 2015, Sony Pictures Classics acquired distribution rights outside the United Kingdom, Ireland, South Korea, the Middle East, Hong Kong, Taiwan, Portugal, Switzerland, former Yugoslavia and Israel to Miles Ahead. The film had its world premiere at the New York Film Festival on October 10, 2015. It was released in the United States on limited theater on April 1, 2016 and wide expansion on April 22, grossing $2.6 million in the United States and Canada and $2.5 million in other territories for a worldwide total of $5.1 million.

Miles Ahead received generally positive reviews from critics. Metacritic, which assigns a rating in the 0–100 range based on reviews from top mainstream publications, calculated an average score of 64, based on 39 reviews. As of June 2020, the film holds a 74% approval rating on Rotten Tomatoes, based on 185 reviews with an average rating of 6.41/10; the site's consensus reads, "Miles Ahead is worth watching for Don Cheadle's strong work on both sides of the camera, even if this unconventional biopic doesn't quite capture its subject's timeless appeal".

In The New York Times, Manohla Dargis wrote that while Davis purists may complain about the imagined sequences in the film, "they'll...miss the pleasure and point of this playfully impressionistic movie." She was particularly impressed by Cheadle's ability to shift between "times, moods and modes effortlessly". Chicago Sun-Times critic Richard Roeper gave Miles Ahead three out of four stars and found most of it silly but often engrossing, crediting Cheadle for attempting to make a unique music biopic while giving "a brilliant performance worthy of an Oscar nomination". In a less enthusiastic review, Kenneth Turan from the Los Angeles Times stated the only "fully realized" characters played by Cheadle and Corinealdi were surrounded by a plot he deemed clichéd, unsophisticated, and forgettable. Rex Reed was more critical in a one-star review for The New York Observer, writing that it was overwhelmingly plagued by "hyperbole and innuendo" while taking issue with Cheadle's depiction of Davis and his life: "According to the jazz musicians I know, he was unpredictable and borderline crazy, but nothing like the moody, unhinged and dangerous stray bullet depicted here."

== Soundtrack ==
- See Miles Ahead (soundtrack)

== See also ==
- List of black films of the 2010s
