= Wicked City (2015 TV series) =

American drama TV series (2015)

- Genre: Procedural drama; Erotic thriller
- Created by: Steven Baigelman
- Starring: Jeremy Sisto; Taissa Farmiga; Gabriel Luna; Jaime Ray Newman; Evan Ross; Ed Westwick; Anne Winters; Karolina Wydra; Erika Christensen
- Composer: Brian Transeau (BT)
- Country of origin: United States
- Original language: English
- No. of seasons: 1
- No. of episodes: 8

Production
- Executive producers: Steven Baigelman; Amy B. Harris; Laurie Zaks; Todd Lieberman; David Hoberman; Jon Cassar
- Producer: Robert D. Simon
- Production locations: Los Angeles, California
- Cinematography: Dave Perkal; Eric Steelberg ("Pilot")
- Editors: Petro Cecchini; Kelley Dixon; Amy E. Duddleston
- Camera setup: Single camera
- Running time: 42 minutes
- Production companies: ABC Studios; Mandeville Television

Original release
- Network: ABC
- Release: October 27 – December 15, 2015

Wicked City is an American procedural drama television series created by Steven Baigelman for the broadcast network ABC. The series aired from October 27, 2015, to December 15, 2015. and focused on two LAPD detectives (Jeremy Sisto and Gabriel Luna) as they search for a pair of romantically linked serial killers (Ed Westwick and Erika Christensen) terrorizing the Sunset Strip. The main cast also includes Taissa Farmiga, Karolina Wydra, Evan Ross, Anne Winters, and Jaime Ray Newman.

On November 13, 2015, after airing only three episodes, ABC announced Wicked City had been cancelled, pulling the series from its fall schedule and stopping production following the completion of the eighth episode. The remaining episodes were made available by Hulu on December 22, 2015, with the finale being released on December 30, 2015.

== Plot ==
In 1982 Los Angeles, police detectives Jack Roth and Paco Contreras are partnered up to investigate a series of murders on the Sunset Strip. The detectives enlist the help of journalist Karen McClaren, photographer Diver Hawkes, and Jack's mistress and undercover cop Dianne Kubek in order to identify and capture the Hollywood Slayer and his lover.

== Cast and characters ==
=== Main ===
- Jeremy Sisto as Detective Jack Roth
- Taissa Farmiga as Karen McClaren
- Gabriel Luna as Detective Paco Contreras
- Jaime Ray Newman as Allison Roth
- Evan Ross as Diver Hawkes
- Ed Westwick as Kent Grainger
- Anne Winters as Vicki Roth
- Karolina Wydra as Dianne Kubek
- Erika Christensen as Betty Beaumontaine

=== Recurring ===
- Talia Toms as Jane
- Kirk Baltz as Artie Bukowski
- Sara Mornell as Eileen Miller
- Olivia Moss as Mary
- W. Earl Brown as Captain Dan Wilkinson
- Lew Temple as Dave Keller
- Kascee Murdock as Freddie Beaumontaine
- Lola Wayne Villa as Tiffany Beaumontaine
- Vincent Ventresca as Jimmy Lovett
- Doug Simpson as Ralph Peyton
- Heather Grace Hancock as Mallory Kharchenko
- Tyson Ritter as Bucket

=== Guest stars ===
- Stephen Pearcy as Roscoe
- Joe Walsh as Director
- Haley Strode as Rita Forrester
- Gabriel Bateman as Cooper Flynn
- Eric Pierpoint as Bruce Forrester
- Sam Adegoke as Graham Walker
- Heather Mazur as Penelope Evans

== Episodes ==
No.	Title	Directed by	Written by	Original release date	US viewers (millions)
1	"Pilot"	Tom Shankland	Steven Baigelman	October 27, 2015	3.28
Karen McClaren encounters "John" (an alias of Kent Grainger) at the Whisky a Go Go. She gives him her number after he offers to help her career as a journalist. Afterward, Kent dedicates a song on the radio to a girl, Emily Fuentes, then brutally murders her. Detectives Jack Roth and Paco Contreras are assigned the case and are told that the killer had sex with the victim after she died. The next night, Kent meets Betty Beaumontaine, but refrains from killing her after finding out she is a single mother. The two begin to bond over their mutual abandonment and sociopathic tendencies. Meanwhile, Jack is having an affair with Dianne Kubek, who works undercover as a drug dealer on the Sunset Strip. Kent invites Karen to a Billy Idol concert at the Whisky. At another crime scene, Karen and her boss, Diver Hawkes, attempt to photograph the scene but are caught by the police. Karen tells them that she saw Emily on the night she died, and Jack requests that she help identify the killer. At the concert, Jack meets up with Karen and states that "John" is likely the murderer. Jack is then informed that the radio station has just had a dedication made for Karen, who has subsequently gone missing. Betty shows up at the Whisky, and she and Kent leave with another girl, Mallory, in tow.
2	"Running with the Devil"	Jon Cassar	Mick Betancourt	November 3, 2015	2.42
Jack and Paco search for Karen, while Kent and Betty have a twisted threesome with Mallory. Karen and Diver go to LA Notorious, where Diver tells Karen to use her fight-or-flight response to write a story about the killer. The next morning, Mallory disappears, prompting Kent to disguise himself as a cop in order to find her. The two detectives locate Karen and get her to meet with a sketch artist; the resulting drawing is disseminated around town, including the hospital where Betty works. Betty confronts Kent about his obsession to find Mallory and shows him the sketch. Paco trades details about the case for information from Diver, who puts the cops in touch with Bucket, a Fly Brand cocaine dealer. The police get a lead when they tap a phone call Kent makes to Mallory's apartment. Karen prepares to leave Los Angeles because the killer knows too much about her, but Diver tries to make her stay. They then give in to their mutual attraction and sleep together. Afterward, Karen gets a note through the door from the Hollywood Slayer, asking if she "wants to play". Jack goes to an upholstery warehouse and finds a corpse holding a note, informing him that his lead was a set up. Kent takes Betty to the spot where he murders his victims and stabs Mallory to death as Betty watches.
3	"Should I Stay or Should I Go"	J. Michael Muro	Melissa Blake	November 10, 2015	1.69
Betty flees from Kent, but he tracks her down in the nearby woods. He tells her that, though she may need time to adjust to his ways, he has faith in her. Jack and Paco identify the warehouse corpse as Vera Bennett, and deduce that she was the killer's first victim. When the two detectives visit a library in which Vera worked, they come across Diver and Karen, who are following a riddle left by Kent. Karen informs them that the killer wants her to find a copy of The Phantom of the Opera, and reasons that it could be Kent's way of explaining himself. Meanwhile, Kent checks out a copy of The Phantom previously belonging to Vera from the same library. He says that someone special introduced him to the novel, and gifts it to Betty. Karen locates the shelf where the book should be, but instead finds Mallory's head in a box. Later, a conversation with his daughter prompts Jack to find a wedding ring on Vera's corpse. He revisits the warehouse and finds "C+V" carved into a floor panel. Jack and Paco question Vera's old boyfriend, who tells them of a young orphan named Cooper with whom Vera was acquainted. Karen receives another riddle from Kent, and calls Jack to tell him she may know where Mallory's body has been disposed. Kent takes Betty back to the place they met, and Betty picks out their next victim.
4	"The Very Thought of You"	J. Miller Tobin	Sarah Byrd	November 17, 2015	N/A
The detectives look into the Hollywood Slayer's past, discovering that his aspiring actress mother, Rita Forrester, overdosed when he was eight. Later, they find Mallory's body, and discover Fly Brand cocaine on her person, prompting Jack to reach out to Dianne in order to contact her drug boss Graham Walker. Graham recognizes Paco from their war days, identifying him as a former drug addict, causing Paco to become defensive. Jack is told by one of Graham's prostitutes that their killer had paid her to act dead during their meetings. Kent, dressed up as another one of his aliases, takes Betty to a party, where they pick up a victim under the guise of inviting her to a photoshoot. After drugging the girl, the two stab her to death. The next morning, Kent tells Betty about his mother; Betty promises to never abandon him. Meanwhile, Karen is interviewed on television about her role in the case, and subsequently gets a job offer from her dream employer Rolling Stone, angering Diver. After finding old head shots of Rita, Jack realizes that the killer is dressing up his victims like his mother. He also discovers one of Rita's old audition tapes, featuring a young Kent. Elsewhere, Dianne and Bucket have an audience with Graham, who blames the latter for the cops' knowledge of him. He then shoots Bucket in the head.
5	"Heat Wave"	Jon Amiel	Ashley Gable	November 24, 2015	N/A
Jack and Paco ask LA Notorious to run another story about the killer, with the shot of Kent as a child on the front cover. This leads to one of Kent's schoolmates contacting the police, who names him as Cooper Flynn. After the story is published, Kent visits Karen at her home, waking her in the night. He asks her to be his voice, not the police's. In return, Karen asks for a personal interview with Kent. Elsewhere, Diver is trying to locate Bucket, unaware he is dead and that Dianne has taken his place as manager of the drug ring. He later spots Jack and Dianne kissing, and takes photos of the two. The detectives decipher that the killer must work in the motor industry, due to his access to vintage cars. They also theorize that these cars are where the murders take place. This discovery leads the police to Kent's auto shop, where Jack finds blood in the water pipes. Kent later arrives at the shop, but drives away before any police officers can see his face. Meanwhile, Betty's old flame, Jimmy Lovett, suspects Kent of being a drug dealer. He trades his silence on the matter for sexual favors from Betty, who reluctantly agrees. During their meeting one night, Betty stabs Jimmy to death with a knife gifted to her by Kent. Later, Kent babysits his neighbor's daughter, Mary, who becomes suspicious of Kent after watching a TV report on the killer.
6	"Blizzard of Ozz"	Allison Liddi-Brown	Sonya Winton & Jonathan I. Kidd	December 1, 2015	N/A
Jack and Paco question Kent's co-workers and find out his "real" name, Kent Grainger, but no records are found about him. When going through files from the auto shop, Paco discovers a Xerox of Kent's I.D. Kent visits Betty at the hospital; she takes him to the morgue so they won't be seen, where he proceeds to break up with her, fearing that the police will catch them both if they don't part ways. Kent dyes his hair in an attempt to conceal his identity. His acquaintance, Bobby, creates new I.D.'s for him; he then ties her up and locks her in a closet. Meanwhile, Betty disguises herself as a makeup lady and visits Jack's wife, Allison, at their home. When leaving, she takes a photo of the family and a set of keys to the house. Mary calls the police's hotline to give Kent's address, but her dyslexia mixes up the house number. Elsewhere, during a live interview on Eyewitness News, Karen gets a call from Kent, who says that the story hasn't yet had its climactic ending. Diver identifies a song playing in the background of the call as "Suicide Solution" by Ozzy Osbourne, and suggests Kent might kill himself. When the police realize Mary's mistake, they arrive at her house just as Kent causes an explosion in his home across the street. Betty arrives home, thinking Kent is dead, but he surprises her with the fact that the burned corpse belongs to Jimmy. As the two kiss, the residents of Los Angeles think the Hollywood Slayer's reign of terror has ended.
7	"Destroyer"	Adam Kane	Amy B. Harris	December 8, 2015	N/A
Diver and Karen contemplate running a story about Jack's affair with Dianne, whom they think is a drug dealer, unaware that she is actually an undercover cop. Jack is doubtful that the case is over, thinking the corpse isn't Kent's. When Kent goes to snoop at LA Notorious, he finds the photos of Jack and Dianne kissing. Thinking the Hollywood Slayer search is over, Paco requests to lead his own case. Later, he and Jack are told that the charred body doesn't belong to Kent; Jack then finds the photos of him and Dianne on his car windshield. Karen confronts Dianne about the affair, unaware that the killer is still at large. Meanwhile, Kent and Betty plan an alibi for her for the night Jimmy disappeared; Kent plants Fly Brand cocaine in Jimmy's car, while Betty plants an auto shop bill in his house. Dressed in costume, Kent approaches Dianne at her club and buys Fly Brand off of her. Betty makes a tearful statement to the cops about having an affair with Jimmy in order to protect herself. Elsewhere, Kent breaks into Jack's house and leaves a copy of the photos on his daughter's bed. Jack, angry about the killer having power over him, starts a fight with Paco, but eventually tells him what's going on. When Jack arrives home, he comes clean to Allison, who storms out of the house. Paco informs Karen and Diver that the killer took photos from their office and now Dianne is in danger; he then goes to Dianne's apartment to warn her, and the two leave without noticing Kent hiding. Jack returns to the Whisky on the advice of Dianne, and is approached by Kent in a disguise.
8	"Goodbye Norma Jean"	Jon Cassar	Melissa Blake	December 15, 2015	N/A
Kent approaches Jack, saying he is not the killer. As a concert begins, Kent runs off, with Jack chasing after him. Jack catches him and takes him into custody. Karen tells Diver that Kent called her again, and his request for her to write a piece on Jack and Dianne's affair convinced her to do the opposite. Allison finds out that Vicki lost her virginity, as well as that Vicki knew about her father's affair. Kent is granted a phone call; he calls Betty, setting their plan of getting him free. During the interrogation, Jack makes Kent look at all the compiled evidence. Kent continues to claim that he is being framed. He says that his grandfather is the killer, but Jack isn't convinced. Kent then claims that it was Dave Keller, his co-worker, but no evidence can back the theory up. Karen does a TV segment warning the people of Los Angeles to stay safe. At the club, Dianne is told that Karen has been looking for her, as well as a "blonde chick" which later turns out to be Betty. Paco tells Jack that they found Fly Brand cocaine and a missing girl's ring in Dave's car; Jack says that Kent most likely planted them there. On TV, Karen tells the world that she is the voice of Kent's victims. Betty kills another girl and drops the body at the Santa Monica Pier, prompting Jack to realize that Kent has a partner. His captain gives him an hour to find Karen, in order to identify the Hollywood Slayer, or Kent goes free. The body at the pier ends up being Karen's. Back at the precinct, Jack angrily lashes out at Kent as he leaves custody. Six months later, Dianne returns to work at the police station. Paco and Jack vow that the next time Kent and Betty make a kill, they will catch them. Kent and a visibly pregnant Betty are shown living in Chicago. The series ends with Kent dedicating Foreigner's "Feels Like the First Time" to a new victim.

== Production ==
=== Development ===
[I]n the midst of all the crime that's going on, in the different time periods of the show, it's really a love letter to Los Angeles. People are sophisticated viewers, as evidenced by the risks that are taken in cable television, and I think network has to do the same thing. I won't even speak for network. I'll just speak for us. We, as producers, want to do the same thing.

— Executive producer Todd Lieberman on the initial concept of the series.

It was first reported in September 2014 that the American Broadcasting Company network was developing a true crime series created by Steven Baigelman, and executive produced by Baigelman with Laurie Zaks, Todd Lieberman, and David Hoberman of Mandeville Films. Originally conceived as an anthology series, the project was described as "a character-driven, true crime procedural that explores sex, politics and popular culture across various noteworthy eras in L.A. history." On January 23, 2015, it was announced that ABC had given the project a pilot order. The original pilot, then titled L.A. Crime, was directed by Tom Shankland.

On May 7, 2015, the pilot was officially ordered to series by ABC, and its title was changed to Wicked City. At the network's Upfront, ABC president Paul Lee stated that the show was their highest testing pilot of 2015 among millennials. The series was originally intended to be a midseason entry for the 2015–16 television season, but was moved up to an October premiere when Of Kings and Prophets was pulled from ABC's fall schedule. On June 11, 2015, Amy B. Harris was announced as showrunner and executive producer for the series. On June 18, 2015, the first season was reported to consist of 10 one-hour episodes. On June 29, 2015, Jon Cassar joined Wicked City as a director and executive producer.

=== Casting ===
On February 24, 2015, Erika Christensen was the first to be cast in the role of Betty Beaumontaine. Taissa Farmiga and Darrell Britt-Gibson were cast the following day as Karen McClaren and Diver Hawkes, respectively. On March 3, 2015, Karolina Wydra joined the cast as Dianne Kubek. The next day, it was announced that Adam Rothenberg had been cast in the leading role of Detective Jack Roth, and Holley Fain had been cast as his wife Allison. On March 11, 2015, Anne Winters joined the cast as Vicki Roth. That same day, it was announced that Gabriel Luna had been cast in the role of Detective Paco Contreras. On March 12, 2015, Ed Westwick was cast as Kent Grainger, the Hollywood Slayer. On May 18, 2015, it was announced that the roles of Jack Roth, Diver Hawkes, and Allison Roth were being recast. Rothenberg departed the project due to the renewal of his television series Ripper Street. On July 6, 2015, it was reported that Jeremy Sisto and Evan Ross had landed the roles of Jack Roth and Diver Hawkes, respectively, in the recasting. On August 13, 2015, Jaime Ray Newman was confirmed to star as Allison Roth.

In August 2015, the producers stated that the series plans to have notable musicians appearing in guest roles. Among them were Stephen Pearcy of Ratt, Joe Walsh of the Eagles, and Tyson Ritter of The All-American Rejects. In September 2015, Vincent Ventresca joined the cast to recur as Jimmy Lovett, the ex-boyfriend of Betty. Gabriel Bateman and Haley Strode were cast to portray Kent as a child (then named Cooper Flynn) and his mother, Rita Forrester, in flashbacks.

=== Filming ===
Principal photography for the pilot episode began on March 16, 2015, in Los Angeles, California. Filming took place at the Los Angeles Herald-Examiner building located in Downtown Los Angeles, on Ventura Boulevard in the San Fernando Valley, and at the Whisky a Go Go on the Sunset Strip. Production on the pilot was completed on April 2, 2015. Filming for the remainder of the series was shot on sound stages and on location on the Sunset Strip; visual effects were later added to give the series a realistic '80s look. Principal photography for the season began on August 20, 2015. The series' sound stages are located at the Los Angeles Center Studios. Production on the series ended on November 17, 2015.

On November 13, 2015, ABC cancelled the series, announcing their decision to stop production following the completion of filming for the series' eighth episode.

== Marketing ==
The first promotional trailer, episode stills, and character portraits were revealed on May 12, 2015, at the ABC Upfront. Two promotional posters for the first season were released exclusively by Variety on August 25, 2015. On October 20, 2015, the network released footage of several minutes of the pilot to television news sites.

== Reception ==
=== Reviews ===
Wicked City has received generally negative critical reception from television critics. On review aggregator website Rotten Tomatoes, the series holds an 18% rating, based on 45 reviews, with an average rating of 4.07/10. The site's critical consensus reads, "Wicked City falls prey to the style-over-substance stereotype of the decade in which it takes place – although it does have a killer '80s soundtrack." On Metacritic, the series holds a 33 out of 100 rating, from 30 critical responses, indicating "generally unfavorable reviews".

=== Awards and nominations ===
Year	Association	Category	Recipient(s)	Result	Ref
2016	People's Choice Awards	Favorite New TV Drama	Wicked City	Nominated	

=== Ratings ===
The first episode premiered to a 0.9/3 18–49 rating and 3.28 million viewers, marking a then-record low for a non-Friday premiere on ABC. The second episode saw the ratings drop to a 0.7/2 18–49 rating and 2.42 million viewers. By the third episode, ratings dropped even lower to a 0.4/1 18–49 rating and 1.69 million viewers, prompting ABC to pull the series off its schedule.

Live +7 Ratings
No.	Title	Air date	Rating/share (18–49)	Viewers (millions)	DVR viewers (millions)	Total viewers (millions)
1	"Pilot"	October 27, 2015	0.9/3	3.28	1.65	4.93
2	"Running with the Devil"	November 3, 2015	0.7/2	2.42	1.27	3.70
3	"Should I Stay or Should I Go"	November 10, 2015	0.4/1	1.69	1.06	2.75

== Broadcast ==
The series began airing on TVN 7 in Poland and Fox Crime in Asia on October 29, 2015. All five unaired episodes were made available weekly to New Zealand viewers on TVNZ OnDemand, from November 18 through December 30, 2015. The remaining episodes, excluding the series finale, were released on Hulu in the United States on December 22, 2015, with the finale airing on December 30. It airs on Fox with Finnish Subtitles.
