= Christopher Wilkinson =

American screenwriter, producer, and director (born 1950)

- Born: March 29, 1950 (age 76); New York City, U.S.
- Education: Temple University
- Occupations: Screenwriter, producer and director
- Years active: 1977–present
- Spouse: Cathy Guisewite (m. 1997, div. 2011)
- Children: 2

Christopher Wilkinson is an American screenwriter, producer, and director. He is best known for writing the Academy Award-nominated screenplay for Oliver Stone's film Nixon, and for Ali, starring Will Smith.

== Early life and education ==
Wilkinson was born in New York City and raised in Philadelphia. He began his career as a musician while attending film school at Temple University.

== Career ==
Before working on feature films, Wilkinson wrote, produced, and directed documentaries, industrials, and commercials for EUE/Screen Gems, PBS, Center City Video, and Bell of Pennsylvania. During this period, he also worked as a cameraman for ESPN. After director Mark Rydell saw Wilkinson's documentary Engine 2, Ladder 3 during a directing seminar at the Maine Photographic Workshop, he hired Wilkinson as second unit director for his film The River (1984). Wilkinson would go on to run script development at Rydell's Concourse Productions, and direct the second units of his films For the Boys (1991) and Intersection (1994).

Wilkinson has written several films with Stephen J. Rivele. In 1992, they were hired to write three screenplays for George Harrison's HandMade Films, which cemented their partnership. They went on to write Nixon (1995), starring Anthony Hopkins, and Ali (2001), directed by Michael Mann. They wrote and produced Copying Beethoven (2006), starring Ed Harris, and Birth of the Dragon (2016). They were also writers and executive producers on Ed Zwick's Pawn Sacrifice (2014) and Miles Ahead (2015), directed by and starring Don Cheadle.

On his own, Wilkinson wrote the pilot for the television series Fordlandia, to be directed by Werner Herzog, and the screenplay for the upcoming Ridley Scott film, The Dog Stars.

== Personal life ==
Wilkinson lives in Los Angeles, California. He was formerly married to cartoonist Cathy Guisewite (creator of the comic strip Cathy).

== Filmography ==
Film

Year	Title	Writer	Producer
1995	Nixon	Yes	No
2001	Ali	Yes	No
2006	Copying Beethoven	Yes	Yes
2014	Pawn Sacrifice	Story	Executive
2015	Miles Ahead	Story	Executive
2016	Birth of the Dragon	Yes	Yes
2026	The Dog Stars	Yes	No

Documentary film

Year	Title	Director	Writer	Producer
1981	Engine 2, Ladder 3	Yes	Yes	Yes
2014	Virtuosity	Yes	Yes	Yes

Uncredited rewrites

- The River (1984)
- Nuts (1987)
- Moneyball (2011)
- All Eyez on Me (2017)
- Bohemian Rhapsody (2018)
- A Star Is Born (2018)
- Gemini Man (2019)

Other credits

Year	Title	2nd Unit Director	Producer	Notes
1984	The River	Yes	No	
1991	For the Boys	Yes	Associate	Played the part of Niles LaGuardia
1994	Intersection	Yes	Post-Production Supervisor	
