= Golgotha Falls =

1984 novel by Frank De Felitta

Golgotha Falls: An Assault on the Fourth Dimension
- Author: Frank De Felitta
- Audio read by: Edison McDaniels
- Language: English
- Genre: Horror
- Published: 1984
- Publisher: Simon and Schuster
- Publication place: United States
- Media type: Print (hardback, paperback), ebook, audiobook
- Pages: 319 pages
- ISBN: 0671507753 First edition hardback
- Preceded by: For Love of Audrey Rose
- Followed by: Funeral March

Golgotha Falls: An Assault on the Fourth Dimension is a 1984 horror novel that was written by Frank De Felitta. First published by Simon and Schuster, Golgotha Falls has gone through several reprints.

== Synopsis ==
Two paranormal researchers from Harvard University, Mario and Anita, have traveled to Golgotha Falls, Massachusetts to investigate an abandoned cathedral that is purportedly the site of strong supernatural events. They are surprised to discover that a Jesuit priest, Malcolm, is there to exorcise and reconsecrate the church by holding a mass. Despite being ordered to keep the exorcism secret, Malcolm agrees to let them record the proceedings as he recognizes that Mario will leave the church voluntarily. The exorcism is very difficult and Malcolm experiences strong temptations and terrifying visions, but manages to succeed through what he interprets as divine intervention. Mario and Anita are stunned when they manage to record what appears to be a vision of the Crucifixion. Malcolm travels back to the bishop at the Boston archdiocese, where his claims are dismissed as misinterpretations and fantasy. Returning to the cathedral, Malcolm is horrified to discover that Mario has moved parts of the altar around to set up more cameras and cords, as this would run the risk of undoing the exorcism. He grows more afraid when Mario states his intent to hold a conference back at Harvard. The two men argue and Mario returns to Boston; Anita remains behind with Malcolm.

The conference draws a large crowd, however when he attempts to bring the evidence up on a big screen the audience instead sees pornography and a horse trampling a man to death. While the physical materials does show the supernatural evidence, attempts by Mario to bring this to the audience's attention results in him speaking in tongues and eventually passing out. When he comes to his senses Mario believes that Malcolm sabotaged him via a psychic projection, as Mario doesn't believe in Christianity, and travels back to Golgotha Falls to record more evidence and confront the priest. Meanwhile Malcolm has been trying to undo Mario's actions, but the church has been retaken by evil. Mario returns and tries to force more visions out of the priest, but only results in the priest becoming possessed.

Ultimately the evil is exorcised by the Pope, who was visiting the United States while on his way to Canada, which is witnessed by reporters, townspeople, and others who have followed the Pope. Malcolm returns to the priesthood while Mario retires from teaching, instead taking on a blue collar job. He still refuses to believe that the events were proof of Christianity and writes a book detailing what happened, which he titles Golgotha Falls: An Assault on the Fourth Dimension. Anita has returned to Harvard and continued teaching, but is now a believer of Christianity.

== Publication history ==
Golgotha Falls was first published in the United States during 1984 through Simon and Schuster, which published it in hardback. Pocket Books published an American mass market paperback version the following year and in 1986 the British publisher Hodder & Stoughton released a paperback edition. In 2014 Valancourt Books issued paperback and e-book editions of Golgotha Falls. Approximately six years later in 2020, an audiobook narration by Edison McDaniels was also released by Valancourt Books.

== Reception ==
Golgotha Falls received reviews from publications such as the Los Angeles Times, Chicago Tribune, and People, the latter of which criticized it as a "chaotic mess" and that the characters were "cartoon figures". A reviewer for the New York Times was also critical, stating that "''Golgotha Falls'' is less an ''Assault on the Fourth Dimension,'' as its subtitle promises, than an assault on intelligence and syntax."

Wendy Graham reviewed Golgotha Falls for Adventurer magazine and stated that "Sure it is a bit tedious at times, but generally it is a powerful tale, whether you believe in the Prince of Darkness or not."
