= Frank De Felitta =

American novelist (1921–2016)

Frank Paul De Felitta
- Born: August 3, 1921; New York City, U.S.
- Died: April 1, 2016 (aged 94); Los Angeles, California, U.S.
- Occupations: Writer; film director; pilot
- Spouse: Dorothy Gilbert
- Children: 2, including Raymond
- Writing career
- Notable works: Audrey Rose, The Entity

Frank Paul De Felitta (August 3, 1921 – March 29, 2016) was an author, producer, pilot and film director. He was best known for his novels Audrey Rose and The Entity.

== Life and career ==
Frank De Felitta was born in The Bronx, New York City, New York on August 3, 1921. He served as a pilot in World War II and in 1945 returned to New York, where he began to write scripts. His first effort, for the weekly radio program The Whistler, a popular thriller series, earned him $350 and started him on his writing career. He continued to write radio scripts before turning to television, where he was successful as a writer, producer, and director, winning Emmy nominations in 1963 and 1968 for his documentaries as well as a Peabody Award and several Writers Guild nominations.

By the early 1970s he was working on film scripts, including two he wrote with Max Ehrlich, The Edict (1971) and The Savage is Loose (1974). The Edict was filmed as Z.P.G. (1972), and both it and The Savage is Loose were published as novels by Max Ehrlich.

De Felitta's first novel, Oktoberfest (1973), a thriller, though not a bestseller nonetheless earned him enough to finance the year and a half he devoted to his next novel, Audrey Rose (1975). This novel, a horror story involving reincarnation, was a smash bestseller, selling more than 2.5 million copies and spawning a successful 1977 film adaptation (scripted by De Felitta) and a sequel, For Love of Audrey Rose (1982). His novel The Entity (1978), based on the real-life case of a woman named Doris Bither who claimed to have been haunted by a spectral rapist, was also a bestseller and was adapted by De Felitta for a 1982 film starring Barbara Hershey. Other successes include Golgotha Falls (1984) and the horror film Dark Night of the Scarecrow (1981), directed by De Felitta. He also directed the 1991 film Scissors, starring Sharon Stone and distributed by Paramount Pictures.

Frank De Felitta died on March 30, 2016, of natural causes.

== Bibliography ==
- Oktoberfest (1973)
- Audrey Rose (1975)
- The Entity (1978)
- Sea Trial (1980)
- For Love of Audrey Rose (1982)
- Golgotha Falls (1984)
- Funeral March (1990)
- L'Opera Italiano
