= Doris Bither case =

Alleged case of paranormal activity

Photograph by paranormal investigators Barry Taff and Kerry Gaynor, showing a beam of light surrounding Doris Bither

The Doris Bither case, also known as the Entity haunting, was a 1974 investigation into alleged paranormal phenomena in Culver City, California, experienced by a woman named Doris Bither, who claimed to have been tormented and sexually assaulted by a supernatural entity in her home. Bither's alleged experiences were investigated by a team of researchers led by Barry Taff from the now-defunct parapsychology department from the University of California, Los Angeles. During the course of their ten-week investigation, numerous investigators claimed to have observed various supernatural occurrences in the home, including poltergeist activity and the manifestation of strange light figures which appeared throughout the house.

The case inspired Frank De Felitta's 1978 book The Entity, which was made into a 1982 film of the same name starring Barbara Hershey.

== Background ==
Doris Bither approached parapsychologist Barry Taff in August 1974 after encountering him in a Los Angeles bookstore, relating a series of alarming phenomena she was experiencing in her Culver City home. At the time, Taff was working in the now-defunct parapsychology lab run by Thelma Moss at the University of California, Los Angeles.

With the assistance of his peer Kerry Gaynor, Taff conducted a preliminary interview of Bither's paranormal claims, including a 16-page questionnaire, though Bither remained somewhat evasive, refusing to even share her age. Taff commented that "It was clear Doris was deeply unhappy." This interview revealed Bither had a history of physical abuse and significant drug use along with a traumatic childhood. The investigators also found that Bither and her four children were living illegally in a condemned home that was in severe disrepair. Bither alleged that she was attacked and raped by one or several invisible entities. More benign manifestations recounted by Bither included luminous, transparent human shapes and poltergeist events.

== Investigation ==
Taff and Gaynor visited the Culver City house for the first time on August 22, 1974, with repeated visits over a ten-week period. The investigators, which included approximately 25 individuals from the UCLA parapsychology department, did not look into the spectral rape allegation, as the alleged violence preceded their involvement in the case and Taff himself believes such incidents did not occur.

Upon their second visit to the home, Taff and others claimed to have witness a frying pan mysteriously fly across the kitchen. "We arrived with scientific instruments, cameras and such, trying to collect evidence this was real, but it was elusive," Taff later said. "Things rarely happen when you are waiting for them. After 50 years, I can say one thing—this was the real deal. It shook me, then and now, and I still think about it a lot."

During the course of their visits, investigators noted what Taff called poltergeist activity: objects falling from shelves by themselves, strange lights, foul odors, and cold zones in the house. On numerous occasions, various investigators, including Taff, claimed to have observed lights flying around Bither's bedroom, which were "corpuscular in shape" and "expanding, contracting [in] appearance, sometimes encompassing the entire room." One night, photographer Dick Thompson brought a Canon 35 mm camera and began photographing Bither in her bedroom as she verbally taunted the entity, asking to present itself. Those present claimed to have witnessed a small ball of light bounce along the bedroom wall.

The researchers indicated that those occurrences decreased over the course of the visits. They were joined in their visits by an acquaintance of Bither's who said she could communicate with spirits, as well as a large number of people related to the laboratory, or to Taff and Gaynor in one way or another, but Taff and Gaynor (in addition to Bither herself) are the only ones who offered a description of unusual occurrences.

== Evidence and theories ==
=== Photographs ===
Photographs of what appears to be lights are the only objective evidence gathered in the course of the visits. The images were taken by both Taff and Gaynor with an instant film Polaroid SX-70 camera and a Canon 35 mm camera. The investigators indicated they encountered moving balls of light, but what the images show takes a different appearance: a static, circular band of light; an irregular bright line; and shapeless overexposed areas. Taff and Gaynor brought an infrared camera, but accidentally overexposed the film, rendering it unusable.

An analysis of the photographs attributed the result to common photography mistakes, such as a thin object close to the camera, or accidental manipulation of the exposure dial. In the case of the 35 mm pictures, mishaps in the development process may yield results similar to what is shown. Even if those mistakes are discounted, none of the lighter areas on the photographs are consistent with the trail a moving light would leave on photographic material.

=== Skepticism and explanations ===
Reviewing the case four decades later, investigator and skeptic Benjamin Radford concluded the events experienced by Bither revolved around a distressed family, poor investigation techniques, and confirmation bias.

Based on Bither's story, his own observations, and the photographs, Taff concluded paranormal phenomena must have been involved, calling the case a haunting. Taff later stated that the majority of the 4,800 paranormal cases he investigated over the course of his career were caused by "unusual but conventional" phenomena, but that Bither's experiences were uniquely mysterious. Taff theorized that Bither may have acted as an "energy generator" or poltergeist who was unconsciously manifesting the supernatural occurrences. Despite such theories, the case concluded without a formal resolution.

== Aftermath ==
Frank De Felitta wrote a book about the case, The Entity, published in 1978. The book was made into a 1982 film of the same name by Sidney J. Furie, and starring Barbara Hershey in the lead role. Taff served as a technical advisor on the film.

Bither died in 1999.

A second film based on Bither's story, entitled What Happened to Doris?, will be released in 2026. It stars Heather Graham and Mimi Rogers.

== See also ==
- List of haunted locations

== Sources ==
- Conrad, Barry (2009). An Unknown Encounter: A True Account of the San Pedro Haunting. Pittsburgh, Pennsylvania: Dorrance Publishing. ISBN 978-1-4349-9188-1.
- Marks, Laura Helen (2016). "Bither, Doris". In Pulliam, June; Fonseca, Anthony (eds.). Ghosts in Popular Culture and Legend. Santa Barbara, California: ABC-CLIO. pp. 28–29. ISBN 978-1-440-83490-5.
- Meehan, Paul (2009). Cinema of the Psychic Realm: A Critical Survey. Jefferson, North Carolina: McFarland & Company. ISBN 978-0-7864-5474-7.
- Meehan, Paul (2019). The Haunted House on Film: An Historical Analysis. Jefferson, North Carolina: McFarland & Company. ISBN 978-1-476-67458-2.
