= Jacqueline Brookes =

American actress, acting teacher

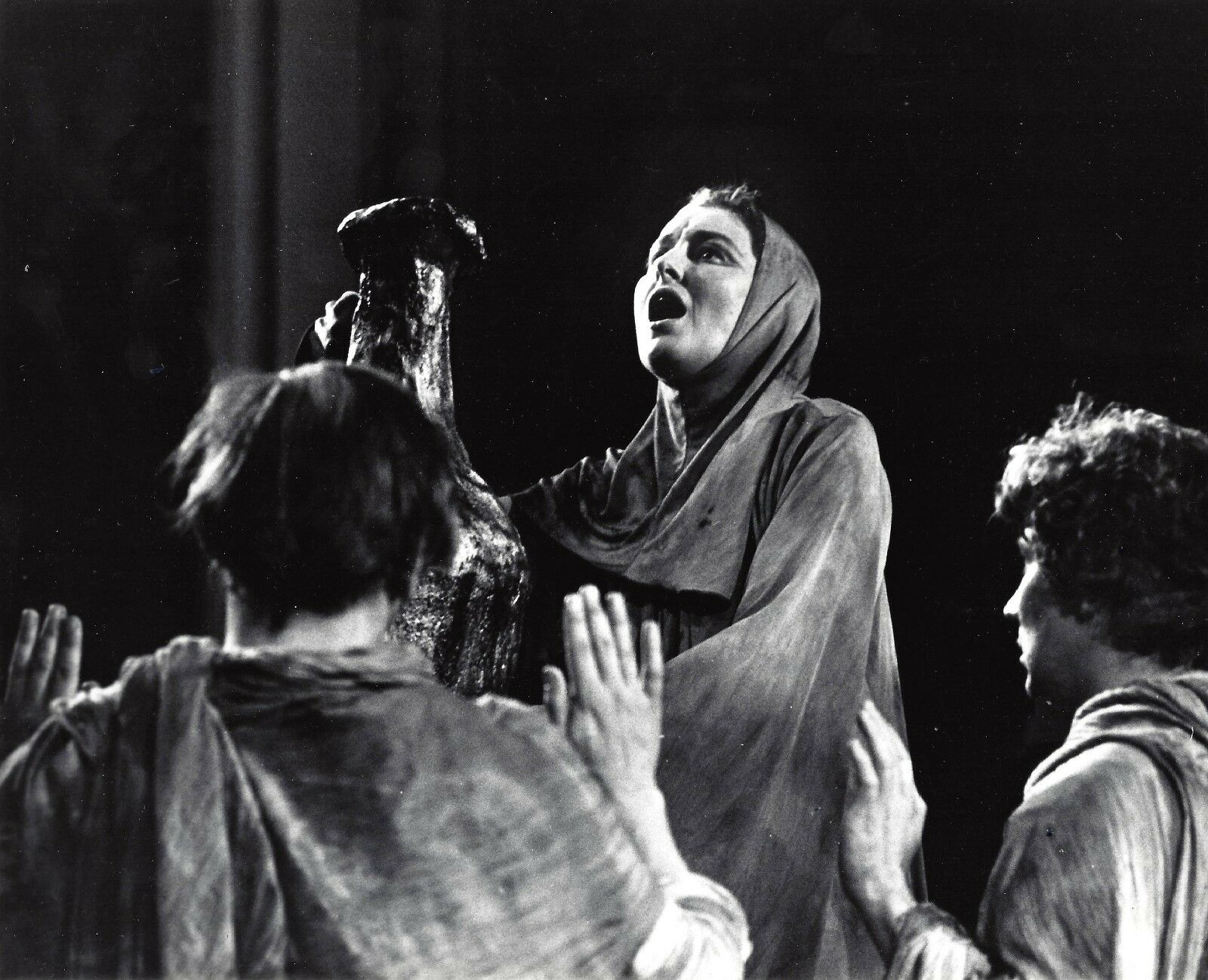
- Brookes in The Persians, 1970
- Born: Jacqueline Victoire Brookes; July 24, 1930; Montclair, New Jersey, U.S.
- Died: April 26, 2013 (aged 82); New York City, U.S.
- Occupations: Actress; acting teacher
- Years active: 1952–1996

Jacqueline Victoire Brookes (July 24, 1930 – April 26, 2013) was an American film, television, and stage actress, best known for her work both off-Broadway and on Broadway.

== Life and career ==
Brookes was born in Montclair, New Jersey, the daughter of Maria Victoire (née Zur Haar) and Frederick Jack Brookes, an investment banker. She attended a French-speaking school in New York and spoke fluent French. She attended the University of Iowa, graduating with a Bachelor of Fine Arts. Then she went to London on a Fulbright Scholarship to study at the Royal Academy of Dramatic Art in London.

During the 1960s, she spent several summers acting in the Shakespeare Festival at the Old Globe Theater in San Diego, performing in plays such as Antony and Cleopatra, A Winter's Tale, The Merchant of Venice, A Midsummer Night's Dream, The Merry Wives of Windsor, and Richard III. During that era, she also performed Rosalind in As You Like It at the New Mexico State University, Katherine in The Taming of the Shrew at the University of British Columbia, and Beatrice in Much Ado About Nothing at the Shakespeare Festival in Stratford, Connecticut.

Aside from her work in Shakespearian plays, she also performed on Broadway in The Cherry Orchard, A Moon for the Misbegotten, The Duchess of Malfi, and originated the role of Norma Henshaw in Jim Leonard's The Diviners in 1980.

Jacqueline Brookes in later years was a teacher at the Circle in the Square Theatre School as well as a life member of The Actors Studio.

Brookes appeared in the films Ghost Story, The Entity, Paternity, The Good Son, and Losing Isaiah.

She died at age 82 from lymphoma.

== Awards ==
She received her Theatre World Award in 1955 for The Cretan Woman and won an Obie Award for Best Actress in 1963 for Six Characters in Search of an Author.

== Filmography ==
=== Film ===
Jacqueline Brookes film credits
Year	Title	Role	Notes
1971	The Hospital	Dr. Immelman (uncredited)	
1972	Parades	Mrs. Novik (uncredited)	
1973	The Werewolf of Washington	Angela - Publisher	
1974	The Gambler	Naomi Freed	
1977	Looking Up	Becky	
1979	Last Embrace	Dr. Coopersmith	
1981	Paternity	Aunt Ethel	
1981	Ghost Story	Milly	
1982	Love and Money	Mrs. Paultz	
1982	The Entity	Dr. Cooley	
1983	Without a Trace	Margaret Mayo	
1989	Sea of Love	Helen's Mother	
1991	The Naked Gun 2½: The Smell of Fear	Commissioner Brumford	
1992	Whispers in the Dark	Lorraine McDowell	
1993	The Good Son	Alice Davenport	
1995	Losing Isaiah	Judge Silbowitz	(final film role)

=== Television ===
Jacqueline Brookes television credits
Year	Title	Role	Notes
1964–1965	A Flame in the Wind	Flora Perkins	3 episodes
1969–1973	As the World Turns	Miss Thompson	
1972	The Secret Storm	Ursula Winthrop	1 episode
1975–1976	Another World	Beatrice Gordon	12 episodes
1978	A Death in Canaan	Mildred Carston	TV movie
1982	Ryan's Hope	Sister Mary Joel	4 episodes
1984	License to Kill	Judge Miriam Roth	TV movie
1985	Silent Witness	Ma Dunne	TV movie
1986	Jack and Mike	Nora Adler	3 episodes
1986	The Equalizer	Phyllis Robertson	Episode: "Christmas Presence"
1987	American Playhouse	Mrs. Connaloe	1 episode
1989	The Equalizer	Dr. Grayson	Episode: "Lullaby of Darkness"
1990	Law & Order	Judge Grace Larkin	Episode: "Kiss the Girls and Make Them Die"
1991	All My Children	Judge Irene Singer	10 episodes
1992	Star Trek: The Next Generation	Admiral Andrea Brand	Episode: "The First Duty"
