= Steven Baigelman =

Canadian screenwriter, producer and film director

- Born: Steven J. Baigelman; Toronto, Ontario, Canada
- Education: City College of New York
- Occupations: Screenwriter; producer; director
- Years active: 1996–present
- Spouses: Gayle Fraser (divorced); Heather Fitzgerald (m. 2001–2006)
- Children: 1

Steven J. Baigelman is a Canadian screenwriter, producer, and film director. He has written the screenplays for the crime dramedy Feeling Minnesota (1996), the television crime thriller Brother's Keeper (2002), the biographical drama Get On Up (2014), and the biographical drama Miles Ahead (2015). Baigelman also created the ABC anthology television series Wicked City (2015), on which he also serves as an executive producer.

== Early life ==
Baigelman was born in Toronto, Ontario. He attended York University, before dropping out and moving to New York City. Baigelman then studied acting with Sanford Meisner at the Neighborhood Playhouse School of the Theatre. He later studied painting at City College of New York, exhibiting his work in galleries in New York and Europe. While painting, he worked days as a film production assistant and began writing screenplays.

== Career ==
Baigelman started his career with the crime comedy film Feeling Minnesota, starring Keanu Reeves, Cameron Diaz and Vincent D'Onofrio. He wrote the screenplay and directed the film, which was released on September 13, 1996. He next co-wrote the television film Brother's Keeper with Glenn Gers. The film was directed by John Badham and released on the USA Network on January 29, 2002.

He wrote the initial screenplay for the film Get On Up for Imagine Entertainment. Jez and John-Henry Butterworth contributed to rewrites. The project was stalled for years, until director Tate Taylor revived the script in 2012. The film was released on August 1, 2014 in the United States, with Baigelman getting co-writing credits.

Baigelman, along with Don Cheadle, co-wrote the screenplay for the biographical film Miles Ahead, depicting the life of musician Miles Davis. He also served as executive producer for the project. He next developed the upcoming ABC crime drama anthology television series Wicked City; Baigelman wrote the script for the pilot episode, which was then greenlit by ABC. The project was ordered to series in May 2015, and will debut on October 27, 2015. He will also serve as executive producer alongside David Hoberman, Todd Lieberman and Laurie Zaks.

== Personal life ==
Baigelman was previously married to film producer Gayle Fraser-Baigelman, with whom he has one daughter. He married his second wife, Heather Baigelman (née Fitzgerald), on November 10, 2001 in Clark, Nevada. They divorced in 2006.

== Filmography ==
=== Film ===
- Feeling Minnesota (1996) (writer/director)
- Brother's Keeper (2002) (co-writer)
- Get On Up (2014) (co-story)
- Miles Ahead (2015) (story/co-writer/executive producer)

=== Television ===
- Wicked City (2015; also executive producer)
