= Brother's Keeper (2002 film) =

2002 American television film by John Badham

- Television release poster
- Genre: Crime; Drama
- Written by: Steven Baigelman; Glenn Gers
- Directed by: John Badham
- Starring: Jeanne Tripplehorn; Corin Nemec; Leland Orser; Evan Parke
- Music by: John Ottman
- Country of origin: United States
- Original language: English

Production
- Executive producers: Guy McElwaine; Mark Stern; Pen Densham; John Watson
- Producer: Justis Greene
- Cinematography: Ron Stannett
- Editor: Frank Morriss
- Running time: 86 minutes
- Production companies: Trilogy Entertainment Group; New Line Television

Original release
- Network: USA Network
- Release: January 29, 2002

Brother's Keeper is a 2002 American crime drama television film directed by John Badham and written by Steven Baigelman and Glenn Gers. The film stars Jeanne Tripplehorn as a former police investigator drawn to a series of serial killings in Portland, Oregon that may have been committed by her disturbed younger brother, played by Corin Nemec. Leland Orser and Evan Parke co-star.

Brother's Keeper was produced by Trilogy Entertainment Group and New Line Television and filmed in Vancouver, British Columbia, Canada. It aired in the United States on the USA Network on January 29, 2002.

== Plot ==
Highly intelligent, mentally disturbed career criminal Ellis Pond escapes from prison, runs through a forest, and successfully evades his pursuers.

Ellis's older sister Lucinda, once the best homicide detective in the Portland Police Bureau, now runs a tackle shop from her houseboat. A burnt-out, depressed alcoholic, she is estranged from her husband Adam and young daughter Marcie, and tormented by nightmares of the event that got her removed from the force four years earlier: Her manhunt in Maris Creek for child molester and suspected serial killer Victor Orbin led to a SWAT team gunning down an innocent man working at the site. Orbin, who was never at the scene, is presumed still at large.

Ellis reappears in Portland, strangling and castrating Internal Affairs investigator Fred Tierney, who was responsible for Lucinda's removal. Detective Travis Adler recognizes Orbin's modus operandi and thinks the killer has resurfaced. He asks Lucinda to return to the force to head the case and track down Orbin for good, but she refuses, rattled when learning of Ellis's escape.

Ellis kills an insurance salesman, puts on his clothes, drives to a house and murders the man who answers the door. Both men are strangled and castrated to copycat Orbin. Lucinda discovers that the house was her childhood home. She and Ellis were abused by their alcoholic father, long dead of an illness, and she always tried to take the brunt of it, swearing to always look after Ellis. FBI Special Agent Arthur Fortis, Junior, brought on the case as an advisor, answers a phone call to Lucinda from Ellis, who reveals details of the murders and demands his sister be put on the case.

Lucinda finds a coded note from Ellis in the house's attic, revealing his apparent willingness to surrender to her that night. She figures out the location and stakes it out with Travis, Junior and their team. Ellis calls her, seemingly taunting her with riddles from their childhood, and his location is traced to a homeless shelter across the street. Everyone races there, but Lucinda realizes it is a setup. A booby trap in the room explodes, injuring Junior and killing several other officers.

Ellis escapes and poses as a camper in Crater Lake National Park, where he meets a boy named Kelly. Seeing that Kelly is being abused by his father, Ellis kidnaps him after murdering his father and tying up his mother.

A clue at the house murder leads Lucinda to her father's old office. In the basement, she finds a skeleton in a refrigerator. As the team converges on the park, they learn that the skeleton is Victor Orbin's, and he was dead before the events at Maris Creek, having in fact been previously buried there. Lucinda realizes that Ellis committed all the murders, killed Orbin and framed him, believing that Lucinda would find the body, figure out Ellis was responsible, and come after him. The innocent worker's death was an unforeseen circumstance. With Lucinda pulled from duty and unable to protect Ellis, he was imprisoned on unrelated charges, which explains why "Orbin" stopped killing. Lucinda now knows that Ellis wants her to kill him, to spare her of always having to be her brother's keeper. She is determined to bring him in alive.

As Lucinda and Junior search the forest, she is injured by one of Ellis's traps. Junior performs first aid and heads back to their SUV, where Ellis ambushes and stabs him. Lucinda finds Junior wounded but alive. She presses a GPS beacon on his wrist, alerting the team to their location, then finds Ellis holding Kelly at gunpoint. Ellis begs her to kill him, but she refuses, wounding him and letting Kelly run away. A police sniper fires at Ellis; Lucinda dives in front of the bullet, but it goes through her shoulder and into his chest. As Ellis dies in her arms, he says that he has been killing "just one person" – their father – and that "he kept coming back".

Later, Travis drops Lucinda off at Adam's house, where she reconciles with him and Marcie.

== Cast ==
- Jeanne Tripplehorn as Lucinda Pond
- Corin Nemec as Ellis Pond
- Leland Orser as Travis Adler
- Evan Parke as Junior
- Brian Jensen as David Pond
- Ben Cardinal as Running Bear
- Britt McKillip as Young Lucinda / Marcie
- Cameron Bright as Young Ellis
- Andrew Jackson as Adam
- William S. Taylor as Tierney
- Noel Callahan as Kelly

== Production ==
The film began shooting in Vancouver on May 21, 2001, under the tentative title Breeders.
