= For Love of Audrey Rose =

1982 novel by Frank De Felitta

- Hardcover edition
- Author: Frank De Felitta
- Language: English
- Publication date: 1982

For Love of Audrey Rose is a 1982 horror novel and the sequel to the novel Audrey Rose and its film version. Both books were written by Frank De Felitta.

== Background ==
As with Audrey Rose, De Felitta claimed For Love of Audrey Rose was inspired by his son's sudden piano playing talent and the subsequent visit from an occultist.

== Plot summary ==
In 1964, a fiery car crash claimed the lives of Audrey Rose Hoover and her mother. Eleven years later, Elliot Hoover, her father, believes he has found Audrey's reincarnated soul in the body of 10-year-old Ivy Templeton. When Ivy dies during a terrible hypnotic reenactment of Audrey's death throes, the Templetons are devastated and Elliot disappears. However, the question remains: If Audrey Rose returned as Ivy Templeton, who died in 1975—then, where is she now? Janice Templeton is determined to find the answer.
