= Last Embrace =

1979 film by Jonathan Demme

- Theatrical release poster
- Directed by: Jonathan Demme
- Screenplay by: David Shaber
- Based on: The 13th Man (1977 novel) by Murray Teigh Bloom
- Produced by: Michael Taylor; Dan Wigutow
- Starring: Roy Scheider; Janet Margolin; John Glover; Sam Levene; Charles Napier; Christopher Walken
- Cinematography: Tak Fujimoto
- Edited by: Barry Malkin
- Music by: Miklós Rózsa
- Production company: Taylor-Wigutow Productions
- Distributed by: United Artists
- Release date: May 4, 1979
- Running time: 102 minutes
- Country: United States
- Language: English
- Budget: $4 million
- Box office: $1,537,125

Last Embrace is a 1979 American neo-noir romantic thriller film directed by Jonathan Demme, and starring Roy Scheider, Janet Margolin, John Glover, Sam Levene, Charles Napier and Christopher Walken. Loosely based on the novel The 13th Man by Murray Teigh Bloom, it tells the story of a woman who takes the role similar to the biblical avenger Goel and kills the descendants of the Zwi Migdal, who enslaved her grandmother.

The film was released by United Artists on May 4, 1979, and received mixed reviews.

== Plot ==
U.S. government agent Harry Hannan suffers a nervous breakdown after his wife Dorothy is killed, and spends five months in a sanitarium. Upon returning to his apartment in New York City, he finds it is occupied by a doctoral student named Ellie Fabian. She explains that she had a sublet arranged while she was in the last semester of her studies at Princeton University. Ellie claims that the housing office said the Hannans would be gone indefinitely. She gives Harry a note that was slipped under the door, but it contains only a few Hebrew characters that he cannot read.

Paranoid that he is being targeted by his own agency, Harry visits his supervisor Eckart, who assures Harry that the agency has higher priorities. Eckart insists that Harry is not ready to return to the field, but that he is perfectly safe.

Harry takes the Hebrew note to a local rabbi who can only partially decode it, and explains that it means "Avenger of Blood.". The rabbi then calls Sam Urdell, and informs him that Harry has visited him. Harry notices that he is being surveilled, loses the tail and goes to the American Museum of Natural History, where Ellie is working.

He gives her some money and urges her to stay in a hotel, because he fears she will be accidentally targeted. He then visits his wife's grave, where he confronts her brother, Dave Quittle. Afterwards, Quittle visits Eckhart, who orders Harry's murder.

Ellie stays in the apartment despite Harry's request. Ellie suggests that they take the note to her friend at Princeton who specializes in Hebrew studies. When Harry wakes from a nightmare, he tells Ellie about the death of Dorothy. He takes a prescription pill, but spits it out, realizing that it is cyanide. The next morning, they leave for Princeton. On the train, Ellie tells Harry about her grandmother, when Harry notices Quittle, and an old man, watching them.

At Princeton, Richard Peabody decodes the note for Harry. Peabody has accumulated several notes, all attached to very peculiar murders. Harry is the first one to have received the note and lived. He also relays a message that someone wants to meet Harry in the bell tower courtyard the following day.

In the courtyard, Harry is lured into a trap by Quittle. Harry manages to kill Quittle during a shootout in the bell tower, and then encounters Sam Urdell, the old man on the train. Sam explains that he is part of a committee investigating the blood murders. They investigate the various clues, and they piece together that Harry's grandfather owned a brothel on the Lower East Side of Manhattan.

In a hotel at Niagara Falls, Ellie is dressed as a prostitute and lures Bernie Meckler into a bathtub with her. As she has sex with Meckler, she drowns him. As Harry and Sam put together their information, they are led back to Princeton. Harry realizes that Ellie is the one murdering men, all of whom are descendants of members of Zwi Migdal who had sex trafficked her grandmother.

They drive up to Niagara Falls, where they have an emotional confrontation. She tries to kill him, but confesses that she loves him. He is conflicted, but he tells her that he will turn her in. Ellie runs from him, and he chases her through the Robert Moses Niagara Power Plant. She escapes onto a tour bus and he steals another tour bus and follows her to the Cave of the Winds, where he chases her through the tunnels until they have a final confrontation at the edge of the falls. They break through the railing and Harry grabs Ellie, but she struggles and takes a deadly plummet.

== Cast ==
- Roy Scheider as Harry Hannan
- Janet Margolin as Ellie Fabian
- John Glover as Richard Peabody
- Sam Levene as Sam Urdell
- Charles Napier as Dave Quittle
- Christopher Walken as Eckart
- Jacqueline Brookes as Dr. Coopersmith
- Andrew Duncan as Bernie Meckler
- David Margulies as Rabbi Drexel
- Marcia Rodd as Adrian
- Gary Goetzman as Tour Guide
- Lou Gilbert as Rabbi Jacobs
- Mandy Patinkin and Max Wright as Commuters
- Sandy McLeod as Dorothy Hannan
- Joe Spinell as Man in Cantina

== Production ==
=== Development and writing ===
Jonathan Demme recalled "There were some people who had liked Citizens Band, some producer who knew it, so they sent Last Embrace to me and I loved the idea of doing a film that had the potential of being an Alfred Hitchcock-style thriller. By that I mean that kind of Hitchcockian sense of suspense and complexity of character, as well as narrative."

Demme was also attracted by the chance "to reveal something extraordinary about history" - namely organised corruption such as prostitution run by people within the Jewish church. Demme felt it that if Roy Scheider played the lead "it would be great. I had liked him a lot in some of his previous movies and thought that he could be the Bogart of the 1980s."

Demme said "It was a flawed script, and we tried very hard to fix it. More than anything the experience helped me realize: don't go into a movie unless you believe in the script, because if you don't believe it, how can anyone else believe it?"

=== Filming ===
Principal photography took place on-location in New York City and at Niagara Falls. Because shooting coincided with the height of the tourist season, the production was limited to filming between 3:00am to 8:30am in the tunnels around the Falls. Additional interiors were filmed at the Metro-Goldwyn-Mayer studios in Hollywood.

== Reception ==
The film received mixed reviews from critics. Vincent Canby in The New York Times wrote of Scheider: "No other leading actor can create so much tension out of such modest material." As of March 2025, Last Embrace holds a rating of 58% on Rotten Tomatoes, based on 26 reviews with the consensus: "Last Embrace benefits from a strong cast led by the ever-likable Roy Scheider, but its increasingly implausible story makes it difficult to hold on."

Demme called the movie "deeply, deeply flawed in many ways, although I also think it has some values. But I did it because I love that kind of picture, and I hate the idea of doing films that are similar."

== Home media ==
The film was released on Blu-Ray by Kino Lorber in 2014. A 4K Blu-Ray was released by Vinegar Syndrome (via their sublabel Cinématographe) in 2025.
