= Hider in the House (film) =

- Image used for the US VHS
- Directed by: Matthew Patrick
- Written by: Lem Dobbs
- Produced by: Michael Taylor; Edward Teets; Steven Reuther
- Starring: Gary Busey; Mimi Rogers; Michael McKean
- Cinematography: Jeff Jur
- Edited by: Debra T. Smith
- Music by: Christopher Young
- Distributed by: Vestron Pictures
- Release dates: October 18, 1989 (UK); August 22, 1991 (U.S.)
- Running time: 104 minutes
- Country: United States
- Language: English

Hider in the House is a 1989 psychological thriller directed by Matthew Patrick and starring Gary Busey and Mimi Rogers.

== Plot ==
Tom Sykes, a recently released psychiatric patient, finds refuge in the attic of the Dreyer family's new home. Using electronic surveillance, he spies on them, escalating to murder when the family dog, Rudolph, intervenes to protect them. Tom then fixates on the mother, Julie, intruding into her life by spying on her and sabotaging her relationship with her husband, Phil. He manipulates the Dreyers' son, Neal, teaching him fighting techniques.

As tensions rise, Phil leaves, providing Tom an opening to further insert himself into the family's life. Despite initial success, suspicions arise, especially from the neighbor Gene. Tom resorts to violence to maintain his façade, murdering anyone who uncovers his secrets. Julie eventually sees through his deception and rejects him, leading to a violent confrontation where Phil is severely injured.

Julie manages to defend herself and Phil, ultimately shooting Tom when he attempts to kill them. The police, summoned by Gene, arrive in time to save Julie, although Tom briefly survives, only to meet his end at the hands of law enforcement. Phil is rushed to the hospital, while Tom's body is taken to the morgue, bringing an end to the harrowing ordeal.

== Cast ==
- Gary Busey as Tom Sykes
  - Jake Busey as Tom Sykes as a teenager
- Mimi Rogers as Julie Dreyer
- Michael McKean as Phil Dreyer
- Kurt Christopher Kinder as Neil Dreyer
- Candace Hutson as Holly Dreyer
- Elizabeth Ruscio as Rita
- Chuck Lafont as Dr. Gordon
- Bruce Glover as Gene Hufford

== Production ==
A psychologist was hired as an adviser to make the sure the psychology of the Tom Sykes character was as realistic as possible. After a meeting with the psychologist, Gary Busey was excited, saying it was a "NAR film." He explained that NAR meant "No acting required." Gary said: "I am the character!"

== Writing ==
Hider in the House was the directorial debut of Matthew Patrick, who also reworked the film's script. One of the main things that was changed was that Tom Sykes, the main character and primary antagonist of the film, was originally more sympathetic. The original script showed that he grew up in an abusive household and his actions were motivated by a desperate craving for a family of his own. Because of this, he is unaware of his own strength and if he acts violently, it is done out of fear of a perceived threat.

Originally, the film ended with Sykes redeeming himself. In the original ending, Sykes attempted to burn down the house with the family in it, recreating what he did to his abusive family when he was a child. However, when he sees the terrified faces of the family, he realizes that he has become as evil as his parents. Though he has been rejected, he still loves this family. He pushes them out the window to safety.

As he watches them kiss and hug each other, Tom realizes he can never be a part of them, and lets the house burn down around him, killing himself. Although the studio was very supportive of the film director Matthew Patrick wanted to make, the studio eventually decided to have a more commercially safe Fatal Attraction-style ending, where Sykes becomes evil beyond redemption, attempts to murder the family and is eventually shot dead. This is eventually what was filmed and put into the film.

A couple years later, Matthew Patrick saw the film's executive producer, Steven Reuther, again at the Academy Awards. Reuther said, "you know what… I think you were right… that would have made a better ending." On this, Patrick said: "I really admire Steve, that he could say that."

== Release ==
The film was scheduled to be released in 1,200 theaters in the United States. Vestron was in financial trouble at the time and the movie was shelved, never receiving a theatrical release in the United States, and was screened only at film festivals. The film had a previous distribution agreement and was released theatrically in Europe, but only played for a week in a theater before it was pulled. However, it was given a U.K. cinema release on October 18, 1989 and an 18 rating.

The film received excellent reviews and notices wherever it opened. The movie won a Saturn Award for best home video release, which director Matthew Patrick only discovered many years later, after he was on the Director's Guild.

Hider in the House's earnings have never been confirmed.

=== Home media ===
On August 22, 1991, the film was released on videocassette (VHS) and laserdisc in the United States by Vestron Video.

The film was then released in 2001 on DVD in the United Kingdom by Columbia Tri-Star Home Video. Lions Gate Home Entertainment never announced any plans for a Region 1 DVD release. On October 14, 2025, it was released on Blu-ray as part of the Vestron Video Collector's Series.

== Reception ==
=== Critical response ===
In a Variety review, the film was praised as "an intelligent, gripping and sometimes compelling psychological thriller" with "attractive performances" by Rogers and Busey and that Matthew Patrick "directs with a good deal of thought and intelligence and does not rely on violence or shock value."

== See also ==
- List of films featuring home invasions
