= David Labiosa =

American actor (born 1961)

- Born: David Labiosa; October 4, 1961 (age 64); New York City, U.S.
- Occupation: Actor
- Years active: 1980–present

David Labiosa (born October 4, 1961) is an American actor in film and on television.

== Career ==
In film, Labiosa starred in the 1981 horror film The Entity as Billy, the son of Carla Moran.

Labiosa has appeared on television in series such as The Powers of Matthew Star, Silk Stalkings, Diagnosis Murder, NYPD Blue, CSI: Miami, Seinfeld and JAG.

Labiosa had a role in the 1988 season of CBS Schoolbreak in the episode Gangs where he starred as former gang member turned Army soldier Anthony Rojas.

Labiosa's most recognizable role was as the fired busboy in the Seinfeld episode "The Busboy", aired in 1991: Labiosa plays Antonio, who was fired after George Costanza and Elaine Benes lightly criticised him for leaving a menu to light on fire. George and Kramer go to apologize to the intimidating and muscular Antonio. In the end, Antonio is grateful for getting fired because the restaurant exploded the next day. To wrap the show, Antonio fights with Elaine's boyfriend.

In 2003, Labiosa played the role David Gomez, an associate of the Salazar narco-terrorist network in season 3 of the series 24.

== Filmography ==
=== Film ===
David Labiosa film credits
Year	Title	Role
1981	The Entity	Billy

=== Television ===
David Labiosa television credits
Year	Title	Role	Notes
1980	Death Penalty	Carlos Rivera	TV movie
1982	The Powers of Matthew Star	Tony Garcia	1 episode
1985	The Equalizer	Cristolides	Episode: "The Equalizer" (Pilot)
1992–1994	Silk Stalkings	Carlos Lopez / Manuel Garza (AKA El Nino)	2 episodes
1994	Diagnosis Murder	Kieran Conley	1 episode
1996	The lady in yellow	Tomas Aguillar	1 episode (death agreements)
2002	CSI: Miami	Senor Esparza	1 episode
1991	Seinfeld	Antonio	Episode: "The Busboy"
2004	JAG	Staff Sergeant	Episode: "People v. SecNav"
2003	24	David Gomez	3 episodes (season 3)
