= Feeling Minnesota =

1996 film by Steven Baigelman

- Theatrical release poster
- Directed by: Steven Baigelman
- Written by: Steven Baigelman
- Produced by: Danny DeVito; Michael Shamberg; Stacey Sher
- Starring: Keanu Reeves; Vincent D'Onofrio; Cameron Diaz; Delroy Lindo; Courtney Love; Tuesday Weld; Dan Aykroyd
- Cinematography: Walt Lloyd
- Edited by: Kristen Helsing; Martin Walsh; Thom Noble
- Music by: Los Lobos
- Production company: Jersey Films
- Distributed by: Fine Line Features
- Release date: September 13, 1996
- Running time: 99 minutes
- Country: United States
- Language: English
- Box office: $3.1 million

Feeling Minnesota is a 1996 American crime comedy film written and directed by Steven Baigelman. It stars Keanu Reeves, Vincent D'Onofrio, Cameron Diaz, Tuesday Weld, Dan Aykroyd and Delroy Lindo.

== Plot ==
Ex-stripper Freddie is marrying Sam Clayton to repay a debt owed to nightclub owner Red. At the wedding, Freddie meets Jjaks, Sam's brother, and they instantly fall in love. Jjaks and Freddie decide to run off together, eventually staying in a motel. After realizing that they do not have any money, Freddie and Jjaks decide to go back and steal some of Sam's money. Sam catches Jjaks in the act and they fight. After escaping, Jjaks returns to the motel, unaware that Sam has been following him. After Jjaks passes out due to the fight, Sam ends up shooting Freddie in the stomach in Jjaks's car and tries to frame the killing on him by returning Freddie's body to the motel room along with the murder weapon.

The next morning, Jjaks awakens, unable to recall anything that happened after his fight with Sam. Seeing Freddie's body in the room along with the gun, he briefly thinks that maybe he killed Freddie. After being tipped off by Sam, the police arrive but Jjaks hastily avoids capture, driving Freddie's body to a remote area in the woods to lay her to rest. All the while, Sam has been watching these events from afar, hoping for Jjaks's arrest.

Sam now calls a friend, Detective Ben Costikyan, who promptly arrests Jjaks. The trio, along with Costikyan's partner Lloyd, drive to where Freddie was supposedly buried. However, upon arrival, they are unable to find her. Angered at Sam for misleading him, Costikyan drives off with Lloyd, leaving the brothers beside the road.

Upon returning home, the brothers receive a phone call from the motel manager, who, based on seeing Sam carrying Freddie's body into the motel room and Jjaks carrying the body out of the room, wants $50,000 to keep quiet. Jjaks now realizes that Sam was setting him up for Freddie's murder. After another fight, they decide that Jjaks will go to the motel to talk to the manager while Sam will see Red, hoping for a loan.

At this point, Red has learned that Sam has been stealing money from him for the past year. Sam ends up shooting and killing Red after a brief skirmish and collects the $50,000 from a safe. Jjaks meets with the motel manager but sees Freddie's necklace on the floor of the manager's apartment. Confused and angry, Jjaks throws the manager outside and threatens to kill him. Suddenly out of nowhere, an alive Freddie walks towards them, calling for Jjaks, who faints. When he revives, she shows Jjaks her bullet wound and tells him that Sam is a bad shot and that someone picked her up from the side of the road where he had left her body.

The next morning, Sam calls Jjaks and tells him he got the money. However, after seeing Freddie alive from a nearby diner, he confronts Jjaks and Freddie in the manager's apartment. Sam ends up getting shot when the couple try to defend themselves. Costikyan enters the hotel room and suffocates Sam by holding his hand against his mouth. It turns out that Freddie had called Costikyan after being rescued and used him to help her get the $50,000. A betrayed and wounded Jjaks is left helpless.

Some time later, Costikyan is arrested in his underwear inside a hotel, as Freddie had tipped off the cops and left with the money. She and Jjaks have since fallen out but Jjaks, recalling her dream of being a dancer in Las Vegas, hitchhikes there. When he finds her living her dream, she happily says, "What took you so fucking long?" before they embrace.

== Cast ==
- Keanu Reeves as Jjaks Clayton
  - Drew Desmarais as Young Jjaks Clayton
- Vincent D'Onofrio as Sam Clayton
  - Aaron Michael Metchik as Young Sam Clayton
- Cameron Diaz as Freddie Clayton
- Delroy Lindo as Red
- Dan Aykroyd as Detective Ben Costikyan
- Courtney Love as Rhonda
- Tuesday Weld as Nora Clayton
- David Alan Smith as Detective Lloyd
- Michael Rispoli as Motel Manager
- Arabella Field as Manager's Wife
- John Carroll Lynch as Cop
- Max Perlich as Desk Clerk
- Bill Hermann as Driver
- Russell Konstans as Joseph

== Reception ==
On review aggregator website Rotten Tomatoes, Feeling Minnesota has a 14% approval rating based on 21 reviews. The site's critics consensus reads, "Clumsily derivative, shoddily assembled, and fundamentally miscast, Feeling Minnesota sets out for romantic comedy and gets irrevocably lost along the way."

Negative reviews said the plot felt too reminiscent of other films, particularly those of "Quentin Tarantino and the recent cycle of indies about lowlifes, petty criminals and wannabes". Variety's Emanuel Levy wrote, "Meant to be an offbeat, darkly comic tale of a triangle of losers desperately clinging to their versions of the American dream, pic comes across as a charmless high-concept indie." In contrast, Siskel & Ebert gave the film "two thumbs up." In his review, Roger Ebert awarded 3 out of 4 stars to the film and wrote, Steven Baigelman "creates a whimsical, grungy reality in which whenever the steamy love affair threatens to get boring, it is interrupted by an action scene". He praised Cameron Diaz's "range and comic ability" and said that the film, along with A Walk in the Clouds established Keanu Reeves "as one of the most gifted romantic leads of his generation".

== Soundtrack ==
Professional ratings
Review scores
| Source | Rating |
|---|---|
| AllMusic | 2/5 stars |

The soundtrack for the film was released in August 1996 through Atlantic Records. The album received a mixed review from AllMusic reviewer Stephen Thomas Erlewine, who ended his review with "the overall effect of the whole Feeling Minnesota juggernaut can't help but make you feel a little 'sick.' "

=== Track listing ===
| No. | Title | Writer(s) | Artist | Length |
|---|---|---|---|---|
| 1. | "Ring of Fire" | June Carter Cash, Merle Kilgore | Bob Dylan | 4:20 |
| 2. | "Shakey Ground" | Jeffrey Bowen, Al Boyd, Eddie Hazel | The Temptations | 4:02 |
| 3. | "Disagreeable" | Page Hamilton | Helmet | 3:45 |
| 4. | "Safe with Me" | Joe Henry | Joe Henry | 5:19 |
| 5. | "In My Mind" | Jonny Polonsky | Jonny Polonsky | 4:17 |
| 6. | "I Will Dare" | Paul Westerberg | The Replacements | 3:17 |
| 7. | "How Does That Grab You, Darlin?" | Lee Hazlewood | Nancy Sinatra | 2:34 |
| 8. | "Blasting Fonda" | Jeff Tweedy | Wilco | 4:17 |
| 9. | "You Can Have Her" | William S. Cook | The Righteous Brothers | 2:47 |
| 10. | "Family Affair" | Sylvester Stewart | Spearhead | 4:01 |
| 11. | "Looking at the World Through a Windshield" | Jerry Chestnut, Mike Hoyer | Son Volt | 3:08 |
| 12. | "Minnesota Medley" | | Los Lobos | 3:46 |
| Total length: | | | | 45:33 |
