= Michael Taylor (film producer) =

Michael Taylor is a film producer and also the former (2004–2014) Chairman of the Division of Film and Television Production at the University of Southern California School of Cinematic Arts.

Taylor is a producer of theatrical and television films. He began his career as a Motion Picture Executive at United Artists Corporation, and served as UA's European Head of Production based in London. Among other honors, he is the recipient of the Emmy Award, the Fourteenth Annual Genesis Award for Outstanding Feature Film, the National Board of Review Award for Top Independent Film, The Variety/EDI $100 Million Award, and is a member of The Academy of Motion Picture Arts and Sciences. Taylor is also the Founder of the University of Southern California's Media Institute for Social Change (USCMISC) at the School of Cinematic Arts. USCMISC is a nonprofit organization of industry professionals who use cinema to create an awareness of social issues and inspire positive actions throughout the world.

In 1985, he set up a joint venture, with Earle Mack to set up development deals with four pictures through Mack-Taylor Productions, which included two for RKO Pictures and one for Warner Bros. and 20th Century Fox each, with the company setting up headquarters in New York City.

== Filmography ==
He was a producer in all films unless otherwise noted.

=== Film ===
Year	Film	Credit
1979	Last Embrace	
1981	The Pursuit of D. B. Cooper	
1989	Hider in the House	
1995	Mrs. Munck	
1996	Bottle Rocket	Executive producer
1996	Phenomenon	
1999	The Hi-Line	Executive producer
1999	Instinct	
2006	Copying Beethoven	

Thanks

Year	Film	Role
2018	Mapplethorpe	Special thanks

=== Television ===
Year	Title	Credit	Notes
2001	Princess of Thieves	Executive producer	Television film
2003	Phenomenon II	Executive producer	Television film
2005	The Commuters	Executive producer	Television film
2007	America's Iliad: The Siege of Charleston	Associate producer	Television film
2013	CBS2 KCAL9 Presents: The Power of the PSA	Executive producer	Documentary
2021	The Shift Wellness Rally	Executive producer	
