= Spectrophilia =

Type of sexual hallucination

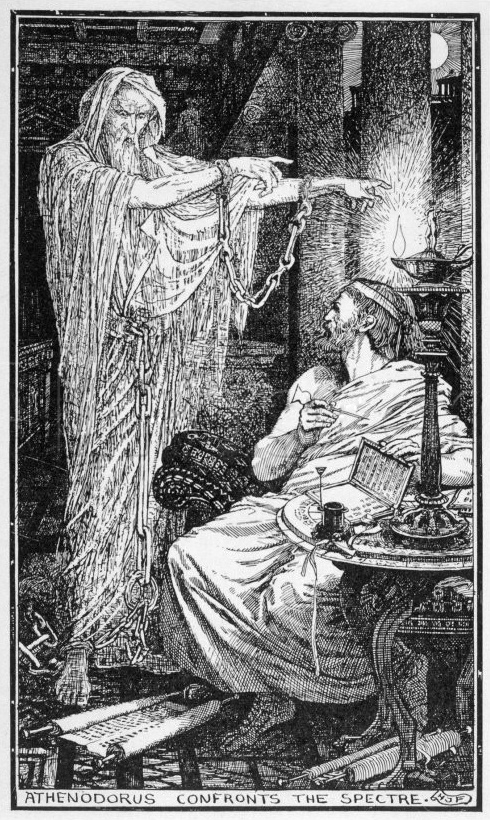
The Greek Stoic Philosopher Athenodorus Rents a Haunted House

Spectrophilia, also known as Phasmophilia, is sexual attraction to either ghosts or sexual arousal from images in mirrors, as well as the alleged phenomenon of sexual encounters between ghosts and humans.

== Definition ==
Spectrophilia is a fetish that is classified as the paraphilia in which one is attracted to ghosts or spirits. Spectrophiliacs fantasize about ghosts and often imagine scenarios involving sexual events between themselves or others and spirits. It is also used to refer to purported incidents of sexual interactions between humans and ghosts or spirits.

== Research ==
Accounts of paranormal encounters with ghosts and spirits frequently include sexual encounters, which are often described as being nonconsensual or unpleasant. Many traditional ghost stories and legends include some element of seduction or temptation. Stories featuring female ghosts who lure men to their deaths are especially common, such as the Latin American legend of La Llorona. In Western folklore, the succubus and incubus parallel the modern phenomenon of spectrophilia. A succubus is a demon or evil spirit that takes on a female human form to seduce men and drain them of semen or energy. The counterpart of the succubus is the incubus. The incubus is a demon that is said to take on a male human form. The incubus, much like the succubus, is said to seduce women into sex with the objective of impregnating them. The Mare is another example from European folklore.

These accounts have been linked to the documented phenomenon of sleep paralysis, in which individuals experience hallucinations which often involve spectral figures. The prevalence of sexual elements in these hallucinations is theorized to be due to repressed sexual frustration or anxiety. Folklorist David Hufford estimated that approximately 15% of the population had experienced the phenomenon at least once in their lives.

Despite the lack of scientific evidence for the phenomenon of spectrophilia, it has become a frequently talked-about subject among ghost hunters, including Ghost Adventures and the Travel Channel show Ghostly Lovers. Online forums also contributed to the belief in sexual encounters with ghosts, as well as the idea that they were not necessarily harmful.

Many stories about romance between humans and ghosts, especially men and female ghosts, appear in the book Strange Tales from a Chinese Studio by Pu Songling.

== In fiction ==
Several films have dealt with the concept, among them The Entity (1982), Ghostbusters (1984), Star Trek: The Next Generation (Season 7), Ghost (1990), Scary Movie 2 (2001), Dusk Maiden of Amnesia (2008) and American Horror Story: Murder House (2011).

The Phantom of the Opera is a story with spectrophilic elements.

Many Romantic ballet plots involve ghostly women and dancers dressed in ghostly white costumes, such as the Wilis of Giselle or Sylphides in La Sylphide.

Madonna's song "Supernatural" involves the singer's intimacy with a ghost.

In a Regular Show episode “The Postcard”, Hi Five Ghost has a mortal human soulmate named Celia.
