= Phenomenon (film) =

1996 American romantic fantasy drama film

- Theatrical release poster
- Directed by: Jon Turteltaub
- Written by: Gerald Di Pego
- Produced by: Barbara Boyle; Michael Taylor; Charles Newirth
- Starring: John Travolta; Kyra Sedgwick; Forest Whitaker; Robert Duvall
- Cinematography: Phedon Papamichael
- Edited by: Bruce Green
- Music by: Thomas Newman
- Production company: Touchstone Pictures
- Distributed by: Buena Vista Pictures Distribution
- Release date: July 3, 1996
- Running time: 123 minutes
- Country: United States
- Language: English
- Budget: $32 million
- Box office: $152 million

Phenomenon is a 1996 American romantic fantasy drama film directed by Jon Turteltaub, written by Gerald Di Pego. In it, an amiable, small-town everyman is inexplicably transformed into a genius with telekinetic powers. It stars John Travolta, Kyra Sedgwick, Forest Whitaker, Robert Duvall, and Jeffrey DeMunn. The original music score was composed and conducted by Thomas Newman.

== Plot ==
George Malley is an auto mechanic in a town in Northern California. He has a crush on single mother Lace. He lets her sell her handmade chairs at his shop, but secretly buys them himself. She is very closed off and rebuffs George's advances. After celebrating his 37th birthday at a bar with his best friend, Nate, and father figure, Doc Brunder, he sees a ball of shining bright white lights in the sky, which grows closer until it hits him with a loud bang, knocking him down. Nobody else sees the lights or hears the sound.

George begins to exhibit remarkable levels of intelligence. He easily absorbs vast amounts of information, formulates new, revolutionary ideas, and develops telekinesis. Not needing sleep, he spends each night reading multiple books.

George tries to use his new intelligence for the good of his community. He develops a powerful fertilizer, improves solar panel designs, and predicts an earthquake without any equipment. When Doc is called to aid a sick Portuguese man, George learns the language in minutes and helps translate. He then uses his telekinesis to rescue the man's young relative. George also formulates a plan to help Nate get together with Ella, the mother of the Portuguese boy he rescued. Nate is an amateur radio operator. While visiting him, George decodes and responds to a signal, though Nate asks him to forget about it, fearful they might be picking up information from a nearby air force base.

The townsfolk become wary, but George finds support from Doc, Nate, and from a growing relationship with Lace, and her children, Al and Glory. George invites Lace to join him on a trip to U.C. Berkeley to meet with seismologist Professor Ringold about George's earthquake prediction. Before he can go, the FBI takes George and Nate into custody over his code-breaking. He breaks more codes, then astounds Dr. Nierdof by answering a series of difficult quizzes and exams, and shows him his telekinesis. When George threatens to talk to the press, he is finally released. The FBI instructs Dr. Ringold not to let George meet with anyone at Berkeley.

Returning to the local bar, George becomes frustrated with friends' questions about his abilities, and he causes a large mirror to break via telekinesis.

Lace visits him to provide a shave and a haircut. Their innocent intimacy scares her, since she has tried so hard to not like him, but it encourages him to stop avoiding the townsfolk. He goes to the county fair to ease fear with a demonstration of his powers, but the crowd goes into a frenzy, demanding his attention and his perceived healing powers. George is knocked to the ground, where he again sees the flashing balls of light before losing consciousness.

George awakens in a hospital where it has been discovered that he has a brain tumor. Dr. Wellin, a leading brain surgeon, has arrived to try to surgically remove the tumor. Dr. Wellin determines there is only a 1-in-500 chance of survival, but wants to proceed with an invasive operation solely to do research on George's living brain. When George refuses, saying he still has work to do, the doctor has him declared mentally unfit and held against his will.

George escapes from the hospital and returns home. He spends time with Nate, then goes to Lace's to spend time with her and her children. The FBI agent shows up, but Lace persuades them to let George die in peace. During the evening, in their final embrace, George tells Lace "It's happening."

Professor Ringold arrives at Lace's house, only to learn that he is too late. Lace gives him George's research materials, so he can finish George's breakthrough work.

A year later, George's friends are gathered for what would have been his 38th birthday. Nate is now fluent in Portuguese and is married to Ella, who is pregnant. Other signs of George's phenomenal effects on the town and its people are all around.

== Cast ==
- John Travolta as George Malley
- Kyra Sedgwick as Lace Pennamin
- Forest Whitaker as Nate Pope
- Jeffrey DeMunn as Prof. John Ringold
- Robert Duvall as Doc Brunder
- Richard Kiley as Dr. Wellin
- Brent Spiner as Dr. Bob Nierdof
- Vyto Ruginis as Ted Rhome
- Bruce Young as FBI Agent Jack Hatch
- Michael Milhoan as Jimmy
- Sean O'Bryan as Banes
- David Gallagher as Al Pennamin
- Ashley Buccille as Glory Pennamin
- Elisabeth Nunziato as Ella
- Tony Genaro as Tito

== Production ==
According to screenwriter Gerald Di Pego, the philosophy of Zen influenced the conception of George's tapping of his mind's potential. The movie also draws influence from Scientology, which actor John Travolta is a member of, drawing from L. Ron Hubbard's book Dianetics.

== Reception ==
=== Box office ===
The film grossed more than $16 million on its opening weekend, debuting in third position and later reaching second. It finally grossed $104,636,382 in the United States and $47.4 million elsewhere, grossing approximately $152 million overall.

=== Critical ===
On Rotten Tomatoes, the film has an approval rating of 49% based on reviews from 37 critics, with an average rating of 5.9/10. On Metacritic, it has a score of 41% based on reviews from 17 critics, indicating "mixed or average reviews". Audiences polled by CinemaScore gave the film an average grade of "A-" on an A+ to F scale.

Roger Ebert of Chicago Sun-Times gave the film three out of four stars, questioning if it could have been more challenging but remarking, "But that's not what it's about. It's about change, acceptance, and love, and it rounds those three bases very nicely, even if it never quite gets to home."

James Berardinelli, on ReelViews, compared the film to Forrest Gump, but with "half of Forrest's intelligence". The script he criticized as "abysmal", calling the first section "light, airy, and poorly-focused", the second as "manipulative" and detects it as "loaded with the kind of doctrine that Scientologists preach".

Janet Maslin of The New York Times, complimented the concept but said "during the grimness of the film's final half hour, jaws may drop. A whopping wrong turn throws this lightweight, benign-looking movie terminally off course." Empire magazine's Angie Errigo rated the film three out of five stars. She complained about the film's tendency to overexplain itself, but complimented Travolta's performance.

== See also ==
- Phenomenon (soundtrack)
