= Birth of the Dragon =

2016 film by George Nolfi

- Theatrical release poster
- Directed by: George Nolfi
- Written by: Christopher Wilkinson; Stephen J. Rivele
- Based on: "Bruce Lee's Toughest Fight" by Michael Dorgan
- Produced by: Michael London; Janice Williams; James Hong Pang; Leo Shi Young; Stephen J. Rivele; Christopher Wilkinson
- Starring: Philip Wan-lung Ng; Xia Yu; Jin Xing; Qu Jingjing; Ron Yuan; Billy Magnussen
- Cinematography: Amir Mokri
- Edited by: Joel Viertel
- Music by: H. Scott Salinas; Reza Safinia
- Production companies: Groundswell Productions; Kylin Pictures; Anomaly Entertainment
- Distributed by: OTL Releasing; BH Tilt; WWE Studios
- Release dates: September 13, 2016 (TIFF); August 25, 2017 (United States)
- Running time: 89 minutes
- Country: United States
- Languages: English; Mandarin
- Budget: $31 million
- Box office: $7.2 million

Birth of the Dragon is a 2016 American martial arts action film depicting a fictional account on the supposedly true story revolving around Bruce Lee who, as a young martial artist, challenged kung fu master Wong Jack-man in 1964 in San Francisco. The film was directed by George Nolfi, and written by Christopher Wilkinson and Stephen J. Rivele. Philip Wan-lung Ng portrays Lee, starring alongside Xia Yu, Jin Xing, Qu Jingjing, Ron Yuan, and Billy Magnussen.

Principal photography began in Vancouver, Canada on November 17, 2015. Birth of the Dragon was selected to be screened in the Special Presentations section at the 2016 Toronto International Film Festival, and was released in select theaters on August 25, 2017, by OTL Releasing, BH Tilt and WWE Studios. The film received negative reviews from critics.

== Plot ==
In 1964, a young Bruce Lee owns and operates a San Francisco Kung Fu Academy, specializing in the Chinese martial art Wing Chun. Lee provides advice, roles as extras, and defends them from Chinatown gangs. One student, Steve McKee, spars with Lee while fighting in anger, causing Lee to counter and embarrass him. McKee and Vinnie Wei work for Wei's mother's laundry business, where they learn Wong Jack-man is observing the American kung fu scene. While carrying out a delivery to the China Gate restaurant, McKee falls for an employee, Xiulan, who is forbidden to communicate with outsiders. McKee sneaks into the restaurant to give Xiulan an English grammar book so that she can develop her language skills, as well as teach her roommates basic English.

McKee acquaints himself with Wong, who is working as a dishwasher. Lee worries about Wong's presence, thinking he would be punished for teaching whites kung fu and asks McKee to set up a meeting. At the Long Beach International Karate Championships, Lee performs a karate exhibition against his kung fu and debuts his famous one-inch punch. Among those in attendance, Lee points out Wong in the audience. Wong commends Lee's skill and technique but notices that Lee is his own limitation. Lee challenges him to a fight as Wong leaves in peace. McKee learns that Wong is in America to perform penance working as a dishwasher because of a near-fatal kick, the Mon Shan. Realizing that teaching McKee would help liberate himself, Wong takes McKee as his student. Meeting up with Lee, who tells him that he would begin filming The Green Hornet, McKee reveals his intention to end his time at Lee's academy. The relationship between McKee and Wong captures the attention of Auntie Blossom, a gangster who owns the China Gate. She says that if McKee gets both martial artists to fight, she will release Xiulan. Wong appears at Lee's academy and accepts his challenge. Despite Auntie Blossom's conditions, Xiulan refuses to leave without her roommates, who are all under the control of Wing Lo. Lee reluctantly agrees to fight under Wong's conditions: only 12 witnesses at an empty warehouse, and the winner is revealed in the newspaper the next day.

Auntie Blossom, McKee, and a few other spectators bear witness to the private match. Lee's aggressive style of Wing Chun gains him the upper hand, drawing first blood. Wong's traditional style of Shaolin is fluid, countering Lee, enraging him. They engage until reaching the top of an unfinished staircase, which Wong uses to show Lee the limitation of his style. Wong leaps down to the floor with grace, and Lee follows suit as a symbol of exceeding his own limits. They continue to fight until Wong is knocked down and attempts the Mon Shan, which Lee prepares to parry. They stop and show their mutual respect with a bow, ending the fight. With no winner formally announced and $15 million ($156 million today) in bets still in the balance, Auntie Blossom keeps the girls until one concedes.

Lee contemplates his style, knowing he could have been killed during the fight. McKee demands Wong declare himself the victor to Auntie Blossom; however, Wong says he won the fight by virtue of showing Lee a new path after exceeding his limitation. Wei notifies Lee that McKee has grown desperate to release Xiulan from captivity and has been beaten by gangsters. Lee teams up with Wong to help their mutual student. Lee, Wong, and McKee confront Auntie Blossom and her boss, Wing Lo. Wong concedes, declaring Lee to be the winner. However, Lee only accepts on the condition that Lo frees all captive girls in Chinatown. Lo's nephew attempts to shoot Lee with a shotgun, but Lee swiftly performs the Mon Shan, knocking him out. While visiting McKee at the hospital, Lee reveals his desire to develop a new, more fluid and expressive style. McKee and Xiulan bid farewell to Wong before boarding his ship back to China. Wong firmly believes that Lee is the right person to show kung fu to the world.

In a closing disclaimer, Lee had altered his fighting style. In July 1969, he introduced Jeet Kune Do, the forerunner of mixed martial arts.

== Cast ==
- Philip Wan-lung Ng as Bruce Lee
- Xia Yu as Wong Jack-man
- Billy Magnussen as Steve McKee
- Jin Xing as Auntie Blossom
- Qu Jingjing as Xiulan Quan
- Ron Yuan as Tony Yu
- Terry Chen as Frankie Chen
- Vanness Wu as Sonny Lo

== Production ==
On February 19, 2013, it was announced that a biopic titled Birth of the Dragon about young martial artist Bruce Lee was in development, writing Christopher Wilkinson and Stephen J. Rivele. QED International and Groundswell Productions would finance and produce the film along with their Bill Block and Michael London, respectively. While Wilkinson and Rivele would also produce the film. On May 30, 2014, George Nolfi was announced to be the director of the film, and Janice Williams was also attached as producer. In June 2015, there was a casting call for the role of Lee, in search for a 20 to 30 years old martial arts expert. Mike Moh was under consideration for the titular role. On November 16, 2015, the film's cast was announced and it included Billy Magnussen as a martial arts student, Steve McKee, fashioned on Steve McQueen; Philip Ng as Bruce Lee; Xia Yu as Wong Jack-man; Jingjing Qu as McKee's love interest, Xiulan; and Jin Xing as the brutal crime boss, Auntie Blossom. Chinese company Kylin Films came on board to finance the film, while QED left the project, Groundswell would still produce the film. London would be the producer along with Janice Williams, Wilkinson, Rivele, and Kylin's James H. Pang, while Leo Shi Young, David Nicksay, and Nolfi would executive produce, and Helen Y. Zhong, Jaeson Ma, and Joel Viertel would co-produce the film. Corey Yuen came on board to design the film's action sequences, which is set in 1965 in and around Oakland and San Francisco, about the actual fight between Shaolin Master Jack-man and the young Lee.

=== Filming ===
Filming was previously scheduled to begin at the North Shore Studios in Vancouver, British Columbia on October 28, 2015. Principal photography on the film began on November 17, 2015, in the Metro Vancouver area. Filming would last through January 24, 2016.

== Reception ==
=== Box office ===
In North America, Birth of the Dragon was released on August 25, 2017, alongside All Saints and Leap!, and was projected to gross around $3 million from 1,618 theaters in its opening weekend. It made $1.1 million on its first day and $2.7 million over the weekend, finishing 8th at the box office. The film's low opening was attributed to Hurricane Harvey hitting Texas and surrounding areas causing theaters to close, the boxing match between Floyd Mayweather and Conor McGregor on Saturday, and a negative response from critics and fans.

=== Critical response ===
On Rotten Tomatoes the film has an approval rating of 25% based on 52 reviews, with an average rating of 4.3/10. On Metacritic, the film has a score of 35 out of 100, based on reviews from 13 critics, indicating "generally unfavorable" reviews. Audiences polled by CinemaScore gave the film an average grade of "B" on an A+ to F scale.

Scout Tafoya, reviewer for Roger Ebert, gave the movie zero stars, writing, "How, this far into the 21st century, does a film like this get made? One that shunts Bruce Lee to the status of secondary character in a lazy and boringly familiar star-crossed romance? There are entire books and countless articles about the Wong Jack-man & Bruce Lee fight, and this film invents things wholesale to pad its running time? Why? Who could possibly be expected to care about fictitious Steve McKee and his quest to save an equally fictitious love interest from a likely even more fictitious crime boss?" Andrew Parker, reviewer for The Globe and Mail, also gave the film a negative review, saying: "In reality, it's about a struggling white actor begging both martial-arts notables to help him free a girl he's sweet on from Chinese mob-controlled sex slavery."

The film has drawn accusations of "whitewashing" from fans and critics, who said that the Bruce Lee film unfairly focused on a fictional male white character, Steve McKee, who is presented as Lee's friend. This also drew criticism to the film's advertisement of being based on "a true story" as the main character is not real.

Shannon Lee, the daughter of Bruce Lee, distanced herself from the film, saying that the film, like others about her father, "lack a complete understanding of his philosophies and artistry. They haven't captured the essence of his beliefs in martial arts or storytelling." She went on to claim that one has to "generate your own material" to avoid misrepresentation.

The film won the Golden Angel Award at the 12th Chinese American Film Festival.

== See also ==
- Portrayal of East Asians in American film and theater
