= The Entity =

- Theatrical release poster
- Directed by: Sidney J. Furie
- Screenplay by: Frank De Felitta
- Based on: The Entity by Frank De Felitta
- Produced by: Harold Schneider
- Starring: Barbara Hershey
- Cinematography: Stephen H. Burum
- Edited by: Frank J. Urioste
- Music by: Charles Bernstein
- Production company: American Cinema Productions
- Distributed by: 20th Century Fox
- Release dates: September 30, 1982 (United Kingdom); February 4, 1983 (United States)
- Running time: 125 minutes
- Country: United States
- Language: English
- Budget: $9 million–$10 million
- Box office: $13.3 million

The Entity is a 1982 American supernatural horror film directed by Sidney J. Furie, and starring Barbara Hershey, Ron Silver, David Labiosa, Maggie Blye, Jacqueline Brookes, and Alex Rocco. The film follows a single mother in Los Angeles who is raped and tormented by an invisible poltergeist-like entity in her home. It was adapted for the screen by Frank De Felitta from his 1978 novel of the same name, which was based on the 1974 case of Doris Bither, a woman who claimed to have been repeatedly sexually assaulted by an invisible assailant. Bither's case was documented by doctoral students in the now-defunct parapsychology department at the University of California, Los Angeles.

Principal photography of The Entity took place over a ten week-period in Los Angeles and El Segundo, California, in the spring of 1981. Despite being completed and planned for a release later that year, the film went unreleased until the fall of 1982, when it was acquired by 20th Century Fox and given a theatrical release in the United Kingdom. It was released in the United States on February 4, 1983. The film grossed over $13 million at the box office against a $9 million budget and received moderately favorable critical reviews as well as acclaim for Hershey's performance. It has gone on to receive further praise from contemporary film critics.

In addition to its paranormal elements, the film deals with themes of female sexual victimhood, sexual repression, and the family dynamics of single-parent households. It was met with some controversy from women's rights and feminist organizations during its original release due to its graphic depictions of female sexual assault.

== Plot ==
One night, single mother Carla Moran is violently raped in her Los Angeles bungalow by an invisible assailant. A subsequent episode of poltergeist activity causes her to flee with her children to the home of her sister and her husband. They return to Carla's home and the following day, Carla is nearly killed when her car mysteriously goes out of control in traffic. Urged by Cindy to see a psychiatrist, Carla meets with Dr. Sneiderman and tentatively agrees to undergo therapy. A subsequent attack in her bathroom leaves bite marks and bruises, which Carla shows to Dr. Sneiderman, who believes they are self-inflicted despite being in places impossible for her to reach.

Sneiderman drives Carla home and meets her children. She explains to him that she suffered a variety of traumas in her childhood and adolescence, including sexual molestation, teenage pregnancy, and the violent death of her first husband. Dr. Sneiderman believes her apparent paranormal experiences are delusions resulting from her past psychological trauma but agrees to keep an open mind at her request. Shortly after Sneiderman leaves, Carla is attacked again, this time in front of her children. Her son tries to intervene, but he is hit by electrical discharges and his wrist is broken.

Carla attends a staff meeting chaired by Sneiderman's colleague, Dr. Weber. As soon as she leaves, Weber shares his belief that the experiences of the Moran household are the output of a mass delusion arising from Carla's damaged psyche, sexual frustration and propensity to masturbate. That night, Carla is tricked by the entity into having an orgasm while she sleeps by appearing to stimulate her nipples. The next day, Sneiderman urges Carla to commit herself to a psychiatric hospital for observation, but she refuses and becomes angry when Sneiderman goes so far as to suggest she has incestuous feelings for her son.

After Cindy witnesses an attack, the two discuss possible supernatural causes. While visiting a local bookstore, Carla happens to meet two parapsychologists, whom she convinces to visit her home. Initially skeptical, they witness several paranormal events and agree to study the home under the supervision of their team leader, Dr. Cooley. During their study, Sneiderman arrives and tries to convince Carla that the manifestation is in her mind, but she dismisses him. Reassured that her case is taken seriously, Carla begins to relax. Her boyfriend, Jerry Anderson, visits one night and witnesses Carla being held down on the bed by the entity while being raped and noticeably fondled by invisible fingers. Confused and horrified, he attempts to fight off the entity. Hearing the commotion, Carla's son enters the room and believes that Jerry is harming her, prompting him to attack Jerry. Later at the hospital, Jerry is so troubled by the experience that he ends their relationship.

Desperate for a solution, Carla agrees to participate in an elaborate experiment carried out by Cooley's team. A full mock-up of her home is created to lure the entity into a trap and freeze it with liquid helium. Before the experiment begins, Sneiderman tries to convince Carla to leave, confirming an unorthodox personal interest in her predicament. The entity arrives but unexpectedly takes control of the helium jets, using them against Carla. She defiantly stands up to it, stating that it may kill her, but it will never have her. At this precise point, the tanks explode and flood the premises with liquid helium. Sneiderman rushes in just in time to save her. As everyone watches, they realize that the entity is far bigger than anyone imagined and has been trapped in a huge mass of ice. It breaks free and vanishes almost immediately, but Sneiderman realizes that Carla has been telling the truth.

Dr. Cooley believes that, despite the destruction of the ice block, she has a valuable witness in Dr. Weber. Much to her chagrin, however, Weber decides to take refuge in the belief that he did not witness anything. Carla returns to her house the next day. The front door slams by itself and she is greeted menacingly by a disembodied demonic voice which says, "Welcome home, cunt." She calmly opens the door, exits the house, gets in a car with her family and leaves. A closing intertitle verifies that Carla and her family have moved to Texas. Carla still experiences attacks from the entity, although they have lessened in frequency and severity.

== Cast ==
- Barbara Hershey as Carla Moran, a single mother, who is the victim of the unseen entity.
- Ron Silver as Dr. Phil Sneiderman, a skeptical psychiatrist, who believes Carla's trauma is psychological.
- David Labiosa as Billy Moran, Carla's teenage son.
- George Coe as Dr. Weber, one of Dr. Sneiderman's colleagues.
- Margaret Blye as Cindy Nash, Carla's best friend, and George's wife.
- Jacqueline Brookes as Dr. Elizabeth Cooley, the leader of the parapsychology team.
- Michael Alldredge as George Nash, Cindy's husband.
- Alex Rocco as Jerry Anderson, Carla's boyfriend.
- Allan Rich as Dr. Walcott, one of Dr. Sneiderman's colleagues.
- Richard Brestoff as Gene Kraft, a member of the parapsychology team.
- Raymond Singer as Joe Mehan, a member of the parapsychology team.
- Natasha Ryan as Julie Moran, Carla's younger daughter.
- Melanie Gaffin as Kim Moran, Carla's youngest daughter.

== Themes ==
Film scholar Daniel Kremer interprets The Entity as a parable for female sexual victimhood, citing the lead character of Carla Moran as a woman who "goes head-to-head with a gaggle of men (including the "entity" itself). If the men of the film do not undermine her credibility or sanity, they objectify her, exploit her victimhood, belittle her ability to take control of her unfortunate circumstances, and ultimately give her the dignity of a glorified lab rat."

Brad Stevens of the British Film Institute notes that the film deals with themes of sexual assault as well as a "fantasy" figure that serves as a surrogate for the absent father in the household, a theme he compares to the extraterrestrial in Steven Spielberg's E.T. the Extra-Terrestrial, released the same year. Despite some of the film's contemporary elements, Stevens also notes that it follows a classically Gothic narrative structure. Michael Doyle, writing for Rue Morgue magazine, describes the entity in the film as akin to an incubus, a demon that sexually assaults sleeping women.

== Production ==
=== Screenplay ===
Screenwriter Frank De Felitta adapted the screenplay from his novel, which was based on the case of Doris Bither, a woman who alleged that she had been sexually assaulted by an invisible supernatural entity on numerous occasions. The screenplay, like the novel, introduces several elements that were not investigated as part of the Bither case (including the allegations of spectral rape and the capture of an entity).

In an interview with Rue Morgue magazine in July 2012, director Sidney J. Furie told journalist Michael Doyle that he did not consider The Entity to be a horror film in spite of its extreme imagery, unsettling atmosphere and horrific plot. Instead, Furie said he considers The Entity to be more of a "supernatural suspense movie." Furie also confessed that he intentionally avoided researching the case upon which The Entity is based as he "did not want to judge the characters and story in any way." Neither he nor actress Barbara Hershey met with Doris Bither, the woman on whom the character of Carla Moran was based.

=== Casting ===
"Barbara's performance is very unusual in that it almost seems to belong to a documentary rather than a suspense film. It's very real. You don't see the acting. You don't see the wheels turning, and that's what great actors do."

— Director Sidney Furie on Hershey's performance

Several actresses were considered for the role of Carla Moran, including Jill Clayburgh, Sally Field, Jane Fonda, and Bette Midler, but all four declined the offer. Barbara Hershey was cast in the role only ten days before production was scheduled to begin. Hershey had hesitations about the part due to the nudity in the screenplay, but agreed to it after director Sidney J. Furie assured her the nude sequences would be accomplished via body doubles and mannequins. Recalling her casting, Hershey said: "I was frightened. I didn't know how it would be edited or marketed. But I knew that Sid saw potential in the film to approach the subject from a humanistic and psychiatric viewpoint, from a mother's viewpoint... and I felt it was a worthwhile risk." Neither Hershey nor Furie met the real Doris Bither in preparation for the film.

Ron Silver was cast as Dr. Sniderman, the psychologist who questions the supernatural nature of Carla's attacks, while Alex Rocco was given the part of Jerry, her absent boyfriend. Furie had originally sought Craig T. Nelson for the role of Jerry, but producer Harold Schneider refused to cast Nelson. David Labiosa, a New York-based actor, was cast as Carla's teenage son Billy, based on his performance in the television film Death Penalty (1980) opposite Colleen Dewhurst.

=== Filming ===
The Entity was an independent production made under a tax shelter by the newly established production company American Cinema International Productions, and had originally been optioned to Roman Polanski. The film was financed as part of a package deal along with I, the Jury (1982) and Tough Enough (1983).

Principal photography of The Entity began in Los Angeles on March 30, 1981. The shoot lasted a period of ten weeks, and was completed in late June 1981. Furie was pleased with the small production, later commenting: "There were no extras waiting in buses, no six camera crews, no bullshit. And at every point, we knew the film was working pretty well." The exteriors of the Moran home were shot at a house in El Segundo, while a set was constructed in Los Angeles for the home's interiors. Stylistically, Furie and his cinematographer, Stephen H. Burum, employed frequent use of close-ups and Dutch angles. The shoot was temporarily halted when Labiosa accidentally broke his wrist while filming a scene in which he is thrown backward by the entity. Labiosa's injury resulted in him being written out of several scenes.

During filming, Furie excised a subplot involving overt incestuous feelings between Carla and her son, Billy. A dream sequence in the original screenplay featured Carla fantasizing about taking her son's virginity. Labiosa recalled: "I think it was awkward for everyone to do, because of what the whole thing implied. I often wonder what the film would have been like had they kept it in." According to Labiosa, a scene was filmed in which Carla observes Billy shirtless outside, which hinted at this subplot, but this scene was cut from the film.

The majority of the special effects in the film were achieved with practical methods, and were supervised by Stan Winston. For example, the scene in which Carla's nude body is groped by the entity was shot featuring a latex dummy body with suction cups built inside, which allowed crew members to manipulate it to appear as though fingers were making impressions on her flesh; Hershey's body, aside from her head, was hidden beneath the bed during this scene. The construction of the dummy body cost the production $65,000 to create.

The film would be among the final productions made by American Cinema Productions before it filed for bankruptcy in December 1981.

== Release ==
Universal Pictures initially expressed interest in distributing The Entity, as the studio felt it might have "some commercial value," but it was ultimately acquired by 20th Century Fox. The film opened first in the United Kingdom on September 30, 1982, where it was given an X rating. It opened in the United States on February 4, 1983, with little pre-publicity.

=== Home media ===
CBS/Fox Video released The Entity on VHS in 1983. Anchor Bay Entertainment released the film on DVD in 2005, and later issued a standalone Blu-ray disc on July 3, 2012.

In December 2016, Eureka Entertainment released a dual format DVD and Blu-ray set in the United Kingdom in exclusive steelbook packaging, sold exclusively through Zavvi. On June 11, 2019, Scream Factory released a collector's edition Blu-ray disc of the film featuring new interviews and other newly commissioned bonus material.

== Reception and legacy ==
=== Box office ===
The film grossed $3.7 million during its opening weekend in the U.S., and went on to gross a total of $13.3 million.

=== Controversy ===
Upon its release in the United Kingdom, the film was met by protests from women's rights groups who deemed it offensive due to its graphic depictions of sexual assault. In response to the protests against the film, star Barbara Hershey publicly responded, telling a reporter: "I resent being put in the position of defending the film. We worked really hard not to make it exploitative. Rape is one of the ugliest if not the ugliest thing that can happen to someone. It's murder of a sort. I have no answer for those people who are offended."

=== Critical response ===
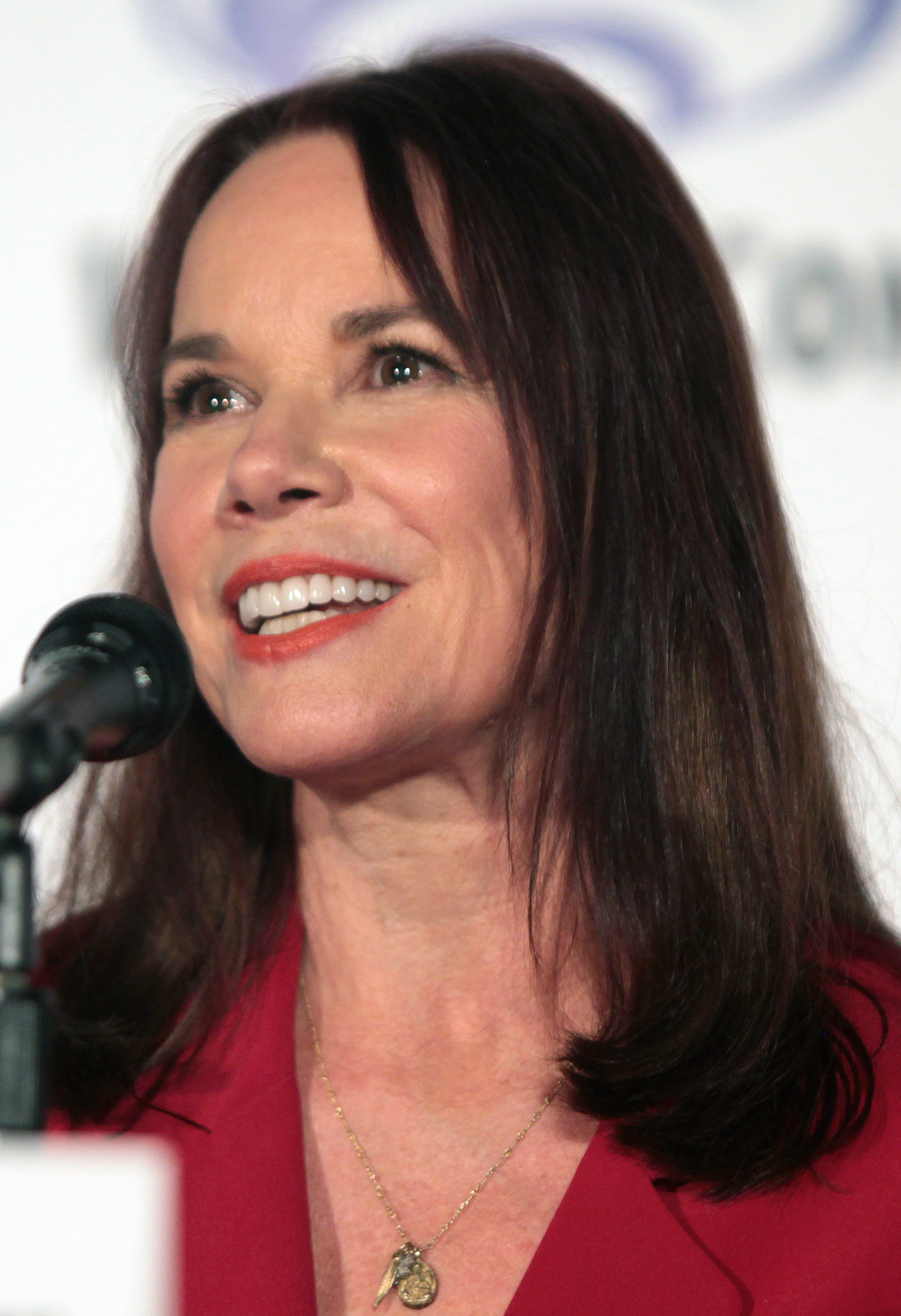
Barbara Hershey received critical acclaim for her performance

On the review aggregator website Rotten Tomatoes, 62% of 13 critics' reviews are positive, with an average rating of 5.8/10. Metacritic, which uses a weighted average, assigned the film a score of 35 out of 100, based on 5 critics, indicating "generally unfavorable" reviews.

Richard F. Shepard, in a New York Times review, praised Hershey's performance but went on to say "The Entity offers thrills in short staccato bursts and dull science in long bursts." Critic Roger Ebert, who also put the film in a 1987 episode of At the Movies about cinematic guilty pleasures, praised the film for Hershey's performance, deeming it her "comeback" and describing her portrayal of a struggling single mother as "touching." Bill Kaufman of Newsday praised the film's "straightforward" approach to its material, and praised both Hershey and Silver's performances. Kevin Thomas of the Los Angeles Times championed the film, praising De Felitta's "painstaking adaptation" of the source novel, and summarized the film as an "intense and engrossing entertainment that unexpectedly involves a crackling battle between psychiatry and parapsychology, with poor Hershey caught in the middle... Never has so much been demanded of Hershey, and she's never been better."

David Elliott of USA Today found Hershey and Silver's lead performances effective, but noted exploitation elements in the film and found it "crude," adding: "There's an almost valid film buried in this screamer."

Contemporary criticism of the film has been favorable: Andrew Dowler of the Toronto publication Now praised the lead performances, writing: "Hershey gives Carla a believable mix of hopelessness and grit, and Ron Silver strikes the right note as an over-assertive psychologist who may have more than a professional interest in the case. Director Sidney J. Furie keeps them in the foreground, but uses slightly off-kilter angles to make his very ordinary settings creepy and cramped." American film theorist Michael Atkinson lauded the film, writing: "There may not be, outside of David Cronenberg's wonder cabinet, a more nitro-powered horror-movie metaphor hell than that fueling this post-Exorcist remnant... It's like the movie is writing its own library of fiery feminist theory. It remains unnerving and savage, arguably the most eloquent movie ever made in Hollywood about the struggle of the sexual underclass."

TV Guide gave the film a middling review, noting that "a great performance by Barbara Hershey fails to save this poorly directed tale of the supernatural... ever-inept director Sidney J. Furie is ham-handed as usual, with the camera swooping all over the place between dull bouts of psychological and parapsychological mumbo-jumbo."

Director Martin Scorsese has also remarked his appreciation for the film, and ranked it the fourth-scariest horror film of all time, above Psycho and The Shining.

=== In other media ===
Avant-garde filmmaker Peter Tscherkassky used a print of this film for his 1999 short Outer Space.

=== Accolades ===
Award	Year	Category	Subject	Result	Ref.
Avoriaz Fantastic Film Festival Award	1983	Best Actress	Barbara Hershey	Won	
Saturn Award	1984	Best Music	Charles Bernstein	Nominated	

== Remake ==
In 2003, the film was unofficially remade and released in India as Hawa.

In April 2015, it was announced that James Wan and Roy Lee were producing a remake for 20th Century Fox through their Atomic Monster and Vertigo Entertainment banners, respectively. The film would be written by Chad Hayes and Carey W. Hayes. In a 2020 interview, Carey Hayes commented that the screenplay had been completed, but that the project's future was undetermined following The Walt Disney Company's acquisition of 20th Century Fox.

== See also ==
- List of ghost films
- Spectrophilia
- Poltergeist, the 1982 Tobe Hooper film similar in content

== Sources ==
- De Bruyn, Dirk Cornelis (2014). The Performance of Trauma in Moving Image Art. Cambridge, England: Cambridge Scholars Publishing. ISBN 978-1-443-86875-4.
- Doyle, Michael (July 2012). "The Demon's Plaything / Home Is Where the Hell Is". Rue Morgue. No. 124. pp. 16–22. ISSN 1481-1103.
- Kremer, Daniel (2015). "Cool Sounds from Hell: The Entity". Sidney J. Furie: Life and Films. Lexington, Kentucky: University Press of Kentucky. pp. 265–282. ISBN 978-0-813-16598-1.
- Meehan, Paul (2009). Cinema of the Psychic Realm: A Critical Survey. Jefferson, North Carolina: McFarland. ISBN 978-0-7864-5474-7.
- Meehan, Paul (2019). The Haunted House on Film: An Historical Analysis. Jefferson, North Carolina: McFarland. ISBN 978-1-476-67458-2.
- Parish, James Robert (1994). Ghosts and Angels in Hollywood Films: Plots, Critiques, Casts, and Credits for 264 Theatrical and Made-for-television Releases. Jefferson, North Carolina: McFarland. ISBN 978-0-899-50676-0.
- Solomon, Aubrey (2002). Twentieth Century Fox: A Corporate and Financial History. Lanham, Maryland: Scarecrow Press. ISBN 978-0-810-84244-1.
