= Audrey Rose (novel) =

1975 novel by Frank De Felitta

- First ed. cover
- Author: Frank De Felitta
- Language: English
- Genre: Horror
- Publisher: Putnam
- Publication date: 1975
- Publication place: United States
- Media type: Print
- Pages: 374 p.
- ISBN: 9780399116063
- OCLC: 3103790
- Followed by: For Love of Audrey Rose

Audrey Rose is a novel written by Frank De Felitta, published in 1975, about a couple confronted with the idea that their young daughter might be the reincarnation of another man's child. The book was inspired by an incident in which De Felitta's young son began displaying unusual talents and interests, leading an occultist to suggest to De Felitta that the child might be remembering a previous life. The book was followed by a 1982 sequel, For Love of Audrey Rose.

It was adapted into the 1977 film of the same name.

== Plot synopsis ==
Bill and Janice Templeton's peaceful lives are cast into chaos when a strange man begins fixating on their eleven-year-old daughter Ivy. This stalking seems to coincide with Ivy's horrible night terrors in which she beats at the windows and screams. One night while Ivy is in the middle of one of these episodes, the stranger contacts them directly and introduces himself as Elliot Hoover.

Hoover explains to the Templetons that he lost his wife and their three-year-old daughter, Audrey Rose, in a fiery car crash. To heal his mental anguish, he visited a clairvoyant who revealed that his daughter had been immediately reincarnated as another young girl born at the moment of Audrey Rose's death. Because of this immediate reincarnation, Audrey Rose's soul was not allowed the necessary time to reflect in the spirit world, causing her to be trapped forever at the moment of her horrific death. In an effort to rescue his daughter's soul, Hoover began to research births that coincided with his daughter's death, gradually determining that his daughter's soul now resides in Ivy Templeton.

The Templetons refuse to believe Hoover and order him to stay away from their daughter. However, Ivy's night terrors grow steadily worse. The Templetons are astonished when Hoover is able to calm Ivy by calling her Audrey Rose.

Hoover continues to intrude in the family's lives, going so far as to kidnap Ivy in an attempt to heal his daughter's tormented soul. Although Hoover soon returns Ivy voluntarily, Bill has Hoover arrested for kidnapping. While Hoover is in jail, Ivy nearly dies after walking into a bonfire, seemingly while in a trance. Bill suspects Hoover of brainwashing his daughter during the kidnapping, but Janice starts to believe that Ivy truly is the reincarnation of Audrey Rose. Bill dismisses his wife's beliefs, causing strain on their relationship.

During the kidnapping trial, Hoover continues to insist that his daughter's soul resides in Ivy. The newspapers begin to spin the trial as a supernatural child custody battle, and the resulting media circus disrupts Bill and Janice's lives, further threatening their marriage. A psychotherapist is brought forth to hypnotize Ivy before the jury. Ivy is taken into her past life by the hypnotist, where she suddenly begins reenacting Audrey Rose's violent death. While reliving Audrey Rose's last moments, Ivy dies of what is determined to be smoke inhalation, even though no smoke or fire is present. Devastated, the Templetons finally acknowledge that Hoover was telling the truth and have the charges against him dismissed.

Some years later, Janice writes a letter to Hoover to thank him for transporting Ivy's ashes to India. While Bill is still in denial, Janice has come to accept that Hoover was correct all along. She believes that both Ivy and Audrey Rose are now at peace and takes comfort in the thought that Ivy will one day be reborn. She closes with a quotation from the Bhagavad-Gita.
