= Audrey Rose (film) =

1977 film by Robert Wise

- Theatrical release poster
- Directed by: Robert Wise
- Screenplay by: Frank De Felitta
- Based on: Audrey Rose; 1975 novel by Frank De Felitta
- Produced by: Frank De Felitta; Joe Wizan
- Starring: Marsha Mason; Anthony Hopkins; John Beck
- Cinematography: Victor J. Kemper
- Edited by: Carl Kress
- Music by: Michael Small
- Distributed by: United Artists
- Release date: April 6, 1977
- Running time: 113 minutes
- Country: United States
- Language: English
- Budget: $4 million
- Box office: $2 million

Audrey Rose is a 1977 American psychological horror drama film directed by Robert Wise and starring Marsha Mason, Anthony Hopkins, and John Beck. Its plot follows a New York City couple who are sought out by a stranger who believes their 11-year-old daughter is a reincarnation of his deceased one. It is based on the 1975 novel of the same name by Frank De Felitta, who also adapted the screenplay.

== Plot ==
Bill and Janice Templeton live a privileged life in Manhattan's Upper West Side with their 11-year-old daughter, Ivy. They begin to notice a stranger following them in public places and grow alarmed when the man follows Janice and Ivy home one afternoon. The man reaches out to the couple by phone, revealing himself as Elliot Hoover, a widower who lost his wife and daughter, Audrey Rose, in a car accident in Pittsburgh. The couple agree to have dinner with Elliot, during which he explains that he believes Ivy is a reincarnation of Audrey, and that psychics confirmed his suspicions; he learned from them intimate knowledge of the couple's apartment and that Ivy was born only minutes after Audrey died.

Bill believes Elliot is extorting the family. He invites Elliot to their apartment, and arranges for his attorney friend, Russ, to listen covertly from upstairs. When Elliot speaks Audrey's name, Ivy enters a state of panic, which is only calmed by Elliot's presence. In this state, she bangs her hands against the cold window, and it leaves inexplicable burns. Elliot comforts her, after which she recognizes him as "Daddy" and falls asleep. Elliot insists that Ivy's burns are evidence of her reincarnation, as Audrey burned to death in the car accident. Bill grows enraged by Elliot and forces him out, punching him, but Janice and even Russ are sympathetic to the strange man's plea.

One night while Bill is working late, Ivy experiences another night terror, in which she thrashes around violently. Janice is surprised by Elliot's appearance at her door and allows him in to help calm Ivy. During Ivy's next episode, Elliot again arrives, and Bill attacks him. After a struggle, Elliot locks the couple out of their apartment and disappears with Ivy through a service exit. An attendant informs them that Elliot rented an apartment in the building. Police discover him and Ivy in the apartment and charge him with child abduction.

A trial ensues, during which Janice and Bill have Ivy sent to a Catholic boarding school in upstate New York to shield her from the public. Elliot attempts to persuade the jury that his actions were necessary to grant peace to Audrey's spirit. The trial becomes an international news story, with a Hindu holy man testifying about their religious belief in reincarnation. On the stand, Janice admits that she believes Elliot. The judge grants a recess in the trial, and Janice and Bill are informed that Ivy has injured herself at her school by crawling toward a fire pit during a Christmas celebration.

After Ivy is treated for burns, Janice remains in upstate New York in a hotel. In the middle of the night, Janice finds Ivy repeatedly greeting herself as Audrey Rose in the mirror. In a motion to complete Elliot's trial, Bill and Janice's attorney requests that Ivy be hypnotized as a means of proving she is not a reincarnation of Audrey. The hypnotist employs a past life regression hypnosis, which is observed in a hospital by the jury. Ivy revisits the traumatic car crash that took Audrey's life and reacts violently. She loses consciousness, and Elliot scrambles in to attempt to calm her but she dies in his arms.

Sometime later, Janice writes a letter to Elliot, thanking him for transporting Ivy's cremated remains to India, and expressing her hope that Bill will come to accept her and Elliot's belief that Ivy was a reincarnation of Audrey. A closing intertitle quotes the Bhagavad-Gita:

There is no end. For the soul there is never birth nor death. Nor, having once been, does it ever cease to be. It is unborn, eternal, ever-existing, undying and primeval...

== Cast ==
- Marsha Mason as Janice Templeton
- Anthony Hopkins as Elliot Hoover
- John Beck as Bill Templeton
- Susan Swift as Ivy Templeton / Audrey Rose
- Norman Lloyd as Dr. Steven Lipscomb
- John Hillerman as Prosecutor Scott Velie
- Ivy Jones as Mary Lou Sides
- Robert Walden as Brice Mack
- Philip Sterling as Judge Langley
- Stephen Pearlman as Russ Rothman
- Aly Wassil as Maharishi Gupta Pradesh
- Mary Jackson as Mother Veronica
- Elizabeth Farley as Carole Rothman
- Richard Lawson as Policeman
- Bill Beutel as Bill Beutel
- Pat Corley as Dr. Webster

== Production ==
=== Casting ===
Director Robert Wise began an extensive search to cast the title role, initially auditioning young actresses in major cities such as Los Angeles and New York. Susan Swift was eventually cast in the role after auditioning in Austin, Texas. The film marked her feature debut.

=== Filming ===
Principal photography of Audrey Rose began on July 26, 1976, on sound stages in Los Angeles and Culver City, California. Filming continued through November, when the production moved to New York City, where exterior sequences were shot on location. The film had a production budget of approximately $4 million.

== Release ==
=== Critical response ===
As of May 2023, the film has a score of 57% on Rotten Tomatoes based on 21 reviews.

Vincent Canby of The New York Times wrote: "The soul of the movie is that of The Exorcist instantly recycled." Gene Siskel of the Chicago Tribune gave the film three stars out of four and called the first hour "excellent" but the second half "pretty bad ... The picture falls apart as it turns into a dumb legal melodrama replete with cross-examination and a hypnotized key witness." Charles Champlin of the Los Angeles Times praised the "first-rate acting" but added "In a way, 'Audrey Rose' may go too far in denying the mystery and proclaiming the certainty of reincarnation. The handling denies the story of some of the spookiness of an exercise in style like Don't Look Now, and the literalness has a way of putting off those who might be willing to go along for the ride."

For Newsweek, Janet Maslin wrote that Audrey Rose lacked "not only any sign of intelligence, but also that other prerequisite of a good horror movie - fast pacing"; and Judith Crist in the Saturday Review wrote that the film "starts out as a titillating little thriller, but after 20 minutes, it bogs down in a series of minilectures on reincarnation that wipe out whatever dramatic potential the story might have had." Rex Reed wrote that the film "will finish off whatever segment of the populace is still breathing after The Exorcist and its progeny left most people maimed and kicking.... The actors appear to be mortified by the material. Anthony Hopkins fakes his way through it, John Beck ignores it completely, and Marsha Mason weeps and thrashes her way through it with so much tragic suffering she seems to be expecting a hatchet murderer to crash through the window at every jingle of the telephone. Robert Wise's direction milks what little suspense there is for laughs instead of either reality or terror."

Clyde Gilmour of the Toronto Star described the direction as "untypically sluggish in style" but said that it "may attract a lot of customers who are zealously interested in reincarnation." Martin Malina, who reviewed the film alongside similar films Demon Seed and Rabid in the same column of the Montreal Star, said that "the screenplay that De Felitta has fashioned from his own bestselling potboiler is thoroughly inept and the film's cast makes the worst of this trashy material".

More mixed was Richard Combs writing for The Monthly Film Bulletin: "Before the film collapses into [...] bathetic nonsense [...] it displays a dramatic rationale and figurative substance that makes it at least as diverting as Rosemary's Baby, and a cut above the special effects hocus-pocus of its nearer predecessors in the demonology genre." Paul Petlewski for Cinefantastique was measured in his assessment: "Although Audrey Rose is an honourable film, it isn't particularly memorable or even an important one [...] Its interest is partly historical the [Val] Lewton connection and partly aesthetic - the pleasure derived from watching a talented director attempt to transcend his silly material." Les Wedman of The Vancouver Sun wrote that "those convinced of the immortality of the soul and its freedom to live on in different bodies will find their beliefs substantiated through Audrey Rose. The scoffers will, despite overwhelming dramatic evidence presented in the movie, come away unconverted, perhaps wishing they could have been won over by this first-rate try."

Romola Costantino of the Sun-Herald in Sydney, Australia, wrote that "for a movie of this kind, the queasy suspense is on a far superior level to either The Exorcist or Carrie."

=== Home media ===
MGM Home Entertainment released the film on DVD on August 28, 2001. In October 2014, Twilight Time released a Blu-ray edition limited to 3,000 copies. In November 2022, it was re-released on Blu-ray by Arrow Films.

== Sources ==
- Nowell, Richard (2011). Blood Money: A History of the First Teen Slasher Film Cycle. London, England: Continuum. ISBN 978-1-441-12496-8.
