= All-New, All-Different Marvel =

2015–2017 branding for Marvel Comics' entire main line of comics

Characters on the All-New, All-Different Marvel poster

All-New, All-Different Marvel (ANADM) is a 2015–2019 branding for Marvel Comics' entire main line of comics. Taking place after the crossover storyline "Secret Wars", it details the new Marvel Universe, with nearly 60–65 titles relaunched with first issues, with a total of 76 issues. Marvel NOW! 2.0 and Marvel Legacy are concurrent with it.

== Publication history ==
It was announced in February 2015 by Marvel that following the "Secret Wars" storyline, a new universe would be established by combining the 616 Universe and the 1610 Ultimate Universe. Soon after, Marvel revealed a title called the All-New, All-Different Avengers for Free Comic Book Day, a preview of the new Marvel Universe that featured many "legacy heroes", a term used for new characters taking on the role of established heroes. The comic also featured a preview of Uncanny Inhumans.

In early June 2015, Marvel unveiled two photos depicting many of its iconic and lesser-known characters post-"Secret Wars". Among these were Gwen Stacy's Spider-Woman counterpart, X-23 as the new Wolverine, Old Man Logan, Phil Coulson, Vision, Spider-Woman, Doctor Strange (wielding an axe), Black Panther, Thing in a Guardians of the Galaxy uniform, Red Wolf, Miles Morales, Peter Parker, Ant-Man, Steve Rogers' elderly appearance, Kamala Khan, Doctor Spectrum, Rocket Raccoon, Star-Lord, Iron Man, Daredevil, Hyperion, Inferno, a Citizen V, and Medusa. Sam Wilson and Jane Foster remained in their adopted roles of Captain America and Thor, respectively. After this, the company began revealing titles on a bi-daily basis. The new Invincible Iron Man series had Iron Man learning about who his birth parents are after it was revealed that Howard Stark and Maria Stark had adopted him and that Arno Stark was their biological son.

Marvel unveiled most of its new titles in late June 2015, after a book detailing the titles was shipped out to retailers, which was officially released on July 1. Three more titles were announced at San Diego Comic-Con the following month, after which Marvel began sparsely revealing even more comics.

In May 2016, Marvel announced the return of Marvel NOW! (Marvel NOW! 2.0) following the conclusion of the "Civil War II" storyline. Marvel Executive Editor Tom Brevoort stated that the relaunch is timed to coincide with "Civil War II" as means to "refresh and revitalize" the titles explaining, "One of the things a big event story is judged on, rightly or wrongly, is what kind of an impact it has on the Marvel Universe in its aftermath. That just becomes a condition of these big event stories: what is it at the end that changes the landscape?"

ANADM was succeeded by Marvel Legacy, which in its turn was succeeded by Fresh Start, another line-wide relaunch by Marvel Comics in mid 2018.

== Titles involved ==
Title	Issue(s)	Creative Team	Citation(s) and comments
Former ongoing series
A-Force Vol. 2	#1–10	G. Willow Wilson (W), Jorge Molina (A)	
Agents of S.H.I.E.L.D.	#1–10	Marc Guggenheim (W), German Peralta (A)	
All-New Hawkeye Vol. 2	#1–6	Jeff Lemire (W), Ramon Perez (A)	
All-New Inhumans	#1–11	Charles Soule and James Asmus (W), Stefano Caselli (A)	
All-New X-Men Vol. 2	#1–19, Annual #1, #1.MU	Dennis Hopeless (W), Mark Bagley (A)	
All-New, All-Different Avengers	FCBD #1–15, Annual #1	Mark Waid (W), Mahmud Asrar and Adam Kubert (A)	
All-New Wolverine	#1–24, Annual #1	Tom Taylor (W), David Lopez (A)	Continues with #25 on Marvel Legacy.
Amazing Spider-Man Vol. 4	#1–32, 1.1–1.6, Annual #1	Dan Slott (W), Giuseppe Camuncoli (A)	Continues with #789 on Marvel Legacy.
Angela, Queen of Hel	#1–7	Marguerite Bennett (W), Kim Jacinto and Stephanie Hans (A)	
The Astonishing Ant-Man	#1–13	Nick Spencer (W), Ramon Rosanas (A)	
Black Knight Vol. 4	#1–5	Frank Tieri (W), Luca Pizzari (A)	
Black Panther Vol. 6	#1–6	Ta-Nehisi Coates (W), Brian Stelfreeze (A)	Continues with #7 on Marvel NOW! 2.0.
Black Widow Vol. 6	#1–6	Mark Waid (W), Chris Samnee (A)	Continues with #7 on Marvel NOW! 2.0.
All-New Blade	Cancelled	Logan Faerber (A)	
Captain America: Sam Wilson	#1–13	Nick Spencer (W), Daniel Acuña (A)	Continues with #14 on Marvel NOW! 2.0.
Captain America: Steve Rogers	FCBD, #1–6	Nick Spencer (W), Jesus Saiz (A)	Continues with #7 on Marvel NOW! 2.0.
Captain Marvel Vol. 9	#1–10	Tara Butters and Michele Fazekas (W), Kris Anka (A)	
Carnage Vol. 2	#1–16	Gerry Conway (W), Mike Perkins (A)	
Contest of Champions	#1–10	Al Ewing (W), Paco Medina (A)	
Daredevil Vol. 5	#1–14, Annual #1	Charles Soule (W), Ron Garney (A)	Continues with #15 on Marvel NOW! 2.0.
Deadpool Vol. 6	#1–20, 3.1, Annual #1	Gerry Duggan (W), Mike Hawthorne (A)	Continues with #21 on Marvel NOW! 2.0.
Deadpool & the Mercs for Money Vol. 2	#1–3	Cullen Bunn (W), Iban Coello (A)	Continues with #4 on Marvel NOW! 2.0.
Doctor Strange Vol. 4	#1–11, Annual #1	Jason Aaron (W), Chris Bachalo (A)	Continues with #12 on Marvel NOW! 2.0.
Drax	#1–11	CM Punk and Cullen Bunn (W), Scott Hepburn (A)	
Extraordinary X-Men	#1–20, Annual #1	Jeff Lemire (W), Humberto Ramos (A)	
Guardians of Infinity	#1–8	Dan Abnett (W), Carlo Barberi (A)	
Guardians of the Galaxy Vol. 4	#1–14	Brian Michael Bendis (W), Valerio Schitti (A)	Continues with #15 on Marvel NOW! 2.0.
Hercules Vol. 4	#1–6	Dan Abnett (W), Luke Ross (A)	
Howard the Duck Vol. 6	#1–11	Chip Zdarsky (W), Joe Quinones (A)	
Howling Commandos of S.H.I.E.L.D	#1–6	Frank Barbiere (W), Brent Schoonover (A)	
Hyperion	#1–6	Chuck Wendig (W), Nik Virella (A)	
Illuminati	#1–7	Josh Williamson (W), Shawn Crystal (A)	
International Iron Man	#1–7	Brian Michael Bendis (W), Alex Maleev (A)	
Invincible Iron Man Vol. 2	#1–14	Brian Michael Bendis (W), David Marquez (A)	
Karnak: The End of All Things	#1–6	Warren Ellis (W), Gerardo Zaffino (A)	
Mighty Thor Vol. 2	#1–14	Jason Aaron (W), Russell Dauterman (A)	Continues with #15 on Marvel NOW! 2.0.
Mockingbird	#1–8	Chelsea Cain (W), Kate Niemczyk (A)	
Moon Girl And Devil Dinosaur	#1–12	Amy Reeder and Brandon Montclare (W), Natacha Bustos (A)	Continues with #13 on Marvel NOW! 2.0.
Moon Knight Vol. 8	#1–9	Jeff Lemire (W), Greg Smallwood (A)	Continues with #10 on Marvel NOW! 2.0.
Ms. Marvel Vol. 4	#1–11	G. Willow Wilson (W), Takeshi Miyazawa and Adrian Alphona (A)	Continues with #12 on Marvel NOW! 2.0.
New Avengers Vol. 4	#1–18	Al Ewing (W), Gerardo Sandoval (A)	
Nighthawk Vol. 2	#1–6	David Walker (W), Brandon Schultz (A)	
Nova Vol. 6	#1–11	Sean Ryan (W), Cory Smith (A)	
Old Man Logan Vol. 2	#1–30	Jeff Lemire (W), Andrea Sorrentino (A)	Continues with #31 on Marvel Legacy.
Patsy Walker, A.K.A Hellcat!	#1–10	Kate Leth (W), Brittney Williams (A)	Continues with #11 on Marvel NOW! 2.0.
Power Man and Iron Fist Vol. 3	#1–9	David Walker (W), Sanford Greene (A)	Continues with #10 on Marvel NOW! 2.0.
The Punisher Vol. 10	#1–6, Annual #1	Becky Cloonan (W), Steve Dillon (A)	Continues with #7 on Marvel NOW! 2.0.
Red Wolf Vol. 2	#1–6	Nathan Edmondson (W), Dalibor Talajić (A)	
Rocket Raccoon & Groot	#1–10	Skottie Young (W), Felipe Andrade (A)	
Scarlet Witch Vol. 2	#1–15	James Robinson (W), rotating artists	
Silk Vol. 2	#1–13	Robbie Thompson (W), Stacey Lee (A)	Continues with #14 on Marvel NOW! 2.0.
Silver Surfer Vol. 8	#1–8	Dan Slott (W), Mike Allred (A)	Continues with #9 on Marvel NOW! 2.0.
Spider-Gwen Vol. 2	#1–15, Annual 1	Jason Latour (W), Robbi Rodriguez (A)	Continues with #16 on Marvel NOW! 2.0.
Spider-Man: Miles Morales Vol. 2	#1–11	Brian Michael Bendis (W), Sara Pichelli (A)	Continues with #12 on Marvel NOW! 2.0.
Spider-Man/Deadpool	#1–22, #1.MU	Joe Kelly (W), Ed McGuiness (A)	Continues with #23 on Marvel Legacy and the title becomes Spider-Man vs. Deadpool
Spider-Man 2099 Vol. 3	#1–25	Peter David (W), Will Sliney (A)	
Spider-Woman Vol. 6	#1–12	Dennis Hopeless (W), Javier Rodriguez (A)	Continues with #13 on Marvel NOW! 2.0.
Spidey	#1–12	Robbie Thompson (W), Nick Bradshaw (A)	
Squadron Supreme Vol. 4	#1–15	James Robinson (W), Leonard Kirk (A)	While #13 was supposed to appear on Marvel NOW! 2.0, it did not carry the "Marvel NOW!" logo, and the series was cancelled at #15.
Starbrand and Nightmask	#1–6	Greg Weisman (W), Dominike Stanton (A)	
Star-Lord Vol. 1	#1–8	Sam Humphries (W), Javier Garron (A)	
Thunderbolts Vol. 3	#1–6	Jim Zub (W), Jon Malin (A)	Continues with #7 on Marvel NOW! 2.0.
The Totally Awesome Hulk	#1–14	Greg Pak (W), Frank Cho (A)	Continues with #15 on Marvel NOW! 2.0.
Ultimates Vol. 4	#1–12	Al Ewing (W), Kenneth Rocafort (A)	
Uncanny Avengers Vol. 3	#1–14, Annual #1	Gerry Duggan (W), Ryan Stegman (A)	Continues with #15 on Marvel NOW! 2.0.
Uncanny Inhumans	#1–14, Annual #1	Charles Soule (W), Steve McNiven (A)	Continues with #15 on Marvel NOW! 2.0.
The Unbeatable Squirrel Girl Vol. 2	#1–15	Ryan North (W), Erica Henderson (A)	Continues with #16 on Marvel NOW! 2.0.
The Unbelievable Gwenpool	#1–6	Christopher Hastings (W), GuriHiru (A)	Continues with #7 on Marvel NOW! 2.0.
Uncanny X-Men Vol. 4	#1–19, Annual #1	Cullen Bunn (W), Greg Land (A)	
Venom: Space knight	#1–13	Robbie Thompson (W), Ariel Olivetti (A)	
The Vision Vol. 2	#1–12	Tom King (W), Gabriel Hernandez Walta (A)	
Web Warriors	#1–11	Mike Costa (W), David Bildeon (A)	
Weirdworld Vol. 2	#1–6	Sam Humphries (W), Mike del Mundo (A)	
X-Men '92 Vol. 2	#1–10	Chris Sims (W), Chad Bowers (W), Alti Firmansyah (A)	
Limited series
Daredevil/Punisher: Seventh Circle	#1–4	Charles Soule (W), Szymon Kudranski (A)	
Deadpool and the Mercs for Money	#1–5	Cullen Bunn (W), Salvador Espin (A)	
Deadpool v Gambit	#1–5	Ben Acker (W), Ben Blacker (W), Danilo Beyruth (A)	
Deadpool: Back in Black	#1–5	Cullen Bunn (W), Salvador Espin (A)	
Deadpool & Cable: Split Second	#1–3	Fabian Nicieza (W), Reilly Brown (W & A)	
Doctor Strange Punisher: Magic Bullets	#1–4	John Barber (W), Andrea Broccardo (A), Jason Muhr (A)	
Amazing Spider-Man & Silk: The Spider(fly) Effect	#1–4	Robbie Thompson (W), Todd Nauck (A)	
Vote Loki	#1–4	Christopher Hastings (W), Langdon Foss (A)	
X-Men: The Worst X-Man Ever	#1–5	Max Bemis (W), Michael Walsh (A)	
Events
Avengers: Standoff!
Avengers Standoff: Welcome to Pleasant Hill Vol. 1	#1	Nick Spencer (W), Mark Bagley (A)	
Avengers Standoff: Assault on Pleasant Hill Alpha	#1	Nick Spencer (W), Jesus Saiz (A)	
Avengers Standoff: Assault on Pleasant Hill Omega	#1	Nick Spencer (W), Daniel Acuna and Angel Unzueta (A)	
Agents of S.H.I.E.L.D.	#3–4	Marc Guggenheim (W), German Peralta (A)	
All-New, All-Different Avengers	#7–8	Mark Said (W), Adam Kubert (A)	
Captain America: Sam Wilson	#7–8	Nick Spencer (W), Daniel Acuna and Angel Unzueta (A)	
Howling Commandos of S.H.I.E.L.D.	#6	Frank Barbiere (W), Brent Schoonover (A)	
Illuminati	#6	Joshua Williamson (W), Mike Henderson (A)	
New Avengers Vol.4	#8–10	Al Ewing (W), Marcus To (A)	
Uncanny Avengers Vol.3	#7–8	Gerry Duggan (W), Ryan Stegman (A)	
Spider-Women
Spider-Women Alpha	#1	Robbie Thompson (W), Vanesa Del Rey (A)	
Spider-Women Omega	#1	Dennis Hopeless (W), Jason Latour (W), Robbie Thompson (W), Nico Leon (A)	
Silk Vol. 2	#7–8	Robbie Thompson (W), Tana Ford (A)	
Spider-Gwen Vol. 2	#7–8	Jason Latour (W), Bengal (A)	
Spider-Woman Vol. 6	#6–7	Dennis Hopeless (W), Joelle Jones (A)	
Civil War II
Civil War II	#FCBD 0–8	Brian Michael Bendis (W), David Marquez (A)	
The Accused	#1	Marc Guggenheim (W), Ramon Bachs (A), Garry Brown (A)	
Civil War II: Amazing Spider-Man	#1–4	Christos N. Gage (W), Travel Foreman (A)	
Civil War II: Choosing Sides	#1–6	Various (W), Declan Shalvey & Various (A)	
The Fallen	#1	Greg Pak (W), Mark Bagley (A)	
Civil War II: Gods of War	#1–4	Dan Abnett (W), Emilio Laiso (A)	
Civil War II: Kingpin	#1–4	Matthew Rosenberg (W), Ricardo Lopez Ortiz (A)	
Civil War II: The Oath	#1	Nick Spencer (W), Rod Reis (A)	
Civil War II: Ulysses	#1–3	Al Ewing (W), Jefte Palo (A)	
Civil War II: X-Men	#1–4	Cullen Bunn (W), Andrea Broccardo (A)	
A-Force Vol. 2	#8–10	Kelly Thompson (W), Paulo Siqueira (A)	
Agents of S.H.I.E.L.D.	#7–10	Marc Guggenheim (W), German Peralta (A)	
All-New All Different Avengers	#13–15	Mark Waid (W), Jeremy Whitley (W), Adam Kubert (A)	
All-New Wolverine	#8–12	Tom Taylor (W), Marcio Takara (A)	
Captain America: Sam Wilson	#10–13	Nick Spencer (W), Angel Unzueta (A)	
Captain America: Steve Rogers	#4–6	Nick Spencer (W), Jesus Saiz (A)	
Captain Marvel	#6–10	Tara Butters (W), Michele Fazekas (A)	
Deadpool	#14–18	Gerry Duggan (W), Mike Hawthorne (A)	
Guardians of the Galaxy	#11–13	Brian Michael Bendis (W), Valerio Schiti (A)	
International Iron Man	#4	Brian Michael Bendis (W), Alex Maleev (A)	
Invincible Iron Man	#6–14	Brian Michael Bendis (W), Mike Deodato Jr. (A)	
Mockingbird	#6–8	Chelsea Cain (W), Kate Niemczyk (A)	
Ms. Marvel	#7–11	G. Willow Wilson (W), Takeshi Miyazawa (A)	
New Avengers	#12–17	Al Ewing (W), Gerardo Sandoval (A)	
Nova	#8–9	Sean Ryan (W), R. B. Silva (A)	
Patsy Walker A.K.A. Hellcat!	#8	Kate Leth (W), Brittney Williams (A)	
Power Man and Iron Fist	#6–9	David Walker (W), Flaviano Armentaro (A)	
Rocket Raccoon and Groot	#8–10	Nick Kocher (W), Michael Walsh (A)	
Scarlet Witch	#9	James Robinson (W), Joëlle Jones (A)	
Spider-Man	#6–10	Brian Michael Bendis (W), Sara Pichelli (A)	
Spider-Man 2099	#13–16	Peter David (W), Will Sliney (A)	
Spider-Woman	#9-11	Dennis Hopeless (W), Javier Rodriguez (A)	
Squadron Supreme	#9–12	James Robinson (W), Leonard Kirk (A)	
Thunderbolts	#5	Jim Zub (W), Jon Malin (A)	
Totally Awesome Hulk	#7–12	Greg Pak (W), Alan Davis (A)	
Ultimates	#7–12	Al Ewing (W), Kenneth Rocafort (A)	
Uncanny Avengers	#13–14	Gerry Duggan (W), Ryan Stegman (A)	
Uncanny Inhumans	#11–14	Charles Soule (W), Carlos Pacheco (A)	
Venom: Space Knight	#11–12	Robbie Thompson (W), Gerardo Sandoval (A)	
Monsters Unleashed
Monsters Unleashed	#1–5	Cullen Bunn (W), Adam Kubert (A), Greg Land (A), Salvador Larroca (A), Steve McNiven (A), Leinil Francis Yu (A)	
All-New X-Men Vol. 2	#1.MU	Jeremy Whitley (W), Carlo Barberi (A)	
Avengers Vol. 7	#1.MU	Jim Zub (W), Sean Izaakse (A)	
Champions Vol. 2	#1.MU	Jeremy Whitley (W), Ro Stein (A)	
Doctor Strange Vol. 4	#1.MU	Chip Zdarsky (W), Julian Lopez (A)	
Guardians of the Galaxy Vol. 4	#1.MU	Chad Bowers (W), Chris Sims (W), David Baldeon (A)	
Spider-Man/Deadpool	#1.MU	Joshua Corin (W), Tigh Walker (A)	
Totally Awesome Hulk	#1.MU	Bryan Edward Hill (W), Leah Williams (W), Ty Templeton (A)	
Uncanny Inhumans	#1.MU	Paul Allor (W), Brian Level (A)	
Deadpool: Til Death Do Us
Deadpool Vol. 4	#28–29	Gerry Duggan (W), Salvador Espin (A)	
Deadpool & the Mercs for Money Vol. 2	#9–10	Christopher Hastings (W), Iban Coello (A)	
Spider-Man/Deadpool	#15–16	Joshua Corin (W), Scott Koblish (A)	
One-shots
All-New, All-Different Marvel Universe	#1		
All-New, All-Different Point One	#1		
Avengers	#0		
Deadpool: Last Days of Magic	#1		
Deadpool: Masacre	#1		
Doctor Strange: Last Days of Magic	#1		
FCBD 2015 All-New, All-Different Avengers	#1		
FCBD 2016 Captain America	#1		
Power Man and Iron Fist: Sweet Christmas Annual	#1		
Doctor Strange: Mystic Apprentice	#1	Will Corona Pilgrim (W), Andrea Di Vito (A)	

== Collected editions ==
Title	Page count	Material collected	Publication date	ISBN
A-Force Vol. 1: Hypertime TP	144	A-Force Vol. 2 #1-4, Avengers (1963) Vol. 1 #83, A-Force (2015) #1, material from Avengers Vol. 6 #0	July 6, 2016	978-0785196051
A-Force Vol. 2: Rage Against The Dying Of The Light TP	126	A-Force Vol. 2 #5-10	February 8, 2017	978-0785196068
All-New All Different Avengers Vol. 1: Magnificent Seven TP	168	All-New All Different Avengers #1-6, material from Free Comic Book Day 2015 Avengers #1	April 20, 2016	978-0785199670
All-New All Different Avengers Vol. 2: Family Business TP	144	All-New All Different Avengers #7-12	September 28, 2016	978-0785199687
All-New All Different Avengers Vol. 3: Civil War II TP	112	All-New All Different Avengers #13-15, Annual #1	February 8, 2017	978-1302902360
All-New Inhumans Vol. 1: Global Outreach TP	112	All-New Inhumans #1-4, material from All-New, All-Different Point One #1	May 18, 2016	978-0785196389
All-New Inhumans Vol. 2: Skyspears TP	160	All-New Inhumans #5-11	October 19, 2016	978-0785196396
All-New Wolverine Vol. 1: The Four Sisters TP	144	All-New Wolverine #1-6	May 24, 2016	978-0785196525
All-New Wolverine Vol. 2: Civil War II TP	144	All-New Wolverine #7-12	November 1, 2016	978-0785196532
All-New Wolverine Vol. 3: Enemy of the State II TP	136	All-New Wolverine #13-18	May 16, 2017	978-1302902902
All-New Wolverine Vol. 4: Immune TP	136	All-New Wolverine #19-24	December 12, 2017	978-1302909352
All-New Wolverine Vol. 5: Orphans of X TP	112	All-New Wolverine #25-29	February 21, 2018	978-1302905613
All-New X-Men: Inevitable Vol. 1: Ghost of Cyclops TP	136	All-New X-Men (2015) #1-6	May 17, 2016	978-0785196303
All-New X-Men: Inevitable Vol. 2: Apocalypse Wars TP	120	All-New X-Men (2015) #7-11	October 12, 2016	978-0785196310
All-New X-Men: Inevitable Vol. 3: Hell Hath So Much Fury TP	112	All-New X-Men (2015) #12-16	February 22, 2017	978-1302902919
All-New X-Men: Inevitable Vol. 4: IvX TP	128	All-New X-Men (2015) #17-19, Annual (2016) #1	August 23, 2017	978-1302902919
Amazing Spider-Man: Worldwide Vol. 1 TP	144	Amazing Spider-Man (2015) #1-5	April 6, 2016	978-0785199427
Amazing Spider-Man: Worldwide Vol. 2: Scorpio Rising TP	136	Amazing Spider-Man (2015) #6-11	July 6, 2016	978-0785199434
Amazing Spider-Man: Worldwide Vol. 3: Power Play TP	136	Amazing Spider-Man (2015) #12-15, material from Amazing Spider-Man Annual #19 and Amazing Spider-Man Vol. 4 #1	November 23, 2016	978-0785199441
Amazing Spider-Man: Worldwide Vol. 4 TP	112	Amazing Spider-Man (2015) #16-18, Annual #1; Free Comic Book Day 2016 (Captain America) #1 (B Story)	January 11, 2017	978-1302902377
Amazing Spider-Man: Worldwide Vol. 5 TP	144	Amazing Spider-Man (2015) #19-24	May 10, 2017	978-1302902384
Amazing Spider-Man: Worldwide Vol. 6 TP	160	Amazing Spider-Man (2015) #25-28	July 19, 2017	978-1302902933
Amazing Spider-Man: Worldwide Vol. 7 TP	160	Amazing Spider-Man (2015) #29-32, #789-791	January 24, 2018	978-1302902933
Angela: Queen of Hel - Journey to the Funderworld TP	160	Angela: Queen of Hel #1-7	June 29, 2016	978-1302900014
Avengers: Standoff! HC	416	Avengers Standoff: Welcome to Pleasant Hill #1, Avengers Standoff: Assault on Pleasant Hill Alpha #1, Avengers Standoff: Assault on Pleasant Hill Omega #1, Agents of S.H.I.E.L.D. #3-4, All-New, All Different Avengers #7-8, Captain America: Sam Wilson #7-8, Howling Commandos of S.H.I.E.L.D. #6, Illuminati #6, New Avengers Vol. 4 #8-10, Uncanny Avengers Vol. 3 #7-8,	June 29, 2016	978-1302901479
Black Knight: The Fall of Dane Whitman TP	128	Black Knight Vol. 4 #1–5	June 8, 2016	978-1302900315
Black Panther: A Nation Under Our Feet Book 1 TP	144	Black Panther (2016) #1-4, Fantastic Four (1961) Vol. 1 #52	August 31, 2016	978-1302900533
Black Panther: A Nation Under Our Feet Book 2 TP	144	Black Panther (2016) #5-8	January 11, 2017	978-1302900540
Black Panther: A Nation Under Our Feet Book 3 TP	144	Black Panther (2016) #9-12, material from New Avengers (2013) #18, 21, 24	April 12, 2017	978-1302901912
Black Widow Vol. 1: S.H.I.E.L.D.'s Most Wanted TP	136	Black Widow (2016) #1-6	October 26, 2016	978-0785199755
Black Widow Vol. 2: No More Secrets TP	136	Black Widow (2016) #7-12	April 26, 2017	978-0785199762
Captain America: Sam Wilson Vol. 1: Not My Captain America TP	136	Captain America: Sam Wilson (2015) #1-6	April 20, 2016	978-0785196402
Captain America: Sam Wilson Vol. 2: Standoff! TP	168	Captain America: Sam Wilson (2015) #7-8, Avengers Standoff: Assault on Pleasant Hill Alpha #1, Avengers Standoff: Assault on Pleasant Hill Omega #1	September 28, 2016	978-0785196419
Captain America: Sam Wilson Vol. 3: Civil War II TP	112	Captain America: Sam Wilson (2015) #9-13	January 11, 2017	978-1302903190
Captain America: Sam Wilson Vol. 4: #TakeBackTheShield TP	136	Captain America: Sam Wilson (2015) #14-18	April 19, 2017	978-1302903299
Captain America: Sam Wilson Vol. 5: End of the Line TP	112	Captain America: Sam Wilson (2015) #19-21, Avengers (1963) #326	August 9, 2017	978-1302906146
Captain America: Steve Rogers Vol. 1: Hail Hydra TP	168	Captain America: Steve Rogers (2016) #1-6, material from Free Comic Book Day 2016 Captain America #1	December 7, 2016	978-1302901127
Captain America: Steve Rogers Vol. 2: The Trial of Maria Hill TP	120	Captain America: Steve Rogers #7-11	April 12, 2017	978-1302901134
Captain America: Steve Rogers Vol. 3: Empire Building TP	152	Captain America: Steve Rogers (2016) #12-16, Civil War II: The Oath #1	August 2, 2017	978-1302906160
Captain Marvel Vol. 1: Rise of Alpha Flight TP	112	Captain Marvel (2016) #1-5	July 20, 2016	978-0785196426
Captain Marvel Vol. 2: Civil War II TP	120	Captain Marvel (2016) #6-10	February 1, 2017	978-0785196433
Carnage Vol. 1: The One That Got Away TP	120	Carnage (2015) #1-6, material from All-New, All-Different Point One #1	April 27, 2016	978-0785196341
Carnage Vol. 2: World Tour TP	112	Carnage (2015) #6-10	October 26, 2016	978-0785196358
Carnage Vol. 3: What Dwells Beneath TP	136	Carnage (2015) #11-16	April 26, 2017	978-1302902964
Champions Vol. 1: Change the World TP	136	Champions (2016) #1-5	May 3, 2017	978-1302906184
Champions Vol. 2: The Freelancer Lifestyle TP	136	Champions (2016) #6-11	December 13, 2017	978-1302906191
Civil War II: Amazing Spider-Man TP	120	Civil War II: Amazing Spider-Man #1-4, Amazing Spider-Man (2014) #7-8	November 2, 2016	978-1302902506
Civil War II: Choosing Sides TP	152	Civil War II: Choosing Sides #1-6	November 9, 2016	978-1302902513
Civil War II: Gods of War TP	112	Civil War II: Gods of War #1-4, Journey into Mystery Annual (1965) #1	November 9, 2016	978-1302900342
Civil War II: Kingpin TP	120	Civil War II: Kingpin #1-4, Amazing Spider-Man (1963) #51	November 16, 2016	978-1302902537
Civil War II: X-Men TP	112	Civil War II: X-Men #1-4, Amazing Adventures (1970) #9	November 16, 2016	978-1302902544
Contest of Champions Vol. 1: Battleworld TP	160	Contest of Champions #1-6, material from All-New, All-Different Point One #1	April 20, 2016	978-0785199960
Contest of Champions Vol. 2: Final Fight TP	128	Contest of Champions #7-10, Punisher (1987) #64	November 23, 2016	978-0785199977
Daredevil/Punisher: Seventh Circle TP	128	Daredevil/Punisher: Seventh Circle #1-4	October 19, 2016	978-1302902322
Daredevil: Back in Black Vol. 1: Chinatown TP	120	Daredevil (2015) #1-5, material from All-New, All-Different Point One #1	May 11, 2016	978-0785196440
Daredevil: Back in Black Vol. 2: Supersonic TP	120	Daredevil (2015) #6-9, Daredevil Annual #1	September 14, 2016	978-0785196457
Daredevil: Back in Black Vol. 3: Dark Art TP	112	Daredevil (2015) #10-14	February 22, 2017	978-1302902971
Daredevil: Back in Black Vol. 4: Identity TP	136	Daredevil (2015) #15-20	July 19, 2017	978-1302905620
Daredevil: Back in Black Vol. 5: Supreme TP	112	Daredevil (2015) #21-25	November 29, 2017	978-1302905637
Deadpool V Gambit: The "V" is for "Vs." TP	112	Deadpool V Gambit #1-5	November 9, 2016	978-1302901790
Deadpool: World's Greatest Vol. 1: Millionaire With A Mouth TP	120	Deadpool (2015) #1-5	April 20, 2016	978-0785196174
Deadpool: World's Greatest Vol. 2: End of an Error TP	136	Deadpool (2015) #6-7 and #3.1: Tres Punto Uno	June 8, 2016	978-0785196181
Deadpool: World's Greatest Vol. 3: Deadpool Vs. Sabretooth TP	112	Deadpool (2015) #8-12	August 24, 2016	978-0785196198
Deadpool: World's Greatest Vol. 4: Temporary Insanitation TP	112	Deadpool (2015) #13 and Deadpool: Last Days of Magic #1	October 26, 2016	978-1302900915
Deadpool: World's Greatest Vol. 5: Civil War II TP	136	Deadpool (2015) #14-19	December 21, 2016	978-1302901486
Deadpool: World's Greatest Vol. 6: Patience: Zero TP	152	Deadpool (2015) #20, #21 (A Story) and #22-25	April 26, 2017	978-1302902438
Deadpool: World's Greatest Vol. 7: Deadpool Does Shakespeare TP	112	Deadpool (2015) #26-27 and material from #21	May 24, 2017	978-1302905422
Deadpool: World's Greatest Vol. 8: 'Til Death Do Us... TP	136	Deadpool (2015) #28-29, Deadpool & The Mercs For Money #9-10, Spiderman/Deadpool #15-16	August 23, 2017	978-1302905439
Deadpool: World's Greatest Vol. 9: Deadpool in Space TP	112	Deadpool (2015) #30, Deadpool Secret Comic Variants	September 13, 2017	978-1302907600
Deadpool: World's Greatest Vol. 10: Secret Empire TP	136	Deadpool (2015) #31-36	November 1, 2017	978-1302907617
Death of X TP	136	Death of X #1-4	March 1, 2017	978-1302903374
Doctor Strange Vol. 1: The Way of the Weird HC	136	Doctor Strange (2015) #1-5	April 27, 2016	978-0785195160
Doctor Strange Vol. 2: The Last Days of Magic HC	168	Doctor Strange (2015) #6-10, Doctor Strange: The Last Days of Magic #1	October 5, 2016	978-0785195177
Doctor Strange Vol. 3: Blood in the Aether HC	136	Doctor Strange (2015) #11-16	February 22, 2017	978-1302902995
Doctor Strange Vol. 4: Mr. Misery HC	136	Doctor Strange (2015) #17-20, Annual #1	September 20, 2017	978-1302905866
Doctor Strange Vol. 5: Secret Empire TP	136	Doctor Strange (2015) #21-26	January 10, 2018	978-1302905897
Drax Vol. 1: The Galaxy's Best Detective TP	112	Drax (2015) #1-5	May 25, 2016	978-0785196624
Drax Vol. 2: The Children's Crusade TP	136	Drax (2015) #6-11	November 23, 2016	978-0785196631
Extraordinary X-Men Vol. 1: X-Haven TP	120	Extraordinary X-Men (2015) #1-5	April 27, 2016	978-0785199342
Extraordinary X-Men Vol. 2: Apocalypse Wars TP	168	Extraordinary X-Men (2015) #6-12	October 12, 2016	978-0785199359
Extraordinary X-Men Vol. 3: Kingdoms Fall TP	128	Extraordinary X-Men (2015) #13-16, Annual	February 15, 2017	978-0785199366
Extraordinary X-Men Vol. 4: IVX TP	112	Extraordinary X-Men (2015) #17-20, X-Men Prime (2017) #1	July 26, 2017	978-0785199373
Guardians of the Galaxy: Guardians of Infinity TP	136	Guardians of Infinity #1-8 (A Stories)	August 10, 2016	978-0785195870
Guardians of the Galaxy: New Guard Vol. 1: Emperor Quill HC	112	Guardians of the Galaxy (2015) #1-5	April 13, 2016	978-0785195184
Guardians of the Galaxy: New Guard Vol. 2: New Guard HC	136	Guardians of the Galaxy (2015) #6-10	November 23, 2016	978-0785195191
Guardians of the Galaxy: New Guard Vol. 3: Civil War II HC	136	Guardians of the Galaxy (2015) #11-14, Free Comic Book Day 2016 (Civil War II) 1 (A story)	February 15, 2017	978-1302903015
Guardians of the Galaxy: New Guard Vol. 4: Grounded HC	136	Guardians of the Galaxy (2015) #15-19	June 21, 2017	978-1302906696
Guardians of the Galaxy: Tales of the Cosmos TP	136	Guardians of Infinity #1-8 (B Stories)	August 10, 2016	978-0785195887
Hawkeye Vol. 6: Hawkeyes TP	136	All-New Hawkeye (2015) #1-6	June 15, 2016	978-0785199465
Hercules: Still Going Strong TP	136	Hercules (2015) #1-6	June 8, 2016	978-1302900335
Howard the Duck Vol. 1: Duck Hunt TP	160	Howard the Duck (2015) #1-6, The Unbeatable Squirrel Girl (2015) #6	May 18, 2016	978-0785199380
Howard the Duck Vol. 2: Good Night, and Good Duck TP	112	Howard the Duck (2015) #7-11	November 16, 2016	978-0785199397
Howling Commandos of S.H.I.E.L.D: Monster Squad TP	160	Howling Commandos of S.H.I.E.L.D. (2015) #1-6, material from S.H.I.E.L.D. #9	May 25, 2016	978-0785196464
Hyperion: Daddy Issues TP	136	Hyperion (2016) #1-6	October 26, 2016	978-1302900809
Illuminati: Life of Crime TP	160	Illuminati (2015) #1-7	June 29, 2016	978-0785199984
Invincible Iron Man Vol. 1: Reboot HC	136	Invincible Iron Man (2015) #1-5	April 6, 2016	978-0785195207
Invincible Iron Man Vol. 2: The War Machines HC	136	Invincible Iron Man (2015) #6-11	August 31, 2016	978-0785195214
Invincible Iron Man Vol. 3: Civil War II HC	144	Invincible Iron Man (2015) #12-14, Mighty Avengers (2007) #9-11	February 8, 2017	978-1302903206
International Iron Man Vol. 1 HC	160	International Iron Man #1-7	November 8, 2016	978-1302901493
Mighty Thor Vol. 1: Thunder in Her Veins HC	136	Mighty Thor Vol. 2 #1-5	June 7, 2016	978-0785195221
Mighty Thor Vol. 2: Lords of Midgard HC	160	Mighty Thor Vol. 2 #6-12	December 10, 2016	978-0785195238
Mighty Thor Vol. 3: Asgard/Shi'ar War HC	160	Mighty Thor Vol. 2 #13-19	August 1, 2017	978-1302903084
Mockingbird Vol. 1: I Can Explain TP	136	Mockingbird: S.H.I.E.L.D. 50th Anniversary #1, Mockingbird #1-5	November 8, 2016	978-1302901226
Moon Girl and Devil Dinosaur Vol. 1: BFF TP	136	Moon Girl and Devil Dinosaur #1-6	July 5, 2016	978-1302900052
Moon Girl and Devil Dinosaur Vol. 2: Cosmic Cooties TP	136	Moon Girl and Devil Dinosaur #7-12	January 10, 2017	978-1302902087
Moon Girl and Devil Dinosaur Vol. 3: The Smartest There Is TP	136	Moon Girl and Devil Dinosaur #13-18	July 11, 2017	978-1302905347
Moon Knight Vol. 1: Lunatic TP	120	Moon Knight Vol. 6 #1-5	December 13, 2016	978-0785199533
Ms. Marvel Vol. 5: Super Famous TP	144	Ms. Marvel Vol. 4 #1-6	July 12, 2016	978-0785196112
New Avengers: AIM Vol. 1: Everything is New TP	144	New Avengers Vol. 4 #1-6, material from Avengers Vol. 6 #0	May 10, 2016	978-0785196488
New Avengers: AIM Vol. 2: Standoff! TP	176	New Avengers Vol. 4 #7-11	August 16, 2016	978-0785196495
New Avengers: AIM Vol. 3: Civil War II TP	160	New Avengers Vol. 4 #12-18	December 6, 2016	978-1302902353
Nighthawk: Hate Makes Hate TP	136	Nighthawk Vol. 2 #1-6	January 10, 2017	978-1302901622
Nova: Vol. 1: Burn Out TP	136	Nova Vol. 6 #1-6	June 14, 2016	978-0785196501
Power Man and Iron Fist Vol. 1: The Boys are Back in Town TP	112	Power Man and Iron Fist Vol. 3 #1-5	October 11, 2016	978-1302901141
Scarlet Witch Vol. 1: Witches' Road TP	112	Scarlet Witch Vol. 2 #1-5	July 19, 2016	978-0785196822
Scarlet Witch Vol. 2: World of Witchcraft TP	112	Scarlet Witch Vol. 2 #6-10	January 31, 2017	978-0785196839
Silk Vol. 1: Sinister TP	144	Silk Vol. 2 #1-6, material from Amazing Spider-Man Vol. 4 #1	June 7, 2016	978-0785199571
Silk Vol. 2: The Negative TP	112	Silk Vol. 2 #9-13	December 21, 2016	978-0785199588
Silver Surfer Vol. 4: Citizen of Earth TP	144	Silver Surfer Vol. 8 #1-6	October 18, 2016	978-0785199694
Silver Surfer Vol. 5: A Power Greater Than Cosmic TP	176	Silver Surfer Vol. 8 #7-14	December 12, 2017	978-0785199700
Spider-Gwen Vol. 1: Greater Power TP	144	Spider-Gwen Vol. 2 #1-6	May 24, 2016	978-0785199595
Spider-Man 2099 Vol. 3: Smack to the Future TP	120	Spider-Man 2099 Vol. 3 #1-5, material from Amazing Spider-Man Vol. 4 #1	May 10, 2016	978-0785199632
Spider-Man/Deadpool Vol. 1: Isn't it Bromantic TP	136	Spider-Man/Deadpool #1-5, #8	September 13, 2016	978-0785197867
Spider-Man: Miles Morales Vol. 1 TP	112	Spider-Man Vol. 2 #1-5	September 20, 2016	978-0785199618
Spider-Man: Miles Morales Vol. 2 TP	112	Spider-Man Vol. 2 #6-10	March 14, 2017	978-0785199625
Spider-Woman: Shifting Gears Vol 1: Baby Talk TP	120	Spider-Woman Vol. 6 #1-5, material from Amazing Spider-Man Vol. 4 #1	June 14, 2016	978-0785196228
Spider-Women TP	200	Spider-Women Alpha #1, Spider-Women Omega #1, Silk Vol. 2 #7-8, Spider-Gwen Vol. 2 #7-8, Spider-Woman Vol. 6 #6-7	July 26, 2016	978-1302900939
Squadron Supreme Vol. 1: By Any Means Necessary! TP	128	Squadron Supreme #1-5, material from Avengers Vol. 6 #0	June 28, 2016	978-0785199717
Squadron Supreme Vol. 2: Civil War II TP	112	Squadron Supreme #6-9	November 29, 2016	978-0785199724
The Astonishing Ant-Man Vol. 1: Everybody loves Team-Ups TP	144	Astonishing Ant-Man Vol. 1 #1-4, Ant-Man: Last Days #1, Ant-Man Annual Vol. 1 #1	May 10, 2016	978-0785199489
The Astonishing Ant-Man Vol. 2: Small-Time Criminal TP	112	Astonishing Ant-Man #5-9	October 11, 2016	978-0785199496
The Astonishing Ant-Man Vol. 3: The Trial of Ant-Man TP	120	Astonishing Ant-Man #10-13	April 11, 2017	978-0785199526
The Punisher Vol. 1: On the Road TP	136	Punisher Vol. 10 #1-6	January 3, 2017	978-1302900472
The Unbeatable Squirrel Girl: Beats Up the Marvel Universe HC	120	The Unbeatable Squirrel Girl Beats Up the Marvel Universe	October 11, 2016	978-1302903039
The Unbeatable Squirrel Girl Vol. 3: Squirrel, You Really Got Me Now TP	168	The Unbeatable Squirrel Girl Vol.3 #1-6, Howard the Duck Vol. 6 #6	June 4, 2016	978-0785196266
The Unbeatable Squirrel Girl Vol. 4: I Kissed a Squirrel and I Liked It TP	120	The Unbeatable Squirrel Girl Vol. 2 #7-11	December 6, 2016	978-0785196273
The Unbeatable Squirrel Girl Vol. 5: Like I'm the Only Squirrel in the World TP	128	The Unbeatable Squirrel Girl Vol. 2 #12-16	April 4, 2017	978-1302903282
The Unbelievable Gwenpool Vol. 1: Believe It TP	152	The Unbelievable Gwenpool #0-4	November 29, 2016	978-1302901769
The Unbelievable Gwenpool Vol. 2: Head of M.O.D.O.K. TP	136	The Unbelievable Gwenpool #5-10	March 28, 2017	978-1302901776
The Unbelievable Gwenpool Vol. 3: Totally in Continuity TP	160	The Unbelievable Gwenpool #11-15	August 29, 2017	978-1302905477
The Unworthy Thor TP	112	The Unworthy Thor (2016 - 2017) #1-5	June 6, 2017	978-1302906672
The Vision Vol. 1: Little Worse Than A Man TP	136	The Vision Vol. 3 #1-6	July 12, 2016	978-0785196570
The Vision Vol. 2: Little Better Than a Beast TP	136	The Vision Vol. 3 #7-12	December 13, 2016	978-0785196587
Thunderbolts Vol. 1: There Is No High Road TP	136	Thunderbolts Vol. 4 #1-5	January 10, 2017	978-0785196686
Ultimates: Omniversal Vol. 1: Start with the Impossible TP	144	Ultimates Vol. 4 #1-6, material from Avengers Vol. 6 #0	July 19, 2016	978-0785196709
Ultimates: Omniversal Vol. 2: Civil War II TP	136	Ultimates Vol. 4 #7-12	December 13, 2016	978-0785196716
Uncanny Avengers: Unity Vol. 1: Lost Future TP	152	Uncanny Avengers Vol. 3 #1-6, material from Avengers Vol. 6 #0	April 26, 2016	978-0785196150
Uncanny Avengers: Unity Vol. 2: The Man Who Fell to Earth TP	136	Uncanny Avengers Vol. 3 #7-12	October 4, 2016	978-0785196167
Uncanny Inhumans Vol. 1: Time Crush TP	144	Uncanny Inhumans #0-4, material from Free Comic Book Day 2015 Avengers #1	April 12, 2016	978-0785197065
Uncanny Inhumans Vol. 2: The Quiet Room TP	136	Uncanny Inhumans #5-10	August 16, 2016	978-0785197072
Uncanny Inhumans Vol. 3: Civil War II TP	112	Uncanny Inhumans #11-13	December 27, 2016	978-0785199915
Uncanny X-Men: Superior Vol. 1: Survival of the Fittest TP	112	Uncanny X-Men Vol. 4 #1-5	July 12, 2016	978-0785196075
Uncanny X-Men: Superior Vol. 2: Apocalypse Wars TP	120	Uncanny X-Men Vol. 4 #6-10	November 29, 2016	978-0785196082
Venom: Space Knight Vol. 1: Agent of the Cosmos TP	136	Venom: Space Knight #1-6	July 12, 2016	978-0785196549
Venom: Space Knight Vol. 2: Enemies And Allies TP	160	Venom: Space Knight #7-13	December 13, 2016	978-0785196556
Vote Loki TP	120	Vote Loki #1-4, Material from Journey into Mystery #85 and Avengers (1963) #300	October 18, 2016	978-1302902629
Wolverine: Old Man Logan Vol. 1: Berzerker TP	128	Old Man Logan Vol. 2 #1-4, Wolverine: Old Man Logan Giant-Size	July 26, 2016	978-0785196204
Wolverine: Old Man Logan Vol. 2: Bordertown TP	112	Old Man Logan Vol. 2 #5-8, Uncanny X-Men #205	October 25, 2016	978-0785196211
Wolverine: Old Man Logan Vol. 3: The Last Ronin TP	112	Old Man Logan Vol. 2 #9-13	January 31, 2017	978-1302903145
Wolverine: Old Man Logan Vol. 4: Old Monsters TP	112	Old Man Logan Vol. 2 #14-19	June 13, 2017	978-1302905736
X-Men '92 Vol. 1: The World is a Vampire TP	112	X-Men '92 Vol. 2 #1-5	November 8, 2016	978-1302900496
X-Men '92 Vol. 2: Lilapalooza TP	120	X-Men '92 Vol. 2 #6-10	May 2, 2017	978-1302900502
X-Men: Apocalypse Wars HC	336	All-New X-Men Vol. 2 #9-11, Extraordinary X-Men #8-12, Uncanny X-Men Vol. 4 #6-10	October 18, 2016	978-1302902452
X-Men: The Worst X-Man Ever TP	112	X-Men: The Worst X-Man Ever #1-5	September 6, 2016	978-0785193548
