= S.H.I.E.L.D. (disambiguation) =

S.H.I.E.L.D. is a fictional spy agency featured in Marvel comics.

S.H.I.E.L.D. may also refer to:

- S.H.I.E.L.D. (comic book), a comic book title by Marvel Comics
  - S.H.I.E.L.D. (2010 series), first series of the title
  - S.H.I.E.L.D. (2014 series), second series of the title
- S.H.I.E.L.D. (Marvel Cinematic Universe), the Marvel Cinematic Universe organization based on the Marvel Comics counterpart
- Joe Higgins, a version of the Shield (Archie Comics), uses the initials S.H.I.E.L.D. as his secret identity

== See also ==
- Agents of S.H.I.E.L.D.
  - Agents of S.H.I.E.L.D. (comic book)
- Shield (disambiguation)
