= Daniel Knauf =

American writer

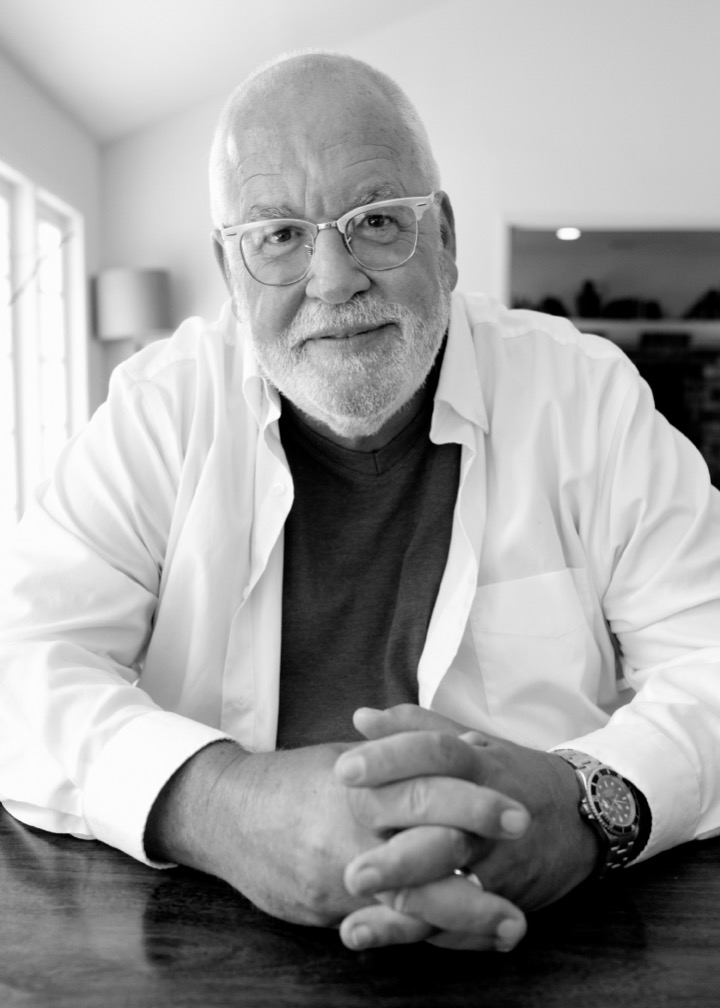
- Portrait of Daniel Knauf, 2023
- Born: United States
- Occupations: Screenwriter; television producer

Daniel Knauf, sometimes credited under the pseudonyms Wilfred Schmidt and Chris Neal, is an American television screenwriter and producer, as well as comic book writer, best known for his creation of the 2003 HBO series Carnivàle.

== Early life ==
Born and raised in Los Angeles, Knauf attended several colleges in Southern California studying fine art, and later graduated from the California State University, Los Angeles with a bachelor's degree in English in 1982. He began work as an employee benefits consultant and later a health insurance broker, writing once he was able to support himself and his family financially.

=== Origins of Carnivàle ===
Hoping to become a screenwriter, Knauf's first draft of Carnivàle, written in 1992, was 180 pages long and twice the length of the average feature film. Convinced the screenplay could not work as either a standard television series or a film, he put it aside, planning to one day adapt it into a novel. Carnivàle evolved as a result of Knauf's childhood fascination with carnivals and his interest in "freaks", due in part to the childhood polio that confined his father to a wheelchair, which Knauf felt his father was defined by. After meeting with a number of television writers at a Writers Guild of America retreat in the mid-90s, he started to think that his screenplay might work as a television piece. He took the first act and reworked it as a television pilot, but shelved the script again when he could not get the project produced.

== Career ==
Knauf went on to write the 1994 HBO-produced television movie Blind Justice, and, during a low-point in his screenwriting career, created his own website, posting his resume and Carnivàle's first act online. He created the 2001 television pilot Honey Vicarro and was a writer and consulting producer for the television series Wolf Lake. He was also writer and director on the 2002 film Dark Descent (his sole directing credit) before a television production scout brought Carnivàle to television producers Scott Winant and Howard Klein, who brought it to HBO where the series ended up being produced, twelve years after Knauf had first drafted the script.

Since Carnivàle was cancelled in 2005, Knauf has moved on to write for Supernatural and Standoff, also serving as a co-executive producer on Standoff. He worked as a writer for the Christian Slater drama My Own Worst Enemy in 2008.

From 2006 to 2008, he and his son Charles Knauf wrote issues #7–18 and #21–28 of Invincible Iron Man Vol.1 (later retitled Iron Man: Director of S.H.I.E.L.D.) for Marvel Comics. In 2008 they wrote a nine-issue The Eternals series.

In July 2008, he and Charles had completed and submitted a four-hour TV-movie script for Syfy. It was ordered as a four-hour miniseries (in two parts), meant as a backdoor pilot for the network. Produced by Muse Entertainment and RHI Entertainment, with Paolo Barzman directing. Ultimately the network did not option it as a series.

He was a consulting producer for the latter part of the first season of historical action drama Spartacus: Blood and Sand. Knauf wrote two episodes for the first season. Knauf co-wrote with Andrea Berloff and Caleb Pinkett the script for a mystery thriller, The Legend of Cain, but it has not been produced.

Knauf was the writer and showrunner of the short-lived NBC series Dracula, before joining the staff of The Blacklist with the beginning of season two. In 2020, he created the Nickelodeon series The Astronauts.

== Filmography ==
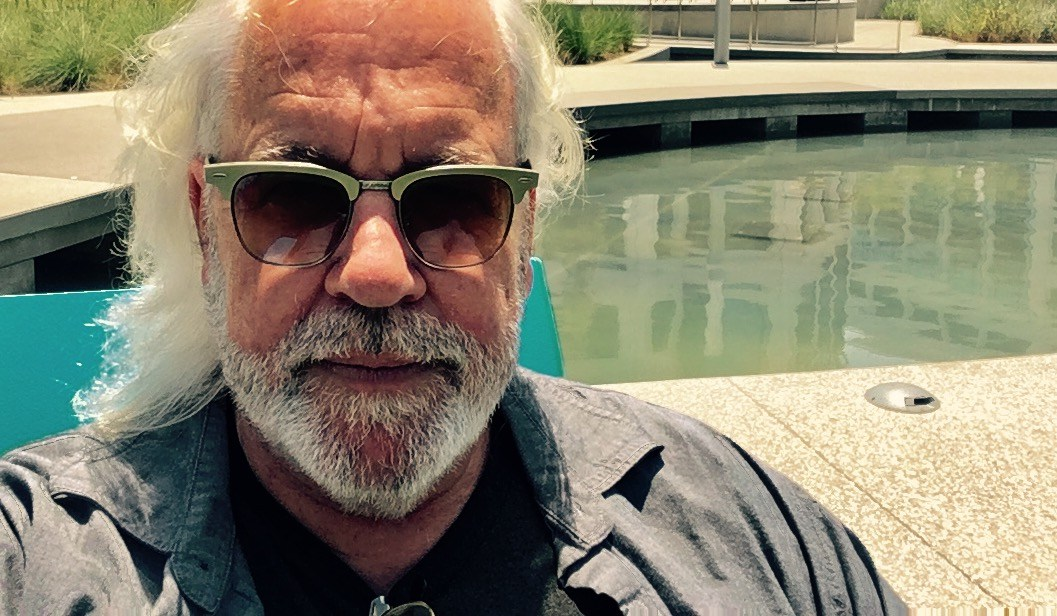
Daniel Knauf in 2016

=== Films ===
Year	Title	Credit	Notes
2012	Bxx: Haunted	Writer & executive producer	
2002	Dark Descent	Writer & director	as Wilfred Schmidt

=== Television ===
Year	Title	Credit	Notes
2020–2021	The Astronauts	Creator, writer & executive producer	9 episodes
2014–2017	The Blacklist	Writer & co-executive/executive producer	59 episodes
2013–2014	Dracula	Writer & executive producer	
2010	Spartacus: Blood and Sand	Writer & consulting producer	6 episodes
2009	The Phantom	Writer	2 episodes
2008	My Own Worst Enemy	Writer & co-executive producer	6 episodes
2008	Fear Itself	Writer	Family Man (#1.3)
2006–2007	Standoff	Writer, Consulting Producer & co-executive producer	11 episodes
2006	Supernatural	Writer	Something Wicked (#1.18)
2003–2005	Carnivàle	Creator, writer & executive producer	24 episodes
2001–2002	Wolf Lake	Writer & consulting producer	7 episodes
2001	Honey Vicarro	Writer & executive producer	TV movie
1994	Blind Justice	Writer	TV movie

Preceded by Warren Ellis	Iron Man writer 2006–present (with Charles Knauf)	Succeeded by Matt Fraction
