= Wonder (Palacio novel) =

R. J. Palacio novel

- Front cover, illustrated by Tad Carpenter
- Author: R. J. Palacio
- Cover artist: Tad Carpenter
- Subject: Prejudice; Self-acceptance; Middle school; Friendship; Bullying
- Genre: Children's novel
- Publisher: Alfred A. Knopf
- Publication date: 14 February 2012
- Pages: 310
- Awards: Maine Student Book Award; Vermont's Dorothy Canfield Fisher Children's Book Award; Mark Twain Award; Hawaii's Nene Award; Junior Young Reader's Choice Award
- ISBN: 0375869026
- OCLC: 726819876

Wonder is a contemporary children's novel written by R. J. Palacio and published on 14 February 2012. It centers on August "Auggie" Pullman, a boy with significant facial differences who enters mainstream school for the first time. Palacio drew inspiration for the story both from Natalie Merchant's song "Wonder" and from an experience where her son reacted with distress upon seeing a girl with facial deformities.

Several spin-offs have been published, including 365 Days of Wonder: Mr. Browne's Book of Precepts, We're All Wonders, Auggie and Me, and White Bird. A film adaptation was released in 2017, and a spin-off sequel film (adapting White Bird) followed in 2024.

== Plot ==
August "Auggie" Pullman is a 10-year-old boy living in North Riverside Heights in Upper Manhattan. He has Treacher Collins syndrome, which has disfigured his face and required many surgeries and special care. Due to his condition, August has been homeschooled by his mother for several years; however, wanting him to experience the world, his parents enroll him in Beecher Prep, a private school, for the start of fifth grade. August has an older sister, Olivia "Via" Pullman, who is entering her first year of high school.

Before the start of the school year, August's mother takes him to meet the principal, Mr. Tushman, who has asked three other students—Jack Will, Charlotte, and Julian Albans—to take him on a tour of the school. August is treated unkindly by Julian, who acts respectfully in front of adults. On his first day of school, August tries to avoid drawing attention to himself, but is bullied by Julian and his friends. August is approached and befriended at lunch by a classmate named Summer, and is paired in most of his classes with Jack, whom he also considers a friend.

On Halloween, August, dressed as Bleeding Scream, overhears Jack, who was expecting August to dress up as Boba Fett, joining in with Julian and his friends in making fun of August. Devastated, August stays home for several days, decides to never go back to school again, and isolates himself from his family, frustrating Via, who resents August for the priority he receives over her from their parents. Returning to school, August ignores Jack and confides in Summer about the incident with Jack. Jack presses Summer about August being upset, who hints at the cause. When Jack realizes this, he is ashamed and re-commits to his friendship with August.

This draws Julian's ire, and when Jack is partnered with August for a science fair project, Julian insists on switching partners, which Jack refuses, and Julian gets angry with Jack, saying that they could have been partners and calls August a "freak", leading to Jack punching Julian in the mouth and getting suspended until the end of winter break.

Jack also reconciles with August, but is ostracized from his popular classmates, as Julian's influence divides the students into factions over the conflict. Julian's mother writes to Tushman to voice her concerns over August attending the school, citing that his appearance may be too much of a burden for the other students to handle.

Via confides to her mother that she does not want August to attend her school play, as she has enjoyed the fresh start her new school has given her, free of the burden of being associated with August and his condition. August overhears and angrily sulks in his room, hoping his mother will come and comfort him, but Via comes in instead to tell him that their dog Daisy is dying. She urges him to come out to say goodbye before Daisy is taken to the vet and euthanized, and he does. Daisy ends up dying in the hospital.

Meanwhile, Via's best friend Miranda has started avoiding her, for reasons unknown to Via. Both audition for the lead in their school play, and Miranda gets the part, with Via as her understudy. On opening night, Miranda sees Via's family in the audience and feigns illness so that Via can take her place for the evening. After the show, the two reconcile.

At the end of August's school year, the fifth-grade class goes on a three-day trip to a nature reserve. August is initially concerned about going because of Julian, but hears that Julian will not be attending. On the last night of the trip, August and Jack go to the toilet alone in the woods to avoid waiting in line for the bathroom. The two are attacked by a group of older students from another school. Julian's friends happen to walk by, and they rush to the defense of their classmates, impressed by August's boldness in standing up to the bullies. August becomes accepted by his school peers.

August finds out Julian will be going to another school in the following year. At graduation, August is awarded the Henry Ward Beecher Medal for his strength and character throughout the school year.

== Reception ==
=== Critical reception ===
The book received primarily positive reviews from professional critics. Common Sense Media gave Wonder four out of five stars, calling it a "moving, uplifting tale about a disfigured boy with inner beauty." Entertainment Weekly said: "In a wonder of a debut, Palacio has written a crackling page-turner filled with characters you can't help but root for." The New York Times called it, "rich and memorable [...] It's Auggie and the rest of the children who are the real heart of Wonder, and Palacio captures the voices of girls and boys, fifth graders, and teenagers, with equal skill."

Critiques of the books by activists in the disability rights movement were more mixed. Disability activist Carly Findlay identified strongly with the story, saying, "as a reader with a visible difference, I will say that it's very well researched." Disfigured person Mike Moody, writing on the Disability in Kidlit blog, described the book as "an engaging, heart-rending story about disfigurement" but also discussed disappointment over the "missed opportunity" in the continued downplaying of the main character's disability and his persistent lack of agency. Ariel Henley, an author with Crouzon syndrome, wrote an article in Teen Vogue titled "What 'Wonder' Gets Wrong About Disfigurement and Craniofacial Disorders"; the article focuses on the casting of a non-disabled actor for the movie adaptation, but also discusses the plot, arguing that "Auggie is used as a prop to teach those around him about acceptance and compassion."

The disability slur retarded is present on page 218. While R. J. Palacio was emailed for an explanation on why the word was used and suggestions to remove it, R. J. Palacio has dismissed these suggestions, explaining that the word was used by a ten-year-old boy who does not know how to use words like "developmentally delayed".

=== Awards ===
- The New York Times Best Seller list
- Texas Bluebonnet Award master list
- 2014 Maine Student Book Award
- In Illinois, it won both the Bluestem and Caudill Awards in 2014
- Vermont's Dorothy Canfield Fisher Children's Book Award,
- 2015 Mark Twain Readers Award
- Hawaii's 2015 Nene Award
- Junior Young Reader's Choice Award for 2015

=== Sales ===
The novel has been translated into 29 languages for worldwide sales: Spanish, Catalan, Japanese, German, French, Portuguese, Danish, Czech, Serbian, Arabic, Hebrew, Norwegian, Icelandic, Swedish, Faroese, Turkish, Dutch, Persian, Italian, Finnish, Russian, Korean, Chinese, Ukrainian, Polish, Croatian, Greek, Romanian, Vietnamese, and Slovenian.

First published in 2012 by Alfred A. Knopf (now part of Penguin Random House), the novel was a top seller for the firm when the film was released in 2017, when it sold 5 million copies in combined book and ebook units in the United States.

== Adaptations ==
The film adaptation was directed by Stephen Chbosky, written by Steven Conrad, and starring Julia Roberts and Owen Wilson as Isabel and Nate Pullman respectively, Daveed Diggs as Mr. Browne, Mandy Patinkin as Mr. Tushman, and Jacob Tremblay as August Pullman. It was released on 17 November 2017 by Lionsgate.

=== Spinoff/prequel ===
A film adaptation of White Bird was released in 2023. It was directed by Marc Forster and written by Mark Bomback, starring Bryce Gheisar, Gillian Anderson, and Helen Mirren as Julian Albans, Vivienne, and Grandmère respectively. The film was supposed to be released on 14 October 2022, after being initially scheduled to release on 16 September 2022. In January 2023, it was announced that the film was scheduled to debut in a limited release on 18 August 2023, followed by a wide release on 25 August 2023. It was delayed again due to the 2023 SAG-AFTRA strike, then premiered at the 43rd San Francisco Jewish Film Festival on July 30, 2023.

=== Stage Adaptation ===
From December 2025 to February 2026, the American Repertory Theatre in Boston, Massachusetts showed a stage version of Wonder, titled "Wonder the Musical". The main cast included Melvin Abston as Mr. Tushman, Raymond J. Lee as Mr. Browne, Javier Muñoz as Nate Pullman, Alison Luff as Isabel Pullman, and Pearl Sun and Mrs. Petosa/Mrs. Albans. The role of Auggie was double-cast with Garrett McNally performing at certain shows and Max Voehl at others. Both actors have facial differences, with McNally having Treacher Collins Syndrome and Voehl having a bilateral cleft lip and palate.

== Related books ==
=== Auggie & Me ===
Auggie & Me is a companion book to Wonder. It contains three stories, each telling the events of Wonder from different perspectives. The first story, called "The Julian Chapter," is told from the point of view of school bully Julian, explaining why he mistreats Auggie. The second, called "Pluto," focuses on Auggie's life before Beecher Prep and is told from the point of view of Christopher, Auggie's oldest friend. The third is called "Shingaling" and is told from the point of view of Auggie's classmate Charlotte, who, in Wonder, is the first person that is nice to him at Beecher Prep; it focuses on relationships and events between some of the girls in Auggie's year, such as Ximena Chin, Summer Dawson, and Maya Markowitz.

Though originally published separately, the three stories were eventually grouped together and sold as one book.

=== 365 Days of Wonder ===
In Wonder, Auggie's teacher Mr. Browne assigns a precept to each month. 365 Days of Wonder contains 365 of his precepts as well as some of Mr. Browne's thoughts after every month.

=== We're All Wonders ===
In this short picture book, Auggie talks about his life before the events of Wonder. He has his astronaut helmet on most of the time throughout.

=== White Bird: A Wonder Story ===
In this 2019 graphic novel, Julian's Parisian grandmother tells him stories of her childhood as a young Jewish girl living in Nazi-occupied France during World War II, when she was hidden from the Nazis by a classmate and his family. A film adaptation was released in October 2024.

Awards
Preceded by The Unwanteds	Mark Twain Award; 2015	Succeeded by Escape from Mr. Lemoncello's Library
Preceded by Diary of a Wimpy Kid: Cabin Fever	Young Reader's Choice Award; 2015	Succeeded by Escape from Mr. Lemoncello's Library
