= R. J. Palacio =

American author and graphic designer

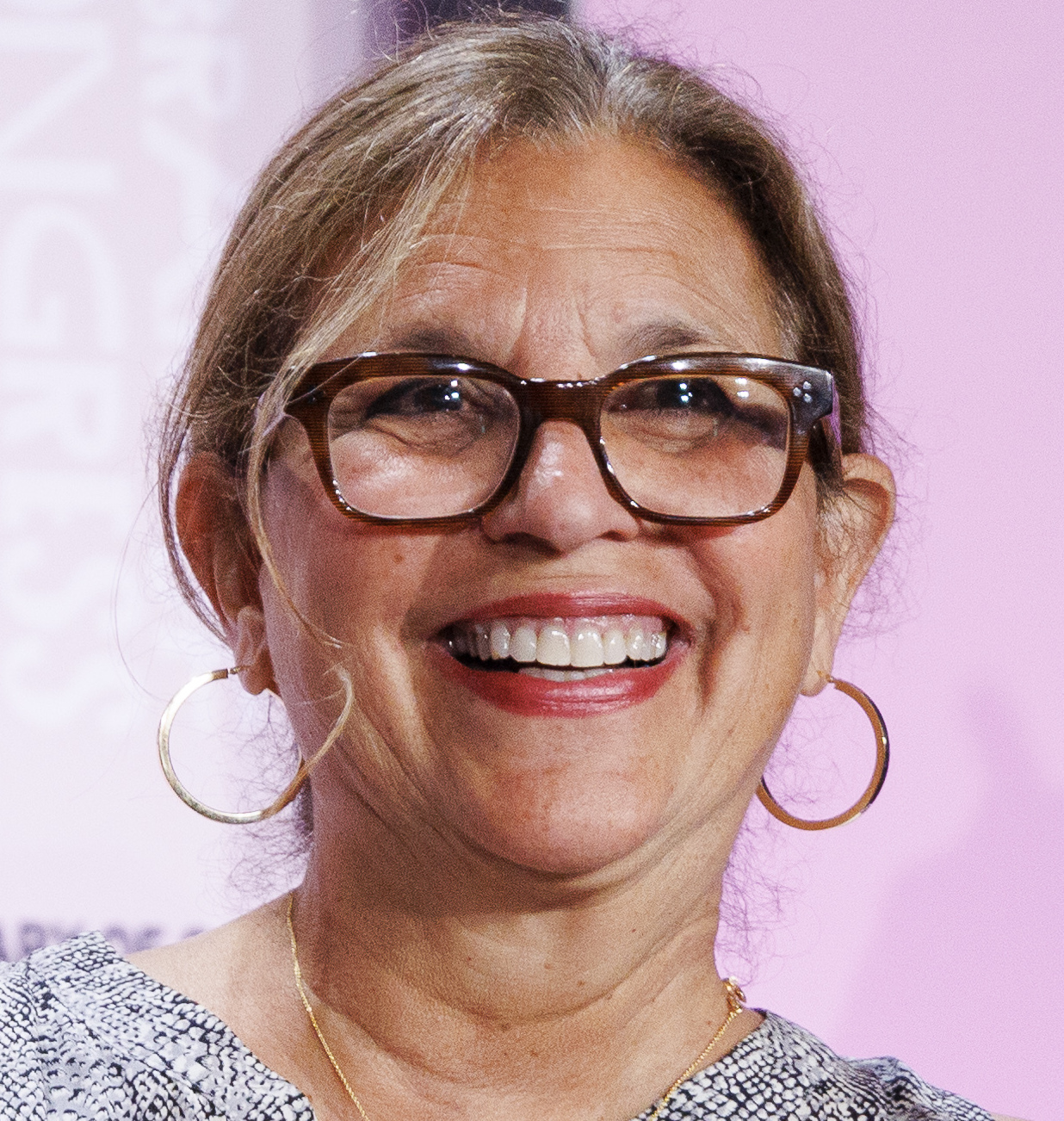
- Palacio at the 2023 National Book Festival
- Born: Raquel Jaramillo; July 13, 1963 (age 63); New York City, U.S.
- Occupation: Author

Raquel Jaramillo Palacio (born July 13, 1963) is an American author and graphic designer. She is the author of several novels for children, including the best-selling Wonder, which was adapted into a 2017 film starring Julia Roberts and Owen Wilson.

== Career ==
R.J. began her writing career as an illustrator, designing book covers for Paul Auster, Thomas Pynchon, and others. During the course of her career she designed many hundreds of book covers, covering both fiction and non-fiction books. She also illustrated several children's books that she wrote herself. For the first two decades of her career, she wrote books at night after her day job as a designer. She illustrated her early books which were board books for children, published under the name Raquel Jaramillo.

Following Wonder's international success, Palacio published several companion books to the novel. Published in 2014, 365 Days of Wonder is a collection of quotes or precepts that highlight kindness and goodness, interspersed with letters and emails written by the characters in Wonder. Auggie & Me (2015) comprises three short stories written about and from the perspectives of Auggie's friends, Christopher and Charlotte, and Auggie's nemesis, Julian. We’re All Wonders (2017) is a picture book for younger readers which tells Auggie’s story from his own perspective. Finally, White Bird (2019) is a graphic novel which tells the story of Julian's Grandmère when she was a young Jewish girl hidden from the Nazis by a family in France during World War II. White Bird, released as a motion picture in October 2024, stars Ariella Glaser, Orlando Schwerdt, Bryce Gheisar (who originally starred as Julian in the Wonder film), Gillian Anderson, and Helen Mirren.

In 2021, Random House announced that her new novel Pony would have a first printing of 500,000 copies. It is her first novel not featuring the characters from the Wonder universe.

== Personal life ==
Born in New York City as the daughter of Colombian immigrants, Palacio attended Manhattan's High School of Art & Design and majored in designing at the Parsons School of Design. She spent a year at the American University of Paris, travelling widely throughout Europe, before returning to New York. She currently lives in Brooklyn with her husband Russell Gordon, an executive art director at Simon and Schuster Children's Books, and their two sons Caleb and Joseph.

== Awards and honors ==
She was a recipient of the Christopher Award for Wonder in 2013, and the Dorothy Canfield Fisher Children's Book Award as well as the German Children's Book Award (Youth Jury) in 2014. Wonder was on The New York Times Best Seller list and was also on the Texas Bluebonnet Award master list. Wonder was the winner of the 2014 Maine Student Book Award, Vermont's Dorothy Canfield Fisher Children's Book Award, the 2015 Mark Twain Award, Hawaii's 2015 Nene Award, the 2015 Young Hoosier Book Award, and the Junior Young Reader's Choice Award for 2015. In Illinois, it won both the Bluestem and Caudill Awards in 2014.

In 2018, she was named as the Kids for Peace 'Peace Hero' of the year.

== Published works ==
- Ride, Baby, Ride (1998)
- Dream, Baby, Dream! (1998)
- Last Summer: A Little Book for Dads (2004)
- Wonder (2012)
- Auggie & Me: Three Wonder Stories (2014)
- 365 Days of Wonder: Mr. Browne's Book of Precepts (2014)
- We're all Wonders (2017)
- White Bird (2019)
- Pony (2021)
