= White Bird (film) =

2024 film by Marc Forster

- Theatrical release poster
- Directed by: Marc Forster
- Screenplay by: Mark Bomback
- Based on: White Bird: A Wonder Story by R. J. Palacio
- Produced by: Todd Lieberman; David Hoberman; R. J. Palacio
- Starring: Ariella Glaser; Orlando Schwerdt; Bryce Gheisar; Gillian Anderson; Helen Mirren
- Cinematography: Matthias Koenigswieser
- Edited by: Matt Chessé
- Music by: Thomas Newman
- Production companies: Lionsgate; Mandeville Films
- Distributed by: Lionsgate
- Release dates: January 4, 2024 (International); October 4, 2024 (United States)
- Running time: 121 minutes
- Country: United States
- Language: English
- Budget: $20 million
- Box office: $9.1 million

White Bird (marketed with the subtitle A Wonder Story) is a 2024 American war drama film directed by Marc Forster from a screenplay by Mark Bomback, based on the 2019 graphic novel of the same name by R. J. Palacio. Serving as both a spin-off prequel and a sequel to Wonder (2017), it stars Ariella Glaser, Orlando Schwerdt, Bryce Gheisar, Gillian Anderson, and Helen Mirren, with Gheisar reprising his role as Julian Albans from Wonder.

White Bird was released in Italy, Slovenia, and Croatia on January 4, 2024; it was released in the United States by Lionsgate on October 4, 2024, to positive reviews from critics.

== Plot ==
Several years after being expelled from Beecher Prep for his cruelty towards Auggie Pullman, (Note: As depicted in 2017's Wonder) 15-year-old Julian Albans has been transferred to Union Tech and Yates Academy. He is visited by his grandmother, from Paris; in response to Julian's reflection about having to be socially passive to fit in at his new school, she recounts her childhood as a young Jewish girl in Nazi-occupied France during World War II.

In 1942, a then-frivolous Sara Blum lives with her parents, Max and Rose, in the zone libre of France. Late that year, the Nazis extend their occupation, oppression of the Jewish citizens escalates, and the Blums start making plans to leave the country. Sara evades a surprise Gestapo roundup at her school. She gains maturity while spending over a year being hidden with the help of her classmate Julien Beaumier (whose leg is paralyzed as a result of poliomyelitis). Julien's parents, Vivienne and Jean Paul, conceal Sara in a barn next to their house. The Beaumiers tell Sara that she must never go outside, lest she be discovered by their neighbors, whom they suspect of being Gestapo or Milice informers.

Each night, Julien teaches Sara what he learned at school that day. The affection between them eventually grows into love.

In 1944, after the liberation of Monte Cassino, Julien is arrested by the Milice at a checkpoint on his way to school and transported to a remote camp in the mountains. During an escape attempt by other prisoners, Julien is shot dead. After the war, Sara is reunited with her father, Max, but learns that her mother, Rose, was killed at Auschwitz. Some time later, Max accepts a new job in Paris. He and Sara move there, but she makes sure to preserve her friendship with the Beaumiers and visit them often.

Back in the present, Julian, moved by his grandmother's story, decides to make amends with his past and become a better person.

== Cast ==
- Ariella Glaser as Sara Blum, a Jewish French schoolgirl
- Orlando Schwerdt as Julien Beaumier
- Bryce Gheisar as Julian Albans
- Gillian Anderson as Vivienne Beaumier
- Helen Mirren as Grandmother
- Patsy Ferran as Mlle Petitjean
- Ishai Golan as Max Blum
- Jem Matthews as Vincent
- Stuart McQuarrie as Pastor Luc
- Olivia Ross as Rose Blum
- Jo Stone-Fewings as Jean Paul Beaumier

A photographic still of Jacob Tremblay as Auggie Pullman from Wonder is used in the beginning of the film.

== Production ==
In October 2019, Lionsgate acquired the rights to R.J. Palacio's White Bird: A Wonder Story. Palacio said, "the team at Lionsgate values artists and storytellers and has been crucial to expanding the fan community surrounding Wonder. They have been enormously supportive as I have been writing White Bird and I could not feel more secure that my new graphic novel is in the right creative hands at the right studio."

Todd Lieberman and David Hoberman from Mandeville Films served as producers, with Jeffrey Skoll and Robert Kissel from Participant as executive producers. Marc Forster was announced as director, with Mark Bomback writing and acting as executive producer.

Media Capital Technologies co-financed the film.

In February 2021, it was reported that Helen Mirren, Gillian Anderson, Orlando Schwerdt, and Ariella Glaser joined the cast. Bryce Gheisar was confirmed to reprise his role as Julian from the 2017 film Wonder.

Principal photography commenced in February 2021 in the Czech Republic.

== Release ==
White Bird was initially scheduled for a wide release on September 16, 2022, but was later delayed to October 14, 2022. In September 2022, Lionsgate removed the film from its release schedule. The film, presented as a "sneak preview", premiered at the 43rd San Francisco Jewish Film Festival on July 30, 2023, with a taped introduction by producer Lieberman.

In January 2023, it was announced that White Bird would debut in a limited release on August 18, 2023, followed by a wide release on August 25, 2023. However, in July 2023, as a result of the SAG-AFTRA strike, Lionsgate pushed the release to an unspecified date in the fourth quarter of 2023. In December 2023, Lionsgate rescheduled the film for a wide release in the United States on October 4, 2024.

White Bird was released in Italy, Croatia, and Slovenia on January 4, 2024. On January 18, 2024, the film was released in Portugal, followed by its theatrical release in Poland on February 2, 2024.

== Reception ==
=== Box office ===
As of November 13, 2024, White Bird has grossed $5.1 million in the United States and Canada, and $4 million in other territories, for a worldwide total of $9.1 million.

In the film's domestic opening weekend it made $1.5 million from 1,018 theaters, finishing seventh at the box office.

In Poland, the film debuted to $158,519 from 227 theaters, and went on to gross a total of $1.2 million.

=== Critical response ===
On the review aggregator website Rotten Tomatoes, 75% of 48 critics' reviews are positive, with an average rating of 6.7/10. The website's consensus reads: "Packaging difficult subject matter into a digestible morality tale, White Bird is a soft-pedaled but ultimately moving drama fit for the whole family." Metacritic, which uses a weighted average, assigned the film a score of 54 out of 100, based on 14 critics, indicating "mixed or average" reviews.

Writing for Variety, Dennis Harvey gave a positive review, saying that "Marc Forster's film elevates somewhat contrived material with tastefully lyrical craftsmanship". He further added: "Though the occasional preachy, maudlin or trite note remains, Forster also manages to make “White Bird” less conspicuously conceived for tweens. He arrives at an unhurried yet sufficiently suspenseful pace that engrosses while side-stepping excess melodrama and sentimentality".

Keith Garlington of Keith & the Movies praised White Bird: "(It) navigates its solemn subjects with an open-hearted optimism, incisively exploring its themes of kindness, cruelty, forgiveness, and sacrifice. The film doesn't say anything especially new, but it head-on confronts the cycles of hatred that have long plagued humanity. It leads to a powerful and forever relevant message that is enriched by top-to-bottom terrific performances and a director who never takes his finger off the human pulse."

Hannah Brown was more reserved in her review for The Jerusalem Post, describing the cast as "compelling" and praising the storyline for its power "to carry the drama". However, she criticised White Bird for its "moments of heavy kitsch toward the end" and credited Mirren with single-handedly saving the movie. Brown concluded: "Despite its flaws, [the film] does not trivialize the Holocaust, and just barely manages to avoid being part of that mini-genre I have named 'Feel-Good Holocaust Films'. ... In White Bird, at least, it is clear that innocent people, even very cute ones, suffered terribly at the hands of the Nazis and their collaborators, and even paid with their lives. The two likable young leads and Mirren elevate this to a film that does have genuinely touching moments".
