= Secret Headquarters =

Film by Henry Joost and Ariel Schulman

- Official release poster
- Directed by: Henry Joost; Ariel Schulman
- Screenplay by: Christopher L. Yost; Josh Koenigsberg; Henry Joost; Ariel Schulman
- Story by: Christopher L. Yost
- Produced by: Jerry Bruckheimer; Chad Oman; Orlee-Rose Strauss
- Starring: Owen Wilson; Walker Scobell; Jesse Williams; Keith L. Williams; Momona Tamada; Charles Melton; Michael Peña
- Cinematography: Larry Fong
- Edited by: Gregory Plotkin
- Music by: Lorne Balfe
- Production companies: Paramount Pictures; Jerry Bruckheimer Films
- Distributed by: Paramount+
- Release dates: August 8, 2022 (Arlington); August 12, 2022 (United States)
- Running time: 104 minutes
- Country: United States
- Language: English

Secret Headquarters is a 2022 American superhero comedy film directed by Henry Joost and Ariel Schulman, who co-wrote the movie with Christopher L. Yost and Josh Koenigsberg, based on a story by Yost. Starring Owen Wilson, Walker Scobell, Jesse Williams, Keith L. Williams, Momona Tamada, Charles Melton, and Michael Peña, the plot follows a child (Scobell) and his friends (K. L. Williams, Tamada, Witherspoon and Curtis) who begins to suspect his father (Wilson) might be a superhero after discovering a secret headquarters in his basement.

The film premiered at the Signature Theater in Arlington, Virginia on August 8, 2022, and was released in the United States on August 12, 2022, on Paramount+. The film received generally mixed reviews from critics.

== Plot ==
Jack Kincaid is an ordinary human man who lives with his wife Lily and their 4-year-old son Charlie. One night, while they're on a camping trip, something falls from the sky. Jack goes to check it out. He finds an unknown ship and it gives him a kind of sphere that grants him superpowers. Over time, he uses these powers to help people around the world and is dubbed "The Guard", but his hero duties cause him to neglect his parental duties to Charlie, driving a wedge between them, and causing him and Lily to divorce. 10 years later, when Charlie stays at Jack's house for his 14th birthday, he invites his best friend Barry Berger (with his older brother "Big Mac" Berger), his crush Maya Monroe, and her best friend Lizzie McGonagall over, where they find Jack's underground lair and find out his secret identity. Meanwhile, weapons CEO Ansel Argon wants to use The Guard's power source for his sinister schemes.

After the kids use Jack's gadgets, Argon's head mercenary, Sean Irons, brings his team to track down the power source. The kids fight back against them, and Jack manages to arrive just in time, but when Berger sends the source through a portal connected to his locker at school, Argon uses one of Jack's gadgets to get his suit and kidnaps Berger to find the source. Charlie leads his friends, plus a reformed Irons, to get their gadgets to fight back. The showdown takes place during the school dance, ending with Charlie sending Argon through a portal to another dimension with a grenade. He ends up dancing with Maya and kissing her. Charlie ends up joining Jack so they can fight crime together, while Irons ends up becoming Jack's mission control.

== Cast ==
- Owen Wilson as Jack Kincaid/The Guard, a superhero.
- Walker Scobell as Charlie Kincaid
  - Louie Chaplin Moss as Younger Charlie Kincaid
- Keith L. Williams as Barry Berger
- Momona Tamada as Maya Monroe
- Abby James Witherspoon as Lizzie McGonagall
- Kezii Curtis as "Big Mac" Berger
- Michael Peña as Ansel Argon
- Jesse Williams as Sean Irons
- Charles Melton as Hawaii
- Jessie Mueller as Lily Kincaid
- Lucius Baston as Jerry the Janitor
- DK Metcalf as Coach Hammer
- Dustin Ingram as Jersey
- Levy Tran as Virginia
- Michael Anthony as Wisconsin
- Lav Luv as Umpire
- Dayna Beilenson as Ms. Squint
- David Lengel as Coach Skipper

== Production ==
Secret Headquarters was announced in January 2021, when it was reported that Henry Joost and Ariel Schulman would direct the film for Paramount Pictures and would also work on the current draft for the project with Josh Koenigsberg from an original idea by Christopher Yost. In May, Owen Wilson was cast in an undisclosed role. Principal photography began in Atlanta, Georgia on May 25. In June, Michael Peña, Walker Scobell, Momona Tamada, Keith L. Williams, Abby James Witherspoon, and Kezii Curtis were all announced as part of the cast. In July, Jesse Williams joined the cast as the villain. Lorne Balfe composed the score.

== Release ==
Secret Headquarters was released on Paramount+ on August 12, 2022. It was originally scheduled to be released in theaters on August 5, 2022, before moving to streaming on the same date. The film's red carpet premiere took place at the Signature Theater in New York City on August 8, 2022.

=== Home media ===
Secret Headquarters was released on Blu-ray and DVD on December 20, 2022.

=== Critical reception ===
On the review aggregator website Rotten Tomatoes, 45% of 38 critics' reviews are positive, with an average rating of 5.2/10. The website's consensus reads: "There are far worse family viewing options, but given the talent assembled, Secret Headquarters is a disappointingly bland and muddled action movie." Metacritic assigned the film a weighted average score of 47 out of 100, based on 13 critics, indicating "mixed or average reviews".
