= Wonder (film) =

2017 film by Stephen Chbosky

- Theatrical release poster
- Directed by: Stephen Chbosky
- Screenplay by: Stephen Chbosky; Steven Conrad; Jack Thorne
- Based on: Wonder by R.J. Palacio
- Produced by: David Hoberman; Todd Lieberman
- Starring: Julia Roberts; Owen Wilson; Jacob Tremblay; Mandy Patinkin; Daveed Diggs
- Cinematography: Don Burgess
- Edited by: Mark Livolsi
- Music by: Marcelo Zarvos
- Production companies: Participant Media; Walden Media; Mandeville Films; TIK Films
- Distributed by: Lionsgate Films
- Release dates: November 14, 2017 (Regency Village Theater); November 17, 2017 (United States)
- Running time: 113 minutes
- Country: United States
- Language: English
- Budget: $20 million
- Box office: $315 million

Wonder is a 2017 American coming-of-age family comedy drama film directed by Stephen Chbosky, who co-wrote the screenplay with Steven Conrad and Jack Thorne. It is based on the 2012 novel by R. J. Palacio and stars Julia Roberts, Owen Wilson, Jacob Tremblay, Mandy Patinkin, and Daveed Diggs.

The film follows a boy named August "Auggie" Pullman with Treacher Collins syndrome as he tries to fit in. The film was released in the United States on November 17, 2017, by Lionsgate. It received positive reviews from critics and grossed $315 million worldwide on a $20 million production budget. At the 90th Academy Awards, the film was nominated for Best Makeup and Hairstyling.

A spin-off and prequel film, White Bird, was released in October 2024, with Bryce Gheisar reprising his role.

== Plot ==
August "Auggie" Pullman is a 10-year-old boy living in Brooklyn with his parents, Isabel and Nate, older sister Olivia "Via", and their dog, Daisy. Auggie was born with a rare medical facial deformity, mandibulofacial dysostosis. He has undergone 27 surgeries to help him function and wears an astronaut helmet to hide his face in public. As Auggie approaches fifth grade, his parents decide to stop homeschooling him and enroll him at Beecher Prep, a private middle school. At the start of the school year, he is ostracized and is constantly bullied by classmate Julian Albans and his friends Amos, Miles, and Henry, but Auggie soon forms a close friendship with his classmate Jack Will, whom he met during a tour of the school.

For Halloween, Auggie is forced to reuse his Ghostface costume from the previous year after Daisy ruins his planned Boba Fett costume. On entering his homeroom, he overhears Jack, who does not recognize him (expecting him to be dressed as Boba Fett), joining Julian and his friends in making fun of him behind his back, claiming he was forced to be friends with Auggie and would "kill himself" if he looked like Auggie. Auggie is devastated and becomes sick, forcing Isabel to abandon her mother-daughter day with Via to pick him up. Though she is hurt, Via convinces Auggie to go trick-or-treating with her, as she has been rejected by her own best friend, Miranda.

Auggie begins avoiding Jack and forms a new friendship with another classmate, Summer Dawson, confiding in her about his split with Jack. When Jack eventually asks Summer why Auggie is avoiding him, she says "Ghostface",. This gets Jack to realize his mistake. Feeling remorseful for his actions and as an apology, he decides to partner with Auggie instead of Julian and Amos for the science fair project, angering Julian. When Julian confronts Jack about it and calls Auggie a freak, they get into a fight. Outraged, Julian ends his friendship with Jack. Jack is suspended for two days, though the principal, Mr. Tushman, realizes Jack's motives and accepts his letter of apology. Later, Daisy is rushed to the vet after falling ill and dies shortly after, leaving the family grief-stricken. Jack then apologizes to Auggie via Minecraft, and they reconcile.

Meanwhile, Via has been feeling left out; ever since Auggie was born, Isabel and Nate have spent considerably more time looking after him than paying attention to her. Via signs up for the drama club after meeting theater nerd Justin Hollander, with whom she begins a romantic relationship. Via is selected as Miranda's understudy for the lead role in the school's production of Our Town, but on opening night, Miranda feigns illness to let Via take her place after learning that Via's family is in attendance while her own is not. Via gives a moving performance, earning a standing ovation, and reconciles with Miranda.

Auggie's popularity and circle of friends grow after he and Jack win first prize at the science fair, but Julian and his friends still bully Auggie. Eventually, Mr. Tushman confronts Julian and his parents with evidence, including hate notes and a class picture with Auggie photoshopped out and a caption reading "No freaks allowed". Mrs. Albans admits she deleted Auggie from the picture, defends Julian's actions, and insists that students should not be exposed to Auggie. Despite the Albans' threats to pull funding, Julian is suspended for two days, forcing him to miss an upcoming nature retreat. As they leave, Mrs. Albans declares that Julian will not be back in the fall. However, Julian apologizes to Mr. Tushman, who forgives him.

At the nature retreat, Auggie and Jack are threatened by a trio of seventh graders from another school, but Amos, Miles, and Henry defend them. Just before Auggie's graduation, Nate reveals to him that he put his astronaut helmet in his office, and asks Auggie if he needs it back, but Auggie is content to go without it. At the graduation ceremony, Auggie thanks Isabel for enrolling him in school, and Isabel tells Auggie that he is a "wonder". Auggie is given the Henry Ward Beecher Medal for his strength and courage throughout the school year.

== Cast ==
- Jacob Tremblay as August "Auggie" Pullman, a boy with Treacher Collins Syndrome.
- Julia Roberts as Isabel Pullman, Auggie's mother.
- Owen Wilson as Nate Pullman, Auggie's father.
- Izabela Vidovic as Olivia "Via" Pullman, Auggie's older sister.
  - Maccie Margaret Chbosky as young Via
- Mandy Patinkin as Mr. Lawrence Tushman, Auggie's principal.
- Daveed Diggs as Mr. Thomas Browne, Auggie's English teacher.
- Sônia Braga as Grans, Auggie's maternal grandmother.
- Danielle Rose Russell as Miranda Navas, Via's best friend.
- Nadji Jeter as Justin Hollander, Via's boyfriend.
- Noah Jupe as Jack Will, Auggie's best friend.
- Bryce Gheisar as Julian Albans, Auggie's main rival, and the class bully.
- Millie Davis as Summer Dawson, Auggie's classmate and friend.
- Elle McKinnon as Charlotte Cody, Auggie's classmate and friend.
- Nicole Oliver as Amanda Will, Jack's mother.
- Crystal Lowe as Melissa Albans, Julian's mother.
- Steve Bacic as Richard Albans, Julian's father.
- Ali Liebert as Ms. Petosa, Auggie's science teacher.

== Production ==
=== Development ===
On November 27, 2012, it was announced that Lionsgate was developing a feature film adaptation of R. J. Palacio's debut novel Wonder, and were in talks with John August to write the screenplay. Mandeville Films' David Hoberman and Todd Lieberman produced the film.

On August 9, 2010, Jack Thorne was hired to adapt the novel after August had departed from the project. In October 2014, John Krokidas was reported to be directing the film, though in April 2015, Paul King was hired to direct instead. Steven Conrad was writing the script at that time.

=== Casting ===
On April 14, 2016, Jacob Tremblay was cast to play the lead role, Auggie Pullman, while Julia Roberts was in talks to play Auggie's mother. Three weeks later, Roberts' casting was confirmed, and Stephen Chbosky was set as the film's director.

On June 27, 2016, Owen Wilson joined to play Auggie's father. Two weeks later, newcomer Noah Jupe joined the cast as Auggie's best friend at school, and on July 15, Daveed Diggs was cast as Mr. Browne, an English teacher at the school.

On August 19, 2016, Sônia Braga joined the cast, portraying the role of Roberts' character's mother.

=== Special effects ===
Tremblay's prosthetic makeup, designed and created by Arjen Tuiten, took an hour and a half to apply. It consisted of a skull cap with prosthetic ears attached, a facial prosthetic that covered Tremblay's face, and a wig to tie it all together.

=== Filming ===
Filming took place in several locations in New York and British Columbia, Canada, from July 18 to September 13, 2016. The school Beecher Prep in the film is fictional.

=== Music ===
Marcelo Zarvos composed the film's score. Bea Miller composed a song for the film, "Brand New Eyes". It was released on August 3, 2017. Wonder author R. J. Palacio has often credited Natalie Merchant's song "Wonder", from her 1995 album Tigerlily, as the inspiration for her best-selling book. At Merchant's invitation, the song was featured on the soundtrack. The song is also played during the film's end credits.

== Release ==
Lionsgate had initially scheduled Wonder to be released in the United States on April 7, 2017. On February 13, 2017, it was announced that the release date had been pushed back to November 17, 2017. Wonder had its world premiere at the Regency Village Theater in Los Angeles on November 14, 2017.

== Reception ==
=== Box office ===
Wonder grossed $132 million in the United States and Canada, and $182 million in other territories, for a worldwide total of $315 million, against a production budget of $20 million. Deadline Hollywood calculated the film made a net profit of $55.3 million, when factoring together all expenses and revenues.

In the United States and Canada, Wonder opened alongside Justice League, The Star, and Roman J. Israel, Esq. and was initially projected to gross around $9 million from 3,096 theaters in its first weekend. However, after grossing $740,000 from Thursday night previews and receiving a large number of group ticket sales, weekend projections were upped to $15 million. Weekend projections were again increased, this time to $28 million, after the film made $9.4 million on its first day. The film went on to debut to $27.5 million, finishing second at the box office, behind Justice League. In its second weekend, the film dropped just 17.7%, grossing $22.7 million and finishing third at the box office.

=== Critical response ===
On review aggregator Rotten Tomatoes, the film has an approval rating of 86% based on 189 reviews, and an average rating of 7.1/10. The site's critical consensus reads, "Wonder doesn't shy away from its bestselling source material's sentiment, but this well-acted and overall winsome drama earns its tugs at the heartstrings." On Metacritic, the film has a weighted average score of 66 out of 100, based on 33 critics, indicating "generally favorable reviews". Audiences polled by CinemaScore gave the film an rare "A+" grade on a A+ to F scale, one of approximately 100 films in the history of the service to receive the grade.

Some reviewers criticized the decision to cast an actor without the same condition as Auggie as undermining the film's message. In August 2021, during Edinburgh TV Festival's MacTaggart Lecture, co-writer Jack Thorne, while not specifically citing Wonder, acknowledged that he had failed to stand up for disabled talent on projects involving the subject, and sought to rectify this through pushing for new disability initiatives like 'Underlying Health Condition', which launched in December 2021.

=== Accolades ===
Award	Date of ceremony	Category	Recipients	Result	Ref.
AARP's Movies for Grownups Awards	February 5, 2018	Best Intergenerational Film	Wonder	Nominated	
AARP's Movies for Grownups Awards	February 5, 2018	Readers' Choice Poll	Wonder	Nominated	
Academy Awards	March 4, 2018	Best Makeup and Hairstyling	Arjen Tuiten	Nominated	
British Academy Film Awards	February 18, 2018	Best Makeup and Hair	Naomi Bakstad, Robert Pandini and Arjen Tuiten	Nominated	
Casting Society of America	January 18, 2018	Big Budget – Comedy	Deborah Aquila, Kara Eide, Tricia Wood and Kris Woz	Nominated	
Critics' Choice Movie Awards	January 11, 2018	Best Young Actor/Actress	Jacob Tremblay	Nominated	
Critics' Choice Movie Awards	January 11, 2018	Best Adapted Screenplay	Jack Thorne, Steve Conrad and Stephen Chbosky	Nominated	
Critics' Choice Movie Awards	January 11, 2018	Best Hair & Makeup	Wonder	Nominated	
Heartland Film Festival	December 31, 2017	Truly Moving Picture Award	Stephen Chbosky	Won	
Hochi Film Award	December 18, 2018	Best International Picture	Stephen Chbosky	Won	
London Film Critics Circle	January 28, 2018	Young British/Irish Performer of the Year	Noah Jupe	Nominated	
Make-Up Artists and Hair Stylists Guild	February 24, 2018	Feature Motion Picture: Best Contemporary Makeup	Naomi Bakstad, Jean Black and Megan Harkness	Nominated	
Make-Up Artists and Hair Stylists Guild	February 24, 2018	Feature Motion Picture: Best Contemporary Hair Styling	Robert Pandini and Alisa Macmillan	Nominated	
Make-Up Artists and Hair Stylists Guild	February 24, 2018	Feature Motion Picture: Best Special Makeup Effects	Michael Nickiforek and Arjen Tuiten	Nominated	
Make-Up Artists and Hair Stylists Guild	February 24, 2018	Feature Motion Picture: Best Contemporary Hair Styling	Robert Pandini and Alisa Macmillan	Nominated	
Make-Up Artists and Hair Stylists Guild	February 24, 2018	Feature Motion Picture: Best Special Makeup Effects	Michael Nickiforek and Arjen Tuiten	Nominated	
Saturn Awards	June 27, 2018	Best Performance by a Younger Actor	Jacob Tremblay	Nominated	
Saturn Awards	June 27, 2018	Best Make-up	Arjen Tuiten	Nominated	
Saturn Awards	June 27, 2018	Best Independent Film	Wonder	Won	
Seattle Film Critics Society	December 18, 2017	Best Youth Performance	Jacob Tremblay	Nominated	
Washington D.C. Area Film Critics Association	December 8, 2017	Best Youth Performance	Jacob Tremblay	Nominated	
Women Film Critics Circle	December 17, 2017	Best Family Film	Wonder	Nominated	
Teen Choice Awards	August 12, 2018	Choice Drama	Wonder	Nominated	
Teen Choice Awards	August 12, 2018	Choice Drama Actor	Jacob Tremblay	Nominated	
Teen Choice Awards	August 12, 2018	Choice Drama Actress	Julia Roberts	Nominated	

== Follow-ups ==
=== Sequel/prequel film ===
White Bird: A Wonder Story, a spin-off sequel/prequel war drama film to Wonder based on R. J. Palacio's graphic novel of the same name, starring Gillian Anderson and Helen Mirren, with Bryce Gheisar reprising his role as Julian Albans, began production in February 2021 in the Czech Republic. Described as a "companion piece" to the original film, the film follows Julian as his Parisian grandmother tells him stories of her childhood as a young Jewish girl living in Nazi-occupied France during World War II, when she was hidden from the Nazis by a classmate and his family. Initially scheduled to be released on September 16, 2022, the film's release date was ultimately delayed to October 14, 2022 before the film was removed from the release schedule in September, envisaging an August 2023 release. However Lionsgate pushed the release to an unspecified date, in July 2023, as a result of the SAG-AFTRA strike, in the fourth quarter of 2023. In December 2023, Lionsgate scheduled the film for release on October 4, 2024.

=== Musical adaptation ===
On April 9, 2019, it was announced that a musical adaptation of the film was in the works for Broadway, with Jill Furman (Hamilton) producing and R. J. Palacio adapting the novel for the stage production. The production premiered at the American Repertory Theater in Cambridge, Massachusetts on December 17, 2025 and ran through February 15, 2026.

== See also ==
- Mask (1985 film)
