= The Astronauts (TV series) =

American action-adventure television series

- Genre: Action-adventure
- Created by: Daniel Knauf
- Starring: Miya Cech; Bryce Gheisar; Keith L. Williams; Kayden Grace Swan; Ben Daon
- Voices of: Paige Howard
- Composer: Adam Lastiwka
- Country of origin: United States
- Original language: English
- No. of seasons: 1
- No. of episodes: 9

Production
- Executive producers: Dean Israelite; Stephanie Sperber; Ron Howard; Brian Grazer; Daniel Knauf
- Producer: Jim O'Grady
- Cinematography: James McMillan
- Camera setup: Single-camera
- Running time: 22–23 minutes
- Production companies: Imagine Kids & Family; Nickelodeon Productions

Original release
- Network: Nickelodeon
- Release: November 13, 2020 – January 15, 2021

The Astronauts is an American action-adventure television series that aired on Nickelodeon from November 13, 2020 to January 15, 2021. The series stars Miya Cech, Bryce Gheisar, Keith L. Williams, Kayden Grace Swan, and Ben Daon, as well as features the voice of Paige Howard.

== Premise ==
Five children sneak onto a spaceship and the ship's artificial intelligence Matilda sends them into space. The children have to find their way back to Earth while doing a space mission and attempting to keep the spaceship from breaking down.

== Cast ==
- Miya Cech as Samantha "Samy" Sawyer-Wei, the commander of the Odyssey II crew and is the daughter of Rebecca Sawyer and Molly Wei
- Bryce Gheisar as Elliott Combs, the son of Griffin Combs and nephew of Singer Combs
- Keith L. Williams as Martin Taylor, the son of Niles Taylor and the older brother of Doria Taylor
- Kayden Grace Swan as Doria Taylor, the daughter of Niles Taylor and younger sibling of Martin Taylor
- Ben Daon as Will Rivers, the son of Connie Rivers
- Paige Howard as the voice of Matilda, the Odyssey II A.I. program who planned for the children's space launch and is the creation of Singer Combs

== Production ==
On June 18, 2019, it was announced that Imagine Kids & Family was developing an untitled scripted space series for Nickelodeon. Daniel Knauf served as showrunner, executive producer, and writer. Brian Grazer, Ron Howard, and Stephanie Sperber served as executive producers. Production for the series was overseen by Shauna Phelan. On February 19, 2020, an action-adventure single-camera television series under the working title of The Astronauts was ordered by Nickelodeon for 10 episodes, with an initial premiere set for summer 2020. On October 9, 2020, it was announced that the series would have an hour-long premiere on November 13, 2020. Starring in the series were Miya Cech as Samantha "Samy" Sawyer-Wei, Bryce Gheisar as Elliott Combs, Keith L. Williams as Martin Taylor, Kayden Grace Swan as Doria Taylor, Ben Daon as Will Rivers, and Paige Howard as the voice of Matilda. Daniel Knauf also served as series creator. Dean Israelite and Jonathan Frakes served as directors.

== Episodes ==
No.	Title	Directed by	Written by	Original release date	Prod. code	U.S. viewers (millions)
1	"Countdown" / "Day 1"	Dean Israelite	Daniel Knauf and Johnny Richardson	November 13, 2020	101–102	0.54
Three days before the launch of the rocket Odyssey II, in a hotel in Wellington, New Zealand, a group of kids were debating about the upcoming Odyssey II mission launch. Martin and Doria were asked to bring their dad, Niles, his spare key, which gives Elliott the idea to sneak into the launch pad for a little look. When the group manages to enter the spacecraft, they were greeted by Matilda, the ships primary AI interface. Suddenly, the door slammed shut and the launch sequence started out of nowhere. The ship blasted off with the five kids, Martin and Doria Taylor, William "Will" Rivers, Elliott Combes, and Samantha "Samy" Sawyer-Wei, inside. While ground control is trying to figure out what happened and who is hacking into Matilda, they advised the kids to disregard Matilda. Griffin Combes and Niles decided to contact the maker of Matilda, Singer Combes, all the while aboard the ship, Matilda reports an alarm. Samy decides to check it out and finds that the cargo loading were unfinished when the ship took off. The kids decided to fix the problem and manages to fix it just in time before Matilda detaches the outriggers. Note: This is a double-length special episode.
2	"Day 3"	Jonathan Frakes	May Chan	November 20, 2020	103	0.49
It is day 3 aboard the Odyssey II and ground control has made some ground rules for the kids aboard the ship, and one of them is a morning briefing and one-on-one private time with their families. Singer asks Samy to help him figure out what is going on with Matilda by asking her to ask some questions to Matilda. Elliott, on the other hand, was told by his father to take control and be the leader, and to keep an eye on Will, while Will's mom, Connie Rivers, asks Will to keep a look out on Elliott. This sparks some tension between the two. Samy then asks the questions to Matilda with the premise of a game called "may I ask", while Singer listens in on the conversation. Niles then confesses that the Matilda onboard the Odyssey II was a repurposed type 1 AI from a type 3 AI, and that the onboard Matilda was not hacked, but making its own decisions. Including to choose the kids and blast them on board the Odyssey II to finish the mission since according to her calculations, the kids have a higher chance of completing the mission. Doria, with Elliott's help uses the 3D printer aboard the ship to make a bracelet, she also made a rubber squid toy named "Squeebee McSqueeberton".
3	"Day 21"	Jonathan Frakes	Alex Ebel	November 27, 2020	104	0.46
The episode starts with Will and Elliott playing a game called "dookie derbie", where they race whose poop comes out the ship first. With Elliott unable to "do his business", he decided to flush Squeebe McSqueeberton, which then got stuck in the piping system. While Samy is convinced that they need to ask ground control for help, Elliott didn't want to get them involved. They finally decided to fix the problem and find Squeebee by themselves. After they succeeded on removing Squeebee from the pipes, it got stuck on the ships main engine. With a little ignition Squeebee finally got released into space. With that in mind, Samy thought that Matilda in some way is still the one that cared for them, like the Matilda back on earth, and that maybe they can somehow convince Matilda to turn around for their sake. Meanwhile back in ground control, Singer and Niles made a virus that specifically targets the Matilda on board Odyssey II. They plan to infect the cloud Matilda uses for computing resource to then infect the Matilda on board Odyssey II.
4	"Day 33"	Marcus Stokes	Johnny Richardson	December 4, 2020	105	0.43
The plan to infect Matilda with the virus is ready to be executed, with the help of Samy, they manage to bait Matilda to access the cloud that is infected with the virus. But when Samy asks Matilda to use the cloud, Matilda and the whole ship's power got shut down. The kids decided to find Matilda's brain and with the schematics of the ship they manage to find where her CPU is. Samy and Doria goes to check Matilda's CPU while the others find a way to keep them warm. Will then sees a weird cloud out in front of the ship, concerned, Samy then asks Doria to check what's going on. Samy searches Matilda's CPU room for any backup power or anything that might help them bring Matilda or the ships power back up, but she only sees a black wall with the label "MATILDA" on it, she got very frustrated and blames herself for what happened. Meanwhile, the ship flies through the electrical storm cloud, and manages to get through. Elliott came to check on Samy and comforts her, and she confesses the secret plan to infect Matilda with a virus to Elliott. After a while, Matilda and the ship then went back online, ground control then realizes that once Matilda detected the virus, she decides to shut down, hard booted herself and executes a protocol to air gap herself from the cloud, cutting off her connection to the cloud and anything on earth. Then the ship alarm went off. Samy asks Matilda what's going on but Matilda didn't answer, but as soon as Elliott calls Matilda, she answered that the ships greenhouse outrigger hull has been breached by a foreign object. Elliott had a heart-to-heart conversation with the other guys.
5	"Day 34"	Marcus Stokes	Yasemin Yilmaz	December 11, 2020	106	0.32
The story continues with the ship's alarming breach. With Matilda still ignoring Samy, the others has to keep calling Matilda every time Samy asks her something. With a micro-breach on the Greenhouse outrigger, the ship is losing oxygen. While the standard protocol dictates that a crew member needs to check the exterior fuselage, the parents back in mission control says to just seal off the outrigger and decrease their oxygen consumption. A day passed and when Samy tries to ask Matilda to bring up crew biometrics for the last 24 hours, she is still ignoring her. Samy said she understand why Matilda is upset, but Matilda then screams that Samy had taken away her body, her home, her everything. Samy then explains that that was how the kids feel, separated from their families and their homes. Matilda understands and reassures Samy that once the mission is complete, she will do everything in her power to ensure their safe return. The biometrics shows that oxygen consumption has in fact increase and Samy realizes that there's no other way than to fix the breach from the outside. Elliott retaliates and tries to step up and take control, declaring himself as the commander, the others scoff and says that if they were to vote on a commander, they'd pick Samy. Martin then trains on how to fix the fuselage from the outside and learns how to navigate the ship's exterior. When Samy tries to make the patch, it was revealed that Doria used up all the compound to make Squeebee. Thankfully a piece of Squeebee's tentacle was saved by Doria, but when Martin tries to patch the breach, he lost grip of the patch and it floats away from him, thankfully he manages to retrieve it and patched the ship. Samy then talks to Elliott that even though the others only trusts her and didn't take Elliott seriously, she needs Elliott to always speak up every time he thinks she's wrong. Elliott agrees.
6	"Day 73"	Marcus Stokes	Scott Gunnison Miller	December 18, 2020	107	0.57
It has been 73 days since the launch, and since the breach incident all the kids have been on each other's throats except Elliott. Elliott realizes this and seeks help from the instructional videos on board the Odyssey II, it tells that crew morale can and may very well be the hardest problem to fix and if left unchecked could be the most lethal of all the onboard issues. The video suggests to have the crew engage in a non-critical cooperative team building exercise. Elliott comes up with a plan to get everyone together and make a movie by distracting Will with a very cool video camera. At first the plan was working, Elliott manages to get everyone except Doria in on the plan. When they were shooting a scene, Doria walks in and ruins a shot. Elliott tries to fix it by saying it could work, but then the others start to bicker with each other, and Elliott gets on his last straw. Elliott then "explodes" and reveals how much of an idiot he is for hoping that if he could get everyone to do something fun that they will lighten up a little. While Elliott cools off, Matilda asks him the reason why the crew have been so uncooperative ever since the breach incident, this helps Elliott to cool off more and gave the others time to think clearly and apologize for their behavior and attitudes, and in the middle of all the talk, Doria tackles Elliott saying that they get to do stuff that only most kids can only dream about by saying "yeah, right, maybe we could make a movie about that". Finding a very good idea, the kids finally made the very idea into reality and sent it back to ground control. The video proves successful and raises morale of both the crew and ground control too. In the middle of the video Singer seems to realize something about Matilda.
7	"Day 76"	Dean Israelite	May Chan	January 1, 2021	108	0.31
The episode starts with Will hanging out with Matilda in her CPU room, Will seems to have become good friends with Matilda. Martin then calls him for breakfast, while Doria seems to be concerned about Samy's health conditions. While having breakfast the morning briefing starts and Lind, the flight director says "cheerio" which seems to be a code for Samy who then goes straight to her own quarters with Singer waiting for her. He has hatched a very intricate plan for the crew to take Matilda off the avionics system and let ground control take control. Their window was a 1 hour and 11 minutes at 02:00 AM where Matilda goes into debug mode where she is cut off from the Odyssey II shipboard functions. The plan was to deactivate Matilda and let the original crew pilot the Odyssey II from ground control. With the ship approaching Venus, the plan needs to be done by tonight. With the crew up at 02:00 AM and Matilda, which even thought her hands are tied, she is fully awake and aware of everything happening on board. The crew is going on with the plan while Matilda tries to stop everyone from continuing the plan. When Samy and Elliott got to Matilda's CPU room, Samy's condition starts getting worse and Matilda says that Samy has been experiencing low grade fever for the last 10 days and then Samy passed out. Molly, Samy's mother seems to have noticed this from the ways Samy winced and immediately goes and calls a dentist, and as it turns out she has a problem with her dental health and needs surgery. The dentist then helped Doria to perform a surgery with Martin assisting her, while Elliott and Will continues on with the plan. Will then enters Matilda's quantum chamber and continues to disregard Matilda and on the last step Matilda went back online and then shocked Will with an electric pulse. Matilda then regrets her actions and resuscitate Will and lets him continue the plan. With Matilda offline, the plan seems to have succeeded and the crew prepares to go back home to their families. Rebecca Sawyer, the original captain of the Odyssey II then tries to test control of the ship, which then failed because there seems to be a firewall guarding the ship. Ground control is devastated and with Matilda going offline, this means the only one capable of piloting the ship is the kids on board.
8	"Day 84"	Dean Israelite	Johnny Richardson	January 8, 2021	109	0.40
Since Matilda's shutdown, the crew have been doing simulations of the slingshot maneuver around Venus in hopes to be able to go back to Earth. So far none of the simulations have succeeded. With room for only 4 pilots, one of them will have to sit back, and Will got the short end of the straw. With 16 hours left on the clock, ground control decided that it's best for the crew to get some rest first. Unfortunately none of the kids can sleep and they decided to just continue with the simulations again and again. At some point Samy had had enough and stormed back to her cabin, Doria went to comfort her and tells her that sometimes it's best to let others feel needed and important. Samy felt better and joins the rest to go over the simulations again. Samy then fell asleep in the middle of the last simulation and Elliott wake her up to take her to a little picnic in the greenhouse outrigger. The kids ate and realized their rude behaviour towards each other, and Will apologizes for being the worst backseat driver explaining that "when you already watched a movie a million time, you can't help but yell at them". Samy then had a chat with her mother and she told her that she is capable of being a great commander, that she already has the skill, and she only need to really listen. After all the encouragement Samy received, she ordered everyone to stow their pads and only listen to Will as he shout out the instructions. This helps everyone cooperate and work smoothly with each other, and finally they entered Venusian orbit. While in orbit, they caught a glimpse of Kamohoali'i and decided to take a picture, which then turned out to not look anything like an asteroid and more like an alien craft. With the Odyssey II entering the escape window, they are ready to thrust away from Venus and back to Earth, but at the last minute Samy didn't turn on the thrusters and suddenly said "guys, we need to talk." Absent: Paige Howard as the voice of Matilda
9	"Day 85"	Dean Israelite	Daniel Knauf	January 15, 2021	110	0.44
The unexpected development turns out to be an alien vessel and the crew must decide if they should continue the mission or return to Earth. When they attempt to utilize the second escape window of Venus by utilizing a guidance provided by personnel from Earth, they end up in a dive headed toward the surface of Venus. The kids decide to reactivate Matilda in an attempt to escape the dive since they are unable to over-ride the coordinates that had been entered and the AI is their only hope in order to survive. After they are re-launched into space by Matilda, the kids tell it that it is one of them and they all decide to retrieve Kamohoali'i, even if it means putting the kids' lives at risk.

== Reception ==
=== Ratings ===
Viewership and ratings per season of The Astronauts
Season	Episodes	First aired		Last aired		Avg. viewers (millions)
Season	Episodes	Date	Viewers (millions)	Date	Viewers (millions)	Avg. viewers (millions)
1	9	November 13, 2020	0.54	January 15, 2021	0.44	0.44

=== Awards and nominations ===
Year	Award	Category	Nominee(s)	Result	Refs
2021	Writers Guild of America Awards	Children's Script – Episodic, Long form and Specials	Dan Knauf (for "Countdown")	Nominated	
2021	Daytime Creative Arts Emmy Awards	Outstanding Daytime Promotional Announcement	The Astronauts (for "The Astronauts Launch")	Nominated	
2021	Daytime Creative Arts Emmy Awards	Outstanding Casting for a Live-Action Children's Program	The Astronauts	Nominated	
2022	Kids' Choice Awards	Favorite Male TV Star (Kids)	Bryce Gheisar (Note: Also nominated for Are You Afraid of the Dark?.)	Nominated	
2022	Children's and Family Emmy Awards	Outstanding Children's or Family Viewing Series	The Astronauts	Nominated	
2022	Children's and Family Emmy Awards	Outstanding Sound Mixing and Sound Editing for a Live Action Program	various	Nominated	
