= Keith L. Williams =

American actor (born 2007)

- Born: Keith Leon Williams; May 21, 2007 (age 18); Fort Worth, Texas, U.S.
- Occupation: Actor
- Years active: 2012–present

Keith Leon Williams (born May 21, 2007) is an American actor. He is known for playing Barry in the 2022 film Secret Headquarters. He is also known for playing Lucas in the 2019 film Good Boys. On television, he is known for his work in the TV shows The Last Man on Earth and The Astronauts. Williams was born in Fort Worth, Texas. He attended Mary Jo Sheppard Elementary. As of November 2020, he resides in Mansfield, Texas and Los Angeles.

== Filmography ==
=== Film ===
Year	Title	Role	Notes
2014	Halloween video of the Selfie cast (Karen Gillan and John Cho dressed up as Power Rangers)	Green Ranger Keith	Video short
2016	Cora	Kevin	Short film
2017	Lemon	Ruben	
2017	The Bachelors	Annoying Kid	Uncredited
2018	Sadie	Francis	
2018	Moving On	Young Boy	Short film
2019	Good Boys	Lucas	
2019	Walmart: Big Day Back	Kid with Monster Jam shoes	Video short
2022	Secret Headquarters	Barry Berger	

=== Television ===
Year	Title	Role	Notes
2012	Blake Shelton's Not So Family Christmas	Kindergarten Kid	TV special
2014	Suburgatory	Miles	1 episode
2014	Selfie	Kevin	Recurring role
2015	Tosh.0	Kid	1 episode
2015	The Goldbergs	Kermit	1 episode
2017	Red Nose Day Actually	Himself	TV short
2016–2018	Teachers	Rodney	4 episodes
2017–2018	The Last Man on Earth	Jasper	Recurring role (seasons 3–4)
2018	Kidding	Jimmy	1 episode
2020	Home Movie: The Princess Bride	The Grandson	Miniseries; 1 episode
2020–2021	The Astronauts	Martin Taylor	Main cast
2022	The Tiny Chef Show	Himself	1 episode
