= Robbie Thompson =

Australian rules footballer (born 1967)

Personal information
- Full name: Robert Thompson
- Born: 22 October 1967 (age 59)
- Original team: Seacombe High
- Height: 182 cm (6 ft 0 in)
- Weight: 79 kg (174 lb)

Playing career^{1}
Years	Club	Games (Goals)
1987–1993	Glenelg	113 (5)
1991	Adelaide	5 (0)
- ^{1} Playing statistics correct to the end of 1991.

Robbie Thompson (born 22 October 1967) is a former professional Australian rules footballer who played for the Adelaide Football Club in the Australian Football League (AFL)

Thompson was recruited from Glenelg for Adelaide's inaugural AFL season in 1991.

He played in the first three games that the club played in the AFL and performed admirably on debut with 20 disposals against Hawthorn.

A half back flanker, he also played in rounds six and 20 before being delisted in the mid season draft in 1992.
