= The Invincible Iron Man =

(The) Invincible Iron Man may refer to:

- Iron Man, a Marvel Comics superhero
- The Invincible Iron Man (comics), a 2008 Marvel comic book series
- The Invincible Iron Man (video game), a 2002 video game
- The Invincible Iron Man (film), a 2007 animated film
- Invincible Iron Man, a 2016 Marvel comic book series

== See also ==
- Iron Man (disambiguation)
