= Agents of S.H.I.E.L.D. (comic book) =

Comic book series

- Cover to issue 2

Publication information
- Publisher: Marvel Comics
- Schedule: Monthly
- Format: Ongoing series
- Publication date: March — December 2016
- No. of issues: 10
- Main character: Phil Coulson

Creative team
- Written by: Marc Guggenheim
- Artist: Germán Peralta
- Penciller: Germán Peralta
- Inker: Germán Peralta
- Colorist: Rachelle Rosenberg
- Editor(s): Axel Alonso; Tom Brevoort; Katie Kubert; Alanna Smith

Agents of S.H.I.E.L.D. is a comic book Marvel Comics published as a digital ongoing series in 2016. It was created after the success of the television series of the same name. It is a sequel to S.H.I.E.L.D., the 2014 series. The series focuses on Agent Coulson, Agent May, Fitz, Simmons, Skye/Daisy, Deathlok and Mockingbird.

== Publication history ==
The series was launched as a direct sequel to the Mark Waid's 2014 series S.H.I.E.L.D., and just like its predecessor, it builds on the Television version of the characters. Unlike the 2014 series, it is more plot-driven rather than a standalone antholgy format.

The series has 10 issues, all published in 2016. The series was written by Marc Guggenheim and drawn by German Peralta. It has had two trade paperback collections published, Agents of S.H.I.E.L.D.: The Coulson Protocols, collecting issues #1-6, and Agents of S.H.I.E.L.D.: Under New Management, collecting issues #7-10. It has a Marvel Omnibus release, collecting all issues among others.

== Plot ==
The series focuses on Agent Phil Coulson, Agent Melinda May, Leo Fitz, Jemma Simmons, Skye/Daisy Johnson, Deathlok and Mockingbird.

== Reception ==
The series holds an average rating of 6.2 by 21 professional critics according to review aggregation website Comic Book Roundup. Jennifer Cheng of Comic Book Resources stated that the first issue doesn't add much yet to the franchise, but that it shows flashes of promise.

== Prints ==
=== Issues ===
Number	Title	Cover date	Comic Book Roundup rating
#1	Lola	March 2016	6.4 by 8 professional critics.
#2	Dangerous Liaisons	April 2016	—N/a
#3	Free Fall	May 2016	6.2 by 2 professional critics.
#4	Reversals of Fortune	June 2016	4.5 by 1 professional critic.
#5	Shanghaied	July 2016	6.6 by 1 professional critic.
#6	Unintended Consequences	August 2016	6.5 by 1 professional critic.
#7	Whose Side Are You On?	September 2016	6.5 by 1 professional critic.
#8	The Third Faction	October 2016	5.5 by 1 professional critic.
#9	Elektra, Agent of S.H.I.E.L.D.	November 2016	5.5 by 3 professional critics.
#10	End of the Line	December 2016	8.3 by 3 professional critics.

== Collected editions ==
Title [Tagline]	Material collected	Publication date	ISBN
Agents of S.H.I.E.L.D. Vol. 1: The Coulson Protocols	Agents of S.H.I.E.L.D. #1-6 and All-New, All-Different Point One #1	August 9, 2016	978-0785196280
Agents of S.H.I.E.L.D. Vol. 2: Under New Management	Agents of S.H.I.E.L.D. #7-10 and The Accused #1	December 14, 2016	978-0785196297
Agents of S.H.I.E.L.D. (Omnibus)	S.H.I.E.L.D. (2014) #1-12; Agents of S.H.I.E.L.D. #1-10; Agent Carter, Cavalry, Fury, Mockingbird, Quake: S.H.I.E.L.D. 50th Anniversary one-shots; Fury (2023) #1; material from All-New, All-Different Point One	April 1, 2026	Julian Totino Tedesco cover: 978-1302966591
Agents of S.H.I.E.L.D. (Omnibus)	S.H.I.E.L.D. (2014) #1-12; Agents of S.H.I.E.L.D. #1-10; Agent Carter, Cavalry, Fury, Mockingbird, Quake: S.H.I.E.L.D. 50th Anniversary one-shots; Fury (2023) #1; material from All-New, All-Different Point One	April 1, 2026	Mike Norton DM cover: 978-1302966607

== See also ==
- 2016 in comics
