= Bryce Gheisar =

American actor (born 2004)

- Born: December 22, 2004 (age 21); Plano, Texas, U.S.
- Occupation: Actor
- Years active: 2015–present

Bryce Gheisar (born December 22, 2004) is an American actor, best known for his leading roles as young Ethan in A Dog's Purpose and Julian in Wonder.

== Early life ==
Gheisar was born in Plano, Texas. He was involved in competitive gymnastics before discovering acting.

== Career ==
Gheisar started his acting career aged eight. His first role was in 2015 as Elijah Gutnick in the short film The Bus Stop. After he was enrolled in Cathryn Sullivan's school for Acting, he made his first theatrical appearance playing the leading role of young Ethan, in the acclaimed 2017 film, A Dog's Purpose. That same year, he gained more widespread recognition when portraying one of the lead roles, Julian, in the film Wonder, working alongside Jacob Tremblay, Millie Davis and Julia Roberts. He reprised the role in Wonder's 2024 spin-off sequel White Bird. From 2020 to 2021, Gheisar portrayed Elliot Combes in the Nickelodeon TV series, The Astronauts. Gheisar made his directorial debut in 2024 directing The Noise.

== Filmography ==
=== Film ===
Year	Title	Role	Notes
2017	A Dog's Purpose	Young Ethan Montgomery	
2017	Wonder	Julian Albans	
2017	Into the Who Knows!	Thomas	
2018	The 15:17 to Paris	Young Alek Skarlatos	
2024	The Noise		Director
2024	White Bird	Julian Albans	
2022	James the Second	James Buck	Short movie
2026	Little Brother	Cory Landy	

=== Television ===
Year	Title	Role	Notes
2016–2018	Walk the Prank	Herman	Main role
2019	9-1-1	Stevie	1 episode
2020–2021	The Astronauts	Elliot Combes	Main role
2021	Are You Afraid of the Dark?: Curse of the Shadows	Luke McCoy	Main role
