= List of Game of Thrones characters =

The characters from the medieval fantasy television series Game of Thrones are adapted from George R. R. Martin’s novel series A Song of Ice and Fire. Set in a fictional world composed of the continents of Westeros and Essos, the story follows political conflicts among noble houses, struggles for the Iron Throne, and the rising threat from the far North.

== Cast ==
=== Main cast ===
= Main cast (credited)
= Recurring cast (3+)
= Guest cast (1-2)

Actor	Character	Appearances							
Actor	Character	1	2	3	4	5	6	7	8
Sean Bean	Eddard "Ned" Stark	Main					Recurring (Note: In season six, Ned Stark is portrayed by recurring actors Sebastian Croft and Robert Aramayo in flashback scenes.)	Guest (Note: In season seven, Ned Stark is portrayed by guest actor Robert Aramayo in a flashback scene.)	
Mark Addy	Robert Baratheon	Main							
Nikolaj Coster-Waldau	Jaime Lannister	Main	Main	Main	Main	Main	Main	Main	Main
Michelle Fairley	Catelyn Stark	Main	Main	Main					
Lena Headey	Cersei Lannister	Main (Note: In season five, Cersei Lannister is also portrayed by guest actress Nell Williams in a flashback scene.)	Main	Main	Main	Main	Main	Main	Main
Emilia Clarke	Daenerys Targaryen	Main	Main	Main	Main	Main	Main	Main	Main
Iain Glen	Jorah Mormont	Main	Main	Main	Main	Main	Main	Main	Main
Harry Lloyd	Viserys Targaryen	Main							
Kit Harington	Jon Snow	Main	Main	Main	Main	Main	Main	Main	Main
Richard Madden	Robb Stark	Main	Main	Main					
Sophie Turner	Sansa Stark	Main	Main	Main	Main	Main	Main	Main	Main
Maisie Williams	Arya Stark	Main	Main	Main	Main	Main	Main	Main	Main
Alfie Allen	Theon Greyjoy	Main	Main	Main	Main	Main	Main	Main	Main
Isaac Hempstead Wright	Bran Stark	Main	Main	Main	Main		Main	Main	Main
Jack Gleeson	Joffrey Baratheon	Main	Main	Main	Main				
Rory McCann	Sandor "The Hound" Clegane	Main	Main	Main	Main		Main	Main	Main
Peter Dinklage	Tyrion Lannister	Main	Main	Main	Main	Main	Main	Main	Main
Jason Momoa	Khal Drogo	Also starring (Note: Jason Momoa only appears in one episode of season two, although credited as a main cast member.)	Also starring						
Aidan Gillen	Petyr "Littlefinger" Baelish	Main	Main	Main	Main	Main	Main	Main	
Liam Cunningham	Davos Seaworth		Main	Main	Main	Main	Main	Main	Main
John Bradley	Samwell Tarly	Recurring	Main	Main	Main	Main	Main	Main	Main
Stephen Dillane	Stannis Baratheon		Main	Main	Main	Main			
Carice van Houten	Melisandre		Main (Note: Carice van Houten only appears in one episode of season eight, although credited as a main cast member.)	Main	Main	Main	Main	Main	Main
James Cosmo	Jeor Mormont	Recurring	Main	Main					
Jerome Flynn	Bronn	Recurring	Main	Main	Main	Main	Main	Main	Main
Conleth Hill	Varys	Recurring	Main	Main	Main	Main	Main	Main	Main
Sibel Kekilli	Shae	Guest	Main	Main	Main				
Natalie Dormer	Margaery Tyrell		Main	Main	Main	Main	Main		
Charles Dance	Tywin Lannister	Recurring	Main (Note: Charles Dance only appears in one episode of season five, although credited as a main cast member.)	Main	Main	Main			
Oona Chaplin	Talisa Maegyr		Recurring	Main					
Rose Leslie	Ygritte		Recurring	Main	Main				
Joe Dempsie	Gendry	Guest	Recurring	Main				Main	Main
Kristofer Hivju	Tormund Giantsbane			Recurring	Main	Main	Main	Main	Main
Gwendoline Christie	Brienne of Tarth		Recurring	Recurring	Main	Main	Main	Main	Main
Iwan Rheon	Ramsay Bolton			Recurring	Main	Main	Main		
Hannah Murray	Gilly		Recurring	Recurring	Main	Main	Main	Main	Main
Michiel Huisman	Daario Naharis			Recurring (Note: In season three, Daario Naharis is portrayed by recurring actor Ed Skrein.)	Recurring	Main	Main		
Nathalie Emmanuel	Missandei			Recurring	Recurring	Main	Main	Main	Main
Dean-Charles Chapman	Tommen Baratheon	Recurring (Note: In seasons one and two, Tommen Baratheon is portrayed by recurring actor Callum Wharry.)	Recurring		Recurring	Main	Main		
Indira Varma	Ellaria Sand				Recurring	Main	Main	Main	
Tom Wlaschiha	Jaqen H'ghar	Body double	Recurring			Main	Main		
Michael McElhatton	Roose Bolton		Recurring	Recurring	Guest	Main	Main		
Jonathan Pryce	The High Sparrow					Recurring	Main		
Jacob Anderson	Grey Worm			Recurring	Recurring	Recurring	Recurring	Recurring	Main

=== Recurring cast ===
= Recurring cast (3+)
= Guest cast (1–2)

Actor	Character	Appearances							
Actor	Character	1	2	3	4	5	6	7	8
Donald Sumpter	Maester Luwin	Recurring	Recurring						
Jamie Sives	Jory Cassel	Recurring							
Ron Donachie	Rodrik Cassel	Recurring	Recurring				Guest (Note: In season six, Rodrik Cassel is portrayed by Fergus Leathem in flashback scenes.)		
Joseph Mawle	Benjen Stark	Recurring					Recurring (Note: In season six, Benjen Stark is also portrayed by Matteo Elezi in flashback scenes.)	Guest	
Dar Salim	Qotho	Recurring							
Esmé Bianco	Ros	Recurring	Recurring	Recurring					
Susan Brown	Septa Mordane	Recurring							
Art Parkinson	Rickon Stark	Recurring	Recurring	Recurring			Guest		
Nell Tiger Free	Myrcella Baratheon	Recurring (Note: In seasons one and two, Myrcella Baratheon is portrayed by Aimee Richardson.)	Recurring			Recurring	Guest		
Kristian Nairn	Hodor	Recurring	Recurring	Recurring	Recurring		Guest (Note: In season six, Hodor (originally named Wylis) is also portrayed by Sam Coleman in flashback scenes.)		
Roxanne McKee	Doreah	Recurring	Recurring						
Amrita Acharia	Irri	Recurring	Recurring						
Wilko Johnson	Ilyn Payne	Recurring	Guest						
Luke Barnes	Rast	Recurring		Recurring	Guest				
Owen Teale	Alliser Thorne	Recurring			Recurring	Recurring	Recurring		
Ian McElhinney	Barristan Selmy	Recurring		Recurring	Recurring	Recurring			
Francis Magee	Yoren	Recurring	Guest						
Julian Glover	Grand Maester Pycelle	Recurring	Recurring	Recurring	Recurring	Recurring	Recurring		
Gethin Anthony	Renly Baratheon	Recurring	Recurring						
Peter Vaughan	Maester Aemon	Recurring		Guest	Recurring	Recurring			
Miltos Yerolemou	Syrio Forel	Recurring							
Mark Stanley	Grenn	Recurring	Recurring	Recurring	Recurring				
Josef Altin	Pypar	Recurring		Guest	Recurring				
Elyes Gabel	Rakharo	Recurring	Guest						
Eugene Simon	Lancel Lannister	Recurring	Recurring			Recurring	Recurring		
Dominic Carter	Janos Slynt	Recurring	Guest		Recurring	Recurring			
Emun Elliott	Marillion	Recurring							
Kate Dickie	Lysa Arryn	Recurring			Guest				
Lino Facioli	Robin Arryn	Recurring			Recurring	Guest	Guest		Guest
Natalia Tena	Osha	Recurring	Recurring	Recurring			Guest		
Clive Mantle	Greatjon Umber	Recurring							
Mia Soteriou	Mirri Maz Duur	Recurring							
Ian Gelder	Kevan Lannister	Recurring	Guest			Recurring	Recurring		
Robert Pugh	Craster		Recurring	Guest					
Ben Crompton	Eddison Tollett		Recurring	Recurring	Recurring	Recurring	Recurring	Guest	Recurring
Ben Hawkey	Hot Pie	Guest	Recurring	Guest	Guest			Guest	
Eros Vlahos	Lommy Greenhands	Guest	Recurring						
Steven Cole	Kovarro		Recurring						
Kerr Logan	Matthos Seaworth		Recurring						
Tony Way	Dontos Hollard		Recurring		Recurring				
Karl Davies	Alton Lannister		Recurring						
Ian Beattie	Meryn Trant	Guest	Recurring	Guest	Recurring	Recurring			
Maisie Dee	Daisy		Recurring						
Andy Beckwith	Rorge	Body double	Recurring		Guest				
Gemma Whelan	Yara Greyjoy		Recurring	Guest	Guest		Recurring	Guest	Guest
Gerard Jordan	Biter	Body double	Recurring		Guest				
Daniel Portman	Podrick Payne		Recurring	Recurring	Recurring	Recurring	Recurring	Recurring	Recurring
Finn Jones	Loras Tyrell	Guest	Recurring	Recurring	Recurring	Recurring	Guest		
Fintan McKeown	Amory Lorch		Recurring						
Hafþór Júlíus Björnsson	Gregor "The Mountain" Clegane	Guest (Note: In season one, Gregor Clegane is portrayed by Conan Stevens.)	Recurring (Note: In season two, Gregor Clegane is portrayed by Ian Whyte.)		Recurring	Guest	Recurring	Recurring	Recurring
Nicholas Blane	The Spice King		Recurring						
Nonso Anozie	Xaro Xhoan Daxos		Recurring						
Ian Hanmore	Pyat Pree		Recurring						
Ralph Ineson	Dagmer Cleftjaw		Recurring						
Forbes KB	Black Lorren		Recurring						
Simon Armstrong	Qhorin Halfhand		Recurring						
Slavko Juraga	Silk King		Recurring						
Ciarán Hinds	Mance Rayder			Recurring	Guest	Guest			
Anton Lesser	Qyburn			Recurring	Guest	Recurring	Recurring	Recurring	Recurring
John Stahl	Rickard Karstark	Guest (Note: In season one, Rickard Karstark is portrayed by Steven Blount.)	Guest	Recurring					
Dan Hildebrand	Kraznys mo Nakloz			Recurring					
Diana Rigg	Olenna Tyrell			Recurring	Recurring	Guest	Recurring	Guest	
Mackenzie Crook	Orell			Recurring					
Paul Kaye	Thoros of Myr			Recurring			Guest	Recurring	
Noah Taylor	Locke			Recurring	Recurring				
Thomas Brodie-Sangster	Jojen Reed			Recurring	Recurring				
Ellie Kendrick	Meera Reed			Recurring	Recurring		Recurring	Recurring	
Philip McGinley	Anguy			Recurring					
Clive Russell	Brynden Tully			Recurring			Guest		
Tobias Menzies	Edmure Tully			Recurring			Recurring		Guest
William & James Wilson	Little Sam			Recurring (Note: In seasons three to five, Little Sam is portrayed by uncredited infant extras.)	Recurring	Recurring	Recurring	Recurring	Guest
Richard Dormer	Beric Dondarrion	Guest (Note: In season one, Beric Dondarrion is portrayed by David Michael Scott.)		Recurring			Guest	Recurring	Recurring
Jamie Michie	Steelshanks Walton			Recurring					
Pedro Pascal	Oberyn Martell				Recurring				
Yuri Kolokolnikov	Styr				Recurring				
Joseph Gatt	Thenn Warg				Recurring				
Brian Fortune	Othell Yarwyck	Guest			Recurring	Recurring	Recurring		
Tara Fitzgerald	Selyse Florent		Guest (Note: In season two, Selyse Florent is portrayed by uncredited extra Sarah MacKeever.)	Guest	Recurring	Recurring			
Roger Ashton-Griffiths	Mace Tyrell				Recurring	Recurring	Recurring		
Kerry Ingram	Shireen Baratheon			Guest	Recurring	Recurring			
Paul Bentley	The High Septon			Guest	Recurring	Guest			
Brenock O'Connor	Olly				Recurring	Recurring	Recurring		
Joel Fry	Hizdahr zo Loraq				Guest	Recurring			
Will Tudor	Olyvar			Guest	Guest	Recurring			
Michael Condron	Bowen Marsh					Recurring	Recurring		
Alexander Siddig	Doran Martell					Recurring	Guest		
DeObia Oparei	Areo Hotah					Recurring	Guest		
Toby Sebastian	Trystane Martell					Recurring	Guest		
Faye Marsay	The Waif					Recurring	Recurring		
Charlotte Hope	Myranda			Guest	Guest	Recurring	Guest		
Elizabeth Webster	Walda Bolton				Guest	Recurring	Guest		
Keisha Castle-Hughes	Obara Sand					Recurring	Guest	Guest	
Rosabell Laurenti Sellers	Tyene Sand					Recurring	Guest	Guest	
Jessica Henwick	Nymeria Sand					Recurring	Guest	Guest	
Hannah Waddingham	Septa Unella					Recurring	Recurring		
Joe Naufahu	Khal Moro						Recurring		
Staz Nair	Qhono						Recurring	Recurring	Recurring
Max von Sydow	Three-Eyed Raven				Guest (Note: In season four, the Three-Eyed Raven is portrayed by Struan Rodger.)		Recurring		
Ian Whyte	Wun Weg Wun Dar Wun					Guest	Recurring		
Kae Alexander	Leaf				Guest (Note: In season four, Leaf is portrayed by Octavia Alexandru.)		Recurring		
Paul Rattray	Harald Karstark						Recurring		
Richard E. Grant	Izembaro						Recurring		
Essie Davis	Lady Crane						Recurring		
Leigh Gill	Bobono						Recurring		
Rob Callender	Clarenzo						Recurring		
Tim Plester	Black Walder Rivers			Guest			Recurring		
Daniel Tuite	Lothar Frey			Guest (Note: In season three, Lothar Frey is portrayed by Tom Brooke.)			Recurring		
Bella Ramsey	Lyanna Mormont						Recurring	Guest	Recurring
Jim Broadbent	Archmaester Ebrose							Recurring	
Pilou Asbæk	Euron Greyjoy						Guest	Recurring	Recurring
Tim McInnerny	Robett Glover						Guest	Recurring	
Rupert Vansittart	Yohn Royce				Guest	Guest	Guest	Recurring	Recurring
Richard Rycroft	Maester Wolkan						Guest	Recurring	Recurring
James Faulkner	Randyll Tarly						Guest	Recurring	
Tom Hopper	Dickon Tarly						Guest (Note: In season six, Dickon Tarly is portrayed by Freddie Stroma.)	Recurring	
Brendan Cowell	Harrag							Recurring	
Vladimir Furdik	Night King				Guest (Note: In seasons four and five, the Night King is portrayed by Richard Brake.)	Guest	Guest	Recurring	Guest
Megan Parkinson	Alys Karstark							Guest	Recurring

=== Guest cast ===
Introduced in season 1

- Dennis McKeever as a Night's Watch officer (season 1)
- David Bradley as Walder Frey (seasons 1, 3, 6–7)
- Andrew Wilde as Tobho Mott (seasons 1–2)
- Roger Allam as Illyrio Mopatis (season 1)
- Jefferson Hall as Hugh of the Vale (season 1)
- Margaret John as Old Nan (season 1)
- Mark Lewis Jones as Shagga (season 1)
- Bronson Webb as Will (season 1)
- Rob Ostlere as Waymar Royce (season 1)
- Dermot Keaney as Gared (season 1)
- John Standing as Jon Arryn (season 1)
- Rhodri Hosking as Mycah (season 1)
- Tobias Winter as Timmet (seasons 1–2)
- Natilda Lee as Chella (seasons 1–2)
- Matthew Scurfield as Vayon Poole (season 1)
- Elizabeth Barrett as Maege Mormont (season 1)
- Colin Carnegie as Stevron Frey (season 1)
- Kelly Long as Joyeuse Frey (seasons 1, 3)
- Vinnie McCabe as Leo Lefford (season 1)
- B.J. Hogg as Addam Marbrand (season 1)
- Gerry O’Brien as Jonas Bracken (season 1)
- Antonia Christophers as Mhaegen (seasons 1–2)
- Sahara Knite as Armeca (seasons 1–2)

Introduced in season 2

- Josephine Gillan as Marei (seasons 2–6, 8)
- Sara Dylan as Bernadette (seasons 2–4, 6–7)
- Patrick Malahide as Balon Greyjoy (seasons 2–3, 6)
- Edward Dogliani (seasons 2–3) and Ross O'Hennessy (season 5) as the Lord of Bones
- Lucian Msamati as Salladhor Saan (seasons 2–4)
- Andy Kellegher as Polliver (seasons 2, 4)
- Roy Dotrice as Hallyne (season 2)
- Oliver Ford Davies as Maester Cressen (season 2)
- David Coakley as Drennan (season 2)
- Peter Ballance as Farlen (season 2)
- Paul Caddell as Jacks (season 2)
- Aidan Crowe as Quent (season 2)
- Tyrone McElhennon as Torrhen Karstark (season 2)
- Anthony Morris as the Tickler (season 2)
- Laura Pradelska as Quaithe (season 2)
- David Fynn as Rennick (season 2)

Introduced in season 3

- Burn Gorman as Karl Tanner (seasons 3–4)
- Christopher Newman as Hoster Tully (season 3)
- Dean-Charles Chapman as Martyn Lannister (season 3)
- Timothy Gibbons as Willem Lannister (season 3)
- Alexandra Dowling as Roslin Tully (season 3)
- Mark Killeen as Mero (season 3)
- Ramon Tikaram as Prendahl na Ghezn (season 3)
- Will O'Connell as Todder (seasons 3, 5)
- Pixie Le Knot as Kayla (seasons 3–4)
- Clifford Barry as Greizhen mo Ullhor (season 3)
- George Georgiou as Razdal mo Eraz (seasons 3, 6)

Introduced in season 4

- Mark Gatiss as Tycho Nestoris (seasons 4–5, 7)
- Reece Noi as Mossador (seasons 4–5)
- Gary Oliver as Ternesio Terys (seasons 4–5)
- Jazzy de Lisser as Tansy (season 4)
- Lu Corfield as the Mole's Town madam (season 4)
- Lois Winstone as a Mole's Town prostitute (season 4)
- Alisdair Simpson as Donnel Waynwood (season 4)
- Paola Dionisotti as Anya Waynwood (season 4)
- Deirdre Monaghan as Morag (season 4)
- Jane McGrath as Sissy (season 4)
- Sarine Sofair as Lhara (seasons 4–5)

Introduced in season 5

- Enzo Cilenti as Yezzan zo Qaggaz (seasons 5–6)
- Murray McArthur as Dim Dalba (seasons 5–6)
- Andrew McClay as Aberdolf Strongbeard (seasons 5–8)
- Adewale Akinnuoye-Agbaje as Malko (season 5)
- Birgitte Hjort Sørensen as Karsi (season 5)
- Zahary Baharov as Loboda (season 5)
- J. J. Murphy as Denys Mallister (season 5)
- Ali Lyons as Johnna (season 5)
- Oengus MacNamara as Thin man (season 5)
- Hattie Gotobed as Ghita (season 5)
- Meena Rayann as Vala (seasons 5–6)

Introduced in season 6

- Lucy Hayes as Kitty Frey (seasons 6–7)
- Dean S. Jagger as Smalljon Umber (season 6)
- Michael Feast as Aeron Greyjoy (season 6)
- Kevin Eldon as Camello (season 6)
- Eline Powell as Bianca (season 6)
- Gerald Lepkowski as Zanrush (season 6)
- Souad Faress as High Priestess of the Dosh Khaleen (season 6)
- Jóhannes Haukur Jóhannesson as Lem Lemoncloak (season 6)
- Sean Blowers as Wyman Manderly (season 6)
- Tom Varey as Cley Cerwyn (season 6)
- Samantha Spiro as Melessa Tarly (season 6)
- Rebecca Benson as Talla Tarly (season 6)
- Ania Bukstein as Kinvara (season 6)
- Ian McShane as Brother Ray (season 6)
- Ricky Champ as Gatins (season 6)
- Ian Davies as Morgan (season 6)
- Nathanael Saleh as Arthur (season 6)
- Annette Hannah as Frances (season 6)
- Eddie Jackson as Belicho Paenymion (season 6)
- Andrei Claude as Khal Rhalko (season 6)
- Tamer Hassan as Khal Forzho (season 6)
- Chuku Modu as Aggo (season 6)
- Deon Lee-Williams as Iggo (season 6)
- Hannah John-Kamen as Ornela (season 6)

Introduced in season 7

- Harry Grasby as Ned Umber (season 7–8)

Introduced in season 8

- Marc Rissmann as Harry Strickland (season 8)
- Seamus O’Hara as Fergus (season 8)
- Bea Glancy as Teela (season 8)
- Bronte Carmichael as Martha (season 8)
- Laura Elphinstone as Nora (season 8)
- Toby Osmund as the Prince of Dorne (season 8)

Non-human characters cast

- Ian Whyte as various White Walkers (seasons 1–2), the giant Dongo the Doomed (seasons 3–4) and a giant wight (season 7–8)
- Spencer Wilding as a White Walker (season 1)
- Ross Mullan as various White Walkers (seasons 2–4)
- Neil Fingleton as the giant Mag Mar Tun Doh Weg (season 4) and a giant wight (season 7)
- Tim Loane as a White Walker (season 5)

Flashbacks cast

- Jodhi May as Maggy the Frog (season 5)
- Nell Williams as young Cersei Lannister (season 5)
- Isabella Steinbarth as Melara Hetherspoon (season 5)
- Sebastian Croft as child Eddard Stark (season 6)
- Matteo Elezi as child Benjen Stark (season 6)
- Cordelia Hill as child Lyanna Stark (season 6)
- Sam Coleman as young Wylis / Hodor (season 6)
- Annette Tierney as young Old Nan (season 6)
- Fergus Leathem as young Rodrik Cassel (season 6)
- Robert Aramayo as young Eddard Stark (seasons 6–7)
- Luke Roberts as Arthur Dayne (season 6)
- Eddie Eyre as Gerold Hightower (season 6)
- Leo Woodruff as young Howland Reed (season 6)
- Wayne Foskett as Rickard Stark (season 6)
- David Rintoul as Aerys 'The Mad King' Targaryen (season 6)
- Aisling Franciosi as Lyanna Stark (seasons 6–7)
- Wilf Scolding as Rhaegar Targaryen (season 7)
- Tom Chadbon as High Septon Maynard (season 7)

== Main characters ==
=== Eddard "Ned" Stark ===
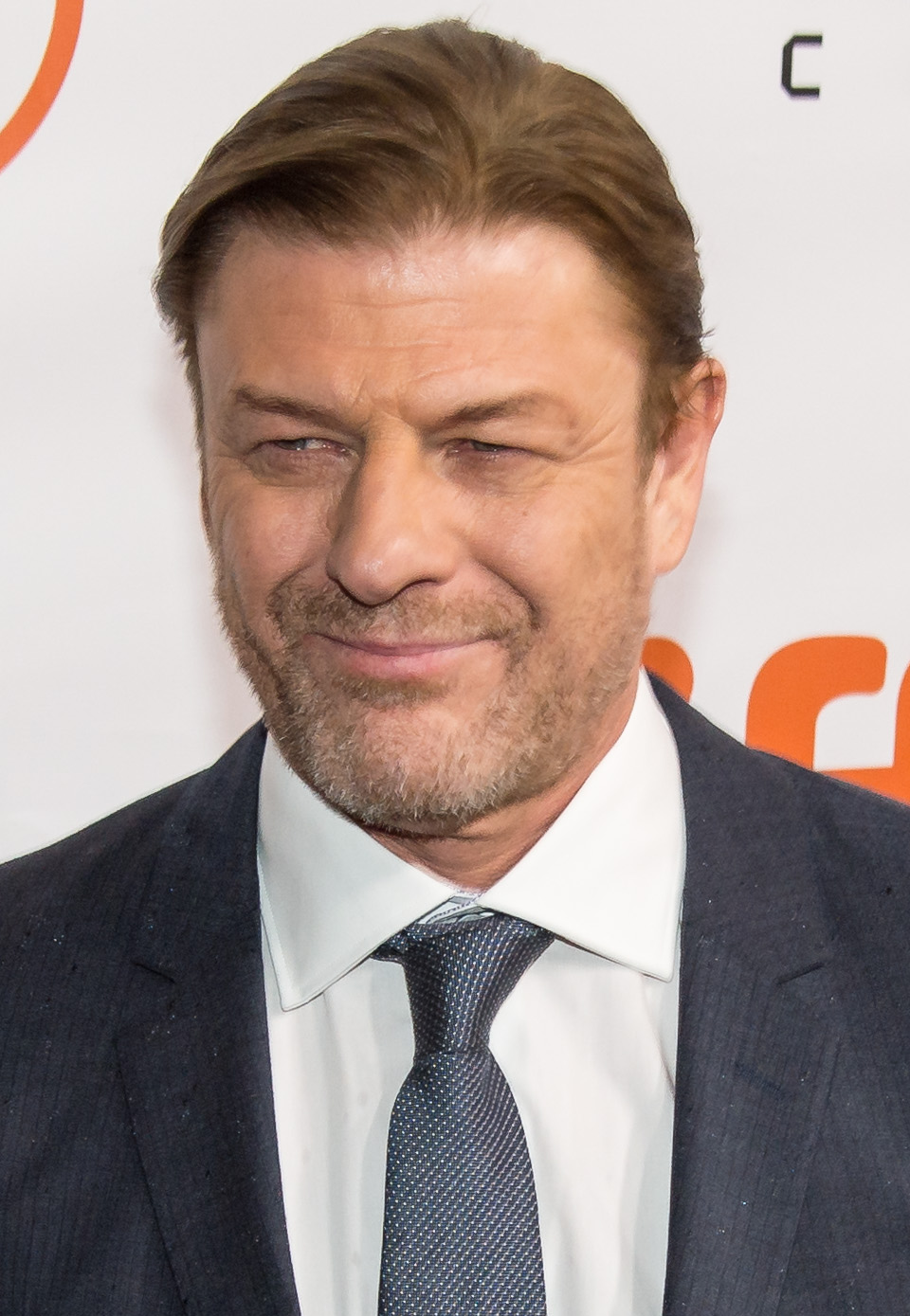
Sean Bean

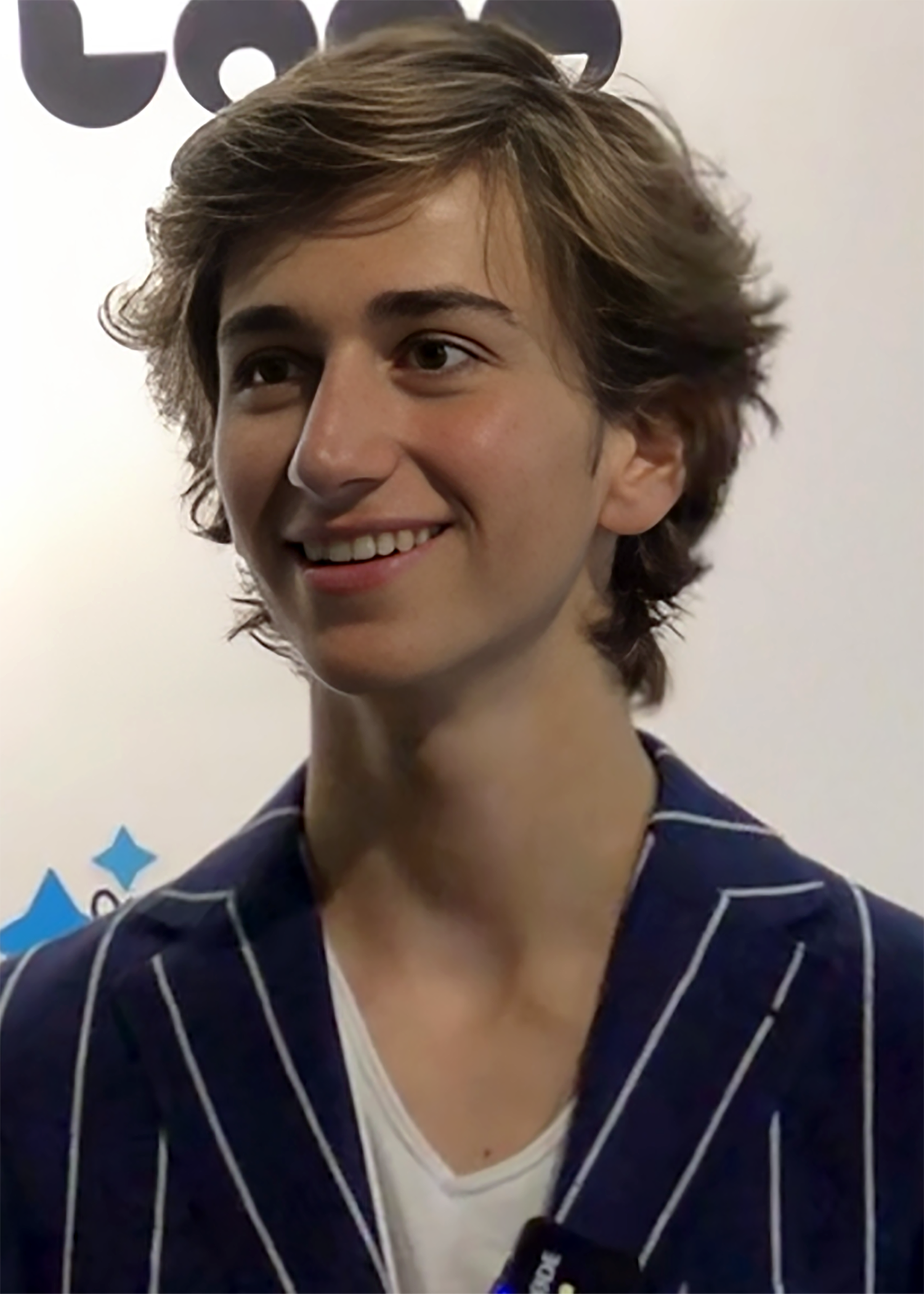
Sebastian Croft

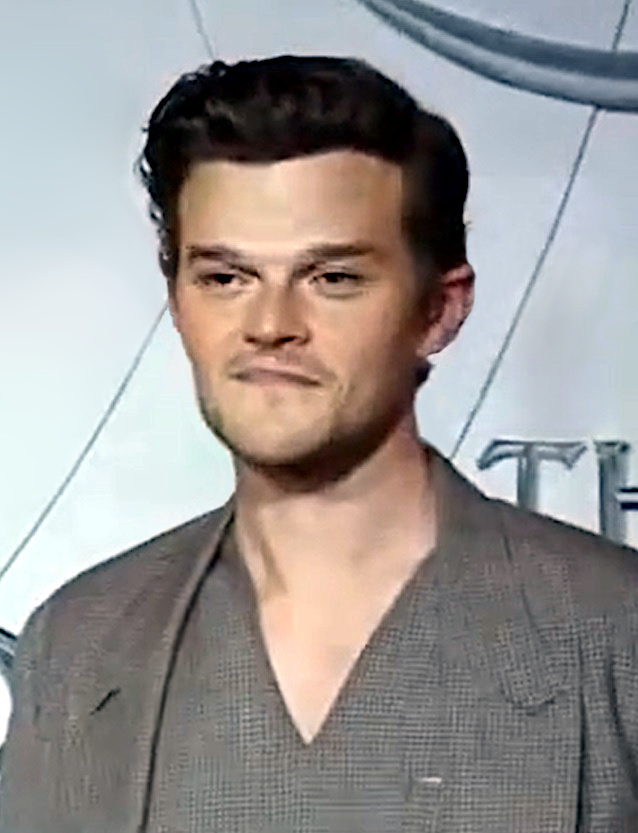
Robert Aramayo

Ned Stark (portrayed by Sean Bean as an adult, Sebastian Croft as a child, and Robert Aramayo as a young adult) is the Hand of the King after Lord Jon Arryn's death. He is known for his sense of honor and justice. He took part in Robert's Rebellion after his sister, Lyanna, was kidnapped by Crown Prince Rhaegar Targaryen. When Ned's father and brother went south to reclaim her, "Mad King" Aerys Targaryen burned both of them alive. Ned and Robert Baratheon led the rebellion to unseat him from the throne. As the show opens, Ned has been content to remain in the North, but after the death of Lord Jon Arryn, he is convinced that it is his duty to accept the position of Hand of the King. Ned is not interested in politics and prefers to rule with honor and follow the law. While investigating the reason for the death of Jon Arryn, he discovers that all three of Robert's children with Queen Cersei Lannister were fathered by Cersei's twin brother, Jaime. When Ned confronts Cersei about the truth, she has him imprisoned for treason after he publicly denounces Joffrey. Ned is convinced by Varys that if he goes to his death honorably, as he is prepared to do, his daughters will not suffer for it. To protect them, he sacrifices his honor and publicly declares that he was plotting to steal the throne and that Joffrey is the true king. Despite Cersei's promise that Ned would be allowed to join the Night's Watch in exile, Joffrey orders Ned's execution for his own amusement and later torments Sansa Stark by forcing her to look at her father's head. His bones are later returned to Catelyn Stark in the Stormlands by Petyr Baelish, who laments Ned's downfall and that he was too honorable to seize power through force, rather insisting the throne pass to Lord Stannis Baratheon, Robert's younger brother. Baelish's preferred course of action, revealed only to Ned, had been to seize Cersei and her children first and rule in Joffrey's name as Regent and Lord Protector. Ned's sacrifice is not in vain, since his notifying Stannis of the truth of Joffrey's parentage sets in motion Stannis's claim to the throne and ensures the illegitimacy is made known to all of Westeros. Renly Baratheon, however, separately lays a claim with the support of mighty House Tyrell. Ned's actions thus set into motion the War of Five Kings against House Lannister and the Iron Throne.

=== Robert Baratheon ===
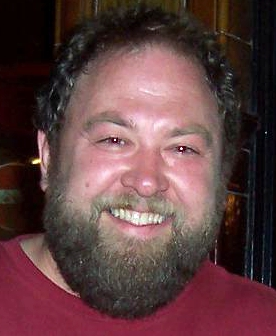
Mark Addy

Robert Baratheon (portrayed by Mark Addy) became the King of the Seven Kingdoms after leading a rebellion against Aerys II Targaryen. He was betrothed to Ned Stark's sister, Lyanna, and loved her deeply, but she was kidnapped by Rhaegar Targaryen. Her father and another brother were killed when they went to King's Landing to reclaim her, which led to Robert and Ned Stark's revolt, known as Robert's Rebellion, after which the Targaryens were slaughtered or driven from the Kingdoms. Since Robert's family had closer ties to the former royal family, he was put on the Iron Throne. Now, Robert has grown fat and miserable; he has no more wars to fight, is surrounded by plotters and sycophants, hates and is bored by the constant work needed to manage the Kingdoms properly, and is trapped in a political marriage to the scheming Cersei Lannister, whom he has never loved. He is unaware that none of his three children with Cersei are his, but instead Jaime Lannister's. Under his reign, the realm has been bankrupted, and Robert is deeply in debt to his wife's family. Mortally wounded while hunting, he unknowingly leaves no rightful heir behind. His bastards are ordered dead by Joffrey, many of whom are killed, and Gendry is subsequently forced to flee the capital.

=== Jaime Lannister ===
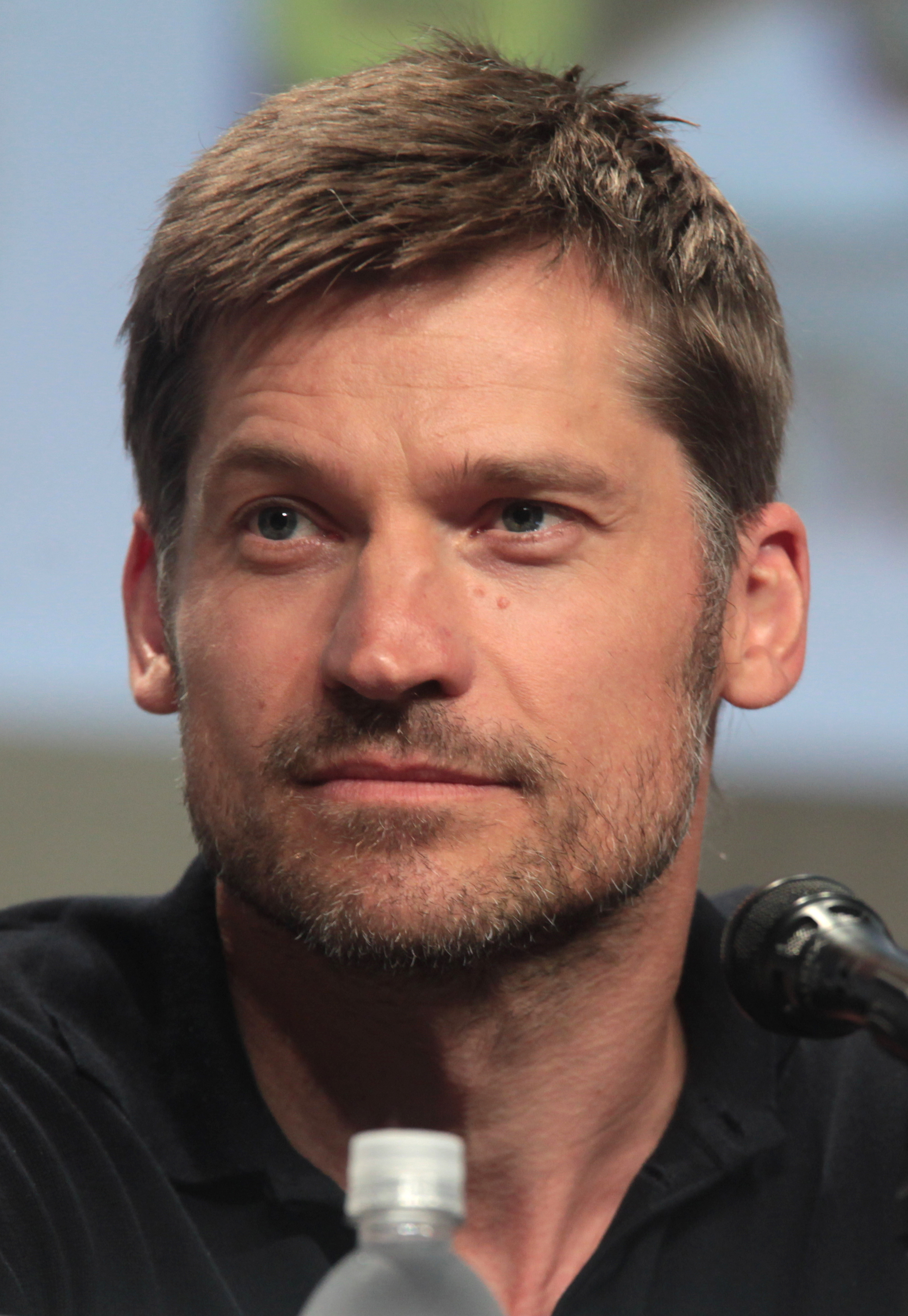
Nikolaj Coster-Waldau

Jaime Lannister (portrayed by Nikolaj Coster-Waldau) is a member of the Kingsguard and an exceptionally skilled swordsman. He is Cersei Lannister's twin brother and has carried on an incestuous love affair with her all his life, fathering all three of her living children. He is nicknamed "Kingslayer" for killing the previous king, Aerys II, whom he was sworn to protect. Jaime is captured by Robb Stark's army and held prisoner until he is released by Catelyn Stark and escorted back to King's Landing by Brienne of Tarth. On the road, his sword hand is severed, and he reveals that he killed Aerys II to save the population of King's Landing, whom Aerys II was attempting to massacre with wildfire. Upon his return to King's Landing, he retakes his place in the Kingsguard and restarts his affair with Cersei. He travels to Dorne to rescue their daughter, Myrcella Baratheon, but cannot prevent her from being poisoned. After the Faith Militant gain control of the capital, Jaime is relieved of his Kingsguard duties and told to reclaim Riverrun with the Lannister army. Jaime is present at Cersei's crowning following their last child Tommen's suicide but is later ambushed by Daenerys Targaryen, who has come to Westeros to stake a claim to the Iron Throne. After reuniting with Brienne and joining the effort to defeat the White Walkers, he returns to King's Landing to rescue Cersei from Daenerys's forces. The Lannister siblings die together when Daenerys's dragon, Drogon, destroys the Red Keep.

=== Catelyn Stark ===
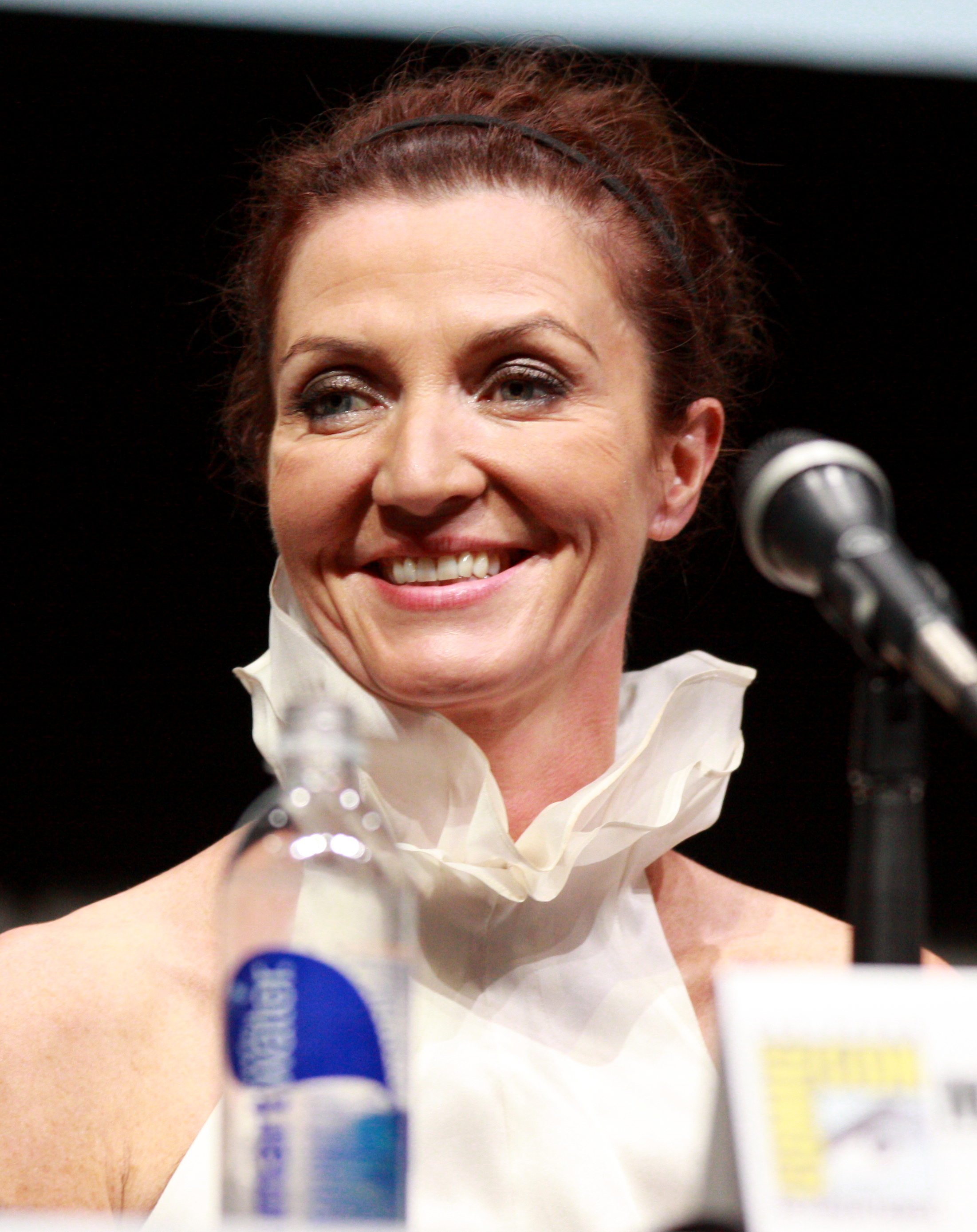
Michelle Fairley

Catelyn Stark (portrayed by Michelle Fairley) is the wife of Lord Eddard Stark. She is also the elder sister of Lysa Arryn, the lady of the Vale and mistress of the Eyrie, and Lord Edmure Tully, the lord of Riverrun. Catelyn is the first to suspect that the Lannisters made an attempt on her son Brandon's life and arrests Tyrion Lannister to bring him to the Eyrie for trial. After Tyrion is released and after Eddard is executed, Catelyn joins her son Robb's campaign to rescue Sansa and Arya and defeat the Lannisters. She releases Robb's prisoner, Jaime Lannister, on the condition that he return Sansa and Arya home to Winterfell upon his return to King's Landing. She warns Robb against marrying Talisa Maegyr, which would break a marriage pact he formed with Walder Frey, but is powerless to stop him. Catelyn is killed, along with Robb and Talisa and many Stark loyalists, at the Red Wedding, when Walder Frey—supported by the Boltons and the Lannisters—turns on the Starks for breaking the marriage pact.

=== Cersei Lannister ===
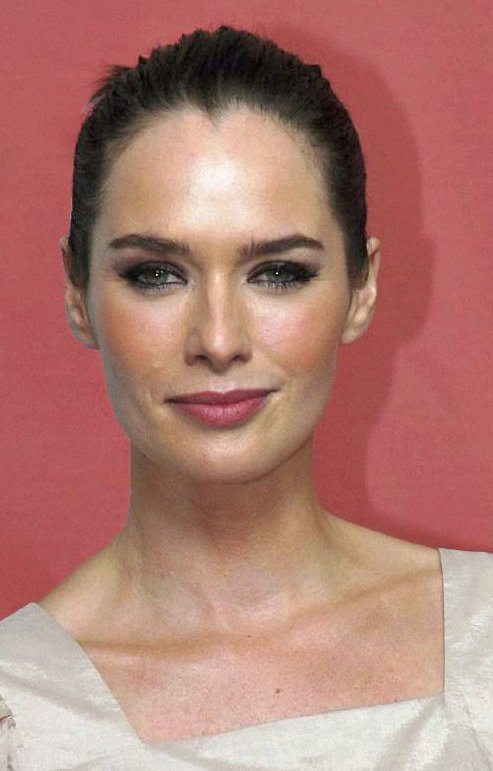
Lena Headey

Cersei Lannister (portrayed by Lena Headey as an adult and Nell Williams as a child) is the wife of King Robert Baratheon and queen consort of Westeros. Cersei has a twin brother, Jaime, with whom she has been involved in an incestuous affair from early childhood. All three of Cersei's children are Jaime's. Cersei has a strong desire for power. When she learns that King Robert may be about to discover her affair with Jaime, she arranges for him to be killed and is present when Eddard "Ned" Stark is executed. With her son Joffrey on the throne, she becomes one of his closest advisers and battles with his eventual wife Margaery Tyrell for his affections. When Joffrey is poisoned and her brother Tyrion is framed for the murder, she becomes determined to see Tyrion executed. Tyrion, however, murders their father, Tywin, and flees King's Landing. With her youngest son, Tommen, now on the throne and married to Margaery, she seeks the help of the Faith Militant and their leader, the High Sparrow, to regain control. However, her plans backfire, and she is imprisoned herself by the Sparrows when they learn of her incestuous affairs with Jaime Lannister and Lancel Lannister. After being forced to walk naked through the streets as punishment, she annihilates the Sept of Baelor with wildfire, wiping out the High Sparrow and the Tyrells, and is crowned queen following Tommen's suicide. When Daenerys Targaryen comes to Westeros and challenges her claim, Cersei uses the Great War against the White Walkers as an opportunity to strengthen her forces against Daenerys's depleted armies. She is defeated by Daenerys and her dragon and killed during the destruction of King's Landing.

=== Daenerys Targaryen ===
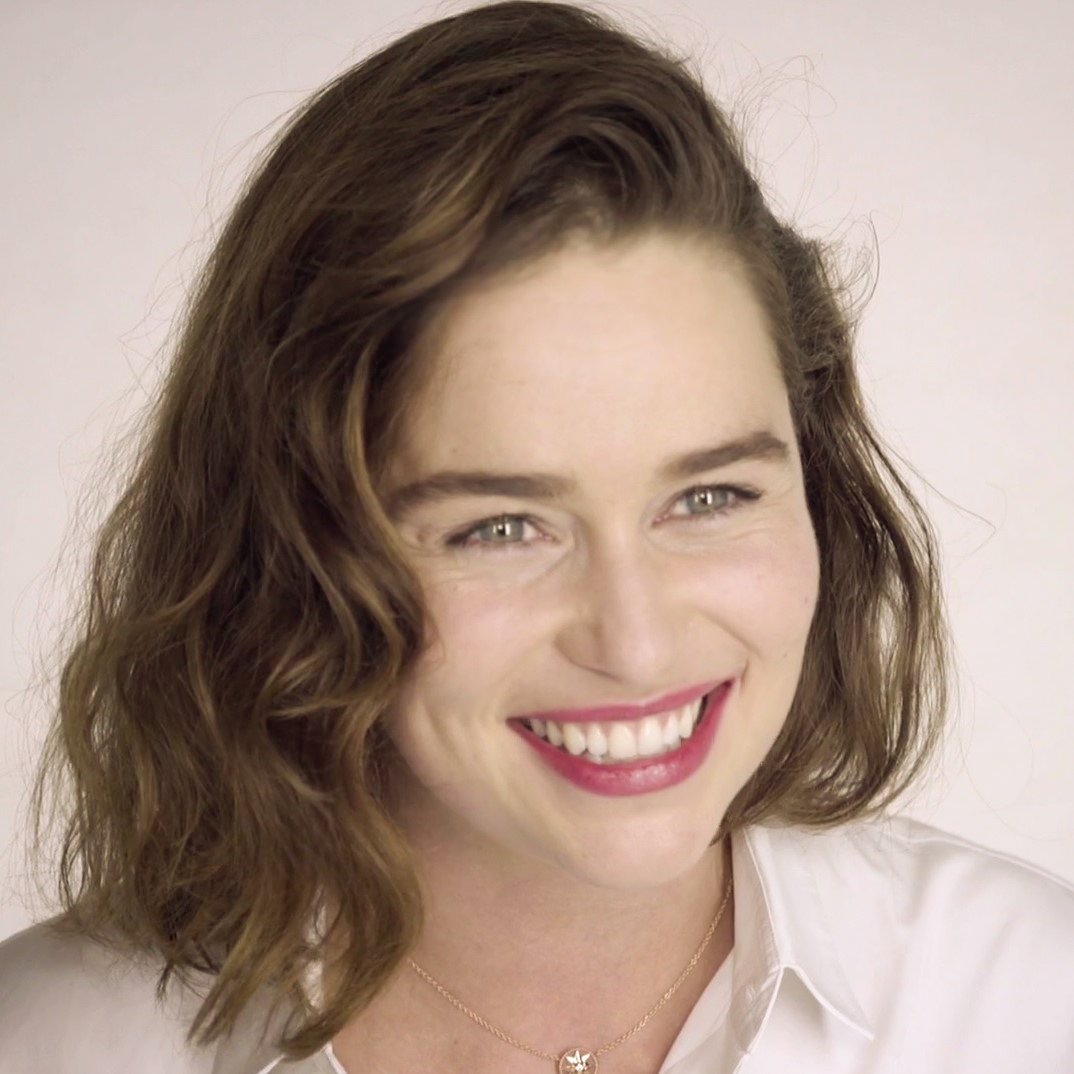
Emilia Clarke

Daenerys Targaryen (portrayed by Emilia Clarke) is the exiled princess of the Targaryen dynasty. She and her brother, Viserys, were smuggled to Essos towards the end of Robert's rebellion. For seventeen years, she has traveled throughout Essos alongside her abusive brother, until they were under the custody of Illyrio Mopatis in Pentos. In exchange for an army, Viserys marries her to the powerful Dothraki warlord Khal Drogo, who gifts her three petrified dragon eggs. When Drogo dies from an infected wound in a fight, Daenerys walks into his burning funeral pyre, birthing three dragons. She later liberates the slaves along Slaver's Bay, ruling over the city of Meereen with her Unsullied army, and eventually defeating the slave masters with her dragons. She then leaves Slaver's Bay for Westeros, in a bid to reclaim her birthright: the Iron Throne. Upon her arrival in Westeros, she meets with Jon Snow, the King-in-the-North, who convinces her to defeat the White Walkers before pressing her claim to the throne. The pair soon fall in love. In Westeros, she loses numerous friends, allies, and two of her dragons in battle, Viserion killed by the Night King and Rhaegal by Cersei Lannister's forces. Overwhelmed by the grave losses she underwent and left with no option but to rule through fear, she uses her last dragon, Drogon, to burn an already surrendered King's Landing and take the Iron Throne by force. She then declares in her speech to her Dothraki and Unsullied that they are not going to end the war, but continue to conquer and liberate the rest of the known world, in the same way she liberated King's Landing. Out of duty, a heartbroken Jon is then forced to kill Daenerys to prevent the world from meeting the same fate as the city she had reduced to ashes. A grieving Drogon then proceeds to melt the Iron Throne with dragonfire, before taking Daenerys into his claws and flying away from the Red Keep to the east.

=== Jorah Mormont ===
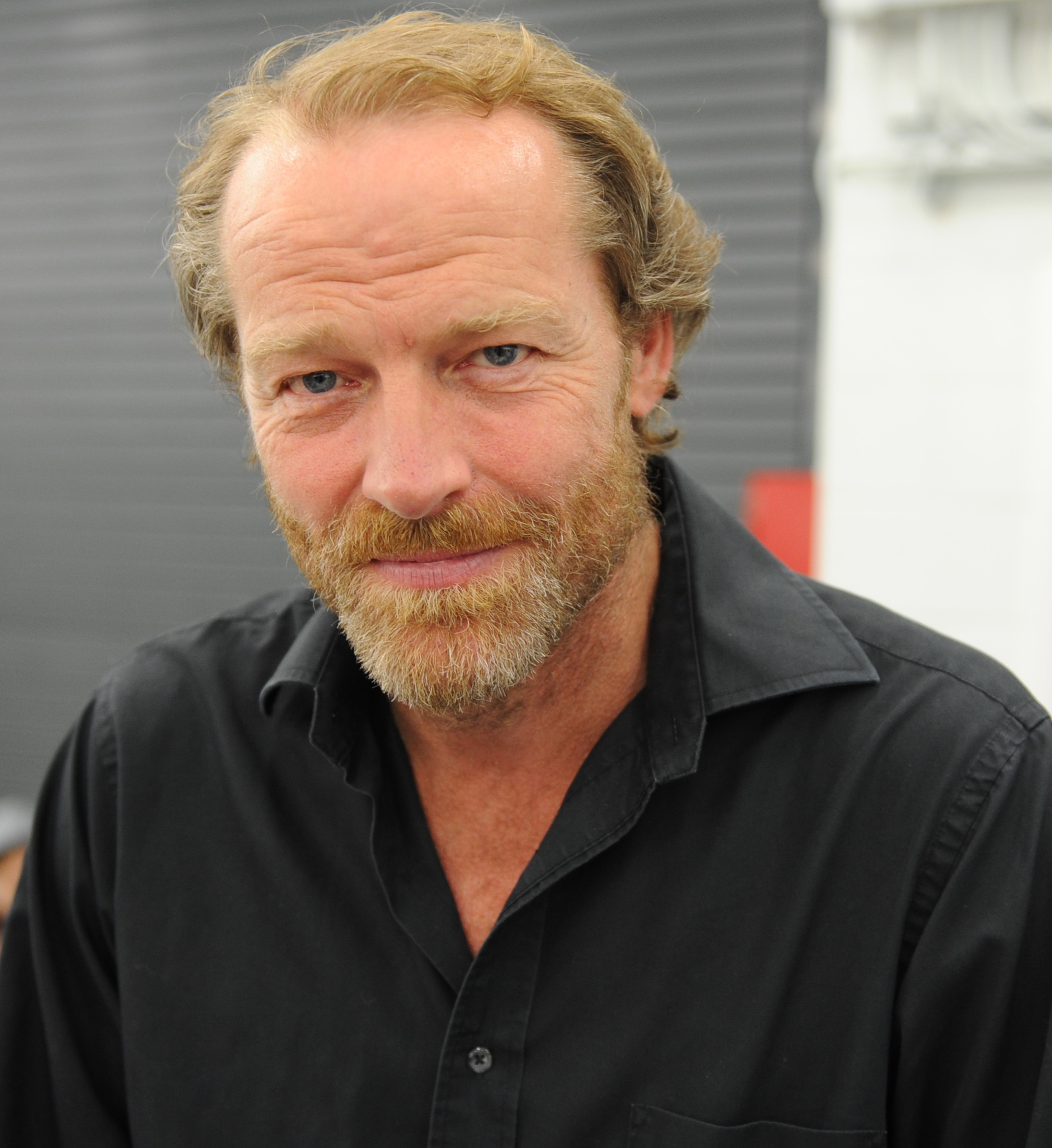
Iain Glen

Jorah Mormont (portrayed by Iain Glen) is an exiled knight in the service of Daenerys Targaryen and the son of Jeor Mormont of the Night's Watch. Initially, Jorah is actually spying on the Targaryens for Lord Varys in exchange for a pardon for his crimes. But after learning more about Daenerys, Jorah falls in love with her and decides to protect her and help her regain the Iron Throne. After she is widowed following Khal Drogo's death, he remains with her and becomes the first knight of her Queensguard. Eventually, Jorah's spying is exposed, and Daenerys banishes him from her service. He contracts greyscale, a fatal disease, while travelling with Tyrion Lannister. He eventually reunites with his queen, who orders him to cure himself of the greyscale. He journeys to the Citadel, where he meets Samwell Tarly, who served under his father Jeor as a brother of the Night's Watch. Samwell is able to cure Jorah, who returns to Daenerys's service and is part of the group who journey beyond the Wall to prove the existence of White Walkers. He dies defending Daenerys at Winterfell during the eventual victory over the Army of the Dead.

=== Viserys Targaryen ===
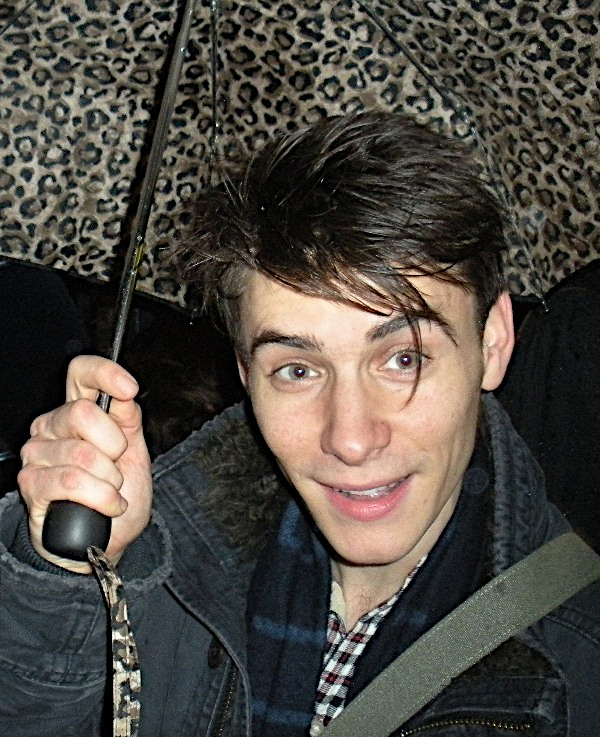
Harry Lloyd

Viserys Targaryen (portrayed by Harry Lloyd) is the exiled prince and heir of the Targaryen dynasty. Known as "the Beggar King" for his search for an army to recapture his throne. A narcissist, he is arrogant and self-centered, caring only about himself and looking down on others, especially his sister Daenerys. In exchange for an army to help regain the Iron Throne, Viserys marries off his sister to the powerful Dothraki warlord Khal Drogo and follows his horde's journey to the Dothraki capital to ensure Drogo will keep his end of the bargain. But as they travel, it becomes clear that Viserys lacks the leadership to reclaim the throne, and his arrogance and disrespect for the Dothraki win him no hearts.

Furthermore, Daenerys, whom he has always threatened throughout his life, starts to stand up to him. Realizing that Daenerys is loved by the Dothraki and that she and Drogo's unborn son are prophesied to unite the world, Viserys realizes that it is not he, but Daenerys, who will reclaim the Iron Throne. In a fit of drunken rage, he threatens Drogo to give him his army now, or he will kill his unborn son. Having had enough of his behavior, Drogo kills Viserys by giving him a "Golden Crown"; molten gold is poured over his head. Daenerys later names one of her dragons Viserion, as a tribute to Viserys.

=== Jon Snow ===
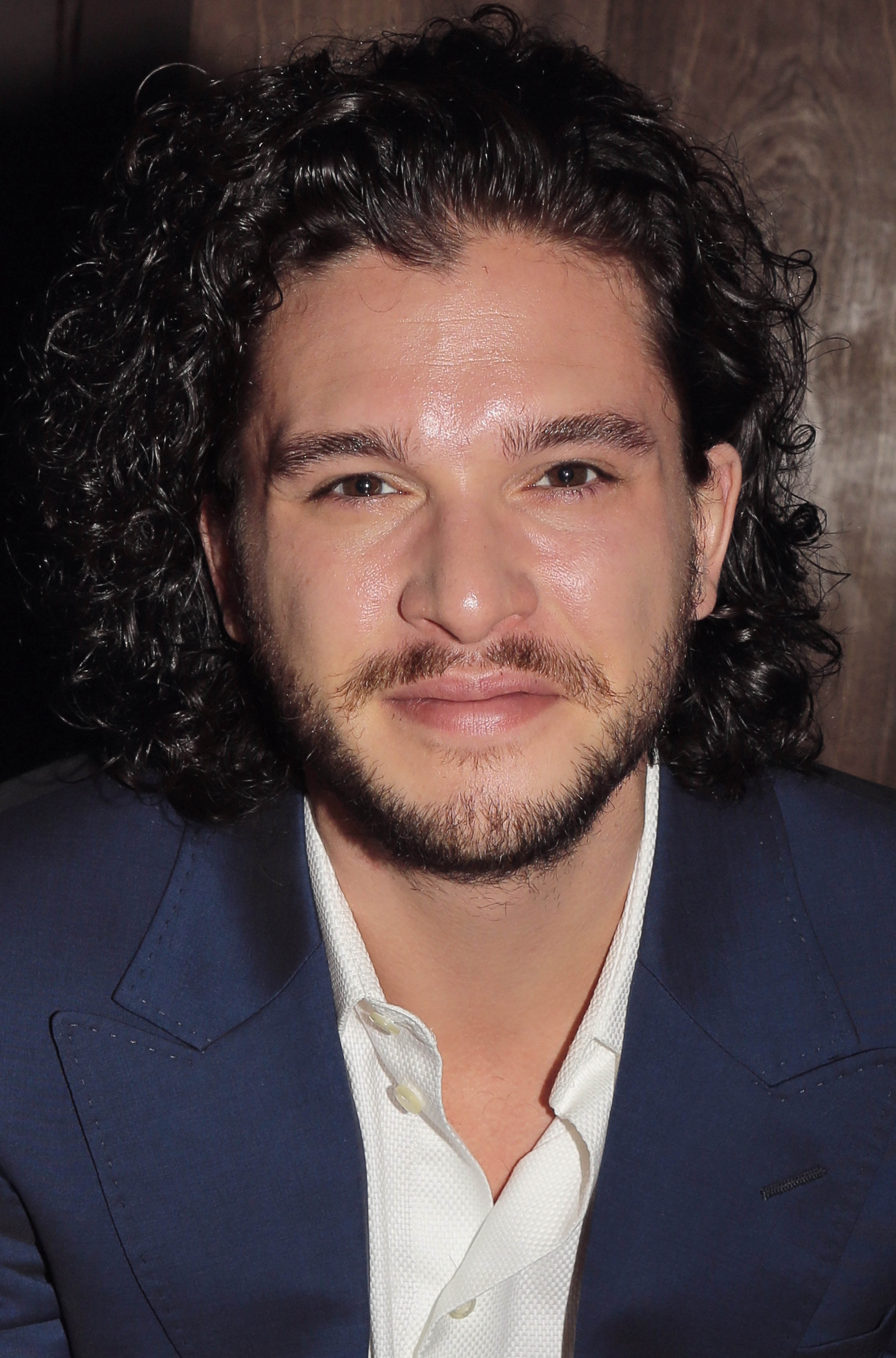
Kit Harington

Jon Snow (portrayed by Kit Harington) is the bastard son of Eddard Stark. Feeling isolated from his family due to his bastard status, he leaves their home of Winterfell to join the Night's Watch at Castle Black. Once there, he befriends Samwell Tarly and serves as steward to Lord Commander Jeor Mormont. During a ranging beyond the Wall, Jon is captured by wildlings and eventually joins their camp, falling in love with a wildling woman, Ygritte. After climbing back over the Wall with Ygritte, Jon flees to Castle Black. He leads the defence of the castle against a wildling attack (during which Ygritte is killed), hosts Stannis Baratheon and Lady Melisandre, and is elected as the new Lord Commander following his bravery in battle. He rescues a portion of wildlings from an attack by the White Walkers at the port of Hardhome. Upon his return to Castle Black, a group of Night's Watch brothers, angry with the new pact with the wildlings, mutiny and kill him. However, Jon is resurrected by Lady Melisandre, and he reunites with his sister Sansa. Jon is released from his Night's Watch vows, and the pair defeat House Bolton in battle, reclaiming Winterfell as their home.

The Northern lords name Jon King in the North. When the Dragon Queen Daenerys Targaryen arrives in Westeros, Jon convinces her to join the fight against the White Walkers and bends the knee to her. They travel beyond the Wall together to collect evidence of the White Walkers in a bid to convince Queen Cersei Lannister to join the defence. Daenerys' dragon Viserion is fatally injured during the mission, but the two fall in love. Jon is then revealed to be Aegon Targaryen, the legitimate son of Daenerys' brother Rhaegar and Ned Stark's sister Lyanna, making him the heir to the Iron Throne and Daenerys' nephew. Despite victory over the Army of the Dead, and despite Jon insisting he will not press his claim to the throne, the news weakens their relationship. Daenerys, having lost many close friends and two of her dragons during the war against the White Walkers, discovers that the population supports Jon's claim to the throne over hers. After she destroys King's Landing, which sees thousands of people die in the firestorms, Jon assassinates her and is exiled back to the Night's Watch as punishment.

=== Robb Stark ===
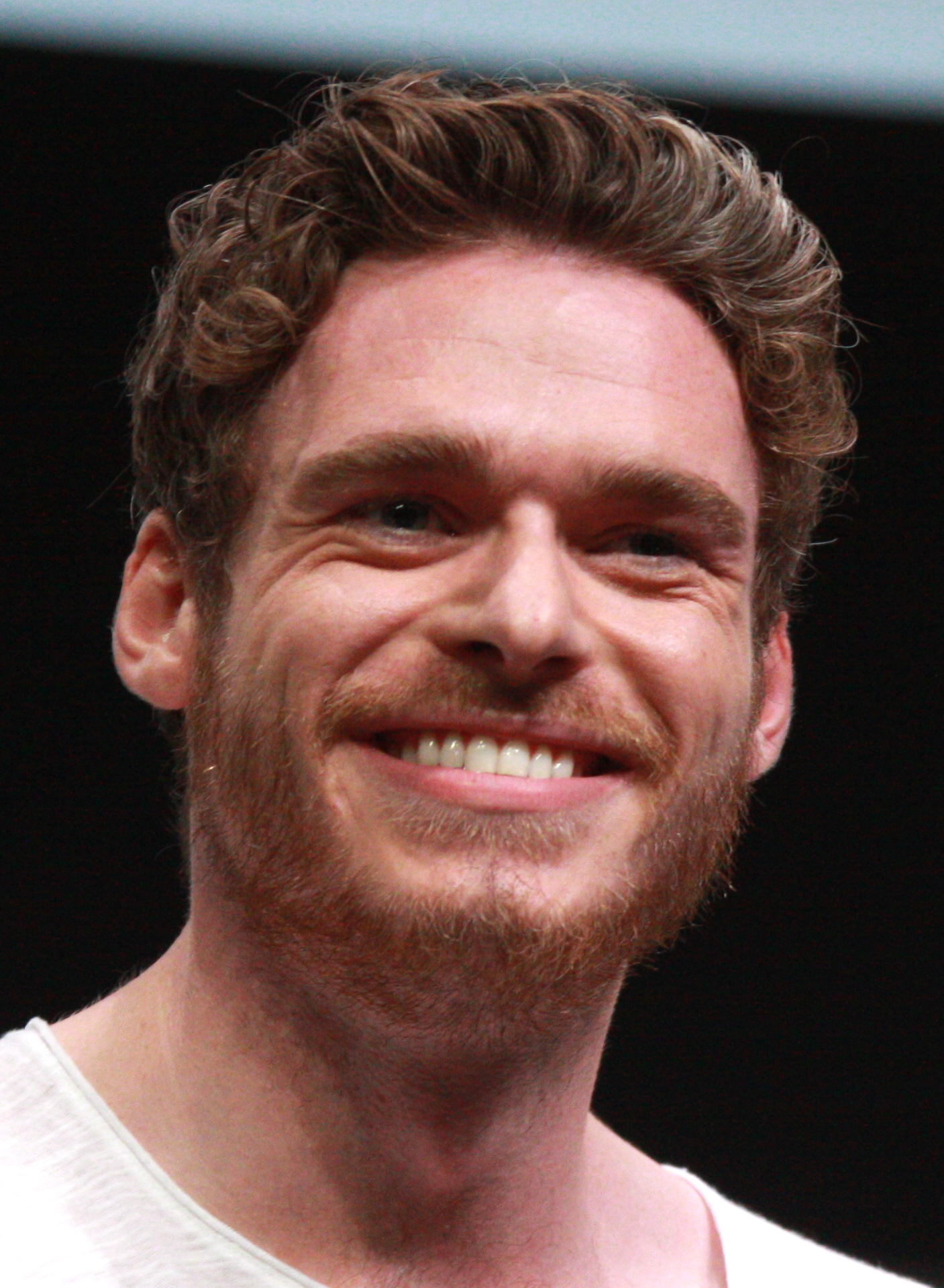
Richard Madden

Robb Stark (portrayed by Richard Madden) is the eldest son of Eddard and Catelyn Stark and the heir to Winterfell. His dire wolf is called Grey Wind. Robb becomes involved in the war against the Lannisters after his father, Ned Stark, is arrested for treason. Robb summons his bannermen for war against House Lannister and marches to the Riverlands. Eventually, crossing the Twins becomes strategically necessary. To win permission to cross, Robb agrees to marry a daughter of Walder Frey, Lord of the Twins. Robb leads the war effort against the Lannisters and successfully captures Jaime. After Ned is executed, the North and the Riverlands declare their independence from the Seven Kingdoms and proclaim Robb as their new King, "the King in the North". He wins a succession of battles in season 2, earning him the nickname the Young Wolf. However, he feels that he botched the political aspects of war. He sends Theon to the Iron Islands hoping that he can broker an alliance with Balon Greyjoy, Theon's father. In exchange for Greyjoy support, Robb, as King in the North, will recognize the Iron Islands' independence. He also sends his mother, Catelyn, to deal with Stannis Baratheon and Renly Baratheon, both of whom are fighting to be the rightful king.

Theon and Catelyn fail in their missions, and Balon launches an invasion of the North. Robb falls in love with Talisa Maegyr, a healer from Volantis, because of her kindness and spirit. Despite his mother's protest, Robb breaks his engagement with the Freys and marries Talisa in the 2nd-season finale. On news of his grandfather, Lord Hoster Tully's, death, Robb and his party travel north to Riverrun for the funeral, where the young king is reunited with his great-uncle, Ser Brynden "Blackfish" Tully, and his uncle, Edmure Tully, the new lord of Riverrun. While at Riverrun, Robb makes the decision to execute Lord Rickard Karstark for the murders of two teenage squires related to the Lannisters, a decision that loses the support of the Karstarks and leads Robb to make the ultimately fatal decision to ask the Freys for their alliance. He is killed in the Red Wedding Massacre, after witnessing the murder of his pregnant wife and their child. Lord Bolton personally executes Robb, stabbing him through the heart while taunting that "the Lannisters send their regards," in fact, a promise made to Jaime (who had no knowledge of Bolton's impending treason) when leaving for the Twins. His corpse is later decapitated, and Grey Wind's head is sewn on and paraded around as the Stark forces are slaughtered by the Boltons and Freys.

=== Sansa Stark ===
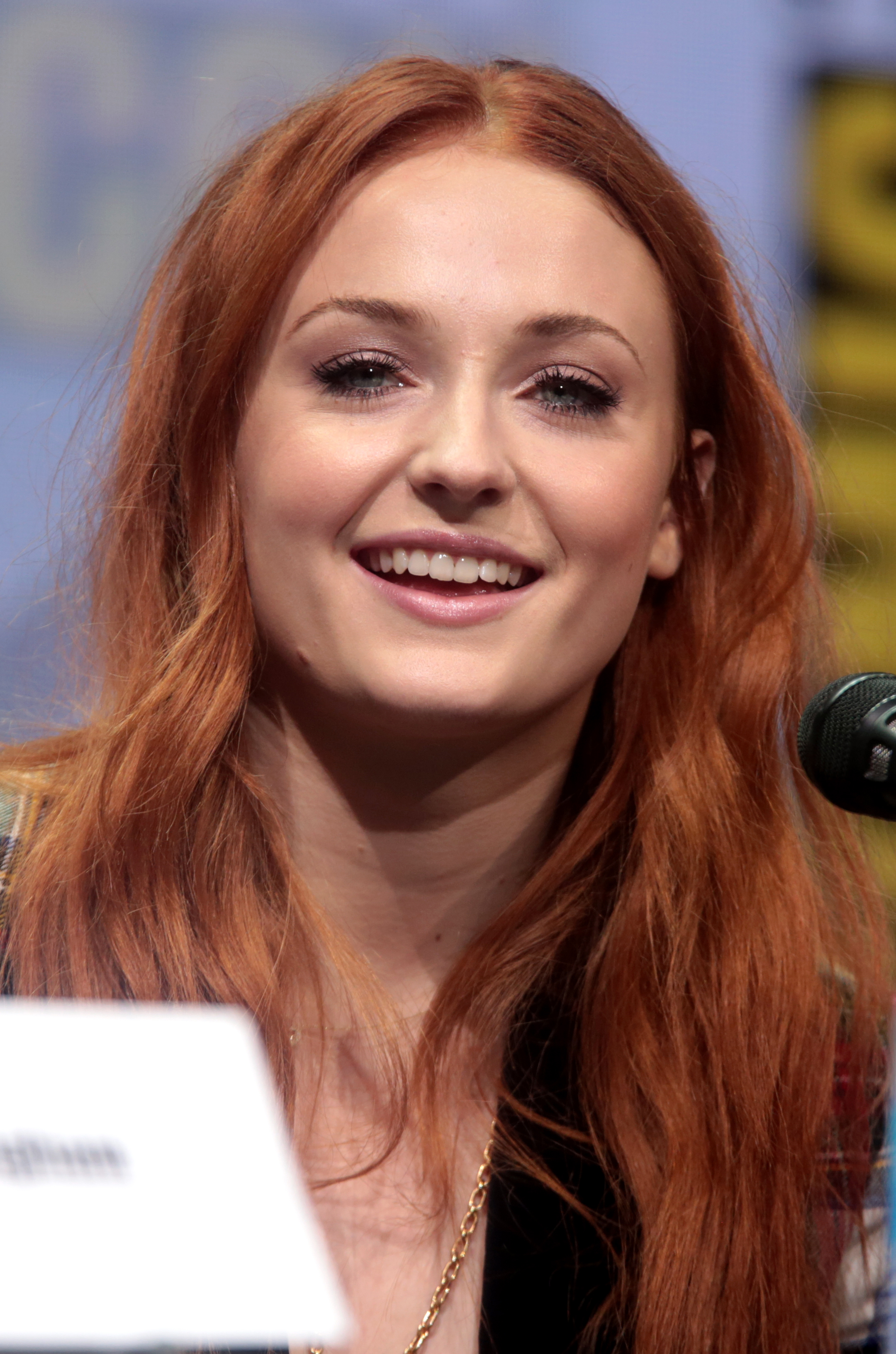
Sophie Turner

Sansa Stark (portrayed by Sophie Turner) is the first daughter and second child of Eddard and Catelyn Stark. Initially betrothed to King Joffrey, she is later released from her vow by Joffrey's betrothal to Margaery Tyrell. Then forced to marry Tyrion Lannister, but it was never consummated. When Joffrey is poisoned at his wedding to Margaery, Sansa is smuggled out of King's Landing by Littlefinger and taken first to the Eyrie and then to her home of Winterfell, now under the control of House Bolton. She is forced to marry the abusive and sadistic Ramsay Bolton, but later escapes with the help of Theon Greyjoy. She reunites with her brother Jon Snow at Castle Black and, with Littlefinger's army, helps him reclaim Winterfell. She rules the fortress while Jon leaves to fight for Daenerys Targaryen, which Littlefinger uses as an opportunity to drive her away from her siblings until Brandon Stark (now the Three-Eyed Raven) reveals his treacherous past. Sansa gives the order to have Littlefinger executed by Arya. Sansa survives the attack of the White Walkers and is eventually crowned as queen of an independent North.

=== Arya Stark ===
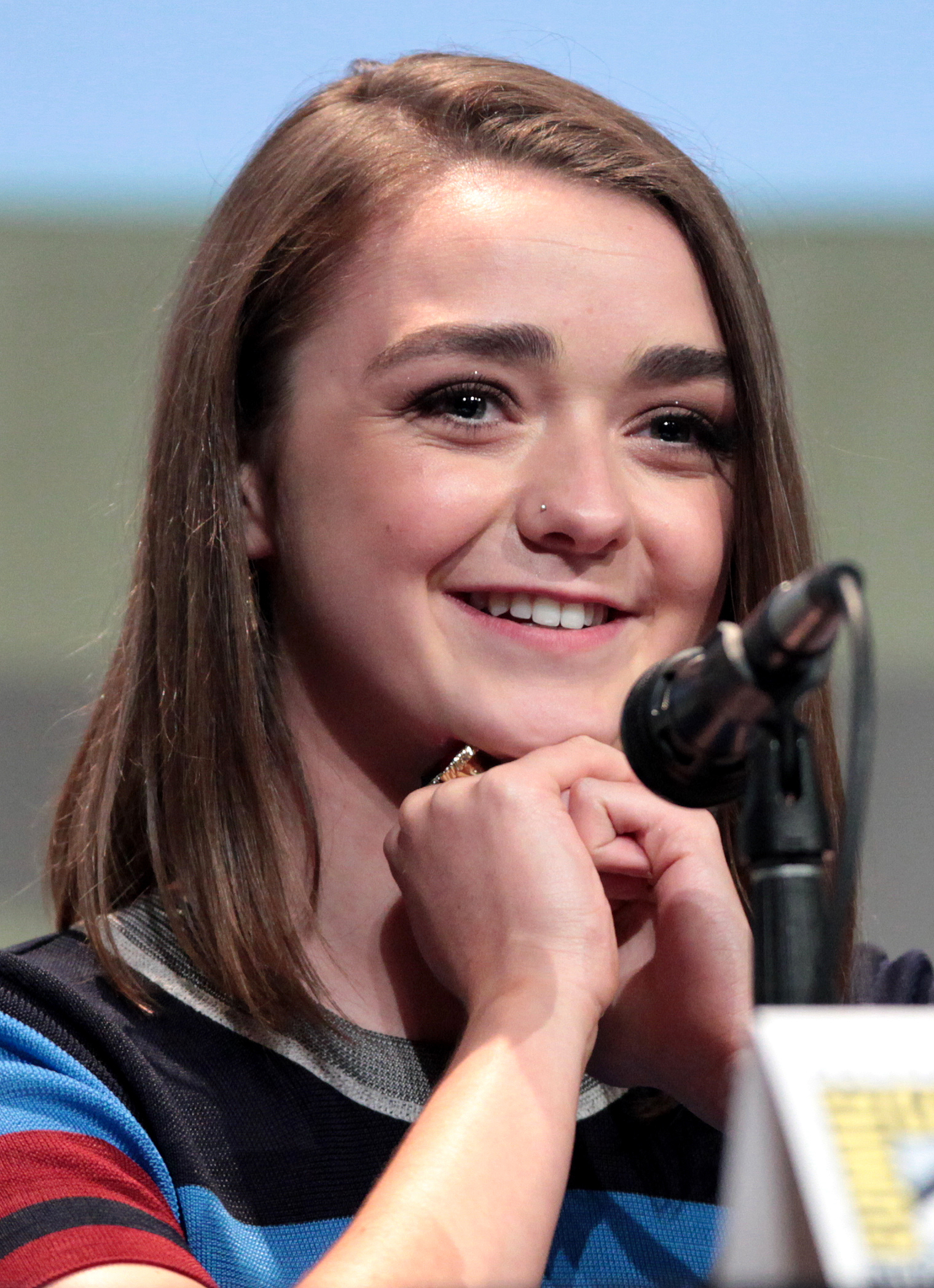
Maisie Williams

Arya Stark (portrayed by Maisie Williams) is the younger daughter of Lord Eddard and Catelyn Stark of Winterfell. A tomboy at heart, Arya is active and bright. She names her dire wolf Nymeria, after a legendary warrior queen. After travelling to King's Landing with her father Ned Stark, the new Hand of the King to Robert Baratheon, she is taught by Syrio Forel in the art of "water dancing", a form of sword fighting. When Ned is executed, she escapes the capital with Yoren and his Night's Watch recruits. On the road, she is captured by Lannister soldiers and, along with her friends Gendry and Hot Pie, imprisoned at Harrenhal, where she meets mysterious assassin Jaqen H'ghar and serves as Tywin Lannister's cupbearer. After escaping Harrenhal, the trio encounters the Brotherhood without Banners, a group of religious outlaws who protect the countryside. When the Brotherhood sells Gendry to Lady Melisandre, Arya escapes and is captured by Sandor Clegane, the Hound. She is taken to The Twins to be reunited with her mother Catelyn and brother Robb, but only arrives in time to see them massacred at the Red Wedding. After travelling northwards, Sandor is gravely wounded in a fight, and Arya leaves him for dead before sailing to Braavos. She trains with Jaqen H'ghar to become a Faceless Man but, after realising she cannot give up her identity, returns to Westeros and avenges the Red Wedding by slaughtering Walder Frey. She returns to Winterfell and eventually helps her sister Sansa and brother Brandon (now the Three-Eyed Raven) to uncover the meddling of Petyr Baelish, whom they execute on charges of murder and treason. Before the attack on Winterfell by White Walkers, she reunites with Gendry and Sandor (who survived his injuries). During the battle, she kills the Night King and saves Westeros from the Long Night. When Daenerys Targaryen plans to attack King's Landing, she travels south to get revenge on Cersei for her role in Ned's death. However, Arya is caught in the firestorms caused by Daenerys' dragon, Drogon, and is forced to flee the city instead. After Daenerys' assassination, Arya leaves Westeros for lands unknown.

=== Theon Greyjoy ===
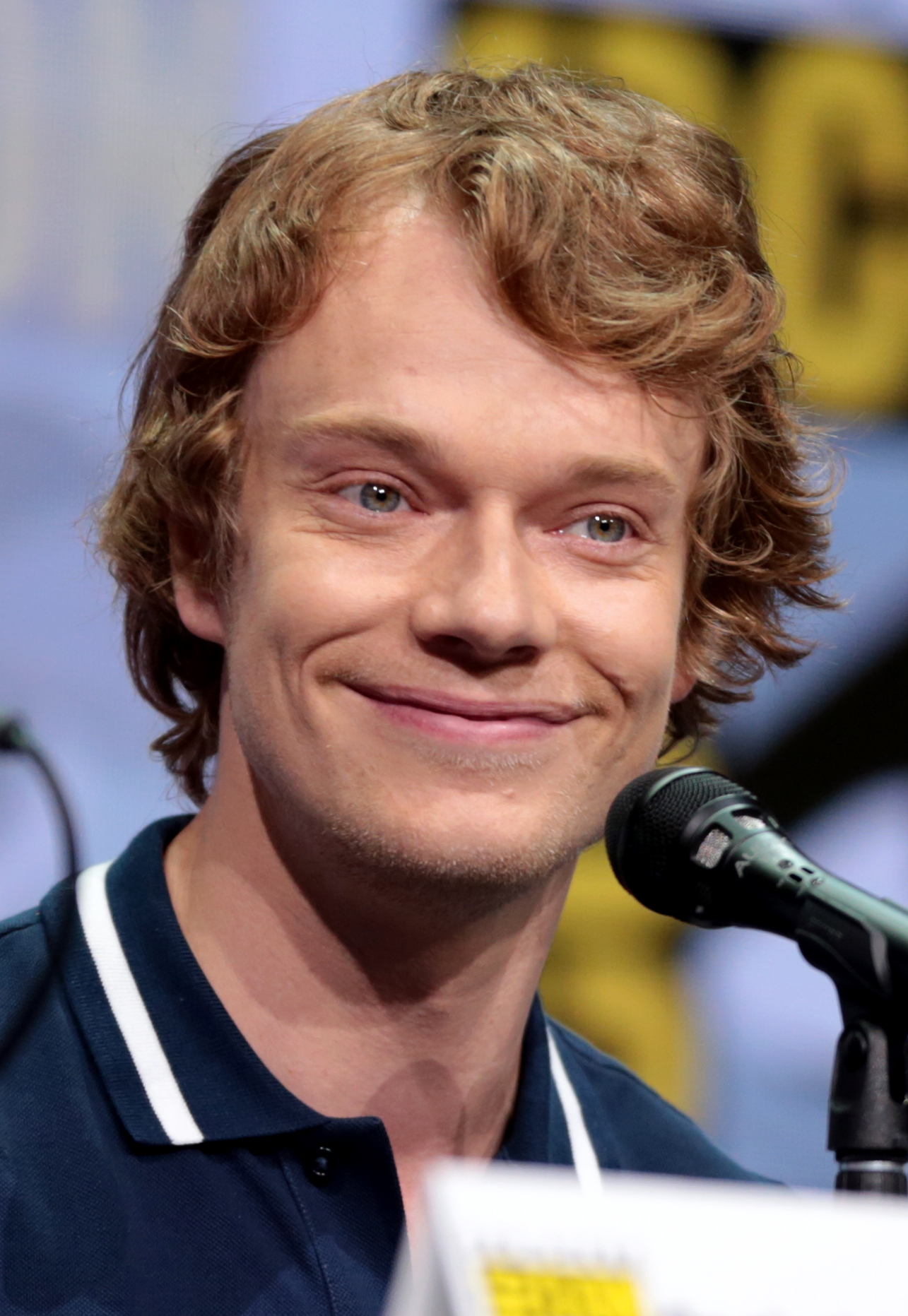
Alfie Allen

Theon Greyjoy (portrayed by Alfie Allen) is the youngest son of Lord Balon Greyjoy of the Iron Islands. He is the hostage and ward of Lord Eddard Stark, stemming from the failed Greyjoy Rebellion years earlier. Despite his position, he remains loyal to the Starks and is good friends with his sons Robb and Jon. After Ned's execution in King's Landing by the Lannisters, he joins Robb's Northern war effort as one of his advisers. He is ordered by Robb to return to the Iron Islands to convince his father Balon to ally with the Northern soldiers against the crown, but instead betrays Robb and decides to seize Winterfell for himself, taking the castle from Brandon Stark. While he rules Winterfell, he pretends to have burned Bran and Rickon Stark alive. When the Boltons capture Winterfell from the Ironborn soldiers, Theon is held as a prisoner by Ramsay Bolton. He is then mutilated and tortured beyond recognition, and eventually believes himself to be called "Reek". He becomes a servant at Winterfell and soon reunites with Sansa Stark, who has been forced into a marriage with Ramsay. When Stannis Baratheon attacks the castle, the pair escape their captor, and Theon returns home to the Iron Islands. He discovers that his father is dead and that his uncle, Euron, has seized the Salt Throne. Theon escapes with Yara and sails across the Narrow Sea to ally with Daenerys Targaryen. While on a mission to Dorne to gather soldiers for Daenerys' army, Theon and Yara are attacked by Euron at sea, with Theon jumping overboard and Yara being taken prisoner. Theon rescues Yara and sends her home to the Iron Islands, while he returns to Winterfell to face the Army of the Dead, reuniting with Sansa once more. He defends Brandon Stark against the oncoming undead forces, but is eventually killed by the Night King. His death is not in vain, however, as the Night King's forces are defeated.

=== Brandon "Bran" Stark ===
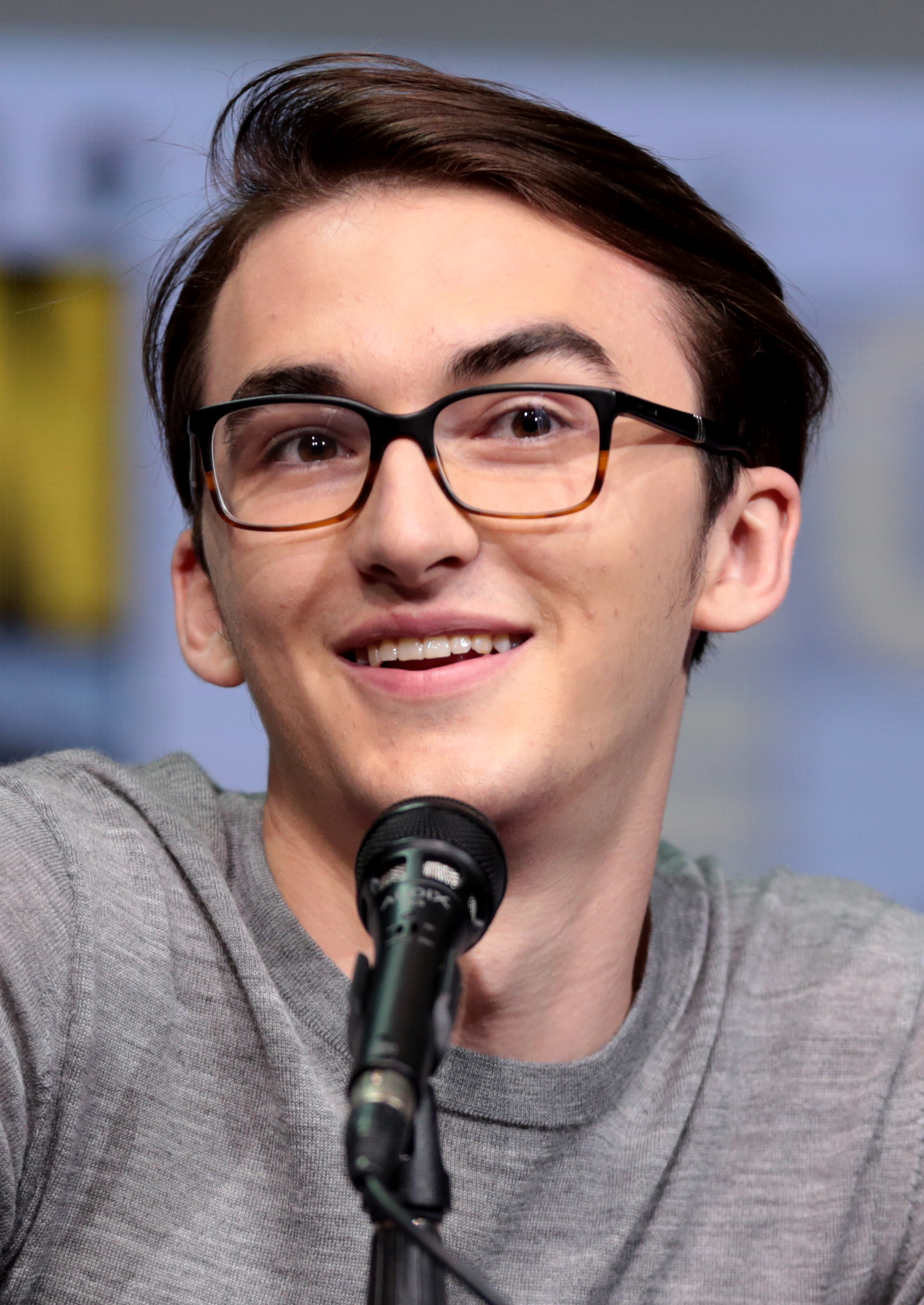
Isaac Hempstead Wright

Bran Stark (portrayed by Isaac Hempstead Wright) is the fourth child of Eddard and Catelyn Stark. He was named after his deceased uncle, Brandon. His dire wolf is called Summer. During King Robert's visit to Winterfell, he accidentally encounters Cersei and Jaime Lannister engaging in their incestuous affair, following which Bran is shoved from the window by Jaime, leaving him paralysed below the waist. When Robb marches south to avenge Eddard's death, Brandon rules Winterfell alongside Maester Luwin. When Theon Greyjoy's Ironborn soldiers seize Winterfell, they pretend to have burned Bran alive, when in reality Bran has escaped the castle to find a Three-Eyed Raven who appears in his dreams. He travels beyond the Wall to find the raven with his brother Rickon, servant Hodor, the wildling Osha, direwolves Summer and Shaggydog, and eventually Jojen and Meera Reed. Osha, Rickon, and Shaggydog leave for Last Hearth.

Once beyond the Wall, they are briefly captured by Night's Watch mutineers at Craster's Keep, but free themselves and eventually reach the cave of the Three-Eyed Raven. Jojen is killed by undead wights before they can reach safety. Once there, since Bran is both a Greenseer and a Warg, he undergoes training to become the next Three-Eyed Raven and experiences several visions of the future and past. When the Night King enters one of these visions and breaks the spell protecting the cave, Bran and Meera are forced to flee while Hodor, Summer, and the elder Three-Eyed Raven are all killed by the White Walkers and the undead. Now the Three-Eyed Raven, Bran experiences all of time at once, and begins to lose his sense of self. Upon returning to Winterfell from beyond the Wall, he bids a cold farewell to Meera, and his family no longer recognise him. It is revealed that the Night King intends to kill Bran in an attempt to wipe out the order of Three-Eyed Ravens and erase the world's memory. Bran is used as bait to lure the Night King to a place where he can be killed, which Bran's sister Arya Stark successfully manages. After Daenerys Targaryen destroys King's Landing with her dragon and kills Queen Cersei Lannister, Bran is selected to be the new ruler of Westeros.

=== Joffrey Baratheon ===
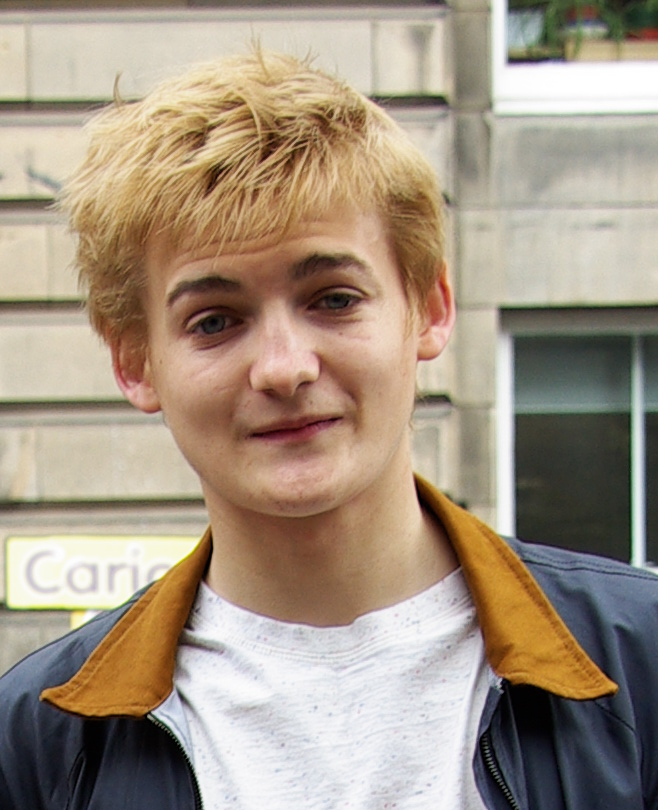
Jack Gleeson

Joffrey Baratheon (portrayed by Jack Gleeson) is the Crown Prince of the Seven Kingdoms. He is the eldest of Cersei Lannister's children and heir to the Iron Throne. Vicious and cruel, he has a short temper and believes he can do anything he wants. He is also a coward when confronted by those who are not afraid of him. Joffrey is unaware that King Robert is not his real father – who, in reality, is Jaime Lannister. After Robert's death, the Lannisters crown Joffrey as the new king against his father's will, and Joffrey becomes a cruel ruler and a puppet king used by his mother. After being initially betrothed to Sansa Stark, the arrival of the Tyrells in King's Landing results in Joffrey casting Sansa aside for Margaery Tyrell. During their wedding day, however, Joffrey is assassinated in front of a large crowd by poison.

=== Sandor Clegane ===
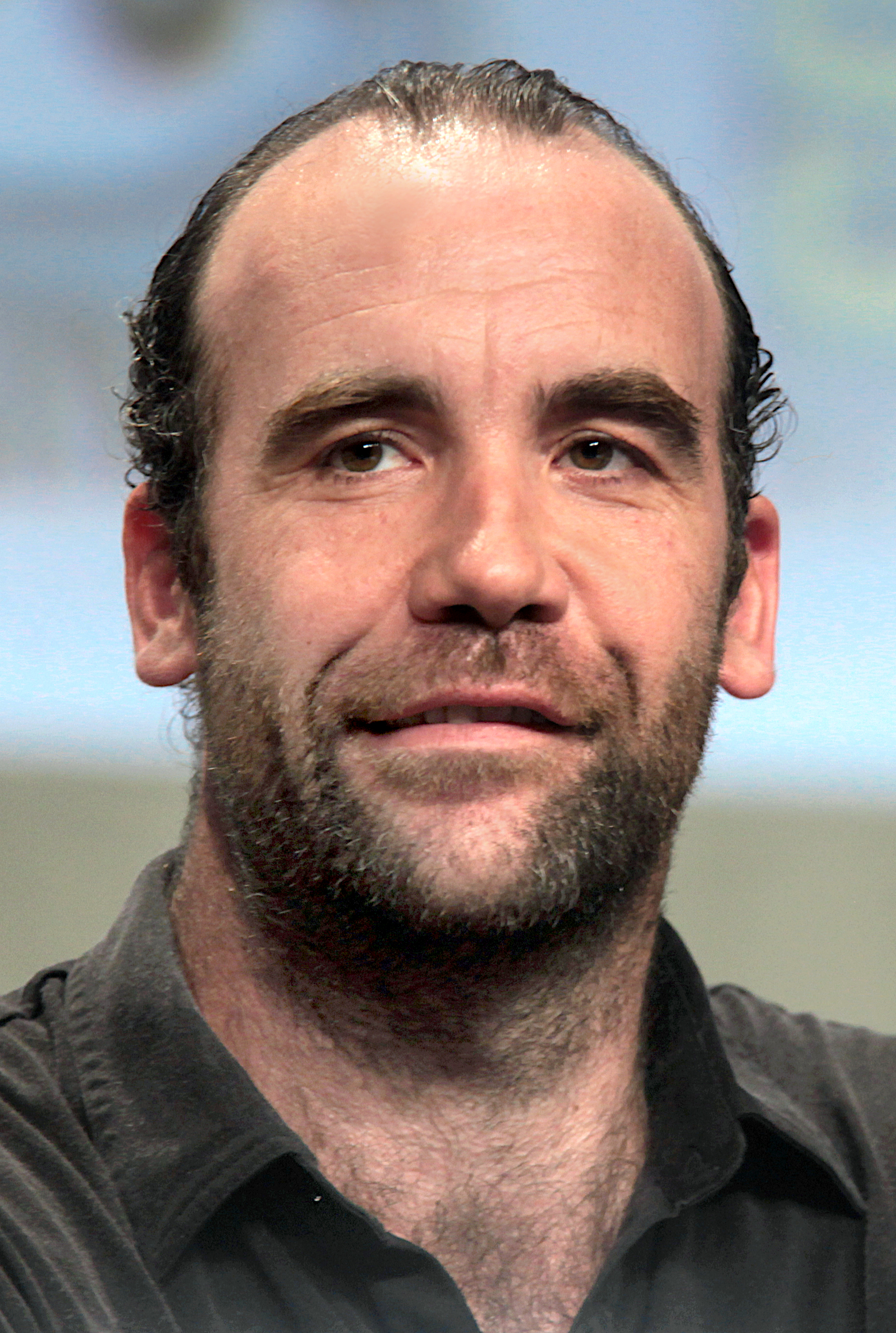
Rory McCann

Sandor Clegane (portrayed by Rory McCann) is the younger brother of Ser Gregor Clegane. He is also Joffrey Baratheon's personal bodyguard. The right side of his face was grievously burned when he was only a boy after his brother pushed his face into a brazier, leaving him with a fear of fire. He is taciturn and brutal, but not without compassion. He is protective towards Sansa after she is captured by the Lannisters. After Joffrey becomes King, Sandor is made a member of the Kingsguard. Although he is faithful to Joffrey, he frequently defends Sansa from Joffrey's attempts to physically abuse her. During the Battle of Blackwater, Sandor's fear of fire overwhelms him. He resigns from the Kingsguard and leaves King's Landing. While on the road, he is captured by Beric Dondarrion and Thoros of Myr, leaders of the Brotherhood without Banners. He is released after winning a trial-by-combat.

He kidnaps Arya Stark with the intention of selling her to her mother and brother, Catelyn and Robb Stark, only to see them slaughtered at the Red Wedding. He then plans to take Arya to her aunt, Lysa, in the Vale, only to find out that she too has recently died. The pair encounter Brienne and Podrick on the road, with Sandor losing a fight to Brienne. Arya leaves him for dead. Roughly a year later, it is revealed that Sandor survived his injuries and has been living a peaceful life, building a small sept in the Riverlands. When the villagers he works with are massacred, he reunites with Beric and Thoros on their mission beyond the Wall to gather evidence of the White Walkers, along with Jon Snow, Ser Jorah Mormont, Tormund Giantsbane, and Gendry Baratheon. Thoros dies on the mission. During a parley with Queen Cersei Lannister, Sandor encounters his brother and promises revenge. He reunites with Arya Stark, survives the attack on Winterfell from the Night King, and journeys south with her as his companion. Once in the capital, he finds his brother and fights with him to the death as the pair perish in the firestorms caused by Daenerys Targaryen.

=== Tyrion Lannister ===
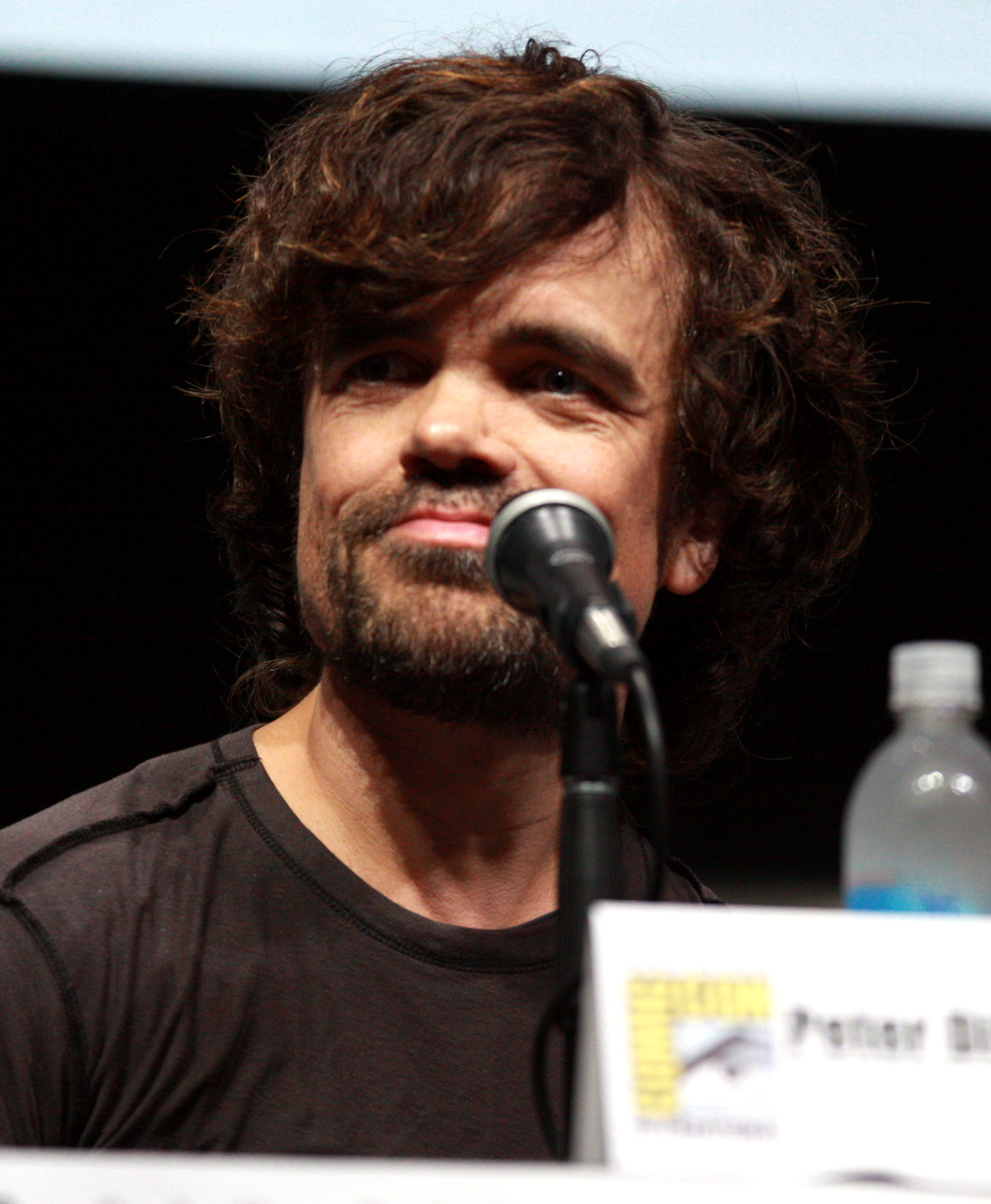
Peter Dinklage

Tyrion Lannister (portrayed by Peter Dinklage) is the younger brother of Cersei and Jaime Lannister. He is a dwarf, and his mother died during his birth, for which his father, Tywin Lannister, blames him. While not physically powerful, Tyrion has a cunning mind. After being falsely accused of the attempted murder of Brandon Stark, he survives a battle with Robb Stark's forces and returns to King's Landing, where he takes the position as King Joffrey's Hand of the King. After Tywin wins the Battle of Blackwater for the Lannisters, Tyrion is demoted from his position and renamed Master of Coin. He engages in a secret love affair with the prostitute Shae until he is forcibly married to Sansa Stark (something Shae resents him for), and Cersei learns of Shae's relationship to Tyrion. After King Joffrey is poisoned at his wedding to Margaery Tyrell, Tyrion is framed for the crime. Shae testifies against Tyrion, and Tywin sentences him to death.

Tyrion escapes the capital with the help of his brother Jaime and Lord Varys, but not before taking revenge on Shae and Tywin by killing them both. He travels across the Narrow Sea and soon reaches Meereen, where he joins the advisory team of Daenerys Targaryen. He rules the city during her absence after an attack by the Sons of the Harpy and is named Hand of the Queen upon her return. Tyrion accompanies Daenerys back across the Narrow Sea, supporting her claim against his sister Cersei. His plans to ensure the invasion is bloodless, however, see Daenerys lose valuable allies, and she begins to doubt his ability as a strategist. After the White Walkers are defeated at Winterfell, Tyrion accompanies Daenerys during her mission to finally conquer King's Landing. Not wanting his family to die in battle, however, he secretly arranges for Jaime and Cersei to escape the city. After Daenerys destroys the city and massacres the city's population, including Cersei and Jaime, Tyrion resigns as Hand of the Queen and is imprisoned. When Daenerys is assassinated by Jon Snow, Tyrion is freed and named as Bran the Broken's Hand of the King.

=== Petyr "Littlefinger" Baelish ===
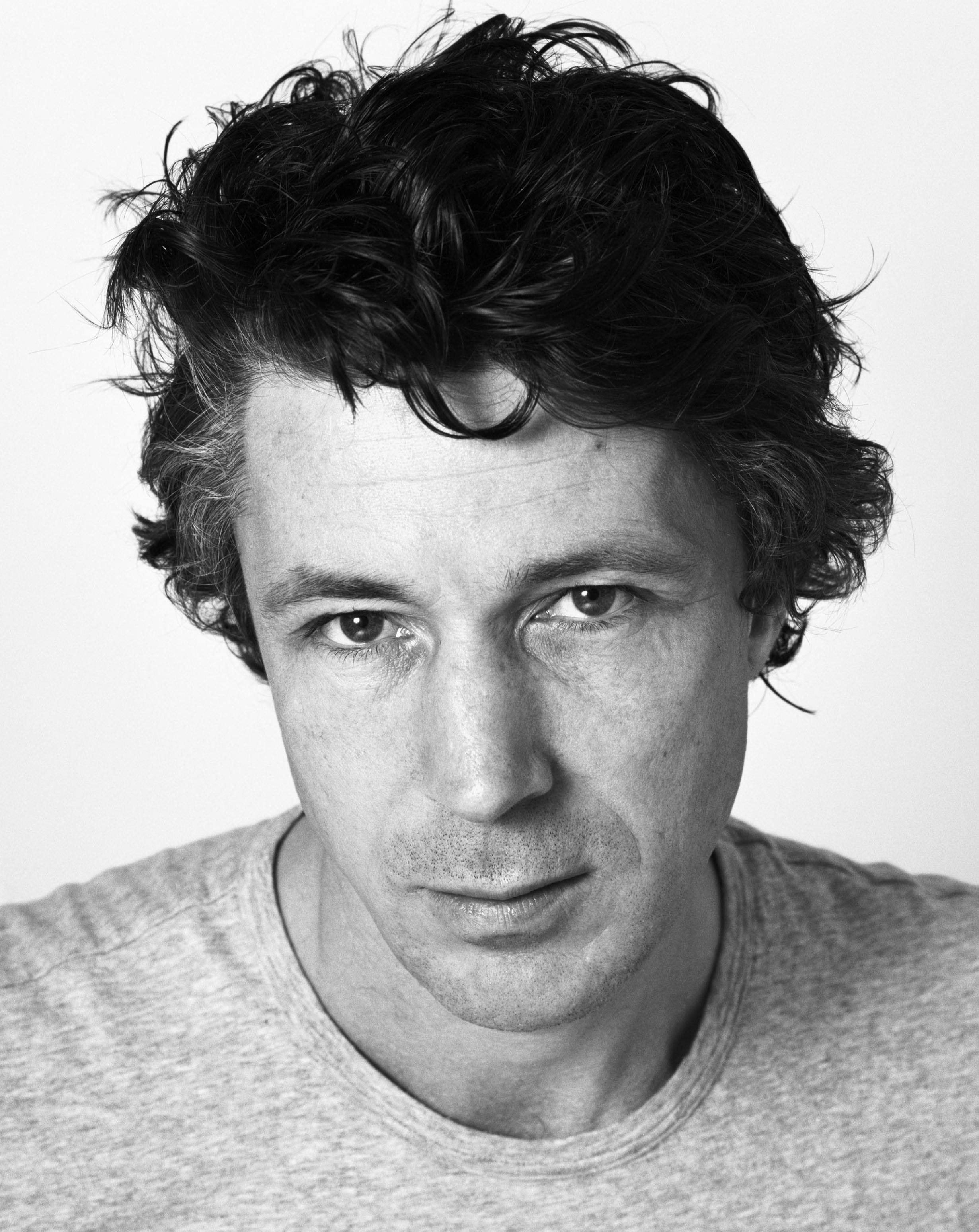
Aidan Gillen

Petyr Baelish (portrayed by Aidan Gillen) is the Master of Coin in King Robert Baratheon's Small Council. Petyr is a master manipulator who knows the ongoing affairs within the Seven Kingdoms, thanks to his spies. While Petyr is at first assumed to be an ally of Ned Stark, he secretly resents him for marrying Catelyn Tully and betrays him, leading to Ned's execution. Petyr owns a King's Landing brothel, where he employs (and mistreats) several workers. He also has an ongoing feud with Lord Varys, another of Westeros' spymasters. After the Battle of Blackwater, Sansa Stark (Catelyn's daughter) is cast aside by King Joffrey for Margaery Tyrell. Petyr attempts to persuade Sansa to leave the capital with him, but she refuses. When Joffrey is poisoned at his own wedding, Sansa is secretly smuggled out of the capital by Petyr, who planned Joffrey's assassination with Lady Olenna Tyrell. He then takes her to the Eyrie, where he is to marry her aunt and Catelyn's sister, Lysa Arryn.

While at the Eyrie, it is revealed that Petyr has fallen in love with Sansa due to her resemblance to her mother. Lysa discovers this information and tries to have Sansa killed, only for Petyr to push her through the castle's moon door to her death instead. Sansa lies for Petyr and says Lysa jumped to her death of her own accord. Petyr and Sansa then journey to Winterfell, where Petyr arranges for Sansa to marry Ramsay Bolton. Petyr then travels to King's Landing and reveals to Cersei that Sansa, a suspect in Joffrey's murder, has resurfaced in the North. Petyr returns to the Vale and commands the Knights of the Vale to join his cause to reclaim Winterfell from the Boltons. The Knights of the Vale then assist Jon Snow's wildling army against the Boltons, and Winterfell is returned to Stark hands. With Jon Snow, new King in the North, in the south with Daenerys Targaryen, Petyr attempts to divide Sansa, Arya, and Bran, the recently reunited Stark siblings. Bran (now the Three-Eyed Raven), however, uncovers his treachery, reveals the litany of crimes he committed against the Starks, and Sansa then sentences Petyr to death.

=== Davos Seaworth ===
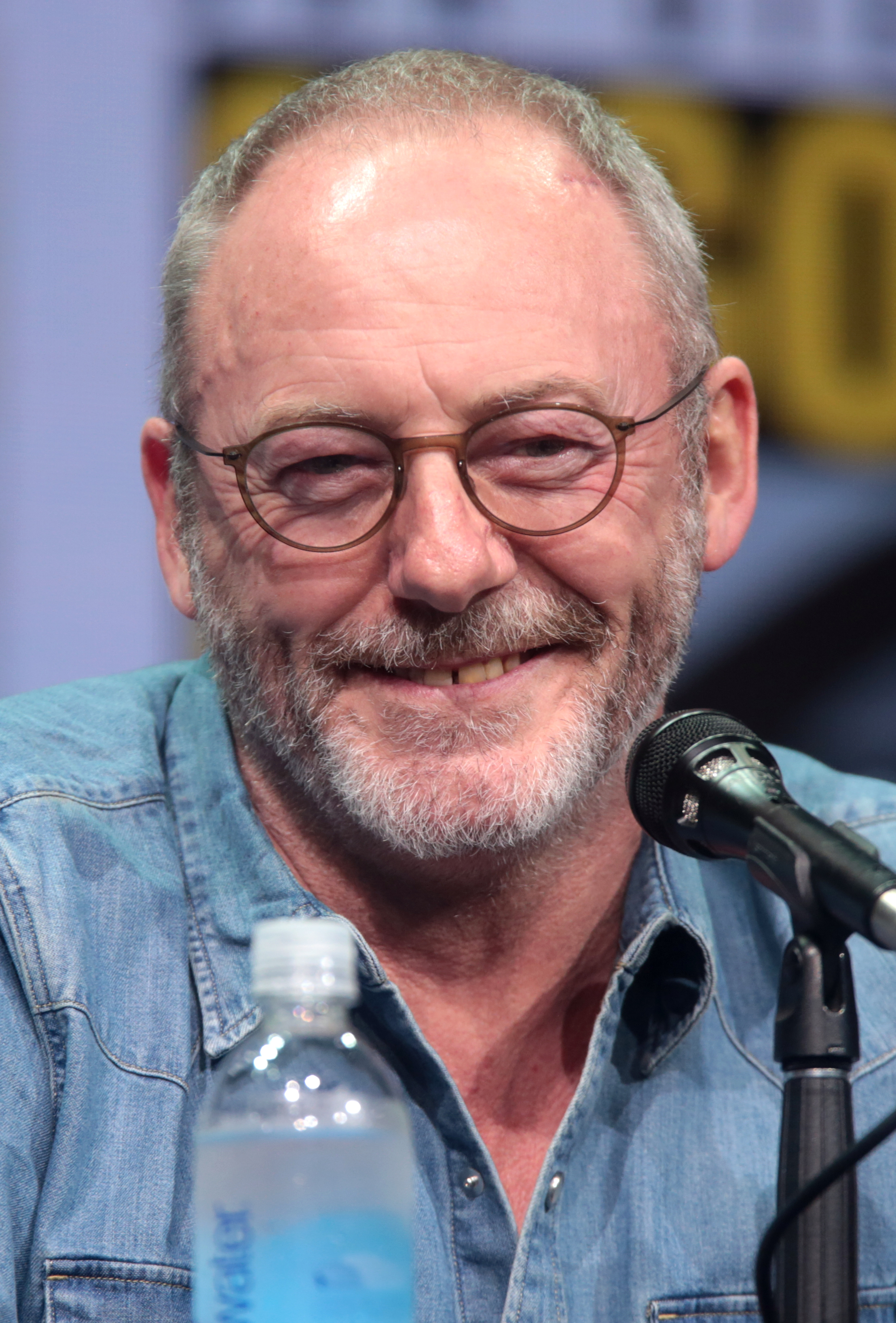
Liam Cunningham

Davos Seaworth (portrayed by Liam Cunningham) is a former smuggler and knight in the service of Stannis Baratheon. A natural sceptic of religion and magic, he distrusts another of Stannis' advisers, the Lady Melisandre, and her belief in the Lord of Light. Before the events of the series, he earned his knighthood by smuggling food to the besieged Stannis Baratheon and his army. Before knighting him, however, Stannis removed the last joints from four fingers on his right hand as punishment for his years of smuggling. Davos leads Stannis' fleet into King's Landing during a siege on the capital but is shipwrecked during Tyrion Lannister's defence of the city. He awakens on an island and returns to Dragonstone, Stannis' headquarters, where he is imprisoned for attempting to murder Lady Melisandre. In the cells, he befriends Shireen, Stannis' daughter, who visits him and teaches him how to read. He also forms a bond with Gendry, Stannis' illegitimate nephew, whom he frees from the dungeons and returns to King's Landing. Davos is welcomed back into Stannis' service despite setting Gendry free, and is present when Stannis travels first to Braavos and then to Castle Black. When Stannis marches south from Castle Black with Melisandre to claim Winterfell, Davos is told to return to the Wall and befriends Jon Snow.

Davos soon learns that Stannis, his family, and his entire army were killed during the attempt to take Winterfell, but he is unaware that Shireen was burned alive as a sacrifice by Melisandre, who returns to the Wall in disgrace, her king having been defeated. When Jon Snow is assassinated in a mutiny for making a pact with the wildlings, Davos is the first person to find his body. He convinces Melisandre to resurrect Jon, using her religious magic, and finds Jon alive the next morning. He joins Jon's wildling army in the Battle of the Bastards, helping to reclaim the castle for the Starks. Before the battle, he discovers that Shireen was burned alive, and after the battle he confronts Melisandre, leading to her banishment from the North. Davos then becomes a loyal member of Jon's council. He accompanies Jon to Dragonstone to meet with Daenerys Targaryen, then to Eastwatch on the mission to gather evidence of White Walkers, and then to King's Landing to display the evidence to Queen Cersei Lannister. He also reunites with Gendry. When the Night King breaks through the Wall and attacks Winterfell, Davos, along with the returning Melisandre, forms part of the army that defeats him. Davos is present when Daenerys destroys King's Landing with her last remaining dragon, Drogon, and eventually becomes a member of Bran the Broken's small council.

=== Samwell Tarly ===
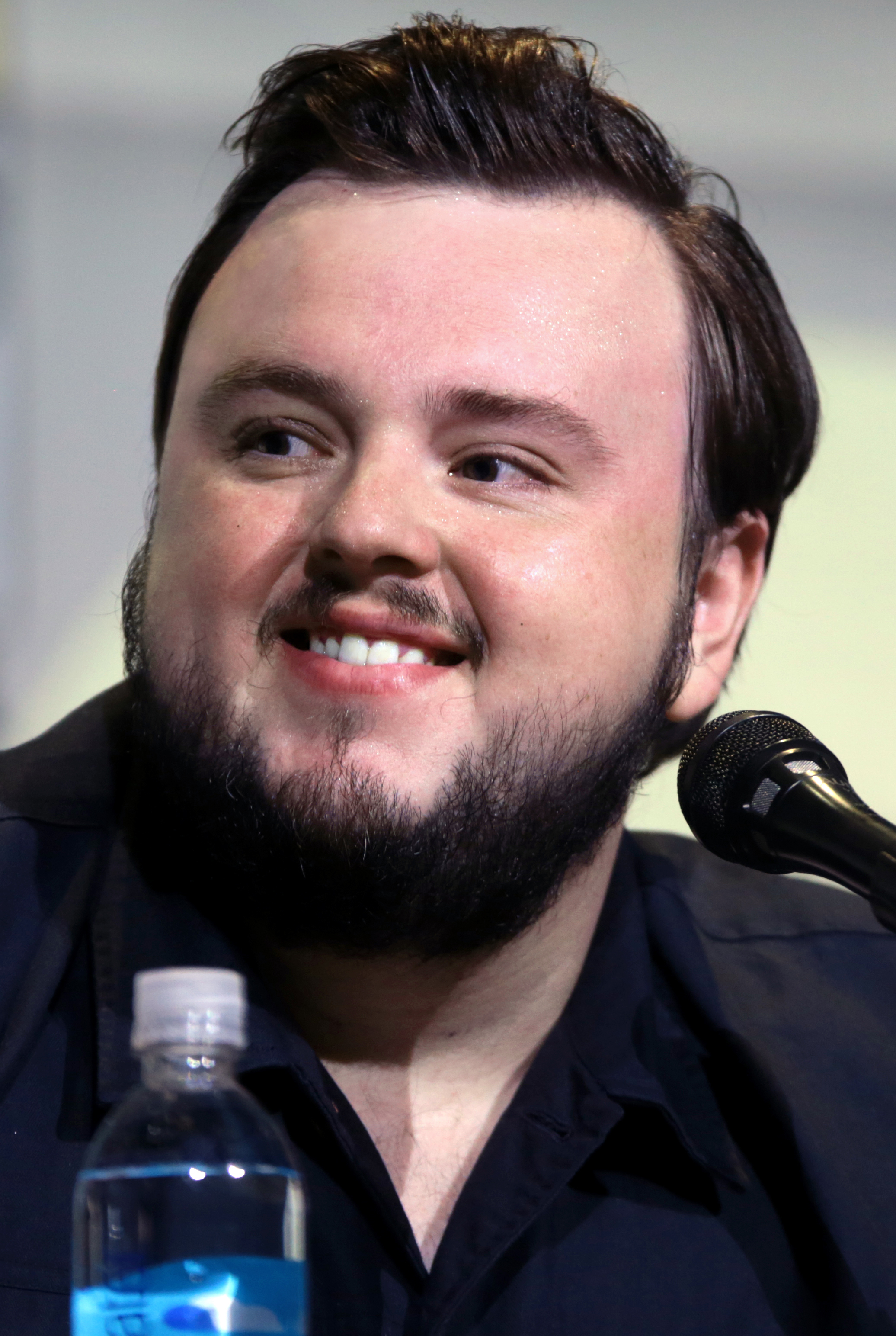
John Bradley

Samwell Tarly (portrayed by John Bradley) is the eldest son and former heir of Lord Randyll Tarly, and a new recruit to the Night's Watch. He was sent to the Wall by his father, who disowned him for his cowardice. He becomes Jon Snow's best friend. While not a warrior, he is very smart and insightful. He is inducted into the stewards and assigned to Maester Aemon. He joins the Night's Watch's Great Ranging beyond the Wall and survives that battle with White Walkers at the Fist of the First Men. Travelling back to Castle Black via Craster's Keep, Sam escapes the mutiny with Gilly and her newborn son, whom she eventually names Sam. When the trio is attacked by a White Walker while trekking through the wilderness, Sam uses dragonglass daggers (found at the Fist) to kill it. They return to Castle Black, reuniting with Jon Snow, and survive the attack by Mance Rayder's wildling army. Fearing for Gilly's safety at Castle Black due to her wildling status, Sam temporarily leaves the Night's Watch with Jon's permission to become a maester of the Citadel. Initially planning to leave Gilly and little Sam at Horn Hill, his family home, he instead decides to bring them to the Citadel.

After curing Jorah Mormont of greyscale, they discover that a cave of dragonglass sits under Dragonstone, and Sam alerts Jon to this, eventually leading to Jon and Daenerys' meeting and union. Later, they uncover the truth that Rhaegar Targaryen and Lyanna Stark were wed before Robert's Rebellion and the birth of their son, Jon Snow. When the order of maesters turn out to be disbelieving of the White Walker threat, he abandons his lessons and returns to the North to face the Army of the Dead. He meets Brandon Stark, now the Three-Eyed Raven, and by corroborating their stories, they find out the truth that Jon is actually Aegon Targaryen, legitimate heir to the Iron Throne. Sam tells Jon of this truth when the latter returns to Winterfell, having left the Night's Watch after his assassination and resurrection, and after allying with Daenerys. Sam survives the attack by White Walkers on Winterfell, and stays at the castle with a newly pregnant Gilly. After Daenerys Targaryen destroys King's Landing, forcing Jon to assassinate her, Sam travels to the capital (presumably with Gilly and little Sam) and is present when Bran (dubbed Bran the Broken) is selected as Westeros' new ruler. He becomes a grandmaester in Bran's small council.

=== Stannis Baratheon ===
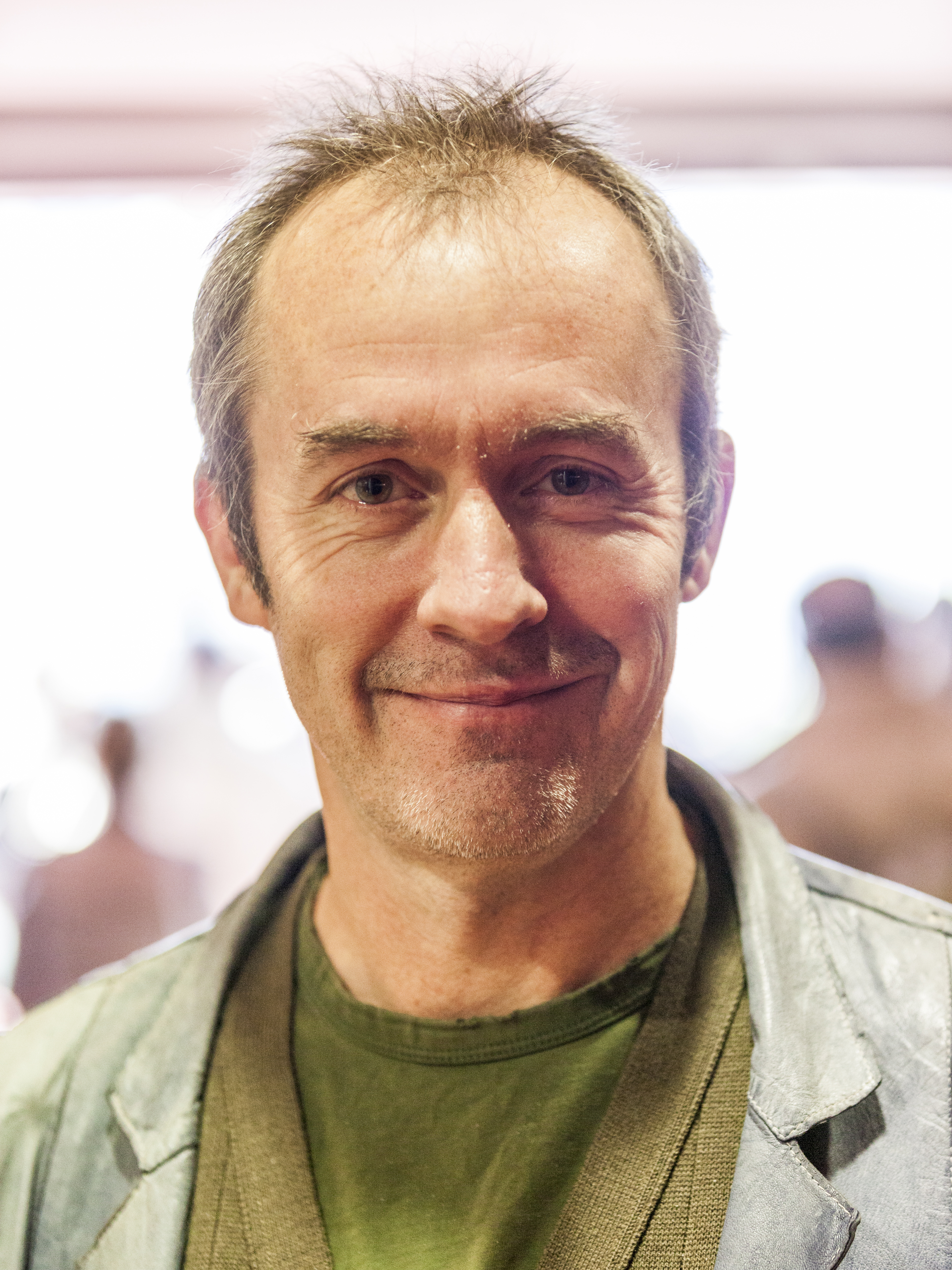
Stephen Dillane

Stannis Baratheon (portrayed by Stephen Dillane) is the elder of Robert Baratheon's younger brothers. He is a brooding, humorless man known for his hard sense of justice. When Robert dies, Ned Stark sends Stannis a letter appointing him as the legitimate heir. Stannis becomes a challenger for the Iron Throne after his nephew Joffrey Baratheon becomes king, becoming one of five in the War of Five Kings. Advised by the Red Priestess Lady Melisandre (follower of the Lord of Light) and Davos Seaworth, Stannis is based at Dragonstone, an offshore island in the Narrow Sea, where he lives with his daughter Shireen and wife Selyse. Melisandre convinces Stannis to kill his brother Renly Baratheon with a shadow demon and claim half of Renly's army for his own. After Renly is killed by a demon bearing Stannis' face, Lady Brienne, head of Renly's Kingsguard, promises to one day take revenge on Stannis. Stannis' army attacks King's Landing in an attempt to seize the throne but is repelled at the city's walls after a long battle. After his defeat, Stannis stays at Dragonstone while Melisandre heads to the Westeros mainland in search of Gendry Baratheon, Robert's illegitimate son. Melisandre returns to Dragonstone with Gendry and uses blood magic to cast a fatal curse over King Joffrey, King in the North Robb Stark, and Lord of the Iron Islands Balon Greyjoy.

Robb Stark is slaughtered at the Red Wedding soon after, while Joffrey is poisoned at his own wedding to Margaery Tyrell. With the War of Five Kings effectively concluded by their deaths, Stannis sails to Braavos in an attempt to secure funding from the Iron Bank. He then travels further north to Castle Black, and inadvertently ends the conflict between Mance Rayder's wildling army and the Night's Watch. He takes up residence at the fortress and tutors the young Lord Commander Jon Snow, in whom Melisandre takes a keen interest. With winter approaching, Stannis hurriedly marches south in an attempt to take Winterfell from the Boltons. With the weather closing in around them, and with his supplies dwindling, Melisandre suggests to Stannis that his daughter Shireen be sacrificed, in the hopes that her own king's blood will please the Lord of Light. Shireen is burned alive, causing half of Stannis' army to abandon his cause. Stannis attempts to take Winterfell regardless but is quickly defeated in the field. After the battle, he is discovered in a nearby forest by Lady Brienne, who avenges her long-deceased king by executing Stannis. Stannis does not live long enough to hear of Balon Greyjoy's death at the hands of his younger brother Euron, completing the list of those Melisandre cursed with blood magic.

=== Melisandre ===
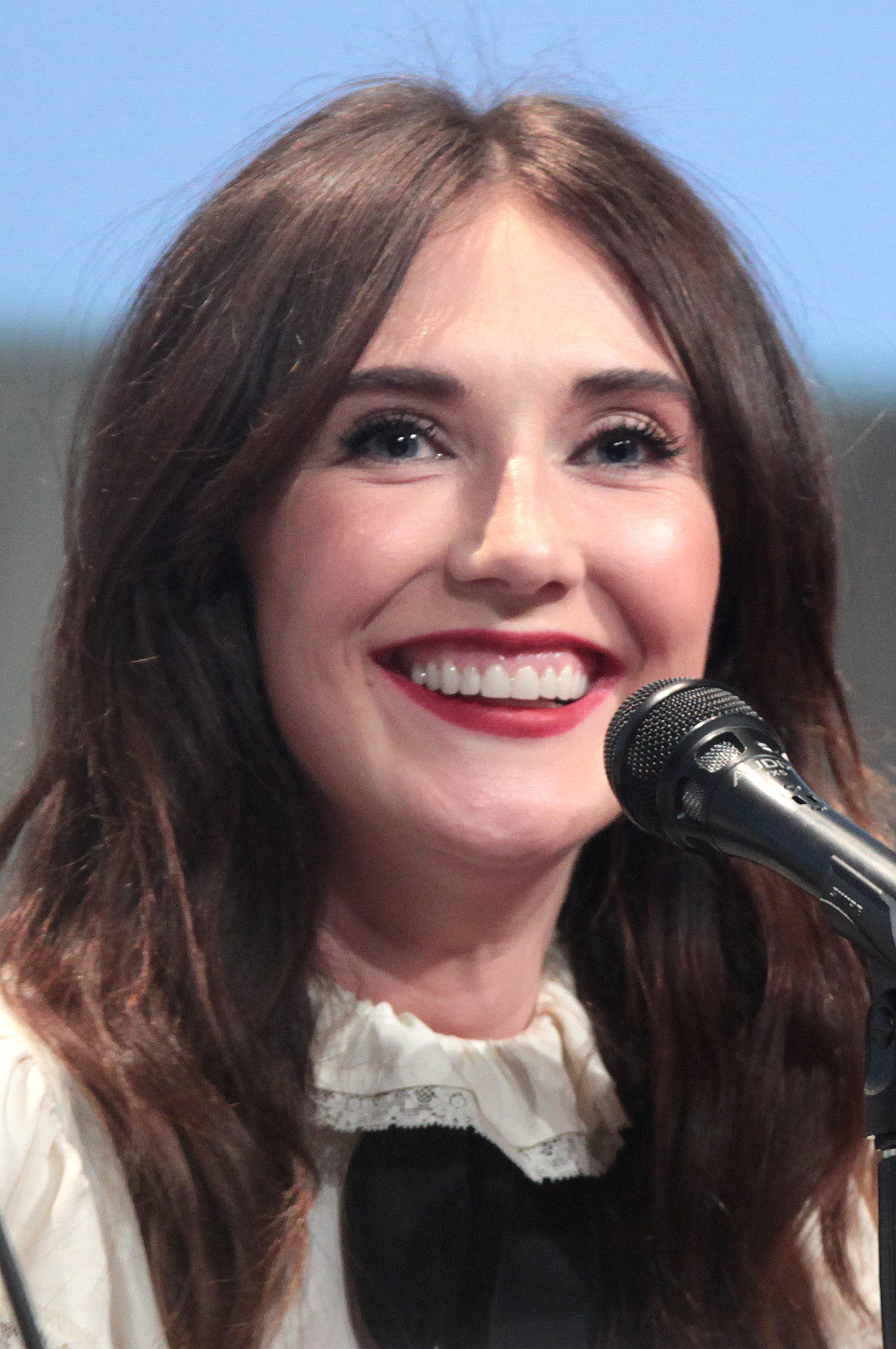
Carice van Houten

Melisandre (portrayed by Carice van Houten) is a priestess of the Lord of Light in service to Stannis Baratheon. Melisandre has prophetic powers that give her partial knowledge of future events. Unlike many other people in Westeros with access to prophecy, Melisandre has absolute faith in her own interpretation, even though she is sometimes wrong. Melisandre believes Stannis is the chosen one who will convert the people of Westeros into followers of the Lord of Light. Melisandre convinces Stannis to conceive a shadow demon with her, which she will use to murder Renly Baratheon, Stannis' brother and challenger to the throne. The shadow demon, bearing Stannis Baratheon's face, kills Renly. Melisandre is left behind at Dragonstone when Stannis is defeated in his attempts to seize King's Landing. After Stannis' return, Melisandre heads to the mainland in Westeros and meets with the Brotherhood without Banners and fellow Red Priest, Thoros of Myr. Gendry Baratheon, King Robert's bastard son, is sold to her, and she brings him back to Dragonstone. She uses his king's blood to curse Stannis' challengers to the Iron Throne. When Stannis sails to the Wall and resides at Castle Black, Melisandre accompanies him but takes a keen interest in the young Lord Commander, Jon Snow. She wears light clothing even in freezing temperatures, claiming that the Lord of Light's fire lives within her.

She then travels southward with Stannis when he tries to seize Winterfell from the Boltons. With winter approaching and snowstorms halting their progress, Melisandre sacrifices Stannis' daughter, Shireen, to the Lord of Light, in an attempt to ease the weather and grant them safe passage. Instead, Stannis' soldiers lose faith in his cause, and her king is killed after a battle. Melisandre returns to Castle Black in disgrace and finds that Jon Snow has been murdered in a mutiny. Doubting her faith, she hides from Davos and begins wearing winter clothing. Her faith is restored, however, when she manages to resurrect Jon from the dead. Jon marches south to take Winterfell from the Boltons with a wildling army and successfully reclaims the castle. Davos, who had become a guardian to Shireen, discovers that his late friend was burned alive by Melisandre, leading Jon Snow to banish the Red Woman from the North. She arrives at Dragonstone shortly after Daenerys Targaryen and instructs her to summon Jon Snow. She then travels to Volantis, claiming that she will one day return to Westeros to die. Months later, Melisandre returns to Winterfell one last time and uses her magic in the fight against the White Walkers. During the battle, she displays powerful magic, the like of which many of the human combatants have never seen before. Physically exhausted after using the last of her strength to defeat the Army of the Dead, she removes her enchanted necklace, reveals her true withered form to Davos Seaworth, and disappears on the wind.

=== Jeor Mormont ===
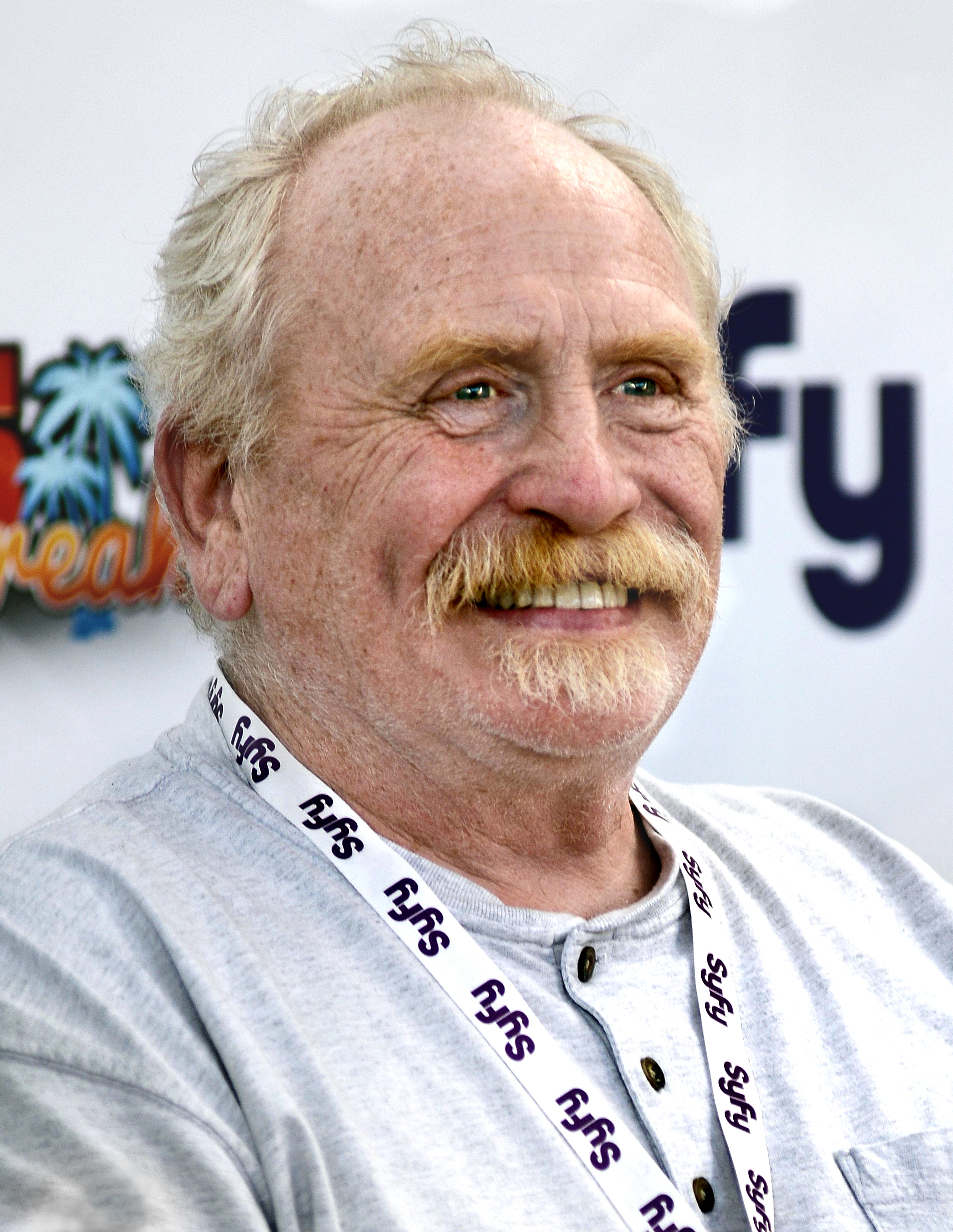
James Cosmo

Jeor Mormont (portrayed by James Cosmo) is the 997th Lord Commander of the Night's Watch, and the estranged father of Ser Jorah. He gave up his lands to serve the Night's Watch. His son's shaming of their house weighs heavily on him. He personally requests that Jon Snow be made his personal steward, and gives him the Hand-and-a-Half sword (also known as a bastard sword) of their house, Longclaw. He has the pommel reshaped into a wolf's head. To investigate the return of wights, the disappearance of several Rangers, and rumors of a wildling army, Jeor leads an expeditionary force beyond the Wall in season 2. In season 3, after returning to Craster's Keep, he is slain by Rast in the ensuing mutiny. His death ignites Maester Aemon's call for the lords of Westeros to aid the Night's Watch, which convinces Stannis Baratheon the time is ripe to fight the onslaught of the White Walkers. His corpse is apparently desecrated afterwards, as in season 4, Karl Tanner is shown drinking wine from a skull he claims is Jeor's.

=== Bronn ===
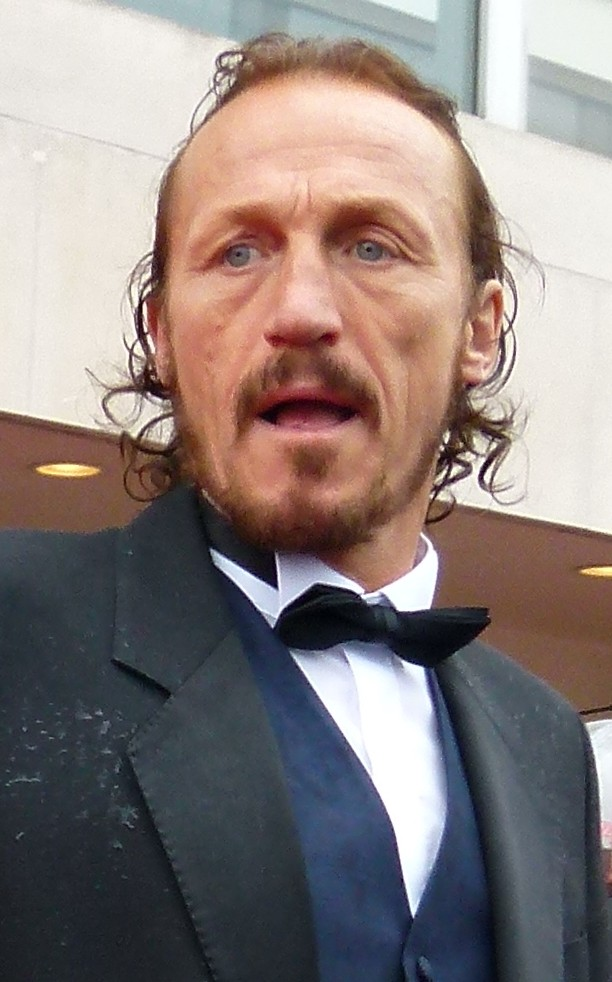
Jerome Flynn

Bronn (portrayed by Jerome Flynn) is a sellsword with a sardonic sense of humor. He is first seen aiding Catelyn Stark when she wrongly arrests Tyrion Lannister for an attempt on her son Brandon's life. During Tyrion's trial at the Eyrie, Bronn volunteers to fight when Tyrion demands a trial by combat. Bronn wins the fight and becomes Tyrion's companion and protector, accompanying him back to King's Landing. When Tyrion is named Hand of the King, Bronn becomes head of the City Watch in the capital. Bronn also becomes an advisor to Tyrion and is named Ser Bronn of the Blackwater after his heroics during the defence of the city from Stannis Baratheon's army. After the battle, Bronn remains in Tyrion's employ as both a colleague and friend. Bronn is later tasked with training up Jaime Lannister's weaker hand with a sword—Jaime having lost his stronger swordhand while a prisoner of the Boltons. When King Joffrey is poisoned, and Tyrion is once again falsely accused of a crime, Bronn is bribed by Cersei to marry Lollys Stokeworth and leave the capital instead of fighting for Tyrion in another trial-by-combat. Tyrion flees the capital after Prince Oberyn Martell fights for him and is killed by The Mountain.

Before Bronn can marry Lollys, however, he reunites with Jaime, who has been tasked with travelling to Dorne to retrieve Myrcella Baratheon from the Martells, who threaten revenge for their prince's death. In their attempts to rescue Myrcella, Bronn and Jaime provoke the Sand Snakes (daughters of the late Oberyn Martell), and Bronn is imprisoned. He is released when Jaime bargains for his freedom. Myrcella is poisoned by Ellaria Sand, despite their efforts to bring her home to King's Landing. Bronn later accompanies Jaime to Riverrun, where the Lannister army retakes the castle from the Tullys, and he also forms part of the force that seizes Highgarden from the Tyrells. Bronn, Jaime, and the rest of the Lannister forces are ambushed by Daenerys Targaryen on the back of her dragon, Drogon. Bronn wounds Drogon during the massacre, but is forced to rescue Jaime from an attack by Daenerys. The pair escape by floating downstream on the Blackwater Rush. After Jaime leaves Cersei Lannister and rides north to face the White Walkers, Bronn stays in King's Landing but is tasked by Cersei with killing Jaime for his apparent betrayal. Instead of carrying out Cersei's orders, however, Bronn uses the threat of death as leverage over Jaime and Tyrion, securing himself a seat on Bran the Broken's small council as Lord of the Reach.

=== Varys ===
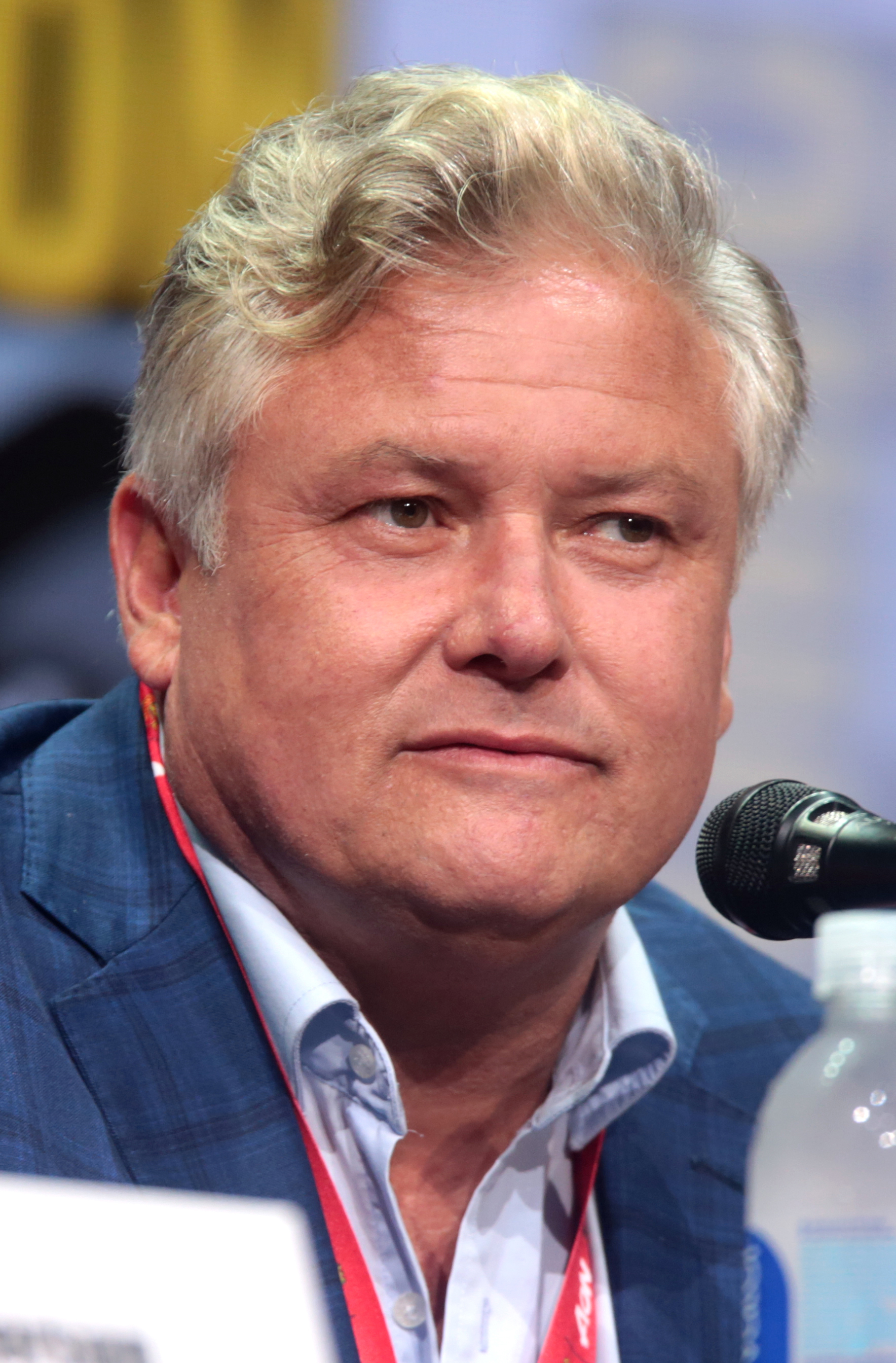
Conleth Hill

Varys (portrayed by Conleth Hill) is a member of the Small Council, serving under King Robert Baratheon, King Joffrey Baratheon, and King Tommen Baratheon. He is also a Master of Whisperers, with many spies in his employ across two continents, and clashes frequently with Petyr "Littlefinger" Baelish. After serving under three kings, Varys flees to Essos with Tyrion Lannister following the latter's murder of his father, Tywin. Once there, Varys arranges for Tyrion to become one of Daenerys Targaryen's advisers. The pair then rule Meereen in her absence following an attack by the rebel group the Sons of the Harpy. When Daenerys returns to defeat the slave masters and the Sons of the Harpy, Varys and Tyrion accompany her to Westeros and support her claim to the Iron Throne. Varys survives the Great War between the living and the dead and discovers that Jon Snow is actually Daenerys' nephew Aegon Targaryen, the rightful heir to the Iron Throne, but he is executed when his plot to crown Jon king is exposed.

=== Shae ===
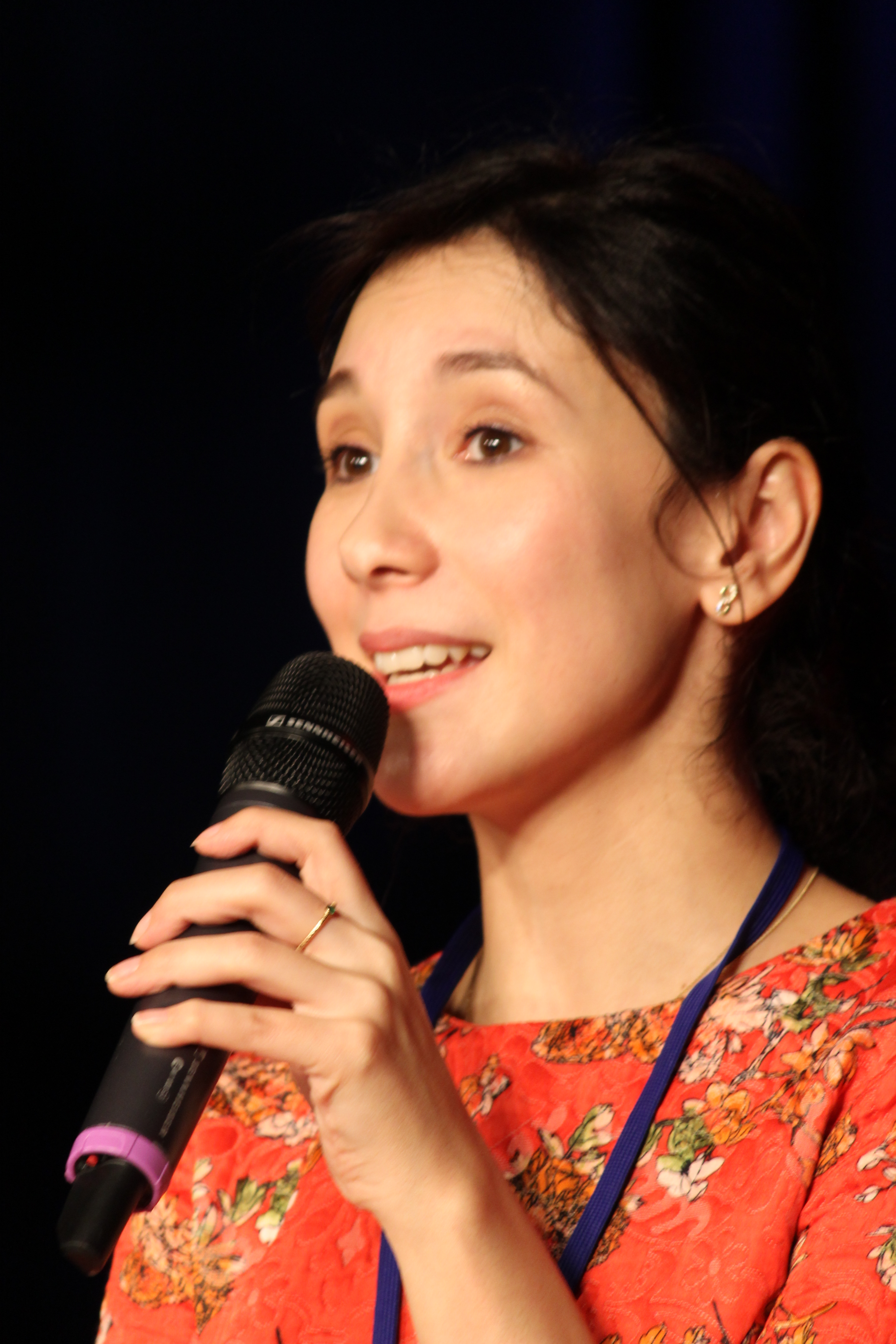
Sibel Kekilli

Shae (portrayed by Sibel Kekilli) is a young camp follower in whom Tyrion Lannister takes particular interest. She is from Lorath, one of the Free Cities across the Narrow Sea. Tyrion falls in love with her and, to hide her from his father, Tyrion appoints Shae to be Sansa's handmaiden. As her handmaiden, Shae is the only person Sansa trusts and confides in about her problems and what she really thinks about the Lannisters. In turn, Shae becomes protective of Sansa and attempts to help her in any way she can. In season 3, she becomes jealous of Tyrion after his marriage to Sansa and is confronted by Varys, who urges her to leave the Seven Kingdoms, which she refuses to do, thinking that Tyrion has something to do with Varys talking to her. In season 4, Tyrion is forced to send Shae away from King's Landing on a ship after her presence is discovered by Cersei and his father is told, insulting her in the process. Shae, however, does not leave King's Landing and resurfaces at Tyrion's trial for murdering Joffrey, where she falsely claims that both Tyrion and Sansa were responsible for Joffrey's death. It is revealed, however, that Shae was having an affair with Tywin. After Tyrion is freed by Jaime, he finds Shae sleeping in Tywin's bed, making him realise the horrible truth. Shae attempts to kill Tyrion with a knife, but he strangles her to death both in self-defense and out of anger for her betrayal.

=== Margaery Tyrell ===
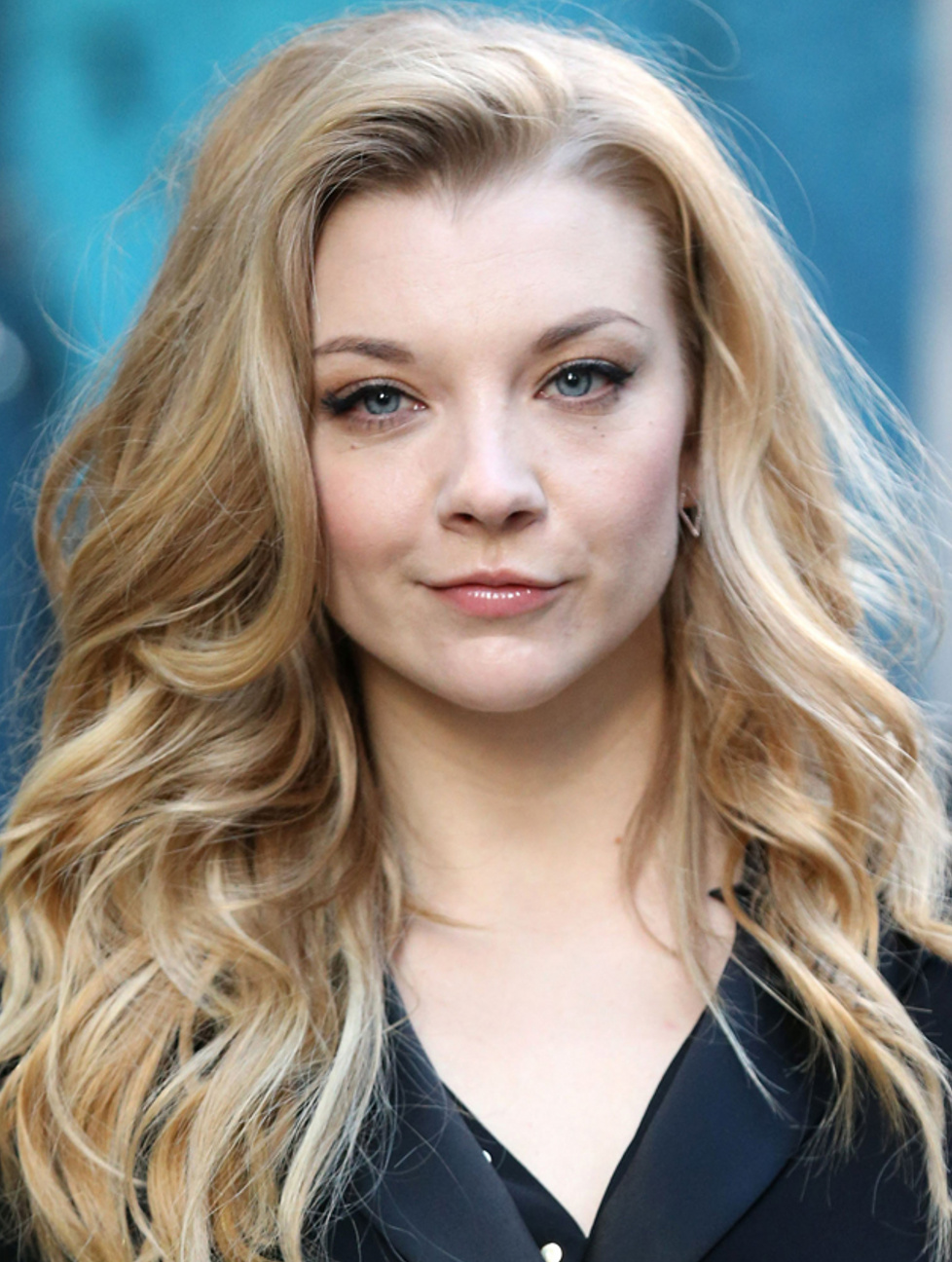
Natalie Dormer

Margaery Tyrell (portrayed by Natalie Dormer) is the only daughter of Lord Mace Tyrell and granddaughter of Lady Olenna Tyrell, as well as the wife of Renly Baratheon when introduced to the series. She is cunning but kind-hearted and dreams of becoming queen. When Renly Baratheon is killed by a shadow demon, Petyr Baelish arranges for the Tyrells to ally with the Lannisters. The Tyrells move to King's Landing, and Margaery is immediately betrothed to the sadistic King Joffrey Baratheon. Margaery and Olenna spend time in the city's gardens, scheming together and organising their political tactics. When Lady Olenna poisons Joffrey at his wedding to Margaery, the timid and innocent King Tommen Baratheon is crowned as his successor. Margaery marries Tommen, and the two become happy together, and Tommen falls deeply in love with Margaery. Their relationship is brief, however. Cersei Lannister gives power to King's Landing's faith militant group, the Sparrows, to challenge the Tyrells' influence in the capital following the death of Tywin Lannister.

Margaery and her brother Loras Tyrell are imprisoned by the Sparrows—Loras for his alleged homosexuality, and Margaery for hiding Loras' secrets. Cersei herself is then arrested by the Sparrows for her incestuous affairs with Lancel Lannister and Jaime Lannister. While a prisoner of the Sparrows, Margaery manipulates their leader, the High Sparrow, into believing that she has converted to the Faith of the Seven. Despite a failed attempt by her family to forcefully remove her from under the High Sparrow's captivity, he comes to enjoy Margaery's company and believes her lies about her faithfulness. In an attempt to soon free herself, Margaery convinces Tommen to join the Crown and the Faith. Her plans are foiled, however, on the day of Cersei Lannister's trial at the Sept of Baelor. Instead of appearing for her trial, Cersei rigs the Sept with wildfire and destroys it, massacring the hundreds of attendees inside—including Margaery, Loras, Mace, Lancel Lannister, the High Sparrow, and several of the King's Landing population. Witnessing the event from his quarters in the Red Keep, Tommen, having seen his wife perish at the hands of his mother, commits suicide by throwing himself from a high window.

=== Tywin Lannister ===
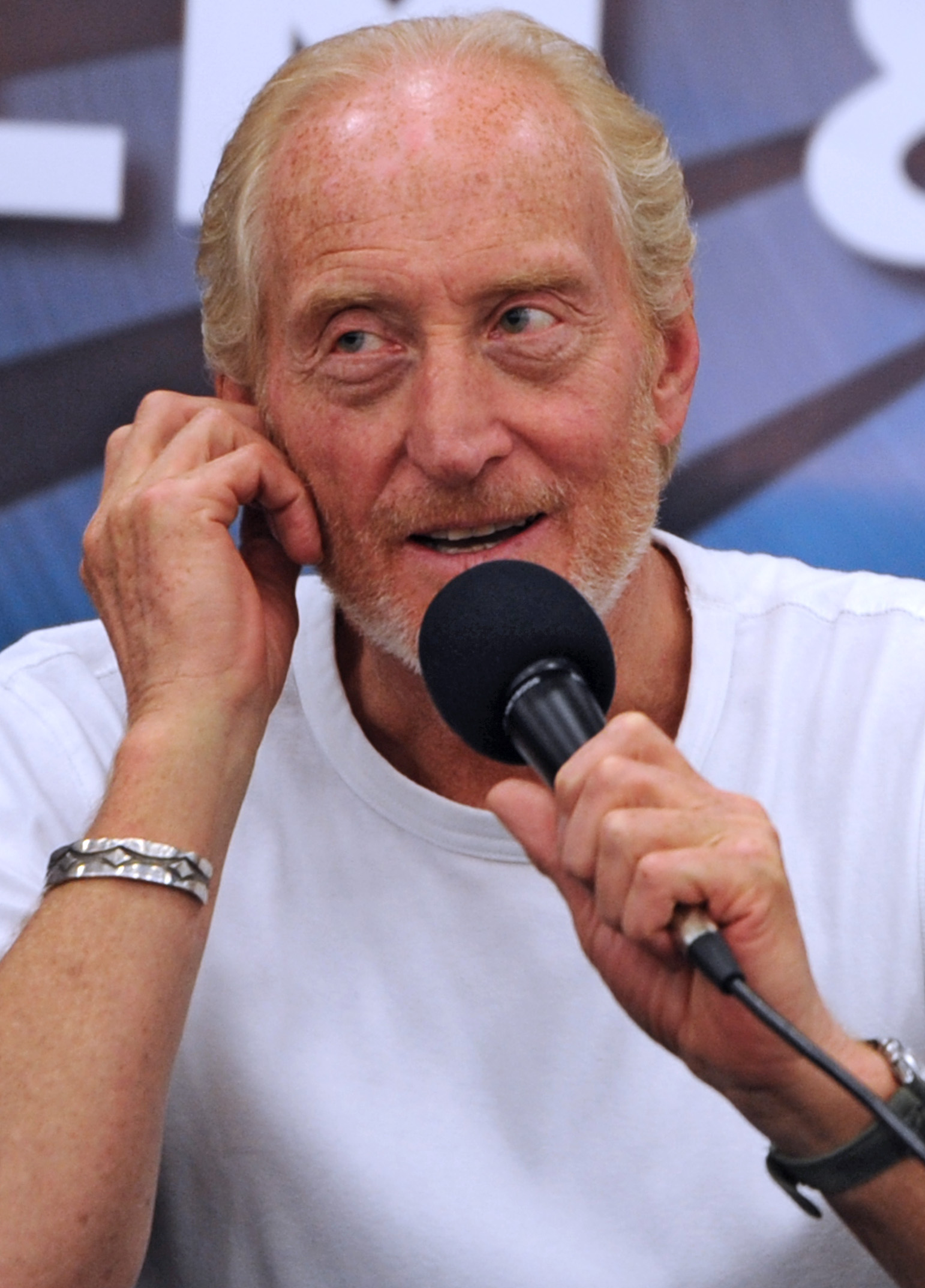
Charles Dance

Tywin Lannister (portrayed by Charles Dance) is the calculating, ruthless, and controlling former Hand of King Aerys II. He is the father of Cersei, Jaime, and Tyrion Lannister. After Eddard Stark's arrest, Joffrey names him Hand of the King once more, but after Jaime is taken captive by the Starks, Eddard is unexpectedly executed by Joffrey, and Renly and Stannis Baratheon challenge Joffrey's claim to the throne. Tywin elects to remain in the field, commanding his forces until he wins his war, and in the meantime gives the position of acting Hand of the King to Tyrion. During the War of Five Kings, Tywin briefly stays at Harrenhal, a castle and prison controlled by the Lannisters. There, he names a captive Arya Stark as his cupbearer, though it is left uncertain as to whether he knows her true identity. After Renly's death, Tywin brokers an alliance with Mace Tyrell, and the pair arrive in King's Landing to quash Stannis Baratheon's army, who are on the cusp of taking the city. In the aftermath of the battle, he is named Hand of the King once more, while Tyrion is demoted to Master of Coin. Tywin arranges several marriages of his children, ends the war by securing the betrayal of Lords Frey and Bolton against Robb Stark, who is slain, but quarrels with Tyrion, now demoted to Master of Coin, and faces problems from an increasingly self-assured King Joffrey. After Joffrey's murder, Tyrion is falsely accused, and after a failed gambit through trial by combat, Tywin sentences his son to death. Once Tywin confirms to Jaime that he intends to have his son executed, the latter - with Lord Varys's help - frees Tyrion and helps him escape from King's Landing, which he does, but not before confronting and murdering his father with a crossbow mid-flight.

=== Talisa Maegyr ===
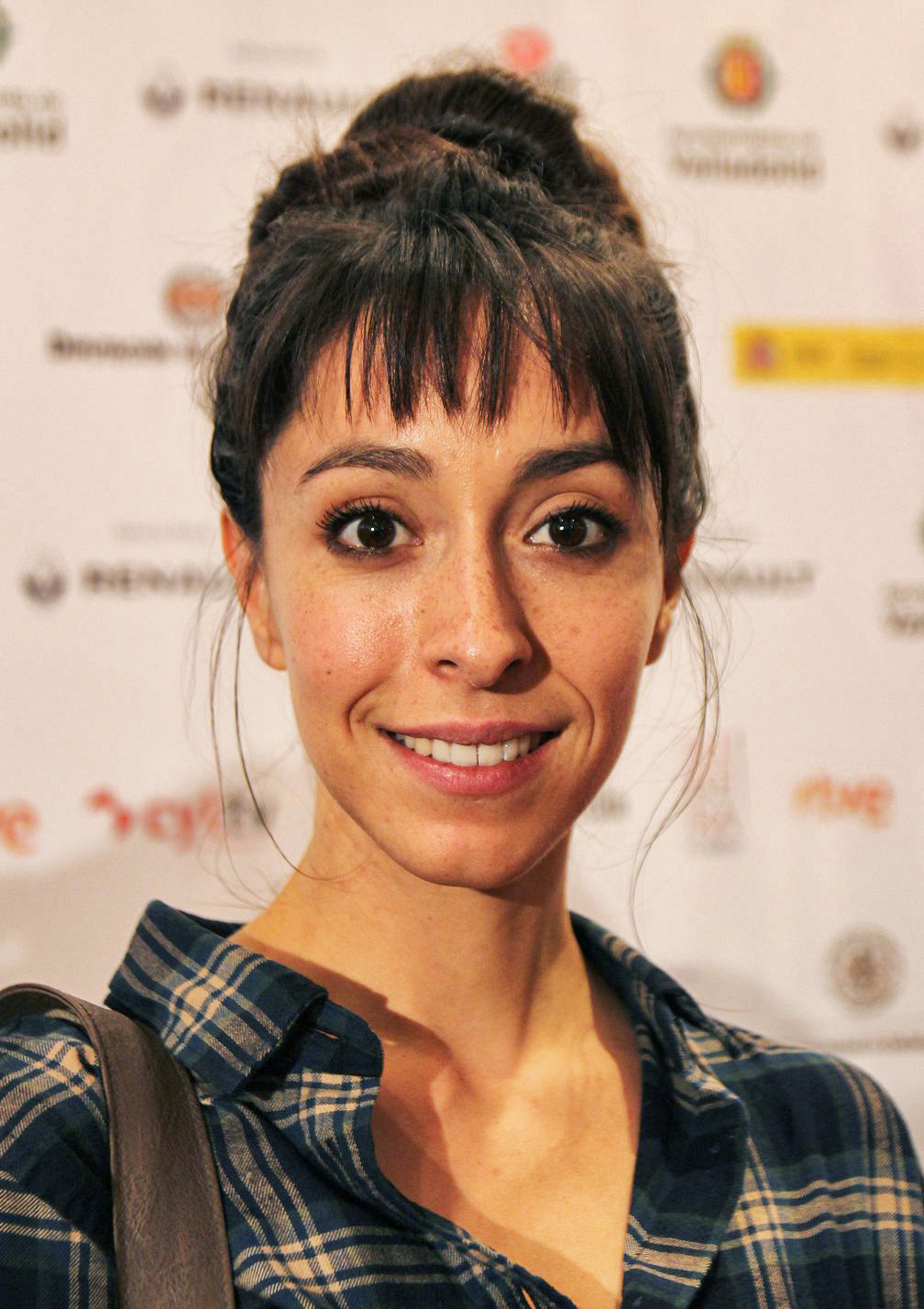
Oona Chaplin

Talisa Stark (portrayed by Oona Chaplin) is a healer working on the battlefields of the War of the Five Kings. She claims to be from the Free City of Volantis. No character named Talisa appears in the books. Oona Chaplin was originally announced to play a character called Jeyne, which many thought to mean she would play Jeyne Westerling, a character from the books. Talisa follows Robb Stark's army camp as it moves. One day, as they talk, they are interrupted by news that Catelyn has released Robb's key prisoner, Jaime Lannister. Talisa later goes to comfort Robb. After she reveals more of her past to him, they admit their shared feelings for one another and sleep together. Talisa and Robb marry in secret before a septon, and she becomes a Stark. In season 3, Talisa reveals that she is pregnant, although she and her unborn child are stabbed to death by Lothar Frey in the Red Wedding Massacre, the first in the hall to be attacked.

=== Ygritte ===
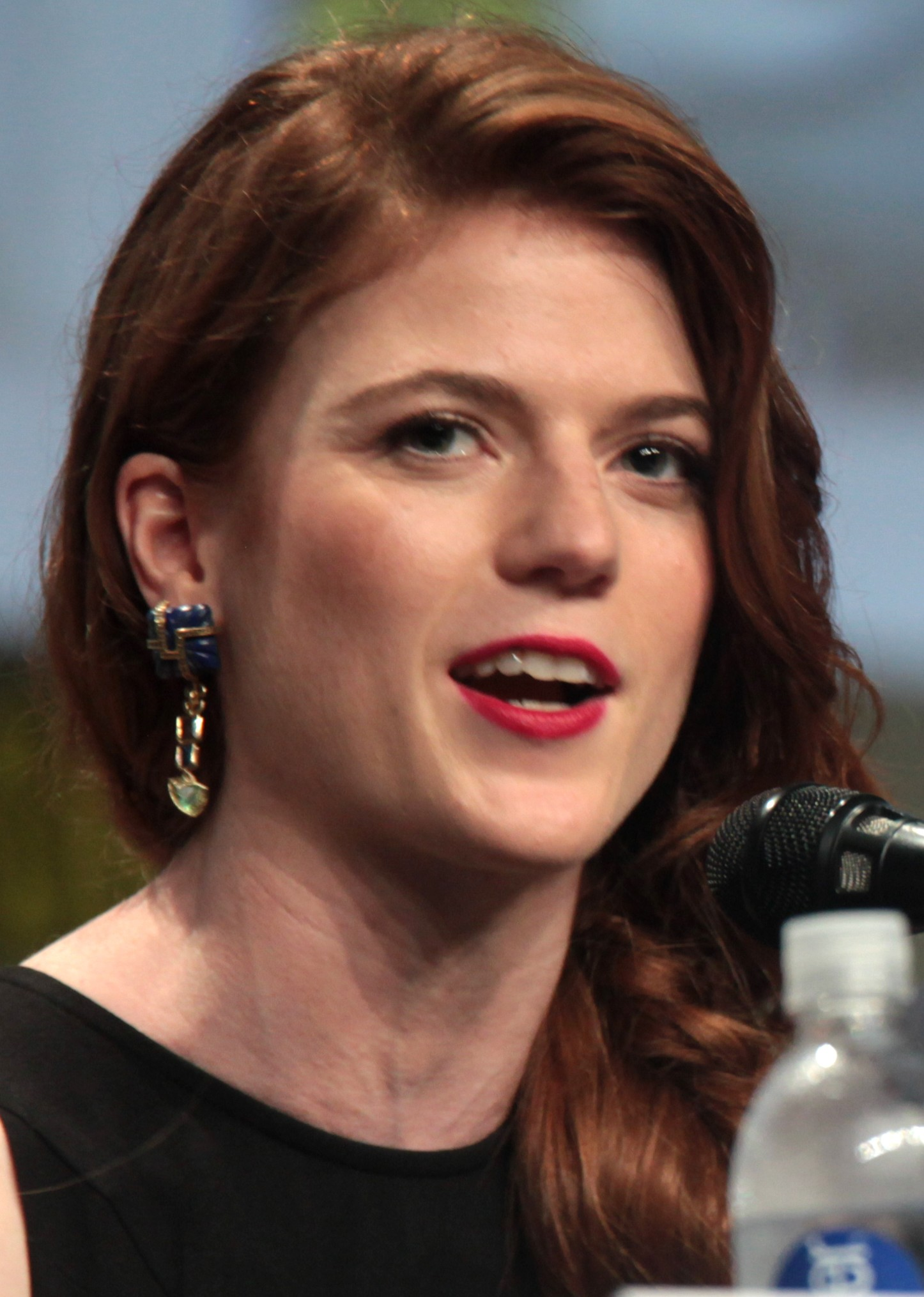
Rose Leslie

Ygritte (portrayed by Rose Leslie) is a Wildling girl with red hair ("kissed by fire", a sign of luck among the Wildlings) and a follower of Mance Rayder. In season 2, she is captured in the Skirling Pass by Jon Snow and Qhorin Halfhand. She manages to escape, but is recaptured by Jon, separating him from his brothers in the process. Later, she leads him into Rattleshirt's ambush. After this, they lead Jon to Mance Rayder's wildling camp, where he pretends to defect to the Wildlings to discover their plans. She then travels with him to the Wall, and during this journey she seduces him. However, when confronted with killing an innocent horse farmer for the Watch who scaled the wall, Jon escapes the Wildlings' clutches on horseback. But while resting, Ygritte manages to catch up with Jon, at which point she confesses her love for him and then, blinded by tears, shoots him multiple times while he escapes towards the Wall. In season 4, Ygritte starts raiding villages south of the Wall with her group, clearly thirsting for vengeance against Jon, although Tormund suspects she let him go. When the wildlings attack Mole's Town, Ygritte slaughters all the women present, but notices Gilly hiding with her baby son, and spares her life. When the wildlings finally reach Castle Black and attack, Ygritte kills many Night's Watch brothers with her archery skills, among them Pyp. When confronted by Jon, however, she cannot bring herself to shoot him, and is shot in the back by Olly, a boy whose father Ygritte previously killed. Ygritte subsequently dies in Jon's arms, and her body is later burned by Jon himself, separately from the other soldiers, in her homeland, north of the Wall.

=== Gendry ===
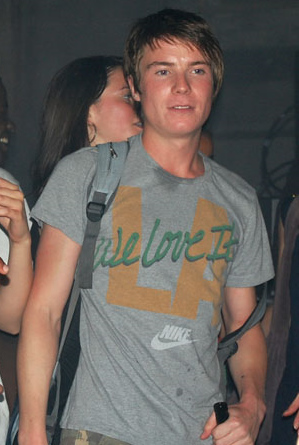
Joe Dempsie

Gendry (portrayed by Joe Dempsie) is an apprentice blacksmith in King's Landing and King Robert Baratheon's bastard son. After King Robert's death and Eddard Stark's execution, arrangements are made for Gendry to travel to Castle Black with Arya (disguised as "Arry") and other Night's Watch recruits. During their journey, Gendry discovers Arya's true identity and the two form a close friendship. After Lannister soldiers ambush them and hold them captive at Harrenhal, Gendry and Arya escape with the help of Jaqen H'ghar. They soon encounter the Brotherhood without Banners, who later sell Gendry to Lady Melisandre, separating him from Arya. Melisandre takes Gendry to Dragonstone and uses his king's blood to turn the War of Five Kings in the favour of Gendry's uncle, Stannis Baratheon. Gendry is then freed by Ser Davos Seaworth, Stannis' Hand, and returns to King's Landing by rowboat. Years later, Davos, now in Jon Snow's service, returns to the capital and finds Gendry working as a smith once more. Davos recruits Gendry to go beyond the Wall with Jon and the remaining members of the Brotherhood to capture a wight and prove the existence of White Walkers. Gendry survives the mission and returns to Winterfell, where he reunites with Arya and helps defeat the Army of the Dead. After the battle, Gendry is legitimised by Daenerys Targaryen and named Lord of Storm's End. He is present at the coronation of King Bran the Broken.

=== Tormund Giantsbane ===
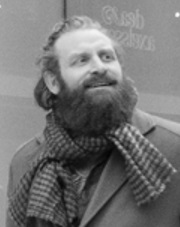
Kristofer Hivju

Tormund Giantsbane (portrayed by Kristofer Hivju) is a wildling raider known for his many titles, "Giantsbane" being foremost. Loud and gregarious, he is one of Mance's top generals, fierce and terrible in combat. Tormund takes a liking to Jon Snow after he joins them and even gives him advice over his relationship with Ygritte. After Mance Rayder's army attacks Castle Black, Tormund is taken as a prisoner, where he forms a stronger bond with Jon and agrees to help the Lord Commander form a truce between the wildlings and the Night's Watch. The pair travel to Hardhome and survive an attack by the White Walkers while rescuing wildlings. After Jon is assassinated in a mutiny, Tormund is present when the Lady Melisandre resurrects him, and forms part of the army Jon uses to reclaim Winterfell from House Bolton. Tormund is then stationed at Eastwatch-by-the-Sea, and goes beyond the Wall with Jon to capture a wight and prove the existence of White Walkers to Queen Cersei Lannister. Tormund survives an attack on Eastwatch by the Night King, and makes it to Winterfell in time to join the effort to defeat the Army of the Dead. After the battle, Tormund returns to Castle Black. At the end of the series, he eventually reunites with Jon Snow, following Jon's extradition after assassinating Daenerys Targaryen.

=== Brienne of Tarth ===
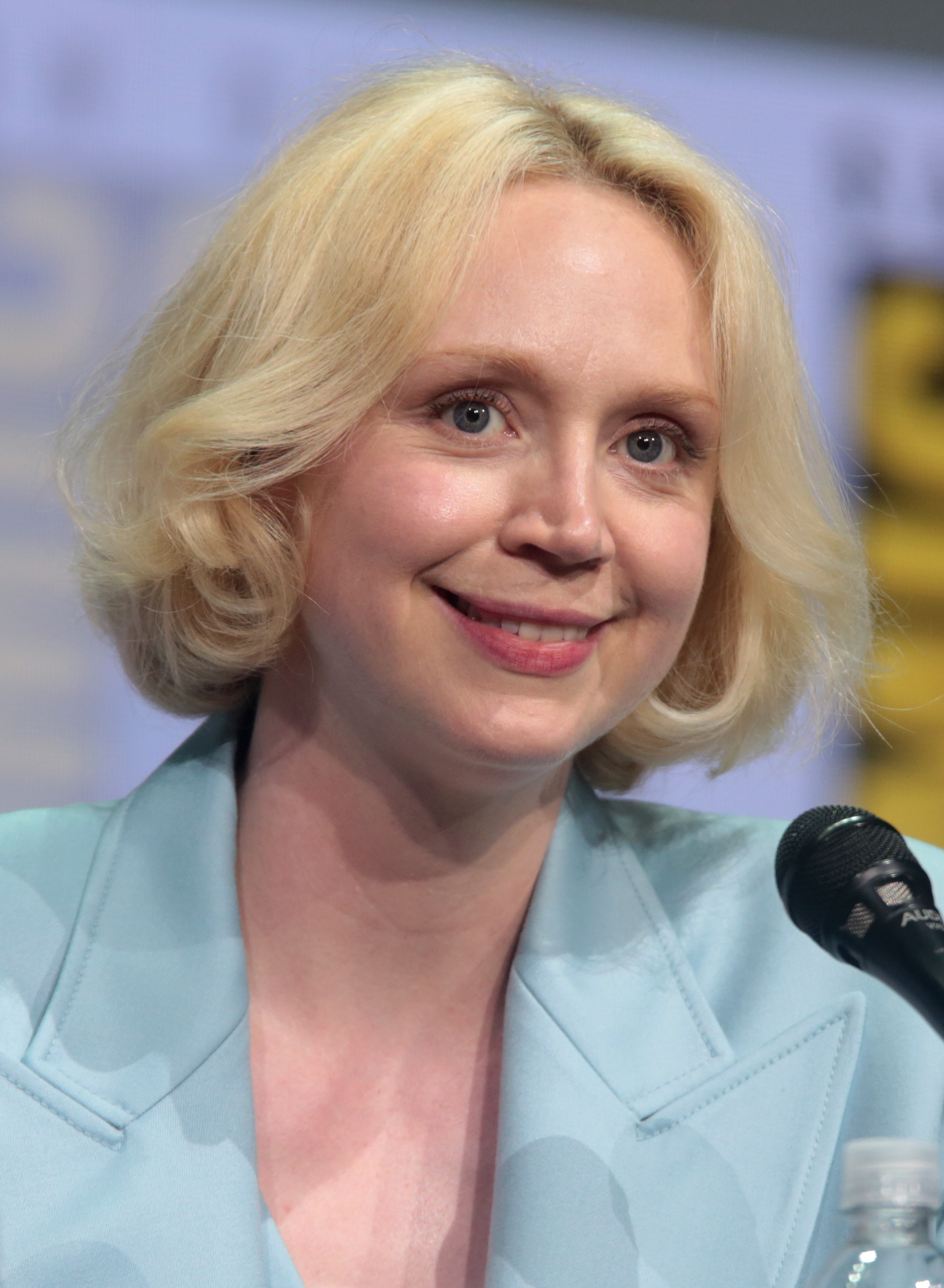
Gwendoline Christie

Brienne of Tarth (portrayed by Gwendoline Christie) is a former member of Renly Baratheon's Kingsguard. She is a highly trained, skilled warrior, made even more dangerous by the fact that men underestimate her. She is considered unfashionable because of her physique. She is present when Renly Baratheon is murdered by a shadow demon, and is falsely accused of carrying out the deed. She flees with Catelyn Stark, who was also present when Renly was killed, and is sworn into her service. Brienne swears to take revenge on Stannis Baratheon, who created the shadow demon that killed her king. Brienne is tasked by Catelyn with escorting Jaime Lannister back to King's Landing in exchange for the release of Catelyn's daughters, Sansa and Arya. On the road, however, Brienne and Jaime are captured by soldiers working for House Bolton, and Jaime's sword hand is severed. Brienne is kept at the prison fortress of Harrenhal to entertain the Bolton soldiers by fighting a bear—Jaime rescues her from the bear pit and the pair soon return to King's Landing. After King Joffrey's murder by poison, Brienne is sent away from King's Landing to find Sansa and Arya, both of whom escaped the capital without her knowledge.

Travelling to the Eyrie to find the Stark girls, Brienne encounters Sandor Clegane and his travelling companion, Arya Stark. Unable to persuade Arya to join her, and after defeating Sandor in single combat, Brienne travels with Podrick to Winterfell, where Sansa Stark has surfaced after escaping King's Landing. Brienne briefly abandons her mission to locate Sansa to execute Stannis Baratheon, who fails to capture Winterfell, but unites with the Stark girl soon after. Sansa, Brienne and Podrick ride to Castle Black, where Sansa reunites with her brother, Jon Snow. Brienne is sent to Riverrun to request that Brynden Tully's army assist Sansa and Jon in reclaiming Winterfell. Upon arrival, she briefly reunites with Jaime but is unable to convince Brynden to ride north and help Sansa. She returns to Winterfell after Sansa and Jon reclaim the castle anyway, and is present when Sansa and Arya reunite at the fortress, technically fulfilling her oath to Catelyn Stark. She journeys to King's Landing to represent Sansa in the Dragonpit summit and then returns to Winterfell to face the Army of the Dead, reuniting with Jaime Lannister. After Jaime is killed when Daenerys Targaryen destroys King's Landing, Brienne journeys south and is named head of Bran the Broken's Kingsguard.

=== Ramsay Bolton ===
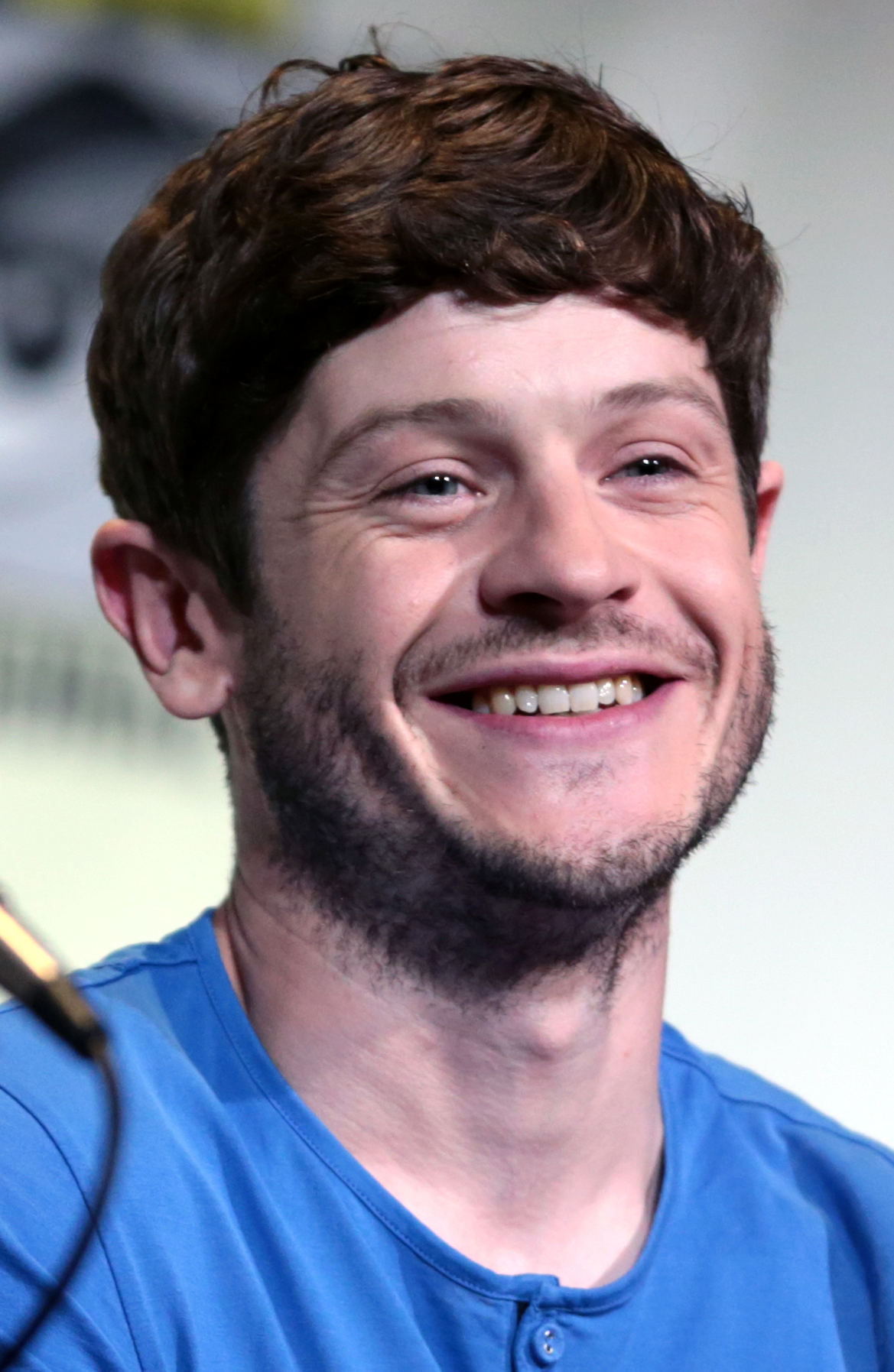
Iwan Rheon

Ramsay Bolton (portrayed by Iwan Rheon) is the cruel, sadistic, and cunning illegitimate son of Roose Bolton. He is first introduced to the series when Theon Greyjoy captures Winterfell, and Roose Bolton commands him to retake the fortress, ostensibly to hand it back to the Starks. However, Ramsay's army ransacks the castle and leaves it as a ruin. Ramsay captures Theon, imprisons him at the Dreadfort, and tortures him so severely that Theon forgets his own name, eventually believing himself to be called "Reek". Ramsay even goes so far as to emasculate Reek. After capturing Moat Cailin, the Boltons move from the Dreadfort to Winterfell. Roose is named Warden of the North and legitimizes Ramsay, making him Ramsay Bolton. Sansa Stark is then married to Ramsay, thanks to an arrangement made by Petyr Baelish in his own attempt to control the North. Ramsay abuses and violates Sansa, raping her on their wedding night.

After Sansa and Theon escape Ramsay's captivity during Stannis Baratheon's failed attack on Winterfell, Roose chastises Ramsay for his complacency and implies that legitimizing him was a mistake. After Roose's wife Walda gives birth to a legitimate heir, Ramsay quickly arranges for his father's assassination. With the Karstarks willing to hide the information, Ramsay stabs Roose through the heart, feeds Roose's wife and son to his hounds, and assumes the title of Lord Bolton. Shortly after, House Umber arrives at Winterfell with two prisoners: Rickon Stark and Osha. Osha is killed when trying to assassinate Ramsay herself. When Jon Snow's wildling army descends on Winterfell to take the castle, Rickon is killed after being used as bait to disrupt Jon's tactics. After a battle, Ramsay is defeated in the field by a combination of the wildling army and the Knights of the Vale, who arrive on the orders of Petyr Baelish and Sansa Stark. He is captured and chained up in the Winterfell kennels, where Sansa watches him get eaten alive by his own hounds.

=== Gilly ===
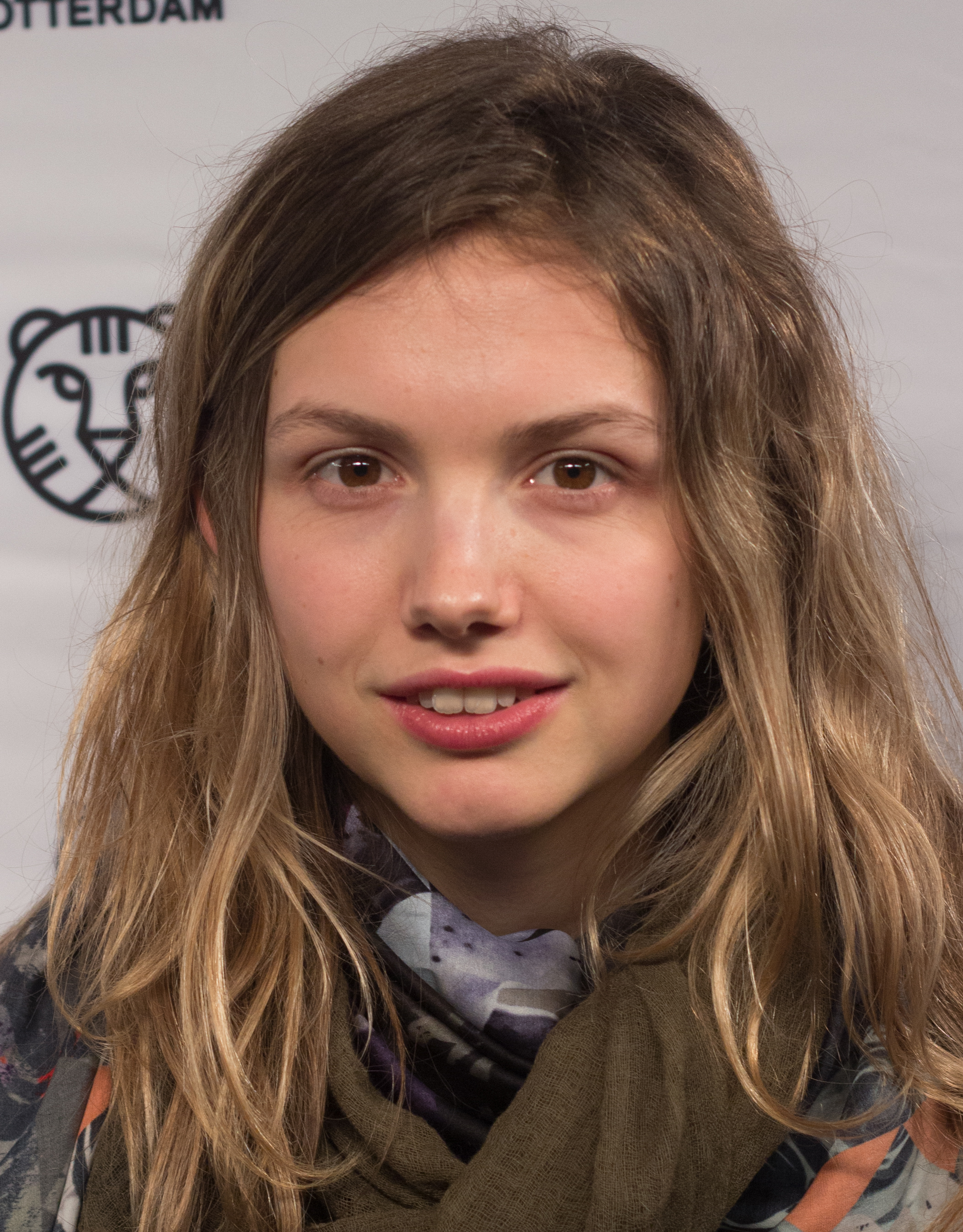
Hannah Murray

Gilly (portrayed by Hannah Murray) is a young wildling girl who lives north of the Wall, and one of many daughters of Craster, a wildling who takes all his daughters as wives once they grow up into women. During the Night's Watch's Great Ranging beyond the Wall, Gilly encounters Samwell Tarly, a Night's Watch brother. She is pregnant, and soon gives birth to Craster's son. Fearing for her son's life, knowing that Craster's sons are handed to the White Walkers, she flees with Samwell during a violent mutiny at Craster's Keep, during which Craster and the Night's Watch's Lord Commander, Jeor Mormont, are both killed. Gilly and Samwell, along with the baby (known as "Little Sam"), hike back to the Wall. Along the way, a White Walker comes to claim Little Sam, only for Samwell to stab the Walker with a dragonglass dagger. After returning to Castle Black, Samwell begins to fear for Gilly's safety and instead finds her work in Mole's Town, a nearby settlement. When Mole's Town is attacked by wildlings, Gilly returns to Castle Black and survives the attack by Mance Rayder's wildling army. After Maester Aemon falls ill and dies, Samwell and Gilly travel south to the Citadel, where Samwell trains to become the new maester of the Night's Watch. After a brief stopover with his family at Horn Hill, Samwell takes Gilly to the Citadel. When Samwell grows frustrated with the maesters, Gilly travels back northwards with him, and the trio settles at Winterfell. Gilly then survives the attack by White Walkers and declares that she is pregnant with Samwell's baby in the aftermath. When Samwell is named the maester on Bran the Broken's small council, it is presumed that Gilly and Little Sam travel with him and take up permanent residence in King's Landing.

=== Daario Naharis ===
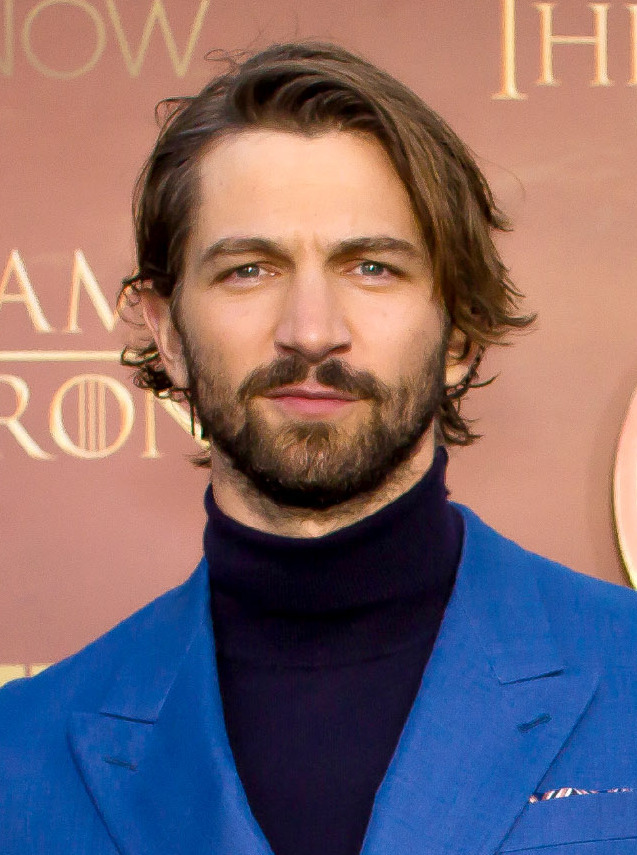
Michiel Huisman

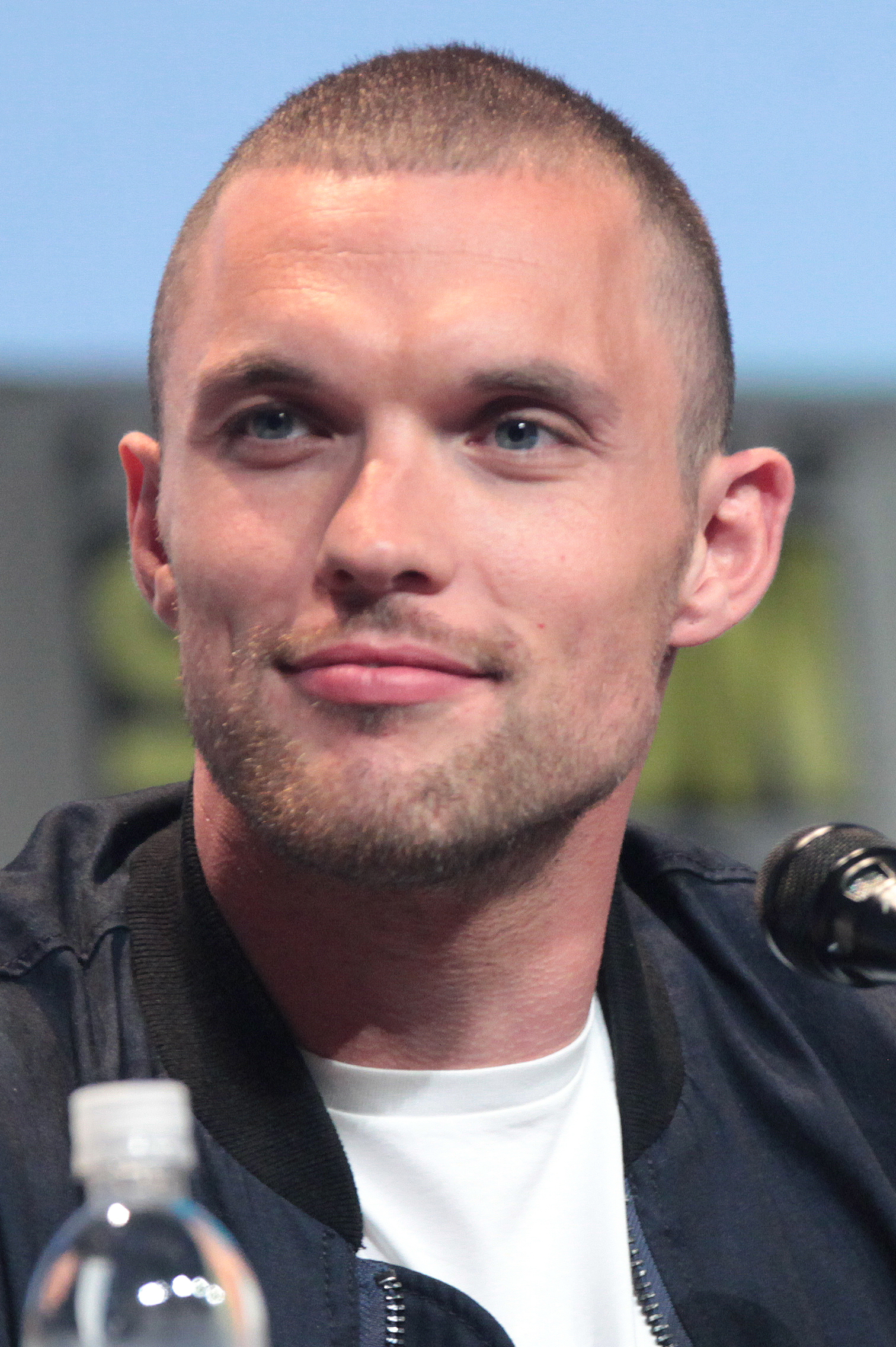
Ed Skrein

Daario Naharis (portrayed by Ed Skrein in season 3, and by Michiel Huisman from season 4 onwards) is a confident and seductive warrior who is a lieutenant in the Second Sons, a group of 2000 mercenaries. Daario is introduced when Daenerys Targaryen attempts to seize the slave city of Yunkai; she hires the Second Sons to help her conquer the city. Daario murders his fellow commanders after they consider turning against Daenerys, and declares his loyalty to her, helping her to take the city. When Daenerys takes Meereen, Daario defeats the city's champion and grants her entry to the city. Daario then joins Daenerys' advisory team and soon becomes her romantic partner. During their relationship, he investigates the origins of the Sons of the Harpy, a militant group who object to Daenerys' rule in Meereen. When Daenerys is forced to flee the city and is captured by the Dothraki, Daario journeys with Ser Jorah Mormont to retrieve her from Vaes Dothrak. When Daenerys returns to Meereen, she begins making plans to leave for Westeros. Daario helps her defeat the Sons of the Harpy and the region's slave masters. Having created a fragile peace in Slaver's Bay, she assigns Daario and the Second Sons the responsibility of maintaining order. Daario is upset by this news, as staying in Meereen means the end of his relationship with Daenerys, but it is presumed that he rules the city in her stead.

=== Missandei ===
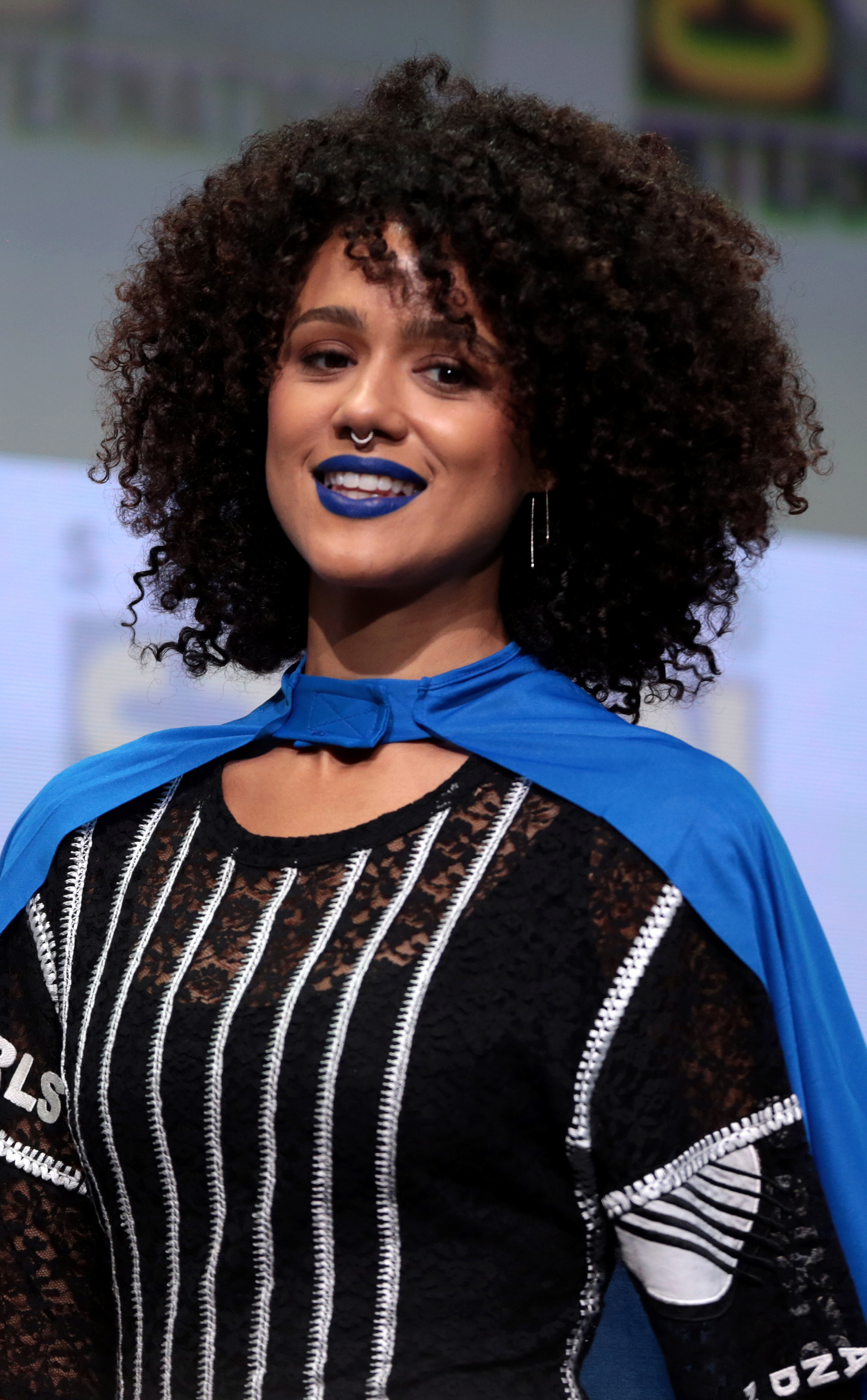
Nathalie Emmanuel

Missandei (portrayed by Nathalie Emmanuel) is a personal servant to Daenerys Targaryen, who was freed from being a slave working as translator for Kraznys mo Nakloz when Daenerys insisted during negotiations with Kraznys mo Nakloz that Missandei be given to her as a gift. She effectively serves as the replacement for Doreah after she betrayed Daenerys in Qarth. She later begins to teach Grey Worm how to speak the common tongue, and they develop romantic feelings for each other, despite Grey Worm being an Unsullied who was castrated in youth. She is visibly saddened when another Unsullied, White Rat, is killed in a brothel by the Sons of the Harpy. After Grey Worm is almost killed in an attack, Missandei kisses him after he reveals that, for the first time, he felt fear, since he thought he would never see her again. On the opening day of the fighting games, the Sons of the Harpy launch another attack. Missandei is narrowly saved by Tyrion Lannister and watches as Daenerys flies away on Drogon. She later remains in Meereen with Tyrion and Grey Worm to help keep the city together. Despite an attack by the slavers' fleet, Meereen is saved when Daenerys returns with the Dothraki and unleashes her dragons on the fleet, which Missandei witnesses. She later accompanies Daenerys on her voyage back to Westeros. She makes love with Grey Worm and worries for him when he is sent to attack Casterly Rock. In season 8, she is beheaded by the Mountain under Cersei's orders.

=== Ellaria Sand ===
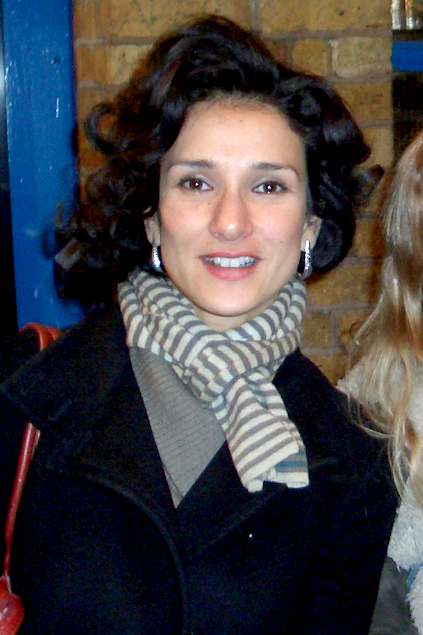
Indira Varma

Ellaria Sand (portrayed by Indira Varma) is the sexually promiscuous paramour of Oberyn Martell, and a bastard from Dorne. She is also the mother of several daughters, known collectively as the Sand Snakes. She is present at Tyrion's trial by combat, where Oberyn fights Gregor Clegane in Tyrion's name, and is horrified when Oberyn is killed. Upon Oberyn's death, she returns to Dorne. There, she implores Prince Doran to declare war on the Lannisters as revenge for Oberyn's death at the hands of the Lannisters. Soon after, when Jaime Lannister arrives in Dorne on a secret mission to free Princess Myrcella from Sunspear, Ellaria and the Sand Snakes duel with Jaime and Bronn, resulting in the imprisonment of Bronn and the Sand Snakes. A truce is agreed, and Ellaria abandons her plan to take revenge on the Lannisters when Prince Doran allows Jaime, Myrcella, and Bronn to return to King's Landing. However, it is revealed that Ellaria poisoned Myrcella upon her departure, sent two of the Sand Snakes to kill Prince Trystane (Myrcella's betrothed), and had been secretly plotting to assassinate Prince Doran - three secret missions she successfully organises. She later allies with Daenerys Targaryen and the Tyrells against the Lannisters, but is captured and imprisoned by Euron Greyjoy and Cersei Lannister while two of her daughters are killed. Her death is never shown on-screen, but it is presumed that she starves in the dungeons of King's Landing along with her last remaining daughter, Tyene.

=== Tommen Baratheon ===
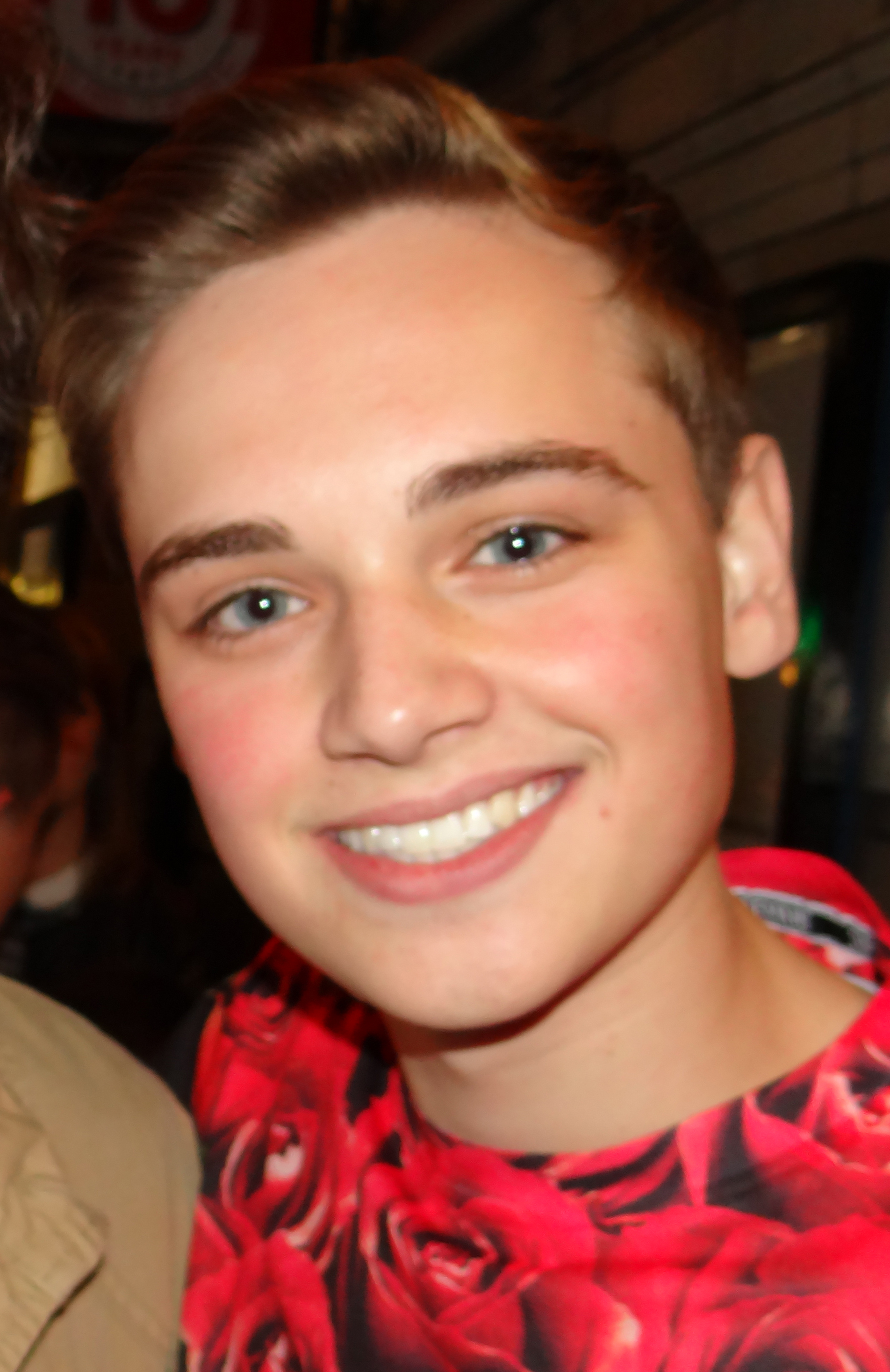
Dean-Charles Chapman

Tommen Baratheon (portrayed by Callum Wharry in seasons 1 and 2, and by Dean-Charles Chapman from season 4 onwards) is the prince presented as the youngest son of King Robert Baratheon and Queen Cersei Lannister. Like his older siblings Joffrey and Myrcella, his actual father is his uncle Ser Jaime Lannister. Like his sister, he is good-natured and passive, in contrast to his brother Joffrey, and is fond of his uncle Tyrion. When King Joffrey is poisoned at his own wedding, Tommen assumes the throne and marries Margaery Tyrell. His mother Cersei battles Margaery for influence over Tommen, and their subsequent war of words eventually results in Margaery and Cersei's arrest by the High Sparrow. After Cersei's temporary release ahead of her trial in front of the Faith Militant, she destroys the Sept of Baelor with wildfire, killing several people inside, including Margaery. Witnessing the event, Tommen, deeply in love with Margaery and heartbroken by her death, leaps from a high window in the Red Keep to his death.

=== Jaqen H'ghar ===
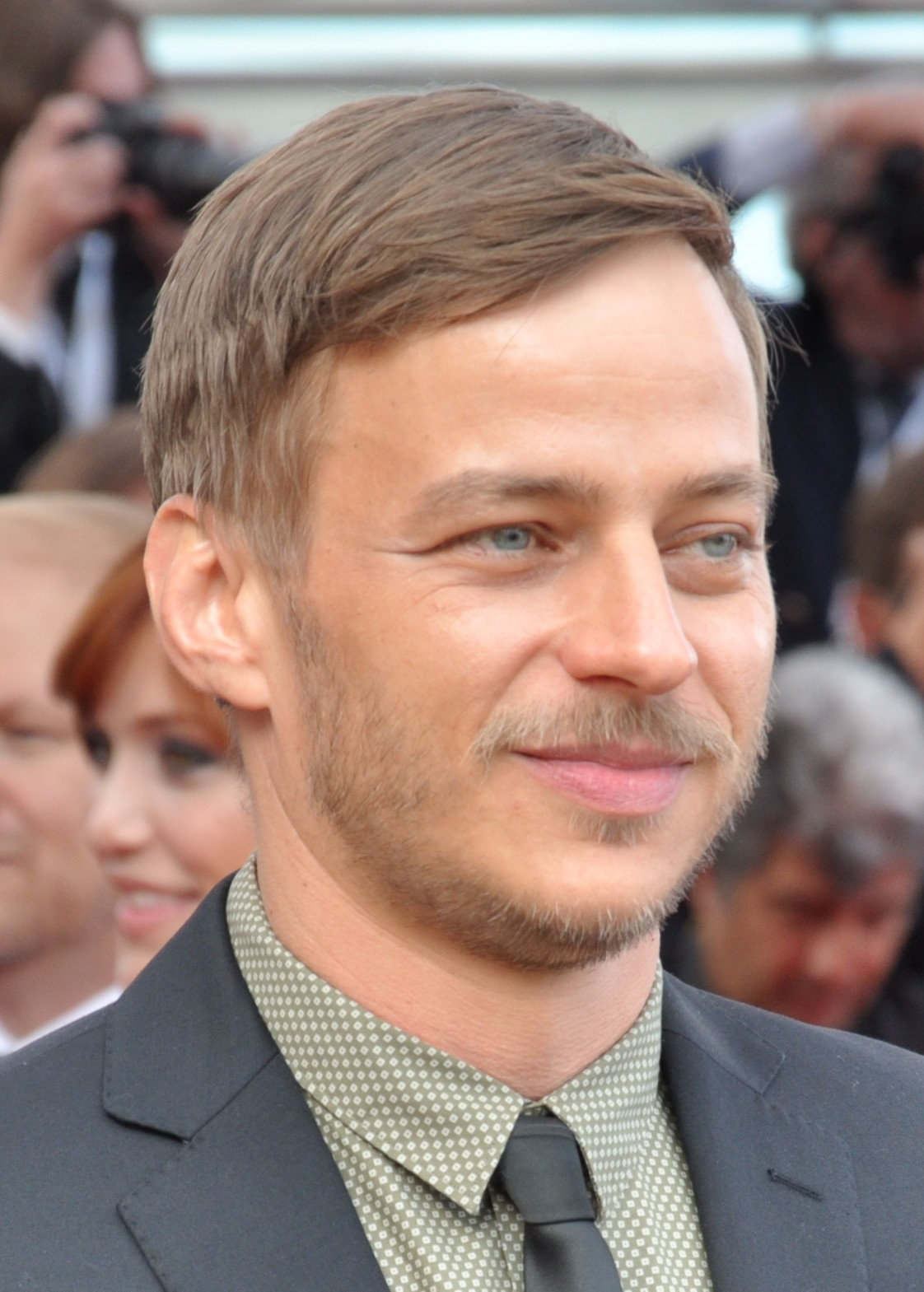
Tom Wlaschiha

"Jaqen H'ghar" (portrayed by Tom Wlaschiha) is a sly and enigmatic criminal and part of Yoren's group of recruits taken from King's Landing to join the Night's Watch. A foreigner from Braavos, though he originally claims Lorath, he speaks in third person, referring to himself as "a man". When Arya Stark is taken as one of the Lannisters' prisoners at Harrenhal, Jaqen teaches her the ways of the Faceless Men and helps her to escape. He leaves Arya with an iron coin and tells her that, should she ever meet a man from Braavos, she should present the coin to him and repeat the words "Valar Morghulis". A year later, Arya reunites with Jaqen in Braavos. He inducts her into the order of the Faceless Men and once again takes her under his wing, with the Faceless Men being revealed as assassins who use the faces of the dead to change their appearance. Jaqen gives Arya various tasks to complete, and either punishes her for her disobedience or rewards her for her skills. Jaqen later informs Arya that she has become "no one" and is ready to join the Faceless Men, but his offer is rejected as Arya travels back to Westeros.

=== Roose Bolton ===
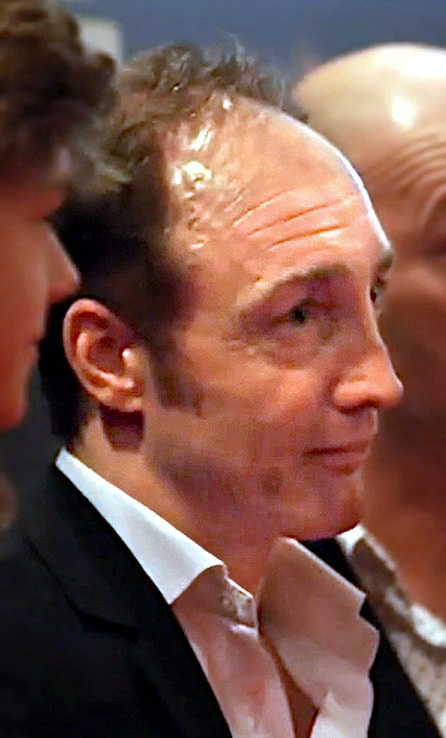
Michael McElhatton

Roose Bolton (portrayed by Michael McElhatton) is a Bannerman of the North and Lord of the Dreadfort. The Bolton family has a nasty history of keeping to very old and barbaric ways, including flaying their enemies alive, and Roose is no exception, being suspected of not feeling any emotion. His cunning makes him a valuable ally, but his unpredictable nature makes him a dangerous one. Roose serves as a chief member of Robb Stark's war council. At the Red Wedding, Roose betrays Robb and stabs him in the heart. He is later made the Warden of the North by King Tommen Baratheon. Following the birth of his newborn son, he is killed by his bastard son Ramsay Bolton.

=== The High Sparrow ===
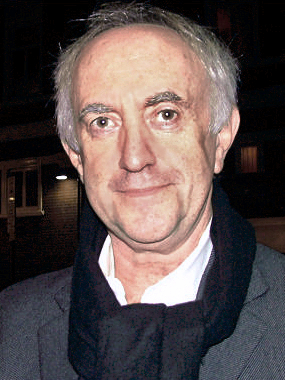
Jonathan Pryce

The High Sparrow (portrayed by Jonathan Pryce) is a devout and pious man who came to King's Landing after Tywin Lannister's death to serve the poor, downtrodden, and infirm. He quickly amasses a large following, including Cersei's cousin and former lover Lancel, who swarm over the city, ministering to the needy and denouncing corruption. He is first noticed by Cersei Lannister when his followers assault and humiliate the High Septon at a brothel.

=== Grey Worm ===
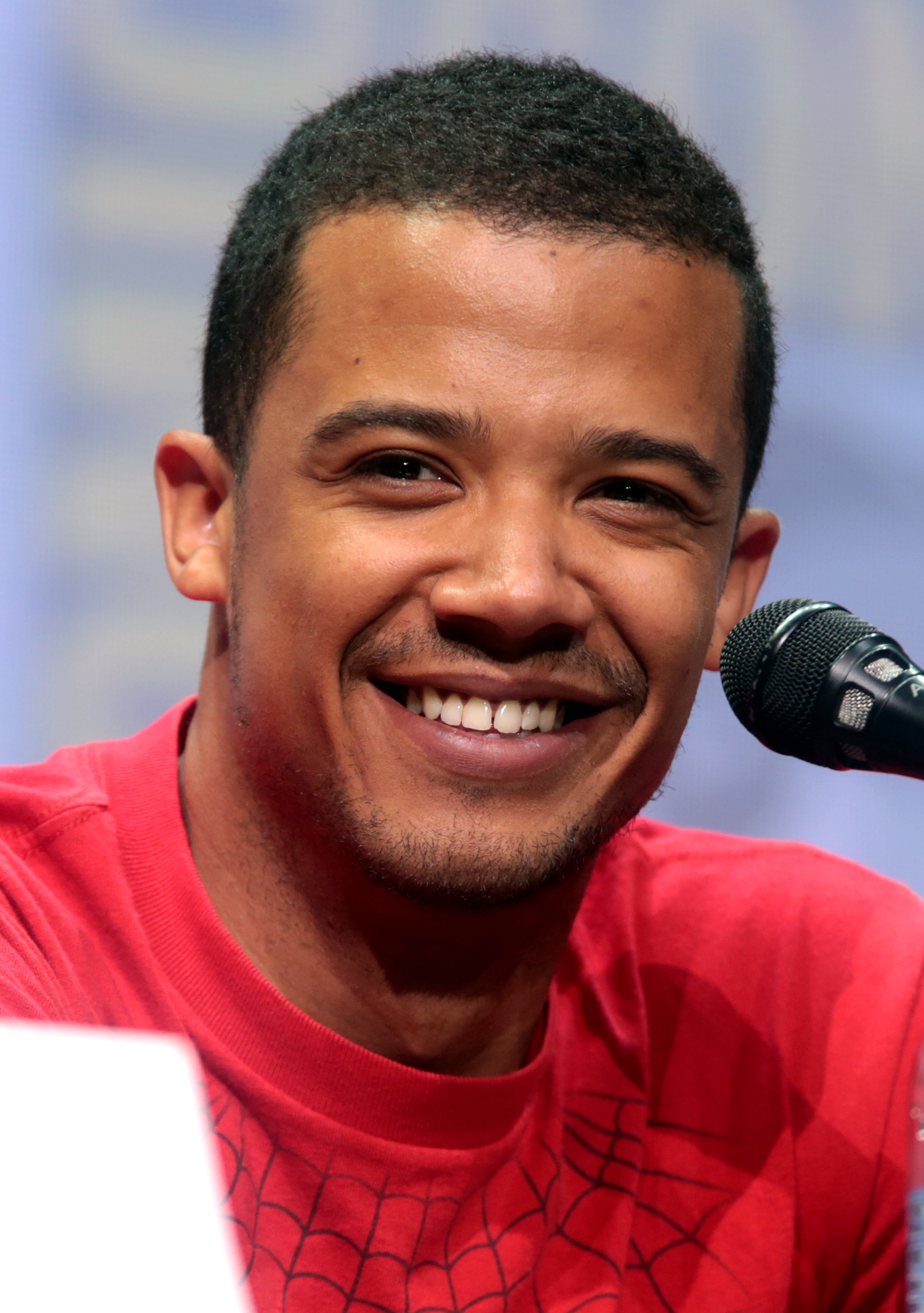
Jacob Anderson

Grey Worm (portrayed by Jacob Anderson) is a captain of the Unsullied, a group of eunuch slave soldiers. His name is pronounced Torgo Nudho in Valyrian and was chosen by his Astapor slave masters, who choose new names for the Unsullied that are designed to humiliate them and make them think they are not human. Despite this, Grey Worm chose to keep his current name because it was his name on the day Daenerys freed the Unsullied, so he considers it to be a lucky name. He is loyal to Daenerys and does not like those who insult her. He develops feelings for Missandei, which appear to be reciprocated, and has a friendly rivalry with Daario Naharis. He is gravely injured in Meereen in an attack by the Sons of the Harpy, but ultimately survives. After Daenerys's disappearance, Grey Worm partially recovers from his injuries and remains in Meereen to help Tyrion Lannister govern the city and maintain peace with the slave masters. When the slave masters go back on the deal and attack Meereen with ships, only to be countered by Daenerys's dragons, Grey Worm kills Razdal mo Eraz and Belicho Paenymion, and later accompanies Daenerys and her retinue on their voyage to Westeros. From her stronghold on Dragonstone, Daenerys sends Grey Worm and his army to take Casterly Rock. The night before Grey Worm admits to Missandei that now he has her to love, he has begun to know what fear is. They make love. Grey Worm expects Casterly Rock to be hard to win and is surprised to find it barely defended: the capture is effected with ease. He then takes his army east and is outside King's Landing when Daenerys and Cersei meet in the Dragonpit.

== Recurring and guest characters ==
=== House Arryn ===
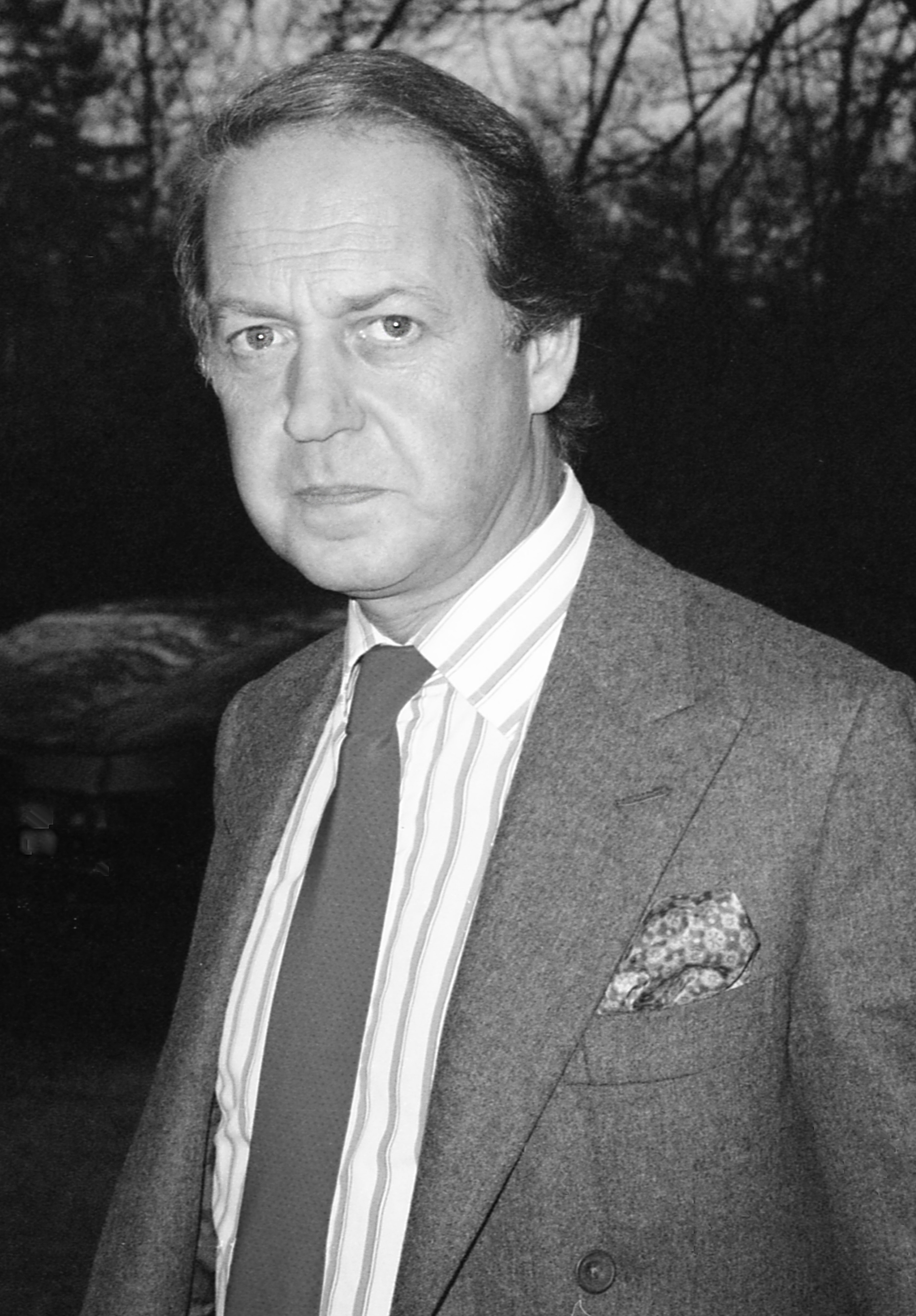
- Sir John Standing
  Jon Arryn (portrayed by John Standing) is the former head of House Arryn, Defender of the Vale, and Warden of the East. He was the husband of Lady Lysa Arryn, and father of Lord Robin Arryn. Jon fostered both Eddard Stark and Robert Baratheon in their youth, and supported Robert during Robert's Rebellion, and served as the first Hand of the King to Robert Baratheon. Jon died of mysterious circumstances. Following his death, Lysa sends a letter to Catelyn Stark, stating that the Lannisters were responsible for his death, eventually leading to Eddard Stark's discovery of the legitimacy of Joffrey, Mycella and Tommen. Whilst the Lannisters were suspected to have poisoned Jon, in reality, he was poisoned by his wife, Lysa, using the Tears of Lys, under the influence of Lord Petyr Baelish.
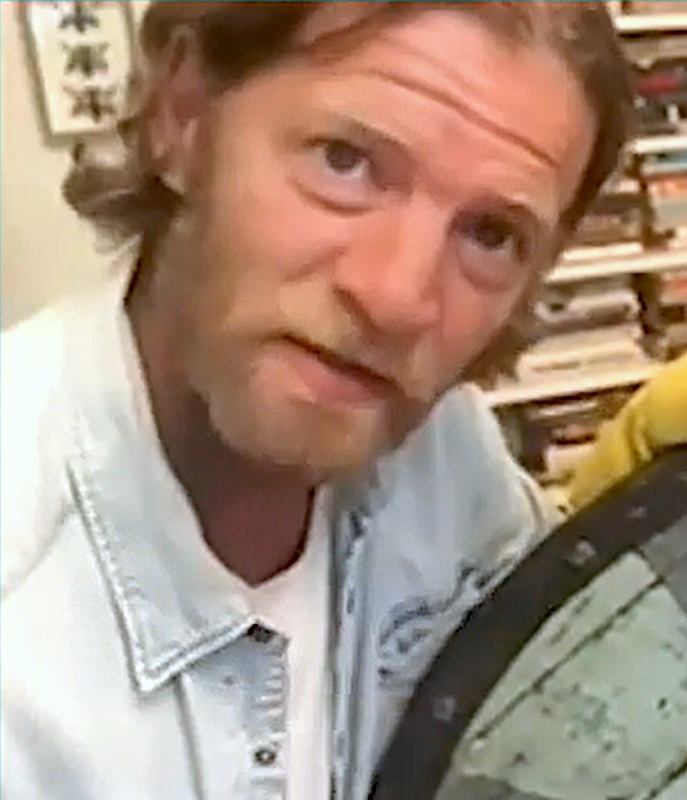
- Jefferson Hall
  Hugh of the Vale (portrayed by Jefferson Hall) is the former squire of Jon Arryn before his death. Following Lord Arryn's death, he is knighted by King Robert Baratheon, and is killed during the Heir's Tourney, by Gregor Clegane. Eddard Stark suspected him of playing a part in Jon Arryn's death. Jefferson Hall also portrays Tyland Lannister and Jason Lannister in House of the Dragon.
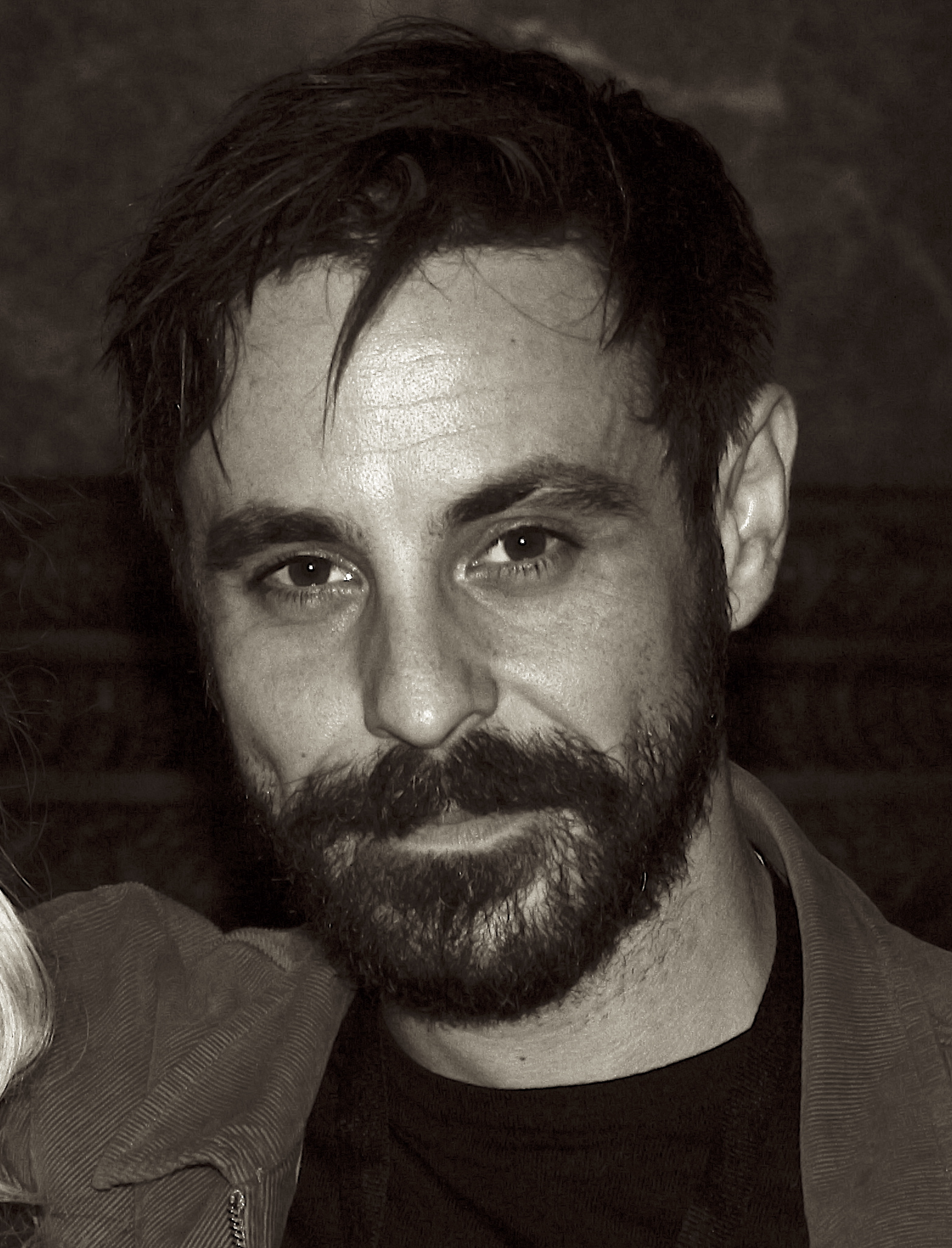
- Emun Elliot
  Marillion (portrayed by Emun Elliott) is a former singer. He accompanies Lady Catelyn Stark, when taking Tyrion Lannister to the Eyrie. After the death of King Robert I Baratheon, Marillion writes and performs a mocking song concerning the circumstances of his death. After being forced to perform, King Joffrey asks whether he would prefer to keep his fingers or his tongue, and when he answers fingers, Ser Ilyn Payne removes Marillion's tongue.
- Lysa Arryn (portrayed by Kate Dickie)
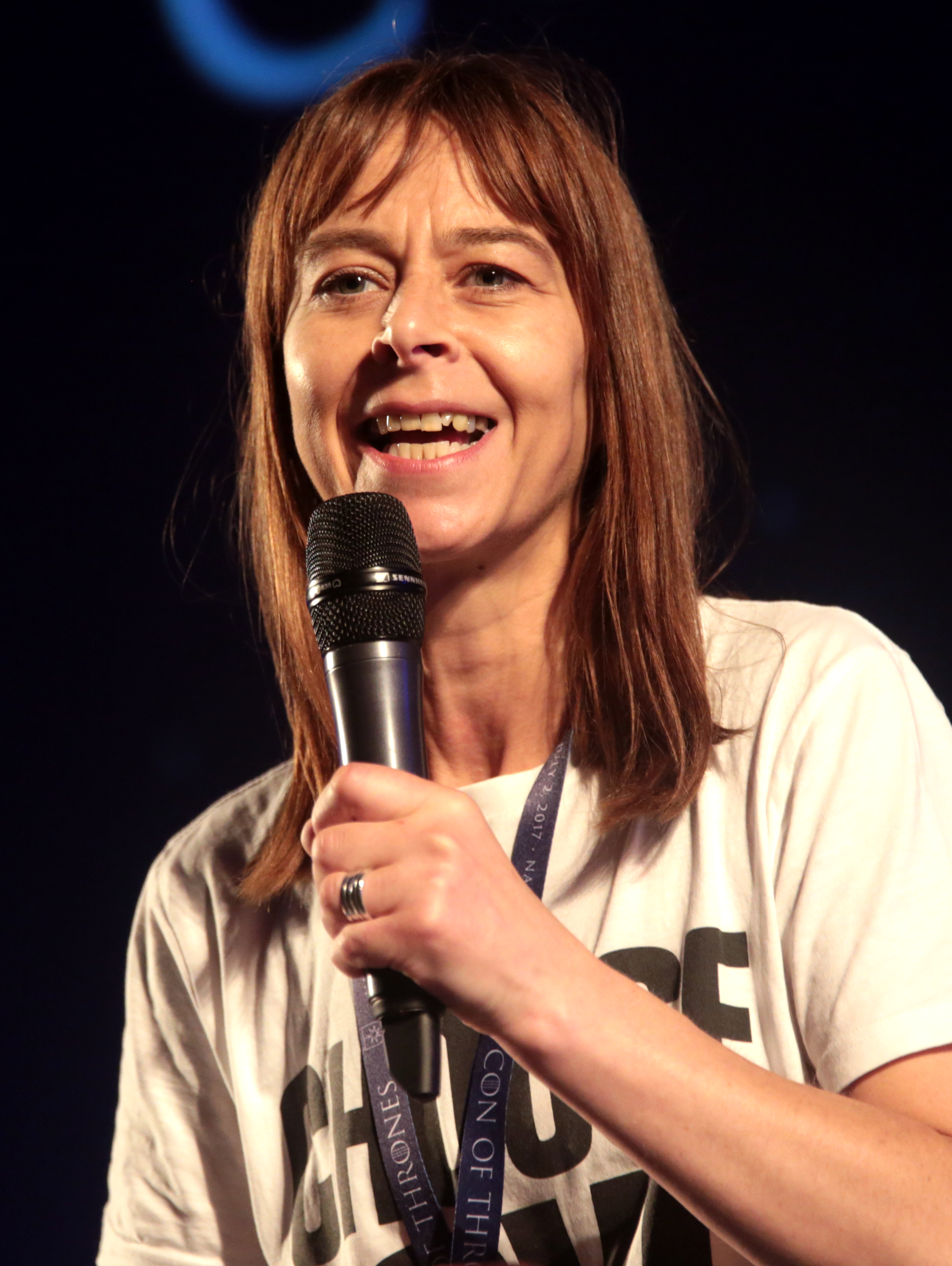
  Kate Dickie
  is the widow of Lord Jon Arryn. Born to the Lord and Lady of the Riverlands, she is the younger sister of Catelyn Stark, Lady of Winterfell, and the older sister of Lord Edmure Tully, Lord of Riverrun. She has grown mentally unstable since the death of her husband, and is convinced that as long as she stays boarded up in the Eyrie she will be safe. She is overly protective of her son, Robin Arryn, which has made him a weak and spoiled child. By season 3, the Vale has remained untouched by the war, and she is betrothed to Littlefinger, who travels to the Vale to marry her. In season 4, it is revealed that Lysa and Littlefinger have been having an affair for quite some time, and are the ones responsible for poisoning Jon Arryn and (though indirectly) Joffrey Baratheon. When Littlefinger returns from King's Landing with Sansa Stark, Lysa greets her niece warmly and insists on marrying Littlefinger that same day. Lysa catches Petyr kissing Sansa and angrily confronts Sansa about it, threatens to push her through the moon door, but Petyr intervenes and pacifies Lysa, before telling her that the one woman he only truly ever loved was Catelyn, and pushes Lysa through the moon door to her death. Her death is ruled a suicide thanks to lies by Petyr and Sansa.
- Robin Arryn (portrayed by Lino Facioli)
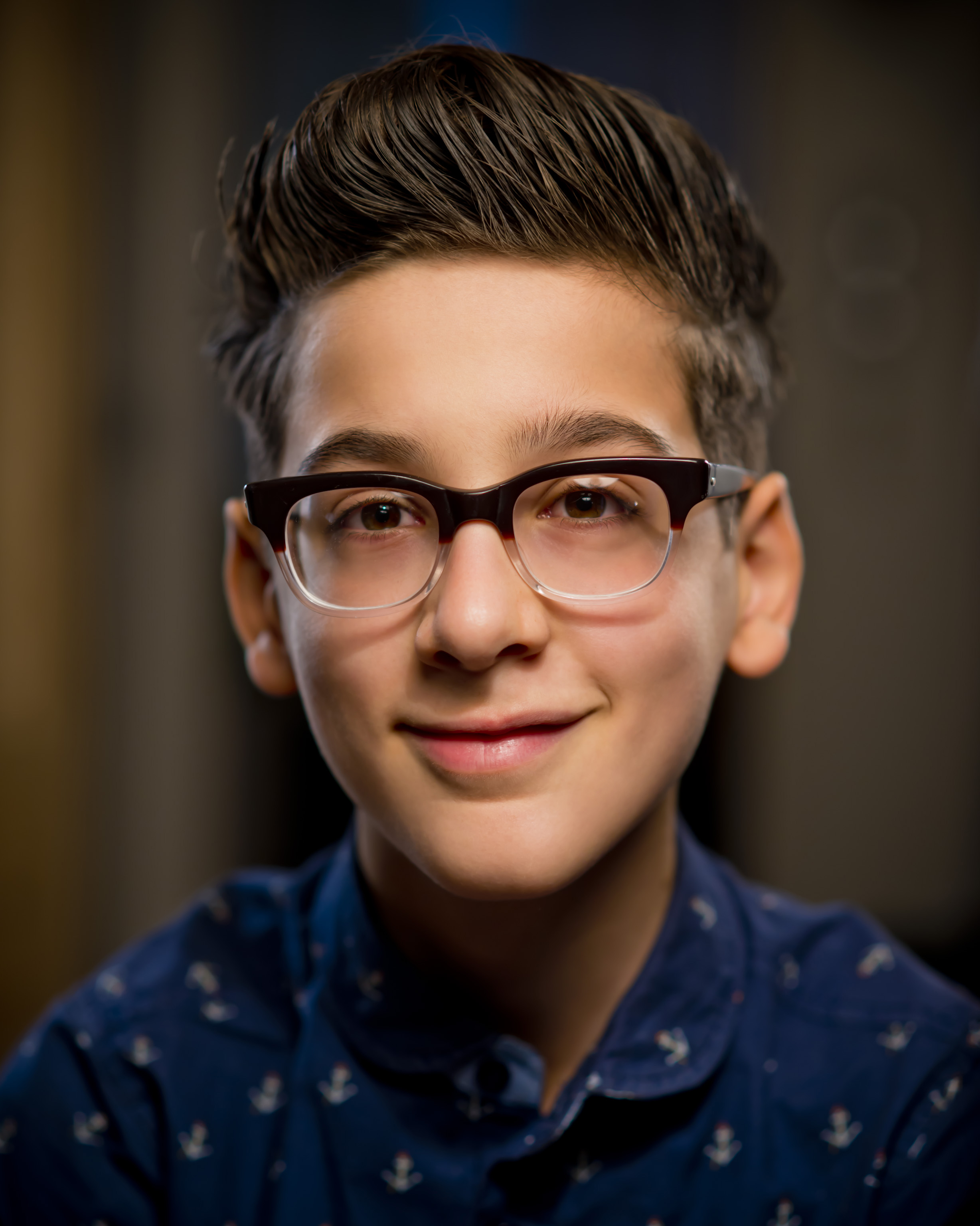
  Lino Facioli
  is the only child of Jon and Lysa Arryn and a sickly boy doted on by his mother, following the death of his father, he is the Head of House Arryn, Defender of the Vale and Warden of the East. He is still breastfed despite being well into pre-adolescence, and is mentally and socially maladjusted. He enjoys seeing people executed by defenestration, whether they are guilty or not. In season 1, he is present at Tyrion Lannister's trial, but shows little to no interest in the details and continuously begs his mother to make the "little Lannister baby-man" fly, which would mean Tyrion being executed, although Tyrion is acquitted. In season 4, he greets Petyr "Littlefinger" Baelish as "Uncle Petyr" and meets his cousin, Sansa Stark, for the first time. After Lysa is killed, Petyr proposes that Robin be taken on several tours of the Vale so as to prepare him for ruling it one day as its new Lord, though Petyr implies that his intention is for Robin to be killed in the process. In season 5, Robin is being trained in the art of fighting, but lacks the skill and determination due to his upbringing. Petyr leaves him in the care of Yohn Royce. In season 6, Robin is informed of Sansa's escape from House Bolton, and through Petyr's manipulations, Robin gives the order for the Knights of the Vale to aid her and Jon Snow against Ramsay Bolton. In season 8, following the death of Daenerys Targaryen, Robin is a member of the Great Council, and advocates for Bran Stark.
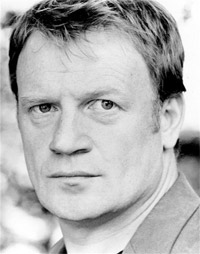
- Mark Lewis Jones
  Shagga (portrayed by Mark Lewis Jones) is the leader of the Stone Crows, one of the hill tribes in the Vale of Arryn. Shagga forms an alliance with Tyrion Lannister, and participates in the Battle of the Green Fork.
- Timmet (portrayed by Tobias Winter) is the warrior leader of the Burned Men, a hill tribe in the Vale, and the son of Timmet. Alongside the Stone Crows and Black Ears, Timmet forges an alliance with Tyrion Lannister, serving him, in exchange for gold and participates in the Battle of the Green Fork during the War of the Five Kings. In season 2, Timmet travels to King's Landing, serving under Tyrion, as acting Hand of the King. Timmet later shortens Grand Maester Pycelle's beard, after Tyrion uncovers that he is in fact a spy.
- Chella (portrayed by Natalia Lee) is the warrior leader of the Black Ears, a hill tribe in the Vale, and the daughter of Cheyk. Alongside the Stone Crows and Burned Men, Chella forges an alliance with Tyrion Lannister, serving him, in exchange for gold and participates in the Battle of the Green Fork during the War of the Five Kings. In season 2, Chella travels to King's Landing, serving under Tyrion, as acting Hand of the King.
- Yohn Royce (portrayed by Rupert Vansittart)
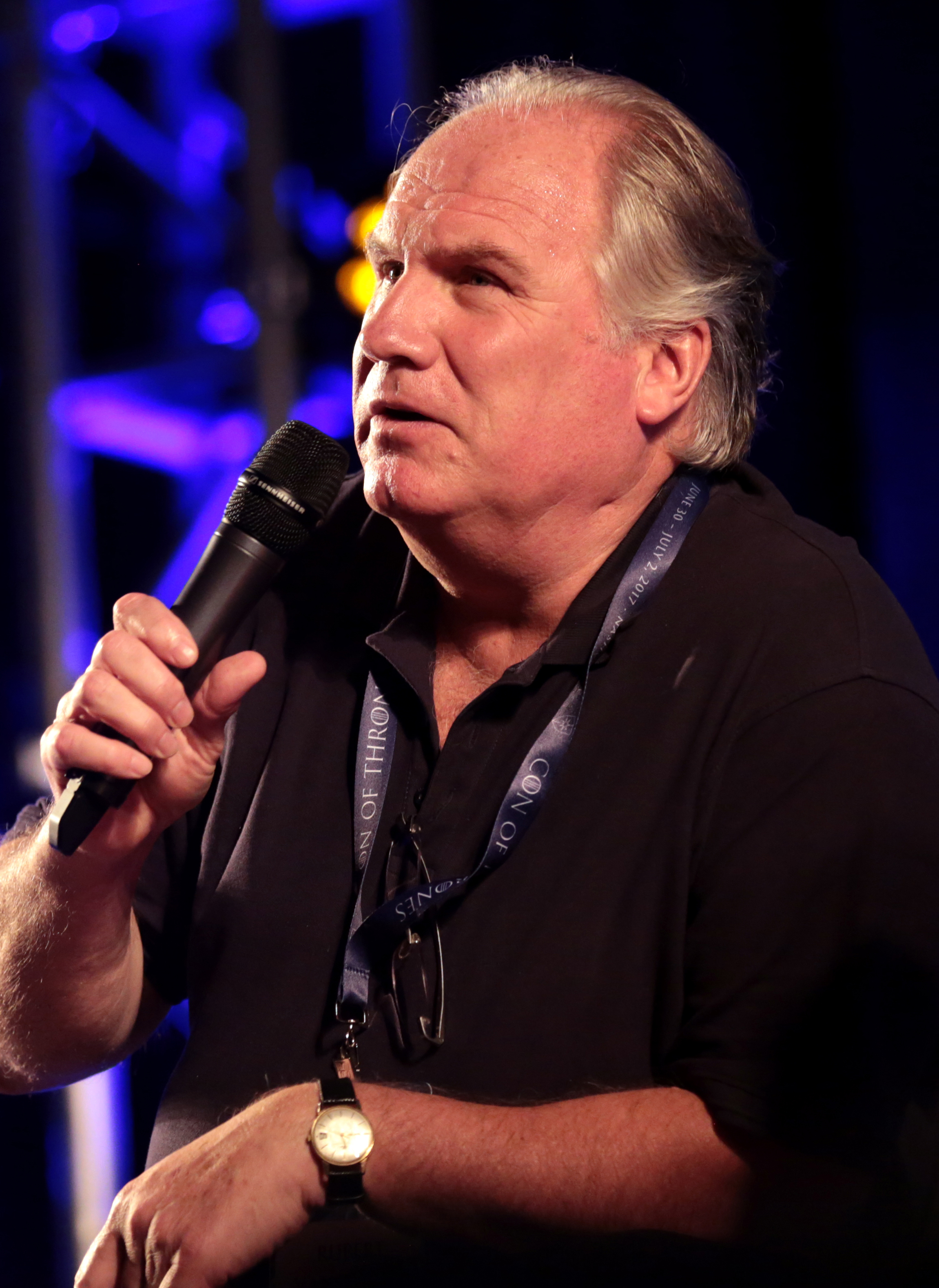
  Rupert Vansittart
  is the head of House Royce of Runestone, a powerful vassal house of House Arryn. Like Lady Waynwood, he suspects Petyr Baelish of having murdered Lysa Arryn, but her death is eventually ruled a suicide. In season 5, he takes Robin Arryn in as his ward. In the sixth season, he is summoned by Baelish to lead the Knights of the Vale to aid Sansa Stark and Jon Snow against the Boltons. In the aftermath, after voicing his disapproval of the wildlings, Yohn joins the Northern Lords in proclaiming Jon the new King in the North. When Baelish is accused by Sansa of Lysa's murder, Yohn supports Sansa's decision to try Baelish. In season 8, following the death of Daenerys Targaryen, Yohn is a member of the Great Council, and advocates for Bran Stark.
- Anya Waynwood (portrayed by Paola Dionisotti) is the Lady of Ironoaks Castle and head of House Waynwood, a powerful vassal house of House Arryn. She suspects Petyr Baelish of murdering Lysa Arryn, but the death is ruled a suicide.
- Donnel Waynwood (portrayed by Alisdair Simpson) is a knight of House Waynwood, and the son of Lady Anya Waynwood. Donnel is a guard at the Bloody Gate, and informs Sandor Clegane and Arya Stark of Lady Lysa Arryn's death.

=== House Baratheon ===
- Myrcella Baratheon (portrayed by Aimee Richardson on season 1 and 2, and by Nell Tiger Free in seasons 5 and 6)
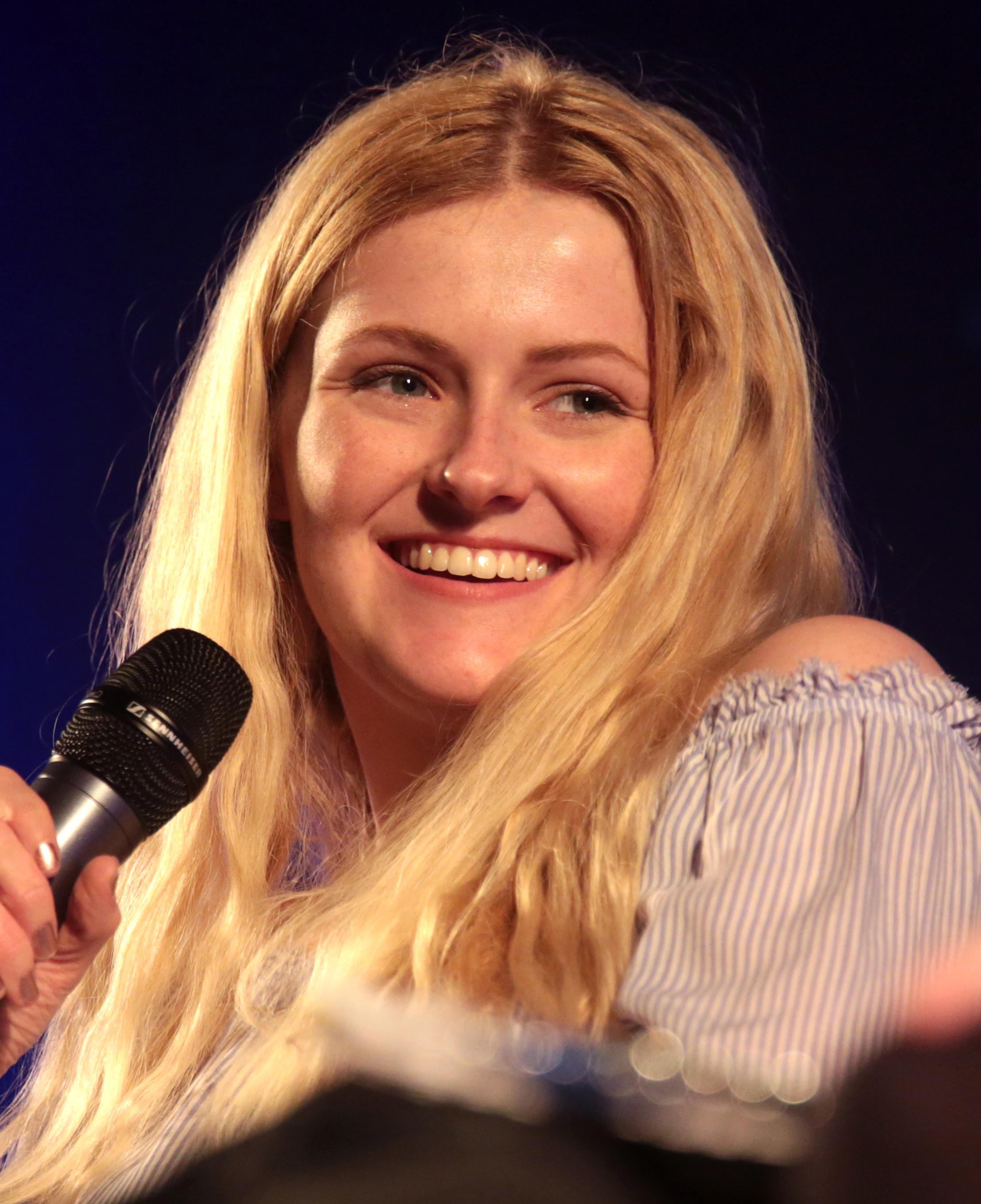
  Aimee Richardson
  is the younger sister of Prince Joffrey and only daughter of Cersei Lannister. She, like her brothers, is also the child of her mother's brother, Jaime, though she remains unaware of this. Unlike her older brother Joffrey, Myrcella is a kind and good person and enjoys being with her uncle Tyrion who in turn dotes on his niece. As part of an alliance between House Lannister and Martell, Myrcella is betrothed to Trystane Martell, son of Prince Doran Martell of Dorne, and sent to Dorne as a ward of House Martell. For over two years, she has been a guest and ward of Prince Doran, betrothed to his son, but her position has become tenuous with the death of Oberyn Martell, the Prince's brother. In season 5, Myrcella is shown at the Water Gardens with her betrothed, with whom she seems to have a good relationship. Unbeknownst to her, she has become a part of Ellaria Sand's plans for revenge although Prince Doran refuses that the young princess be hurt as part of their revenge against the Lannisters. Myrcella is nearly taken by the Sand Snakes but is rescued by the Prince's Guard. She later tells her uncle that she now considers Dorne her home and wants to marry Trystane. A while later, Prince Doran allows her to return to the capital with Jaime on the condition that Trystane accompany them, where he will become a member of the Small Council. On the jetty, about to board the ship, she forgives Ellaria Sand, who unexpectedly gives her a kiss on the mouth. On board the ship, Jaime awkwardly attempts to explain the true nature of his relationship with her mother, to which Myrcella responds that she already knows, having "felt" it for a long time. Jaime embraces his daughter, only to discover in horror that she is bleeding from a poison imbued orally by Ellaria. She collapses and dies in his arms. In season 6, her body is returned to King's Landing and laid to rest in the Great Sept of Baelor. Her funeral is attended only by Jaime and Tommen.
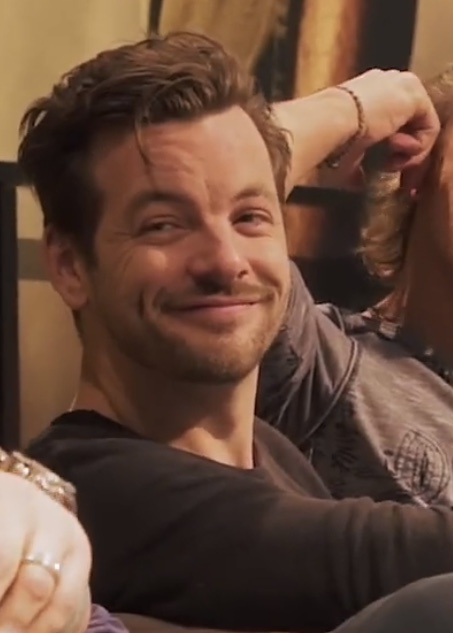
- Gethin Anthony
  Renly Baratheon (portrayed by Gethin Anthony) is the youngest brother of King Robert and Master of Laws in the Small Council. He is popular with the people because he is handsome, jovial, and throws extravagant balls and masquerades. He is not fond of fighting or bloodshed, and would rather make friends than kill enemies. He is secretly the lover of Ser Loras Tyrell, the Knight of the Flowers, who convinces him that those qualities make him better ruling material than either of his older brothers. While Robert lies dying, Renly attempts to convince Ned of this, and that the two of them should kidnap Joffrey and rule the realm themselves. However, Ned refuses, so Renly, Loras, and their followers flee south. Once Joffrey becomes King and has Ned executed, Renly challenges his alleged nephew's claim to the throne. Renly declares himself King of the Seven Kingdoms during Season 2 and wins the support of the Baratheon bannermen and the support of other houses, despite Stannis' better claim. He also seals an alliance with the powerful House Tyrell and its bannermen by marrying Margaery Tyrell. He leads his massive army slowly through southern Westeros, biding his time. Catelyn Stark tries to convince Renly and Stannis to put aside their differences and unite against the Lannisters but it fails as both brothers refuses to give up their claim for the throne. On the night before a battle between his and Stannis' forces, Renly agrees to Catelyn to allow the North and Riverlands be an independent kingdom if they allied with him, but on the condition that Robb Stark swear fealty to him. However, Renly is assassinated by Melisandre, who gives birth to a shadow demon and sends it to kill Renly to remove him from Stannis' path. Stannis is initially unaware of the nature of Melisandre's crime, and is later visibly shocked and saddened of the role he played in his brother's death, which he visibly regrets.
- Maester Cressen (portrayed by Oliver Ford-Davies)
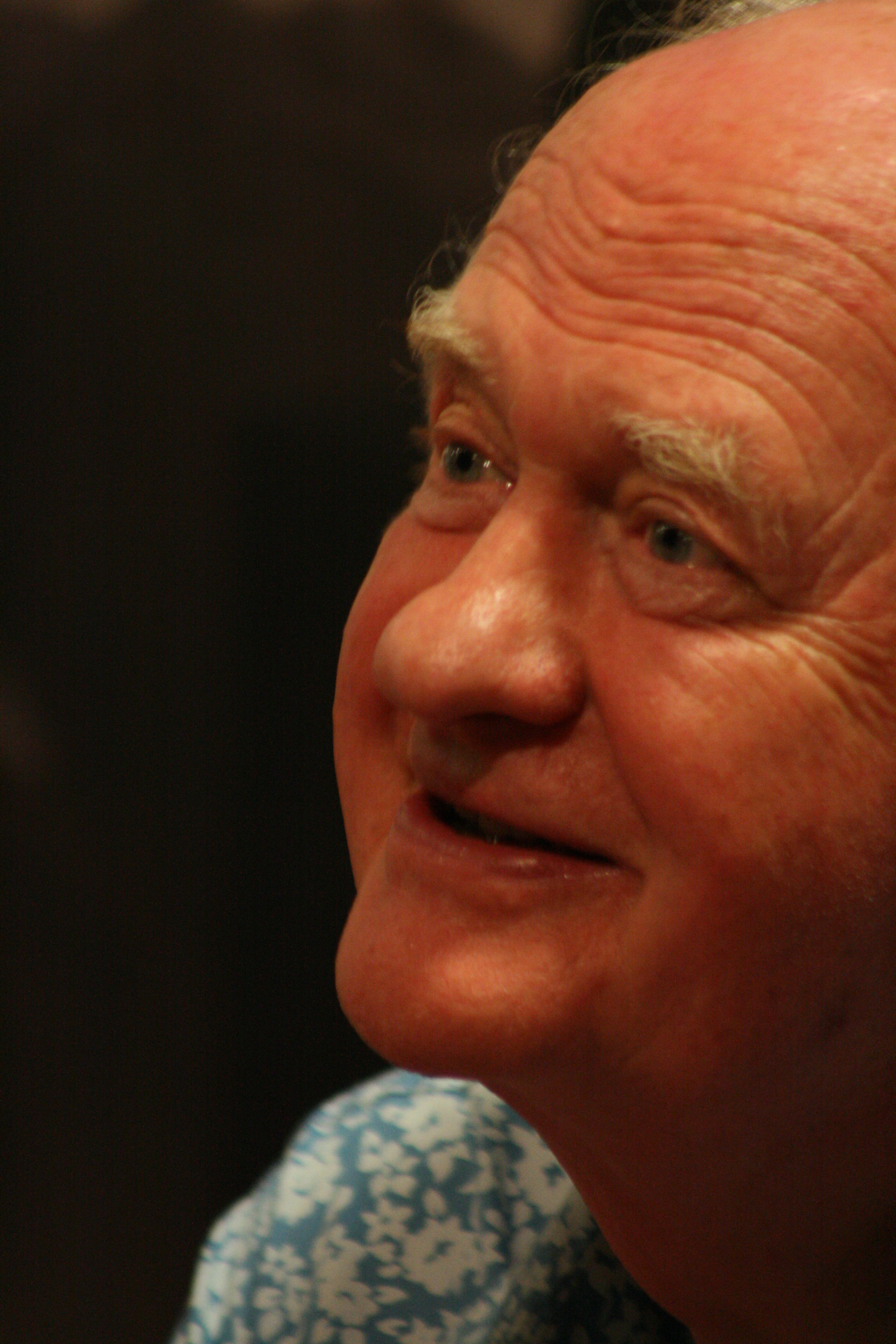
  Oliver Ford Davies
  is the aged Maester of Dragonstone, and skeptical of Melisandre's predictions and the ambitions she has instilled in Lord Stannis to proclaim himself king, claiming "since that boar killed his brother, every lord wants a coronation". He is disgusted when Melisandre sets idols of the Seven gods on fire in the name of her god – R'hollor. He dies in a suicidal attempt to kill Melisandre by offering to share a poisoned cup of wine with her, which does not affect her but kills the aged Cressen almost instantly.
- Matthos Seaworth (portrayed by Kerr Logan) is Davos' son and second-in-command on his ship, Black Betha. Matthos is a devout follower of the Lord of Light and continually tries to convince his father to convert. During the Battle of Blackwater, the Black Betha is caught in a wildfire explosion, killing Matthos.
- Salladhor Saan (portrayed by Lucian Msamati)
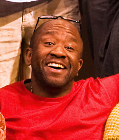
  Lucian Msamati
  is a notorious pirate, trader, and smuggler from Lys. An old friend of Davos, he now sails for Stannis Baratheon on his ship, the Valyrian and his fleet of thirty ships. He has little patience for those that worship R'hollor – Melisandre's God – since he has traveled the world and seen many gods and has come to the conclusion the only true god is between a woman's legs. He agrees to work with Stannis after Davos promises him and his pirates they will be paid in gold and plunder from King's Landing. Salladhor even goes as far as to request the chance to bed Cersei Lannister after the battle, but Davos refuses, unsure if Cersei will be alive at the time. After the Battle of the Blackwater, he finds Davos stranded on a rock and rescues him, but considers his allegiance broken and departs from Stannis' cause after dropping Davos off at Dragonstone, warning him that the Red Woman will pose a threat to him. In season 4, Davos tracks him in Braavos, and offers him gold in exchange for his help in gathering a new army to help them aid the Night's Watch.
- Selyse Florent (portrayed by Tara Fitzgerald)
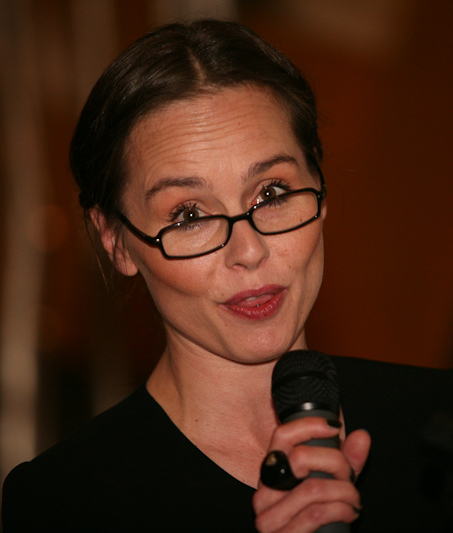
  Tara Fitzgerald
  is the wife of Stannis Baratheon who is kept locked in a tower on Dragonstone. She married Stannis sometime before the events of Robert's Rebellion. She is a member of House Florent of Brightwater Keep in the Reach. Selyse is a fervent worshiper of R'hllor and a supporter of Melisandre. She keeps the preserved corpses of her stillborn sons in jars in her chambers, seemingly even to Stannis's disgust, but expresses resentment over their daughter, Shireen, who suffers from greyscale and who Selyse sees as a demon, though she is only stopped from abusing her by Stannis. She later accompanies her husband to the Wall, and is present at the funeral of the Night's Watch brothers who died in the Battle of Castle Black. She witnesses Mance Rayder's execution and accompanies her husband on the march to Winterfell. After their army becomes trapped in a blizzard, she accepts Melisandre's advice to have Shireen sacrificed as a gift to the Lord of Light, only to recant in the last moments, refusing to stand by as her daughter burns to death. Restrained by Baratheon soldiers, she collapses in screams of agony. The next morning, Selyse hangs herself out of grief.
- Shireen Baratheon (portrayed by Kerry Ingram)
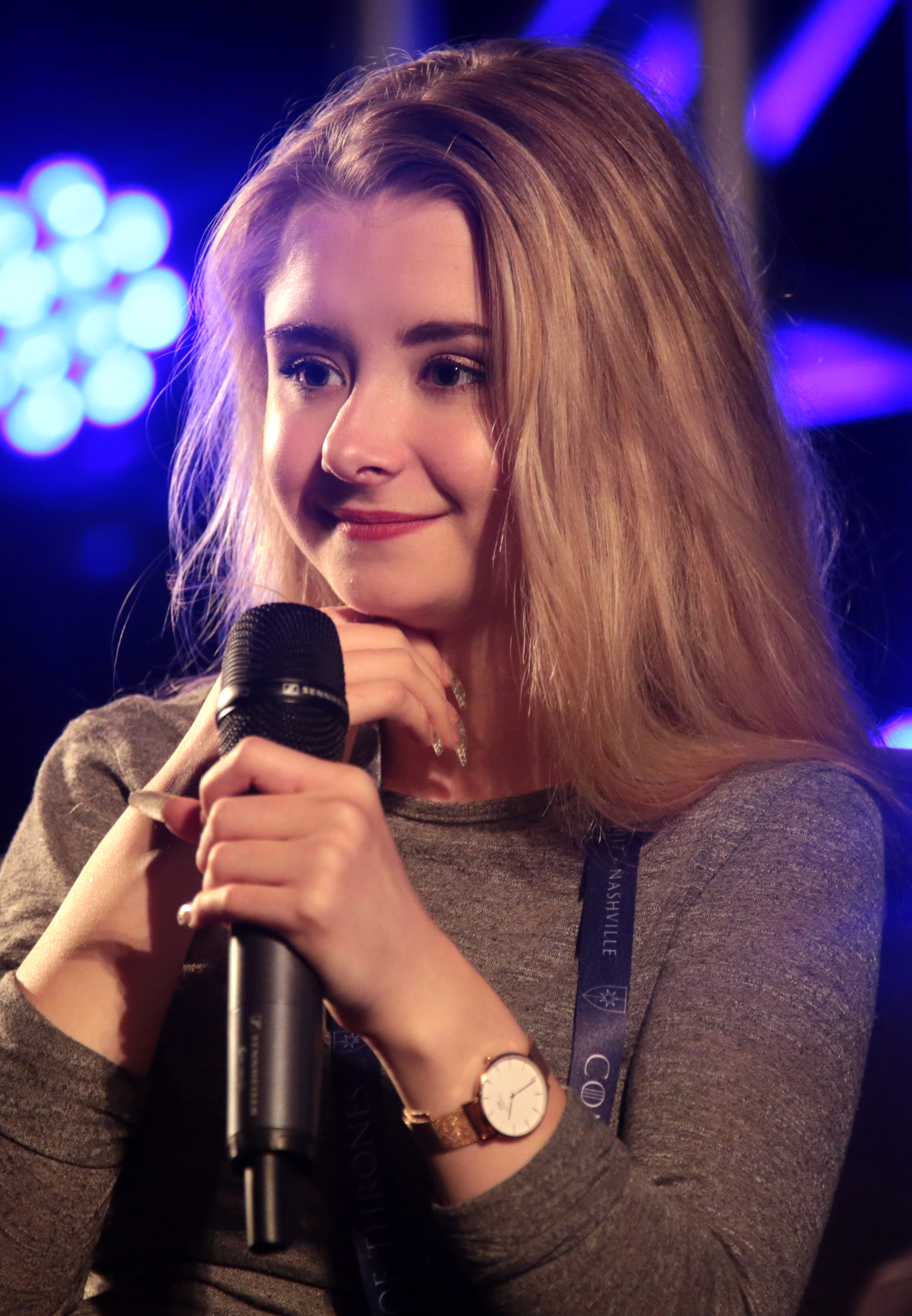
  Kerry Ingram
  is the young daughter of Stannis Baratheon and Selyse Florent. Her face is disfigured by the disease Greyscale, but she is not yet crippled by it. She is a friend of Davos Seaworth and visits him during his captivity at Dragonstone with books, convincing him to teach himself to read, which he does. Though she does not get on well with Melisandre and has a bleak relationship with her mother, she shares a strong bond with her father, who loves her dearly. She later accompanies her father to the Wall, where she witnesses the funeral of the Night's Watch brothers who died in the Battle of Castle Black, as well as the execution of Mance Rayder, and also becomes friends with Gilly and Samwell Tarly. She is sacrificed to the Red God, when Stannis' army is stuck in a snow storm on the way to Winterfell, crying out for her parents who witness her death in tears. This leads to the departure of half of Stannis's army and Stannis losing the battle against the Boltons.

=== House Bolton ===
- Locke (portrayed by Noah Taylor)
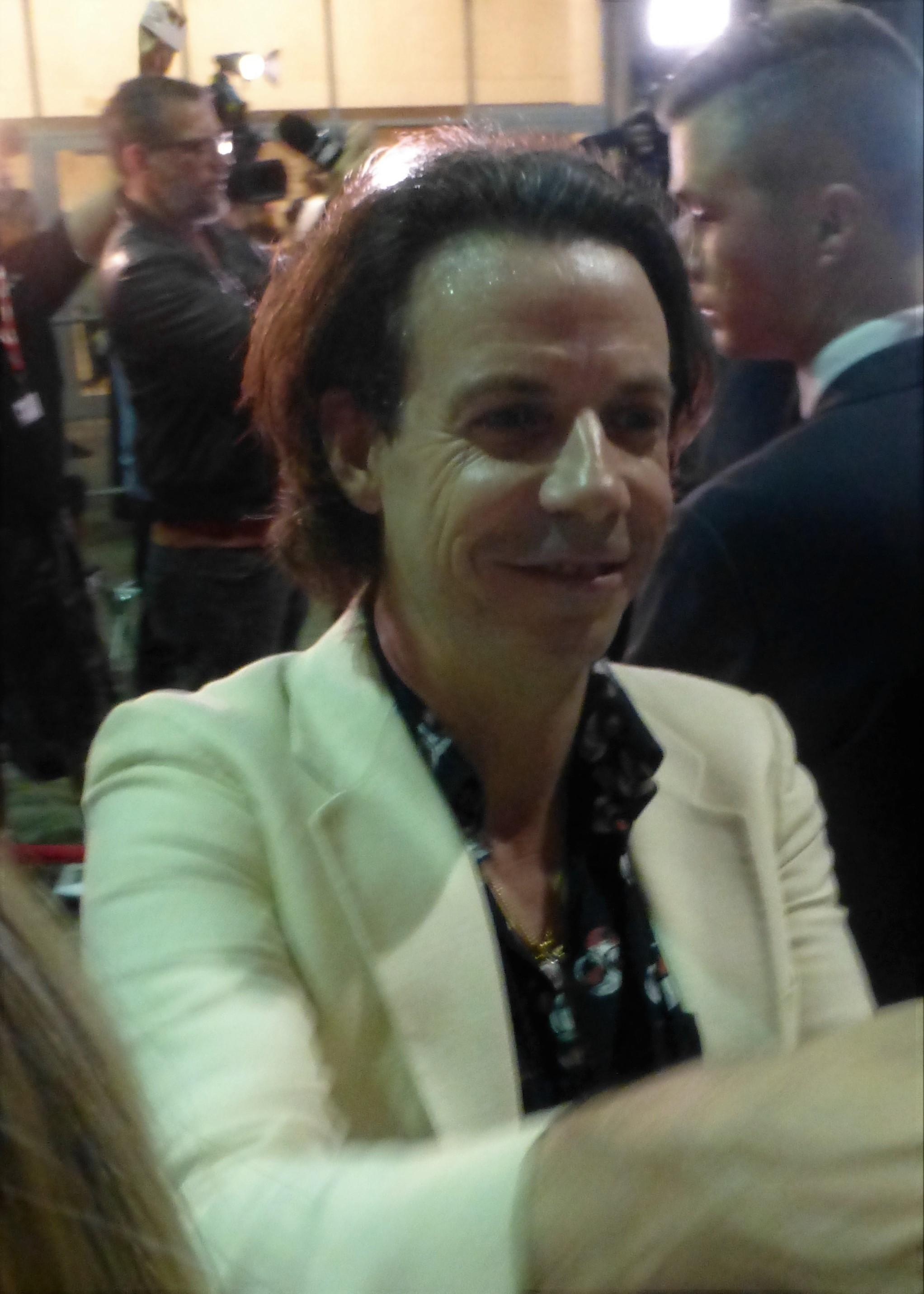
  Noah Taylor
  is a man-at-arms sworn to House Bolton, and acts as Roose Bolton's personal bounty hunter. He captures Brienne of Tarth and Jaime Lannister, who were on their way to King's Landing. Locke later cuts off Jaime's sword hand en route to Harrenhal and tries to feed Brienne to a bear rather than hold her ransom, further demonstrating his contempt for wealth and nobility. He holds Harrenhal in Roose Bolton's name until former Master of Coin Lord Petyr Baelish is proclaimed Lord of Harrenhal and the Riverlands. In season 4, Locke has followed Lord Bolton in pledging loyalty to the Lannisters, and arrives at the Dreadfort with Roose and his men. Locke warmly greets Roose's bastard Ramsay – the two are friends and share mutual interests in flaying and mutilation of their enemies. When Roose learns Bran and Rickon Stark are alive, and may pose a threat to his new title as Warden of the North, he commands Locke to go on a hunt to find the boys, in exchange for a thousand acres of land and a holdfast of his own. Locke eventually arrives at the Wall and becomes acquainted with Jon Snow, Bran and Rickon's half-brother, who he apparently plans to kill as per Ramsay's suggestion. Locke is one of the few who join Jon on his mission to kill the Night's Watch mutineers at Craster's Keep, and in the ensuing battle, he escapes the fray and locates Bran Stark held captive with Jojen Reed, Meera Reed and Hodor. Locke attempts to kidnap Bran and kill him unseen, but Bran uses his warg abilities to enter Hodor's mind, and kills Locke by snapping his neck. His body is brought back to Craster's Keep by Eddison Tollett, and burned along with the rest of the slain.
- Myranda (portrayed by Charlotte Hope)
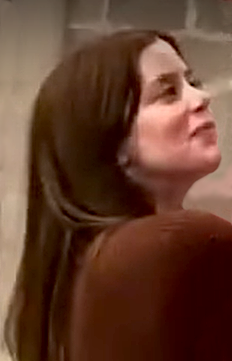
  Charlotte Hope
  is a servant of House Bolton. She is one of Ramsay Snow's bedwarmers and assists in his sadistic schemes. She later accompanies the Boltons to Winterfell, and is present when Sansa Stark arrives with Petyr Baelish, eyeing Sansa with jealousy and anger. Myranda initially comes across as friendly towards Sansa, with her actual intentions hidden. She embraces Sansa upon her first arrival. Myranda also accompanies Ramsay to the aftermath of the surrender of Moat Caitlin. During Sansa's stay at Winterfell, Myranda encounters her again with Theon and torments her with stories of Ramsay's sadism to a horrified Sansa. When Sansa is trying to escape Winterfell, she is caught by Myranda accompanied by Theon. Myranda taunts her further with threats of Ramsay's plans to mutilate her once he has a child. After Sansa refuses to be bullied, Myranda points an arrow at her, preparing to injure her while leaving her usable for Ramsay to father a child. However, this tips Theon into finally rebelling against the Boltons and he saves Sansa by disarming Myranda and pushing her off the castle wall to her death. Her body is found shortly afterwards by Ramsay, who pays his respects to her before ironically having her fed to the hounds.
- Walton Steelshanks (portrayed by Jamie Michie) is a man-at-arms, in service to House Bolton. He transports Jamie Lannister to Harrenhal, under the orders of Lord Roose Bolton, although he is threatened by Jamie, into returning him to Harrenhal in order to save Brienne of Tarth.
- Tansy (portrayed by Jazzy de Lisser) was a servant of House Bolton, and a bedwarmer of Ramsey Snow. Due to Myranda, a fellow bedwarmer's jealousy of her, Tansy is hunted by Ramsey, Myranda, and his hounds, in the wood near the Dreadfort, as part of Ramsey's game, stating if she escaped, she would win, and be allowed to live. Myranda eventually shoots her with an arrow in the leg, and Ramsey goads his dogs into ripping her to shreds.
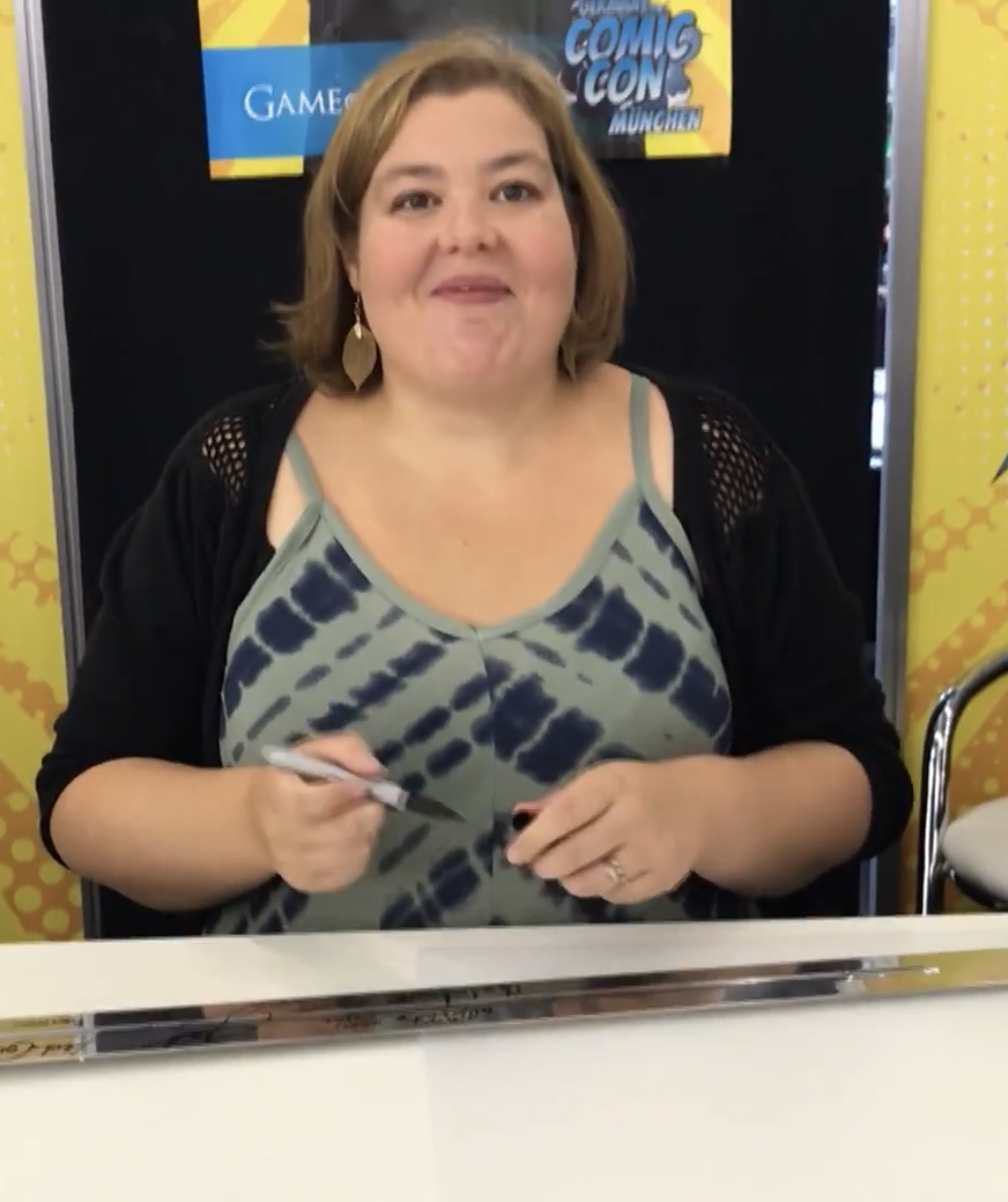
- Elizabeth Webster
  Walda Bolton (portrayed by Elizabeth Webster) is a granddaughter of Lord Walder Frey. She is the new wife of Roose Bolton, the Lord of the Dreadfort. During the wedding feast of Edmure Tully and Roslin Frey, Lord Bolton recounts to Catelyn Stark and Ser Brynden "Blackfish" Tully how Lord Walder Frey proposed him to marry one of his granddaughters and offered her weight in silver as dowry. Lord Bolton then adds he chose the fattest bride available and she has made him very rich. In season 4, she arrives at the Dreadfort with her new husband and his men (having been smuggled back into the North to avoid the Ironborn) and is greeted warmly by Ramsay Snow as "mother". She accompanies the Boltons to Winterfell, and receives Sansa Stark and Petyr Baelish along with her husband and stepson. In season 5 it is revealed that she is pregnant, which makes Ramsay feel threatened for his position as Roose's heir. In season 6, after she gives birth to a boy, she and her baby are mauled to death by Ramsay's hounds, shortly after Ramsay kills his father.
- Harald Karstark (portrayed by Paul Rattray) is the lord of Karhold and the son of Rickard Karstark, who was executed by Robb Stark. He declares for House Bolton to counter any Stark force that Sansa may muster after escaping Winterfell, and witnesses Ramsay kill Roose. In the subsequent battle between the Bolton forces and Jon Snow's army, Harald leads the Karstark men into battle, but he disappears in the ensuing conflict. Although his death is not shown, Jon Snow confirms it in the season 7 premiere.
- Jon Umber (portrayed by Dean Jagger) is the son of Greatjon Umber, one of House Stark's most powerful bannermen. "Smalljon" became Lord of Last Hearth, the northernmost of the castles in the North, after his father's death. Smalljon, however, chooses to side with the Boltons by handing his father's wards, Rickon Stark and Osha, to Ramsay Snow as an alliance gift, to gain Ramsay's help in countering Jon Snow and his wildling army. In the subsequent battle between Ramsay's forces and Jon Snow's army, he leads the Umber forces into battle and fights Tormund Giantsbane. Though it seems as if he will win, Smalljon is momentarily distracted by the arrival of the Knights of the Vale, long enough for Tormund to bite his throat out and stab him to death.

=== House Frey ===
- Walder Frey (portrayed by David Bradley)
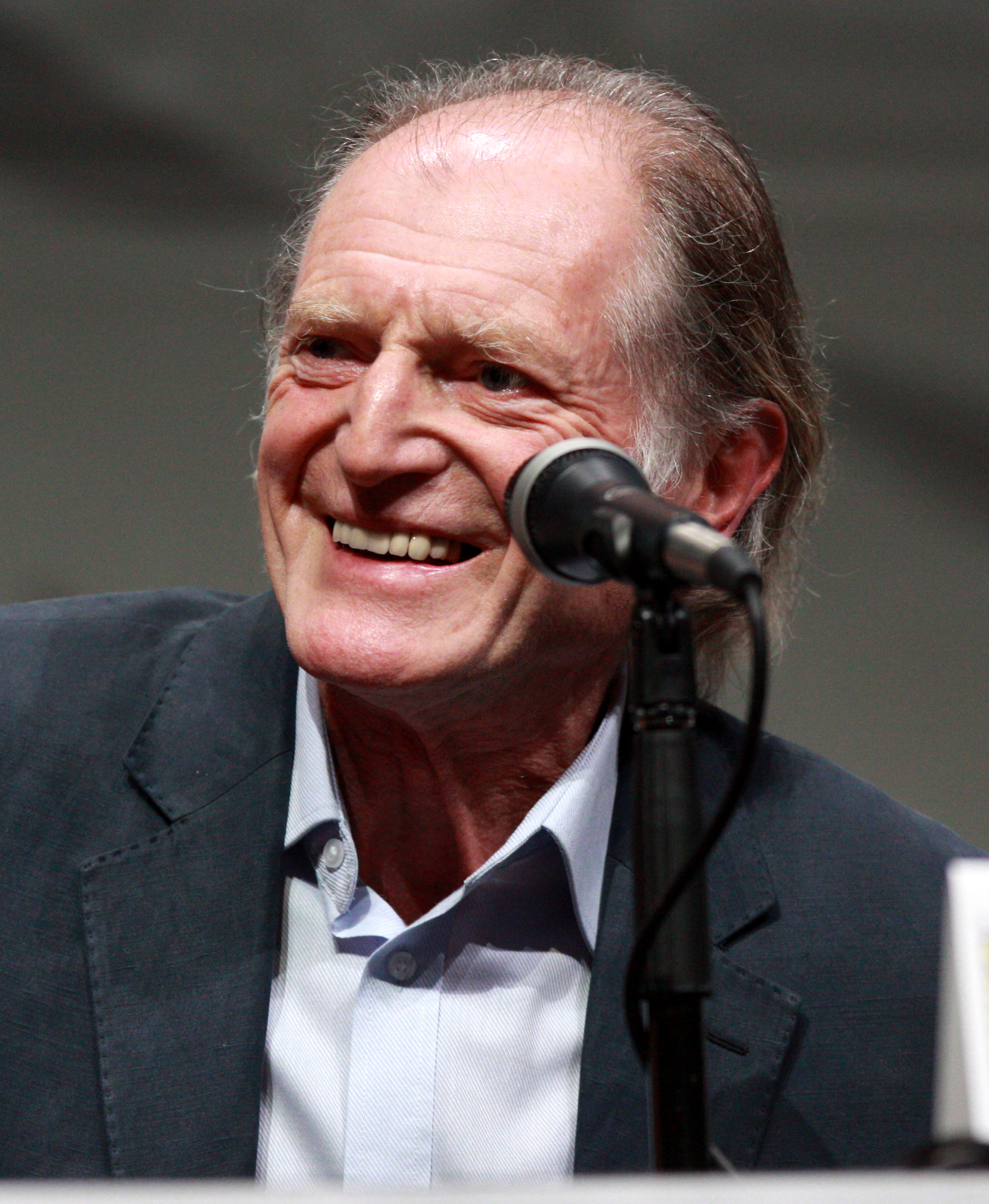
  David Bradley
  is the head of House Frey, Lord of the Crossing and bannerman to House Tully. He is known for outliving his many wives (now on his 8th) and siring over 100 children (both bastard and trueborn). Because the use of the Twins became a strategic necessity for Robb's host, Walder was able to negotiate marriage contracts for his children to Robb and Arya Stark. But during Season 2 Robb broke his word and married Lady Talisa. For this slight, and willing to take advantage of the war's changing fortunes, he conspires with Tywin Lannister and Roose Bolton to betray Robb Stark at the wedding of his liege Edmure Tully, which he insists in return for support of his men. Frey hosts the infamous "Red Wedding" at which Robb Stark, his wife and mother are all murdered, refusing to spare Robb even as Catelyn holds Lady Frey hostage and threatens to slit her throat, which she does. He is subsequently granted Riverrun and its lands and expresses delight to take another young wife, but his house is irredeemably tarnished by the betrayal and House Tully's vassals refuse to submit to his rule. In season 6, he is outraged when he hears of the Blackfish recapture' of Riverrun and blames his sons Lothar and Black Walder for allowing him to escape. He then orders them to retake the castle using Edmure Tully as a hostage. Though they successfully retake Riverrun with the help of a Lannister host led by Jaime Lannister, Walder is ambushed shortly afterwards by Arya Stark, who slits his throat in revenge for the Red Wedding. In season 7, Arya uses Walder's face to deceive and poison the rest of his family.
- Stevron Frey (portrayed by Colin Carnegie) is the firstborn son of Lord Walder Frey, and Heir to the Twins. When Lady Catelyn Stark attempts to bargain with his father, Stevron attempts to reprimand his father for his manors but is quickly dismissed.
- Joyeuse Frey (portrayed by Kelly Long) is the eighth wife of Lord Walder Frey, and a former member of House Erenford. During the Red Wedding, her throat is slit by Lady Catelyn Stark, when she attempts to a get Walder to spare Robb Stark, in exchange for Joyeuse's life, but Walder retorts that he will find another one. After Robb is killed, Catelyn slits her throat.
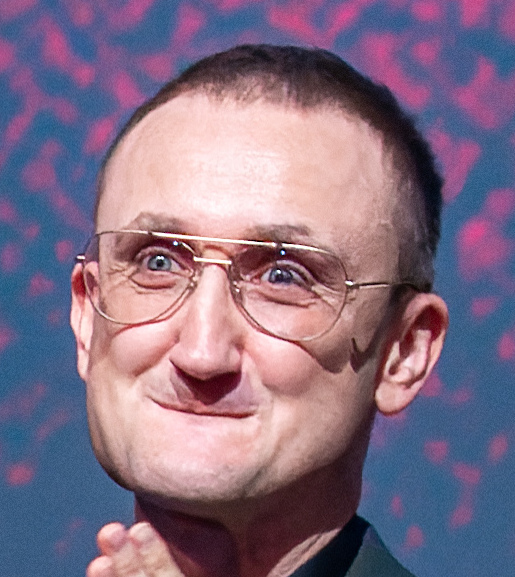
- Tom Brooke
  Lothar Frey (portrayed by Tom Brooke in season 3, and by Daniel Tuite in season 6) is one of Lord Walder Frey's many sons, nicknamed “Lame Lothar” because of his twisted leg. He and his half-brother Black Walder are sent by their father to Riverrun to propose a marriage between Lord Edmure Tully and Roslin Frey as terms for House Frey rejoining Robb Stark's campaign against the Lannisters. He is one of the first to commence the "Red Wedding", stabbing Talisa Stark in the womb several times and killing her and her unborn child. In the sixth season, he is ordered by Walder to retake Riverrun, which he manages to do with Lannister help. Eventually, he is killed by Arya Stark, who bakes him into a pie.
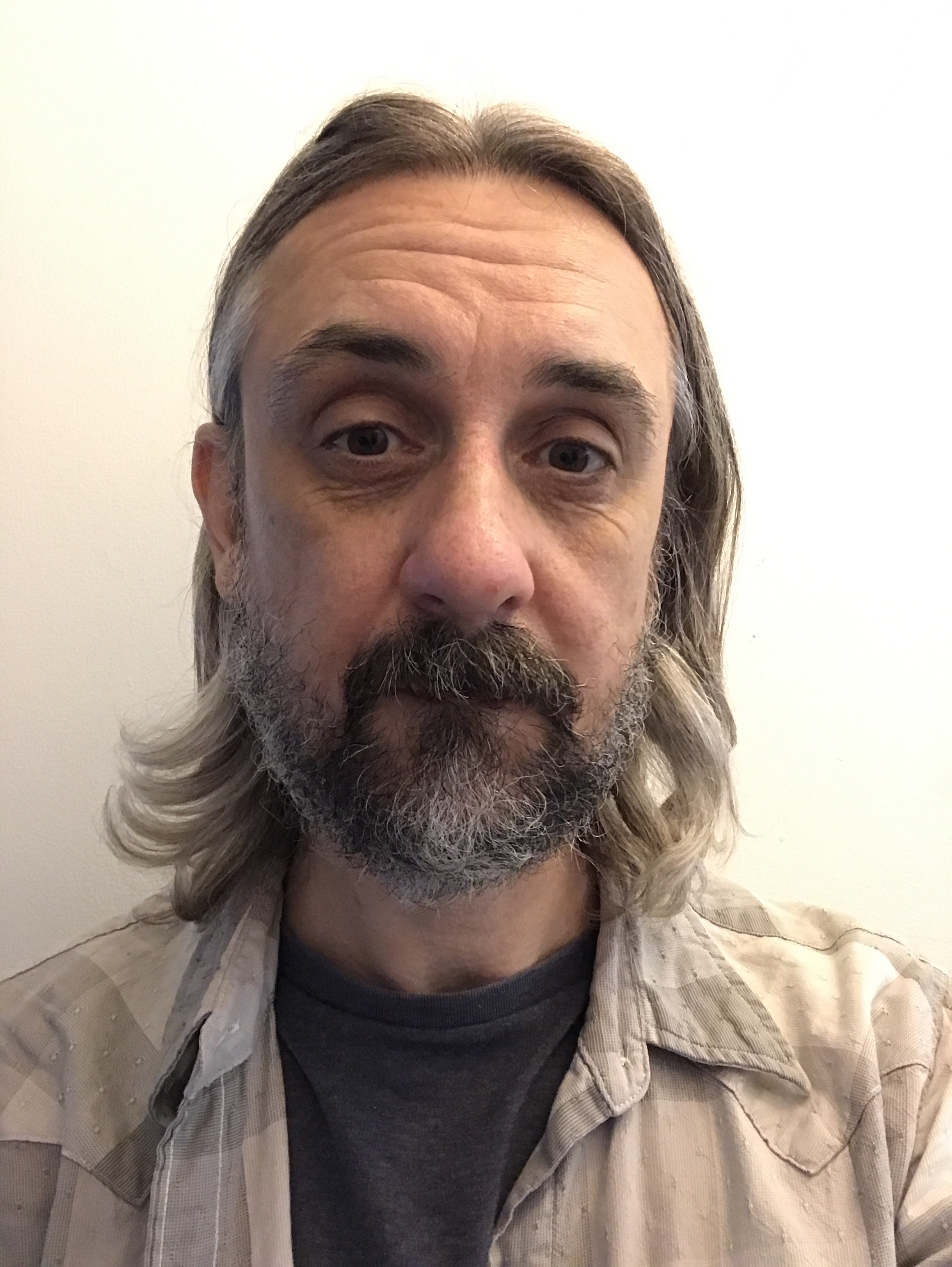
- Tim Plester
  Black Walder Rivers (portrayed by Tim Plester) is one of Lord Walder Frey's many bastard sons, nicknamed “Black Walder” for his dark demeanor. He and his half-brother Lame Lothar are sent by their father to Riverrun to propose a marriage between Lord Edmure Tully and Roslin Frey as terms for House Frey rejoining Robb Stark's campaign against the Lannisters. He kills Catelyn Stark at the Red Wedding, after she slits Lady Frey's throat in retaliation for her son's death. In the sixth season, he takes part in the siege of Riverrun, which they reclaim with the help of a Lannister host. Eventually, Black Walder is killed along with Lothar by Arya Stark, who bakes them both into a pie.
- Roslin Frey (portrayed by Alexandra Dowling) is Lord Walder Frey's daughter and considered the most beautiful one. She was previously the intended bride for Robb Stark, who was unaware of her beauty and went on to marry Talisa Maegyr instead. She is married to Lord Edmure Tully as compensation at what becomes known as the Red Wedding. In the sixth season, it is mentioned that Roslin has given birth to Edmure's child.
- Kitty Frey (portrayed by Lucy Hayes) is the ninth wife of Lord Walder Frey. She is present during Arya Stark's mass poisoning of House Frey.

=== House Greyjoy ===
- Yara Greyjoy (portrayed by Gemma Whelan)
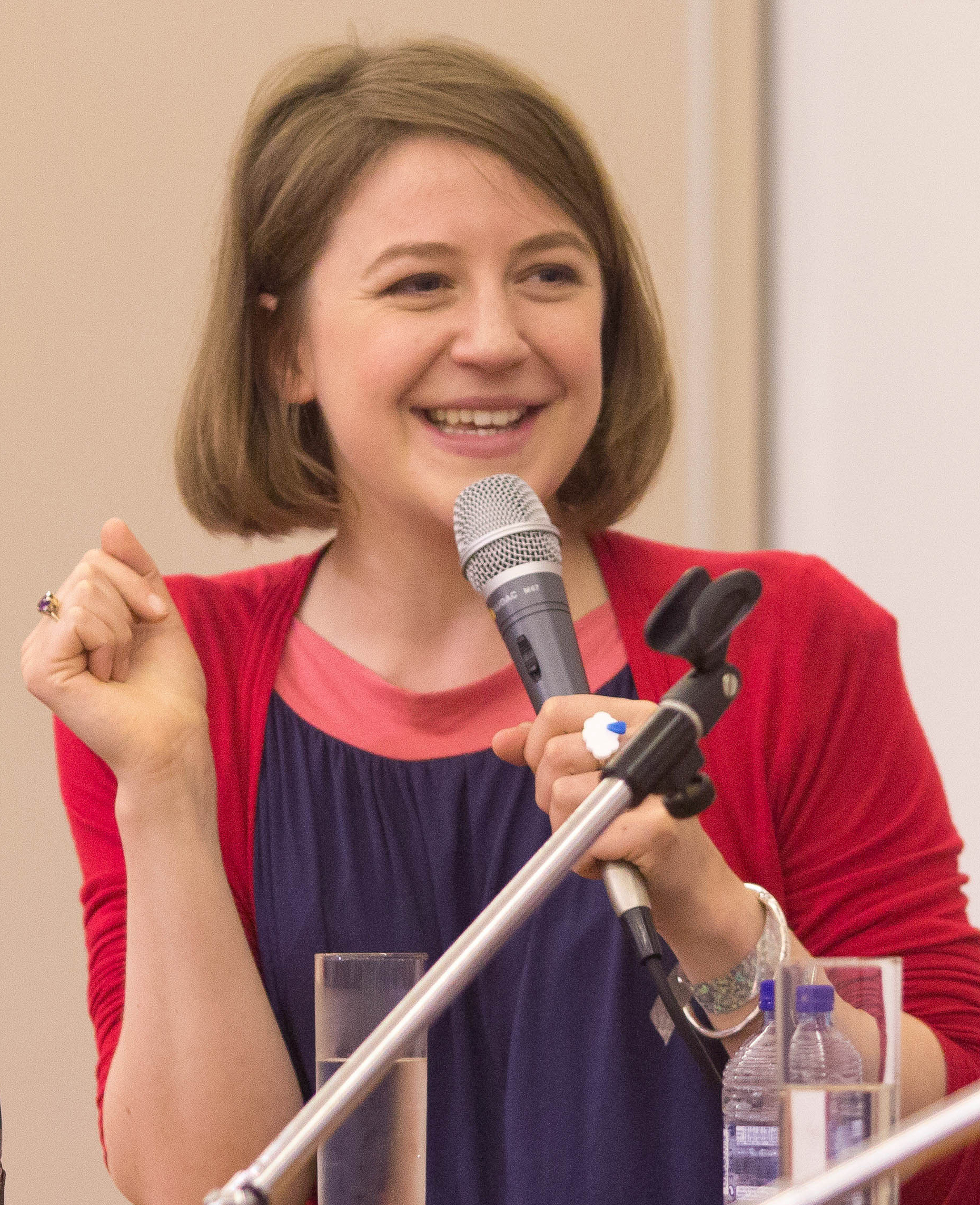
  Gemma Whelan
  is the daughter of Balon Greyjoy and his wife Alannys Harlaw, and elder sister of Theon. She is fierce and proud, and defies traditional ironborn gender roles by commanding her own ship, the Black Wind. She has earned her father's respect by commanding men, and killing men. When her brother Theon takes Winterfell, Yara tries to convince him to go back with her to the Iron Islands, but Theon refuses. Theon is betrayed by his own men and given to Ramsay Snow, Lord Bolton's sadistic bastard son, who brutally tortures and eventually castrates him. Ramsay sends Theon's penis in a box to Balon, with Ramsay threatening to mutilate Theon more unless the Ironmen leave the North, whom Ramsay also threatens to flay alive. Balon refuses this, but Yara intends to save her brother of her own accord, taking one ship and fifty of the best killers on the Iron islands with her. In season 4, Yara and her men attack the Dreadfort, but find that Ramsay has broken Theon so badly that he refuses to leave with her and even insists that his name is Reek. Ramsay and his men confront Yara in the dungeon and a battle ensues in which Ramsay frees the hounds and sets them on Yara, who is forced to flee the Dreadfort without Theon, telling her men that Theon is dead. In season 6, Yara contests the Kingsmoot to decide Balon's successor and appears to sway the Ironborn by declaring that she will build the world's largest fleet, but is defeated by Euron, who plans to forge an alliance with Daenerys Targaryen to conquer Westeros. Correctly suspecting that Euron will have them killed, Yara and Theon flee the Iron Islands with their loyalists and the bulk of the Iron Fleet, and head to Meereen to forge an alliance with Daenerys first. After explaining the situation, Yara pledges her forces to Daenerys in return for the Iron Islands' independence. Yara is ordered to sail to attack King's Landing. While below decks enjoying the company of Ellaria Sand, her fleet is set upon by ships under Euron's command and they are captured. Shortly before the Battle of Winterfell, Theon leads a raiding party and frees his sister. Yara sails to the Iron Isles, to retake them in the name of Daenerys, in case the Queen and her people need a fallback position after the battle. Following the death of Daenerys Targaryen, Yara is a member of the Great Council, and advocates for Bran Stark.
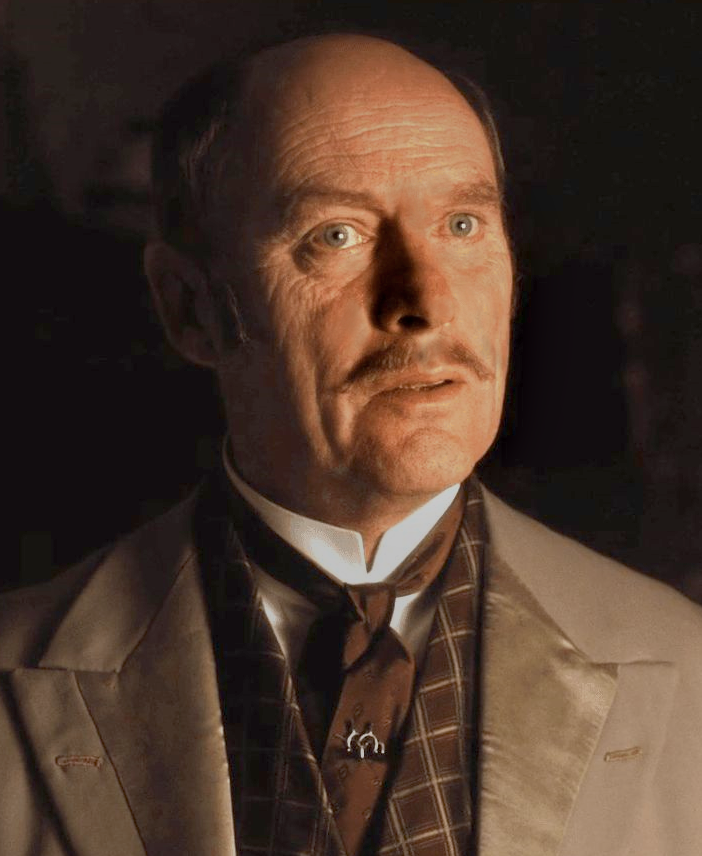
- Patrick Malahide
  Balon Greyjoy (portrayed by Patrick Malahide) is the Lord of the Iron Islands and father of Theon and Yara. Balon wished to continue the conquering ways of his people, which led him to rebel against the Iron Throne 9 years prior to the start of the series. He lost, with two of his three sons killed in the war; his youngest, Theon, was taken as a ward at Winterfell as a way to keep him from attempting another rebellion. After Theon returns to the Iron Islands with an offer from King Robb Stark for an alliance against the Lannisters, Balon refuses and instead launches beach raids against the North, proclaiming himself King of the Iron islands and the North. Theon, however, is captured and brutally tortured by the sadistic Ramsay Snow, lord Bolton's bastard, who eventually castrates him. Ramsay sends Theon's penis in a box to Balon, with Ramsay threatening to mutilate Theon further unless the Ironmen retreat from the North, whom Ramsay also threatens to flay living. Balon refuses, stating that as Theon defied him by attacking Winterfell, claiming him a "fool" and "not a man anymore", to which Yara responds she intends to save her little brother of her own accord. In season 6, he is confronted by his younger brother, Euron, who declares that Balon has ruled for too long and throws him from a rope bridge to his death.
- Aeron Greyjoy (portrayed by Michael Feast)
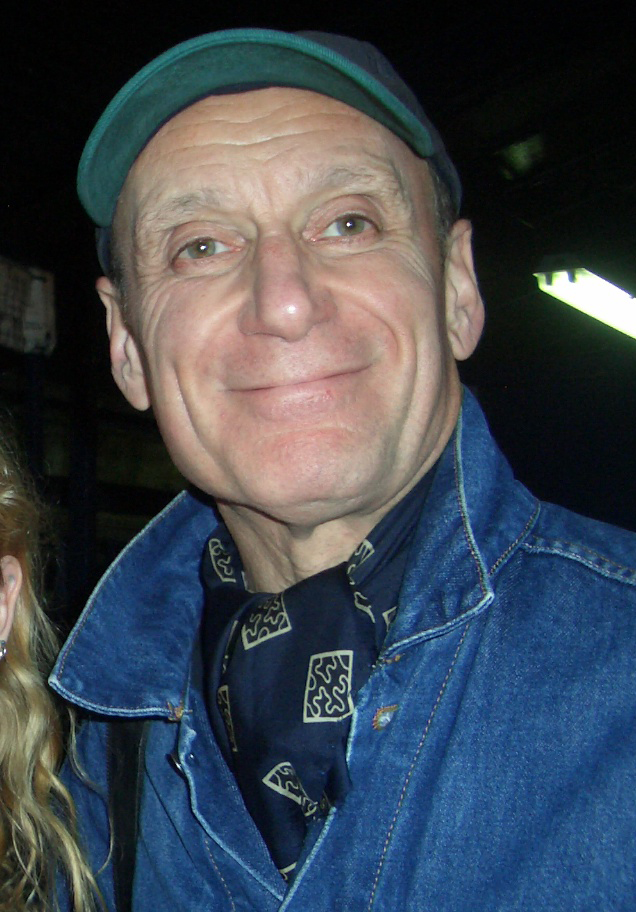
  Michael Feast
  is a brother of King Balon Greyjoy, and an uncle of Theon and Yara Greyjoy. Aeron is a Drowned Priest in service to the Drowned God. When Theon returned to the Iron Islands, Aeron reinitiated him into the faith of the Drowned God. After Balon's death, Aeron held a Kingsmoot to determine Balon's successor. Euron Greyjoy wins the election and is baptized by Aeron.
- Dagmer Cleftjaw (portrayed by Ralph Ineson)
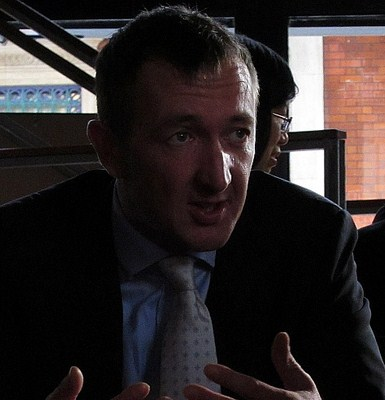
  Ralph Ineson
  is an Ironborn Raider and Theon Greyjoy's first mate on the Sea Bitch. He suggests that Theon prove himself by taking Winterfell, and persuades him to commit further atrocities to shore up his rule, such as executing Ser Rodrik Cassel for defying Theon and killing two children to pass off as Bran and Rickon Stark. However, when Robb Stark sends Ramsay Snow with an offer to spare the Ironborn if they surrender Winterfell and Theon, he knocks Theon out to hand him over and fatally wounds Maester Luwin. It is revealed in the season three finale that Dagmer and the other ironborn were instead flayed alive by Ramsay Snow and his men.
- Black Lorren (portrayed by Forbes KB) is an infamous Ironborn raider better known as "Black Lorren". He is considered among the fiercest Ironborn warriors. He is under Theon's command while taking Winterfell. He is ultimately flayed alive by Ramsay Snow, along with the other Ironborn at Winterfell.
- Drennan (portrayed by David Coakley) is an Ironborn raider, under the command of Theon Greyjoy, during the War of the Five Kings. He, under Theon's command, seizes Winterfell from Bran Stark. Drennan is seduced by Osha, whilst guarding Bran and Rickon Starl, and his throat is slit, allowing them to escape.
- Euron Greyjoy (portrayed by Pilou Asbæk)
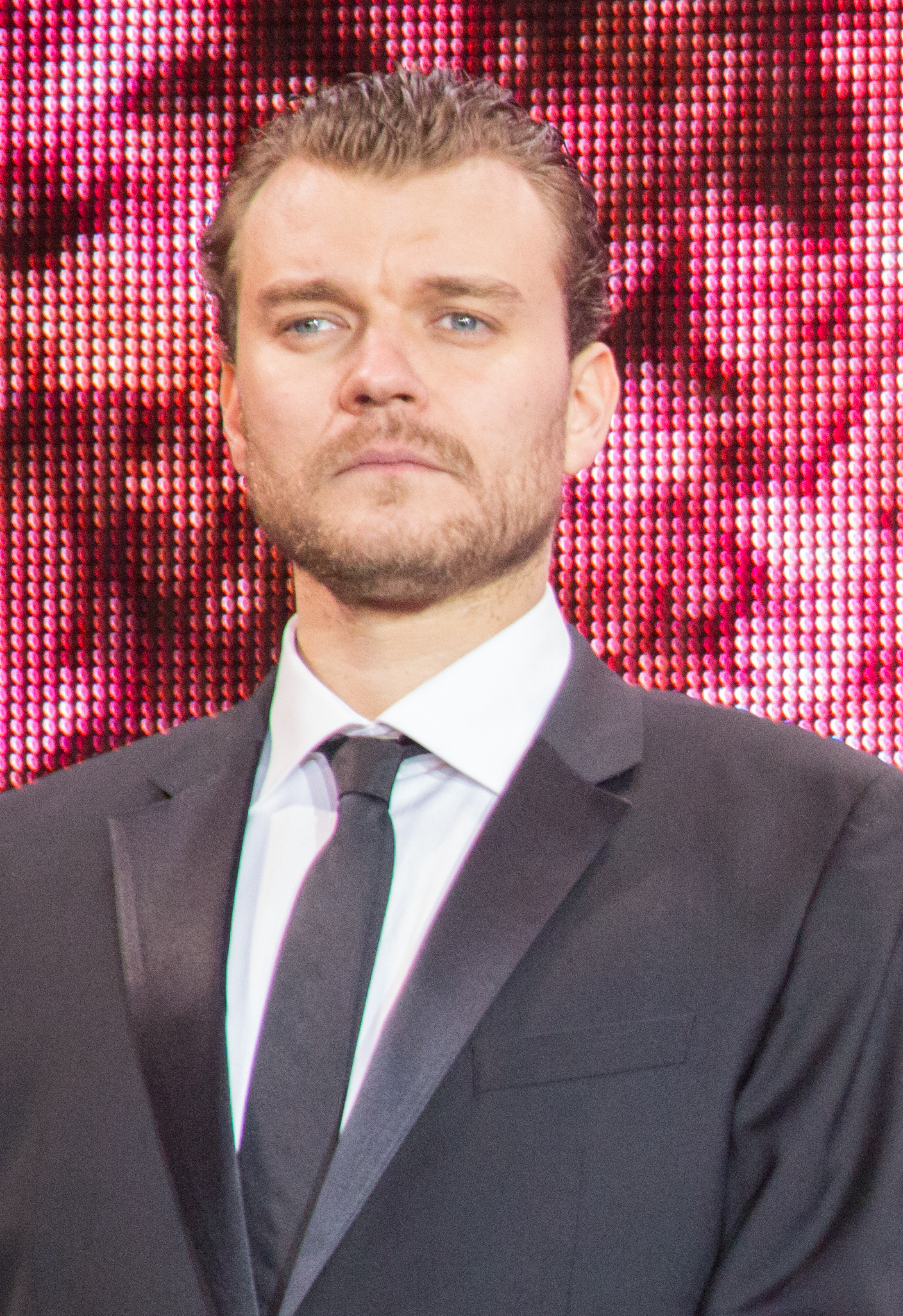
  Pilou Asbæk
  is the brother of King Balon Greyjoy, and the uncle of Theon and Yara Greyjoy. Euron is an infamous pirate who has terrorized seas all around the world. He is cunning, ruthless, with a touch of madness. He kills Balon Greyjoy by throwing him off a rope bridge, declaring that Balon's time is past and that it is time for a new king. At the Kingsmoot he confesses to killing Balon, but convinces the Ironborn that Balon was a poor military commander and declares that he will seduce Daenerys Targaryen and give her the Iron Fleet to conquer Westeros. The Ironborn declare Euron as their king, but before Euron can put Theon and Yara to death he discovers they have fled with the best ships of the Iron Fleet. Undeterred, he orders the Ironborn to begin constructing a new fleet. He uses this fleet to attack Yara's fleet with fire. He kills two Sand Snakes and captures Yara, Ellaria Sand and Tyene Sand. He gives the Sands to Cersei and keeps Yara prisoner. When he meets Theon he taunts him over his captive sister. Euron later becomes a close partner of Cersei Lannister during the final weeks of her reign and organizes the defense of King's Landing in anticipation of an attack by Daenerys Targaryen. Euron's navy is later destroyed by Daenerys and her dragon, Drogon. While King's Landing falls, he fights and wounds Jaime Lannister but is defeated and ultimately killed.
- Harrag (portrayed by Brendan Cowell) is an Ironborn raider, under the command of Yara Greyjoy. After Euron Greyjoy attacks the Iron Fleet, he refuses Theon Greyjoy. Later, then Theon states that he is going to rescue Yara, Harreq refuses to help him, citing that they are going to raid a remote island, breaking Yara's pact with Daenerys Targaryen. Harreq fights with Theon, and ultimately loses.

=== House Lannister ===
- Gregor Clegane (portrayed by Conan Stevens in season 1, by Ian Whyte in season 2, and by Hafþór Júlíus Björnsson from season 4 onwards)
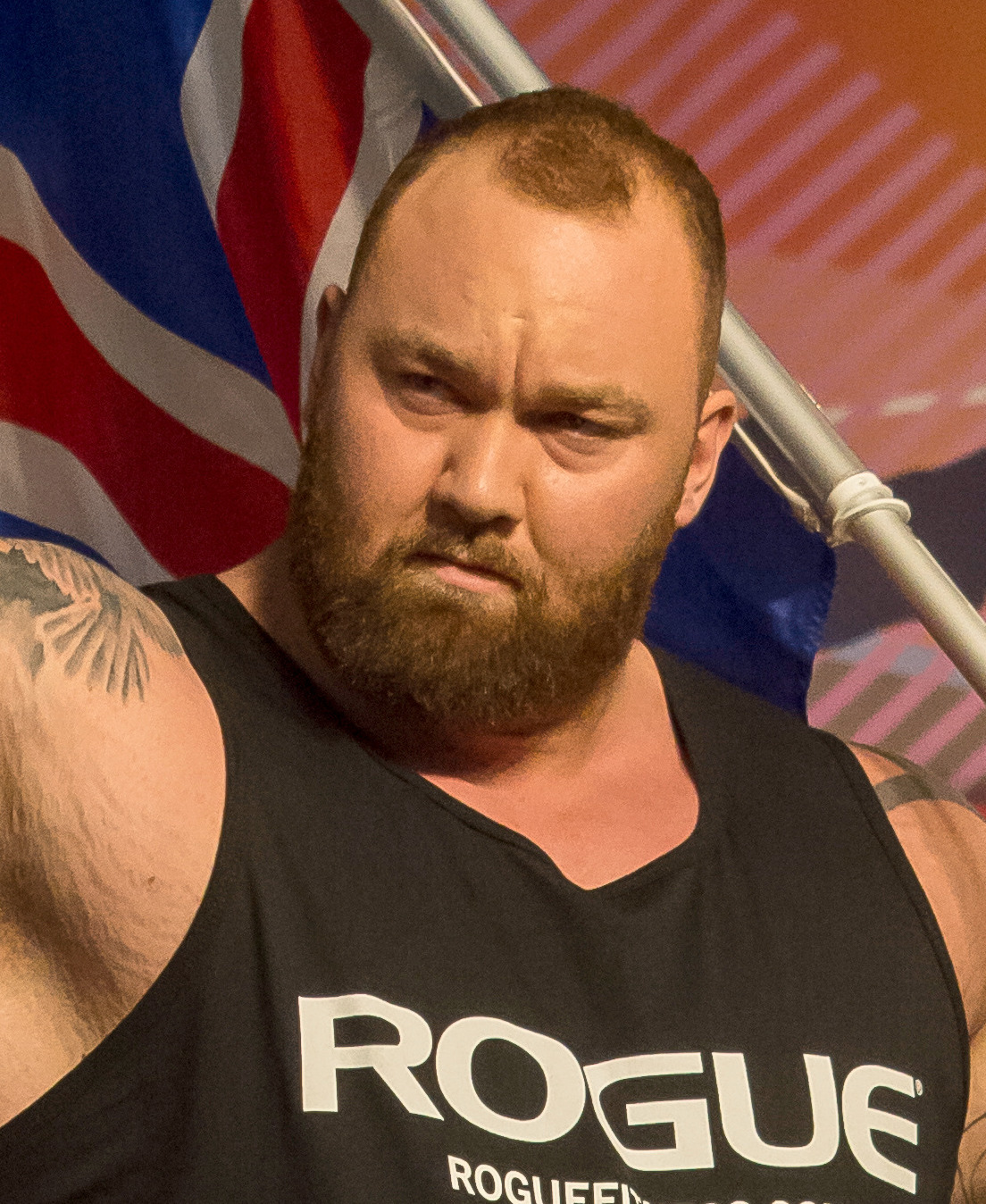
  Hafþór Júlíus Björnsson
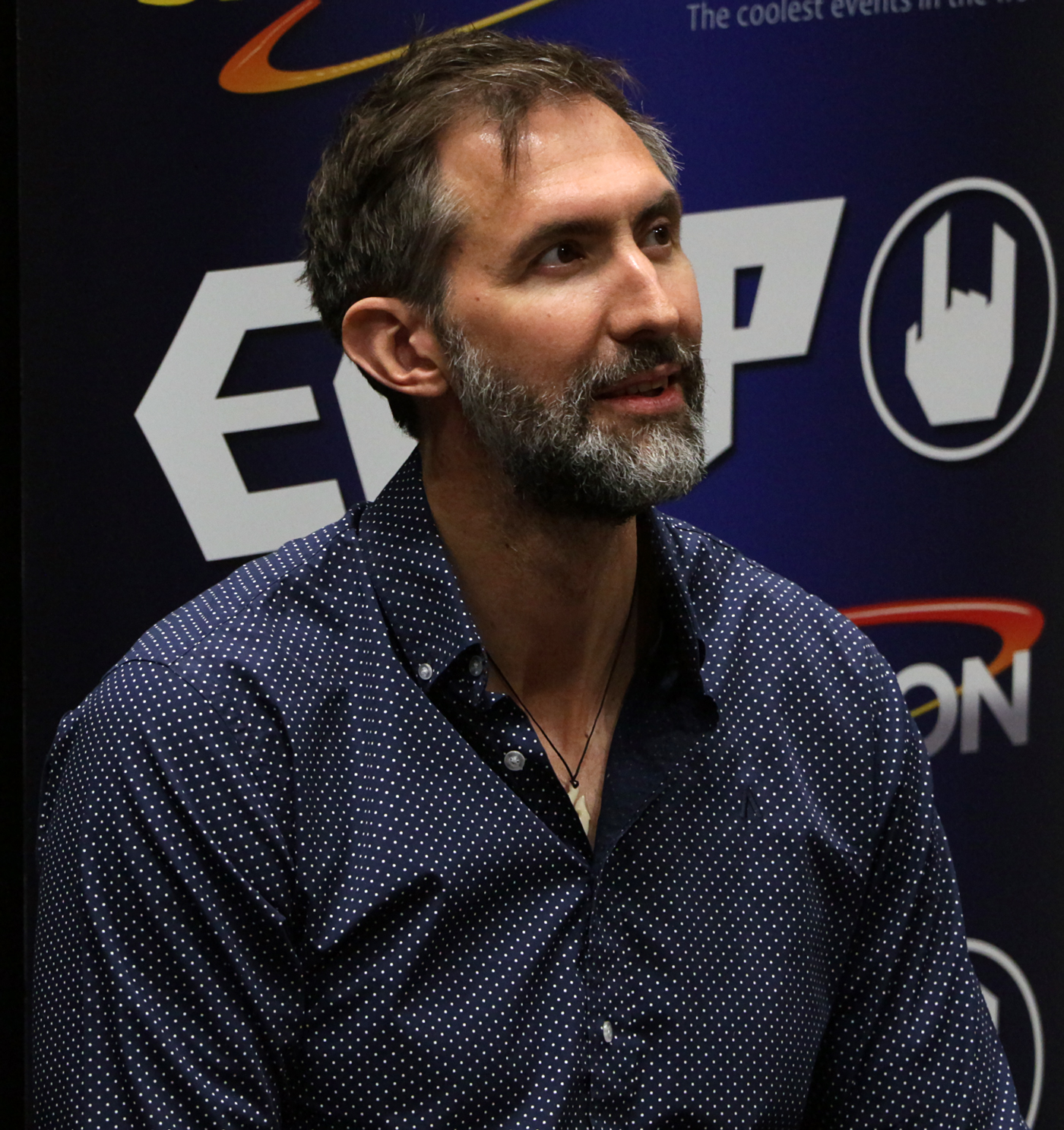
  Ian Whyte
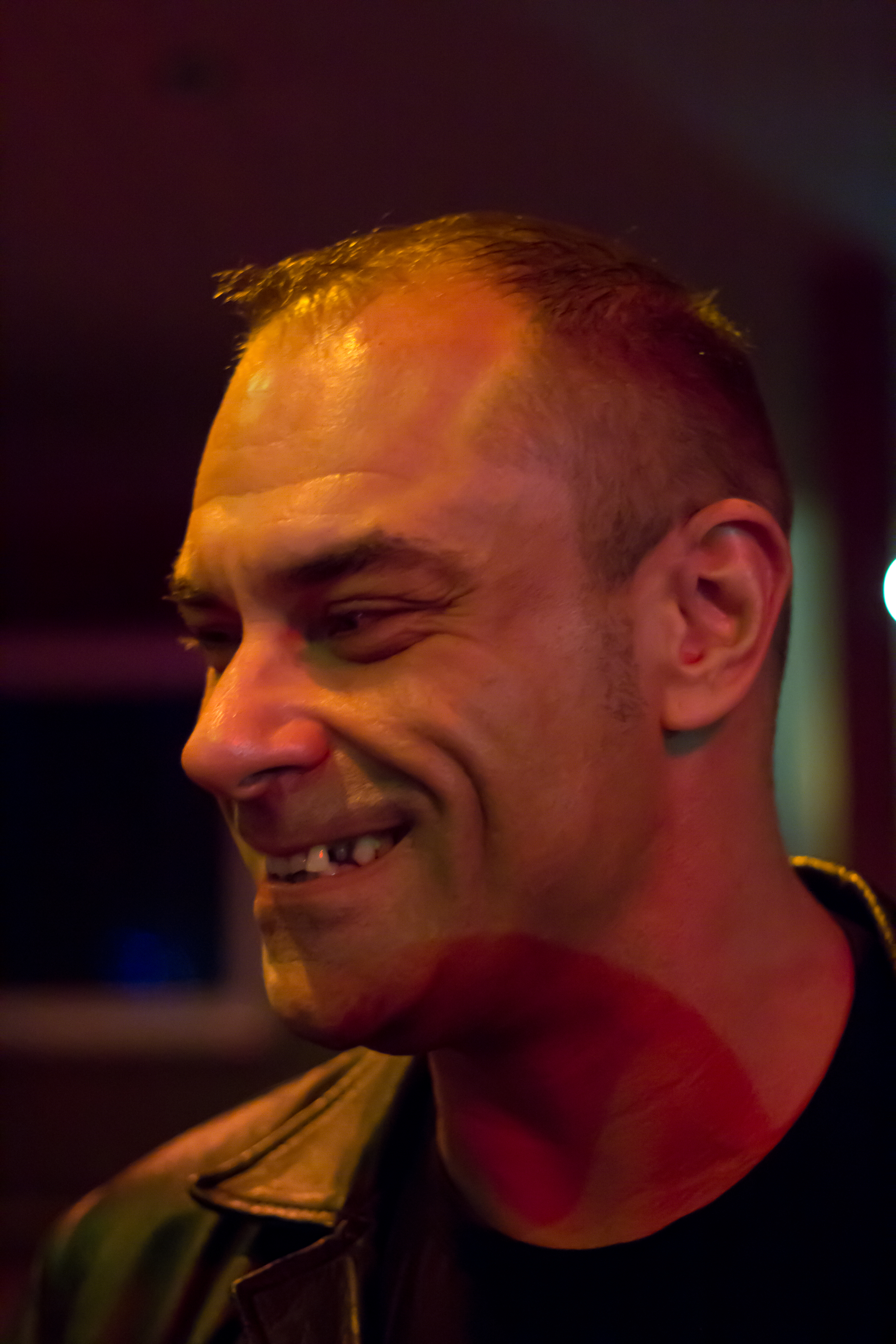
  Conan Stevens
  A huge knight and the elder brother of Sandor Clegane. Called "the Mountain That Rides", he is known for his incredibly cruel nature and uncontrollable temper. He is the Lord of Clegane's Keep in the Wastelands. His size and strength make him a fearsome warrior, and he has earned a reputation for cruelty and brutality. He is able to wield a two-handed sword one handed. When they were children, Gregor shoved Sandor's face into a brazier, gruesomely scarring him. In season 1, Tywin Lannister sends him to raid the Riverlands. Beric Dondarrion is sent to arrest Gregor. When war breaks out, Gregor is given command of Tywin's vanguard and left flank and leads his men through intimidation. In season 2 he is left to command Harrenhal in Tywin's absence and to find and destroy "the Brotherhood Without Banners", invoking the escape of Arya, Gendry and Hot Pie from Harrenhal. He later abandons the castle after slaughtering the prisoners and is defeated by Edmure Tully at the Stone Mill, but manages to escape back to the Westerlands. Robb chides his uncle, having planned to draw the Mountain into a trap of his own making to be captured or killed. In season 4, Gregor is chosen as Cersei's champion for Tyrion's trial by combat, and fights Oberyn Martell, Tyrion's champion who wants to kill Clegane as revenge for the needless murder of his sister, Elia Martell Targaryen. Oberyn inflicts several serious injuries on Clegane with a weapon that is laced with poison, but Clegane kills Oberyn by crushing his skull, while admitting that he did rape Elia, killed her children and enjoyed it, before collapsing from his own injuries. It is later revealed that Clegane has been poisoned with manticore venom, a poison that Oberyn had laced his weapon with, and that he is slowly dying. Cersei enlists ex-maester Qyburn to save him, though Qyburn claims that the procedure will "change" Clegane. The procedure is a seemingly a success, as Gregor has become active again and joins the Kingsguard as a personal knight for Cersei, though the procedure has changed his physical appearance and his behavior. In the sixth season, he continues to act as Cersei's bodyguard to intimidate all those who may bother or mock her. After Cersei destroys the Great Sept of Baelor and retakes power, she has Gregor torture Septa Unella in revenge for Unella torturing her during her time in prison. Fighting his brother, Sandor, the pair perish in the firestorms caused by Daenerys Targaryen.
- Lancel Lannister (portrayed by Eugene Simon)
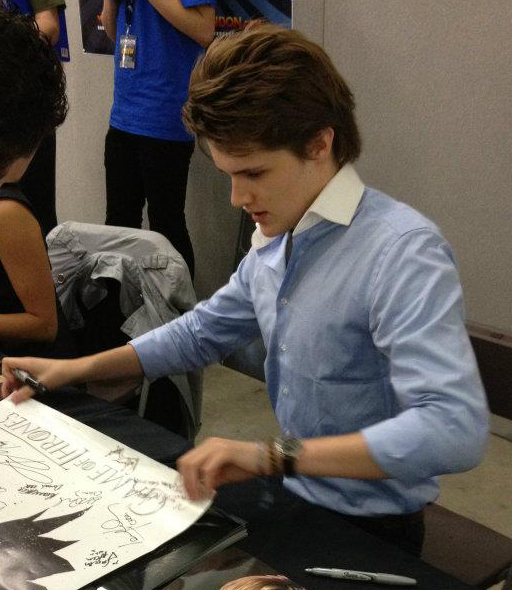
  Eugene Simon
  The eldest son of Kevan Lannister and cousin of Cersei, Jaime, and Tyrion Lannister. He served as King Robert's squire; in which he is clumsy and incompetent in his duties leading Robert to dislike him intensely. In season 2, Cersei knights him for his part in Robert's death. When Jaime goes to war, Cersei takes Lancel as a lover because he resembles her brother. Tyrion eventually discovers the affair and blackmails Lancel into spying for him. During an attack on King's Landing, Lancel guards Cersei's son King Joffrey Baratheon and takes a serious wound in the fighting, causing him to retreat. When Joffrey later abandons the battle out of cowardice, Lancel pleads with Cersei to let him take Joffrey back to the battle to inspire the troops, but Cersei, clearly more concerned for Joffrey than the city, refuses to listen. In season 5, he and his father return to King's Landing to attend Tywin's funeral. Lancel joins the sparrows, a devout religious movement, and apologises to Cersei for the sins they committed together, such as their affair and conspiracy to murder Robert Baratheon. With the reestablishment of the Faith Militant, Lancel abandons his family name and leads the sparrows on a rampage throughout King's Landing, arresting Ser Loras Tyrell in the process. Later, on Littlefinger and Olenna Tyrell's urging, he confesses his own sins to the High Sparrow, which leads to Cersei's arrest. In the sixth season, Lancel continues to serve in the Faith Militant. On the day of Cersei and Loras's trial, he is lured by one of Qyburn's little birds to the catacombs underneath the Great Sept of Baelor, where he is stabbed in the spine, rendering him unable to use his legs. He spots a cache of wildfire rigged to explode and crawls towards it, but is too late to stop the detonation and is the first to die.
- Kevan Lannister (portrayed by Ian Gelder) is Lord Tywin's younger brother, a skilled warrior who is loyal to but overshadowed by him. Unlike his older brother, Kevan is very amiable and cares more about the safety of his family members even if it will humiliate the family's honour. In season 1, he is present when Tyrion returns from the Vale and informs him on Jaime's military victories against Tully bannermen. After Jaime's capture, he suggests to his brother that they "should sue for peace" which is immediately refuted by Tyrion who reminds that Ned Stark's beheading prevents it. In season 2, he sits on a war council in Harrenhal, surmising (correctly) that Robb Stark would not march on Casterly Rock until "at full force" and also suggesting that Cersei and her children leave King's Landing before Stannis Baratheon sacks the city, but the proposition is countered by Tywin, refusing to surrender the Iron Throne. In season 5, he returns to King's Landing to attend Tywin's funeral alongside his only surviving son, Lancel, who has joined the Sparrows movement, which Kevan disapproves of. He later refuses to serve on Cersei's Small Council, in spite her offering him the position of "Master of War", questioning her authority, and returning to Casterly Rock until the King himself calls for him. When his niece is arrested by the Faith Militant for sleeping with his son among other sins, Grand Maester Pycelle summons him back to offer him the position of Hand of the King. He later is present at Cersei's return to the Red Keep, immediately after her enduring Walk of Atonement. In the sixth season, Kevan continues to serve as Tommen's Hand while attempting to deal with the High Sparrow without bloodshed and spurning Cersei's attempts to regain influence in the royal court. On the day of Cersei's trial, Kevan is killed when Cersei has the Great Sept of Baelor destroyed with wildfire.
- Leo Lefford (portrayed by Vinnie McCabe) is a powerful Bannerman to Lord Tywin, who fought for him against House Stark. He is Head of House Lefford and Lord of The Golden Tooth.
- Addam Marbrand (portrayed by B.J. Hogg) is the son of Lord Damon Marbrand, and heir to Lannisport, and a bannerman of Lord Tywin Lannister.
- Podrick Payne (portrayed by Daniel Portman)
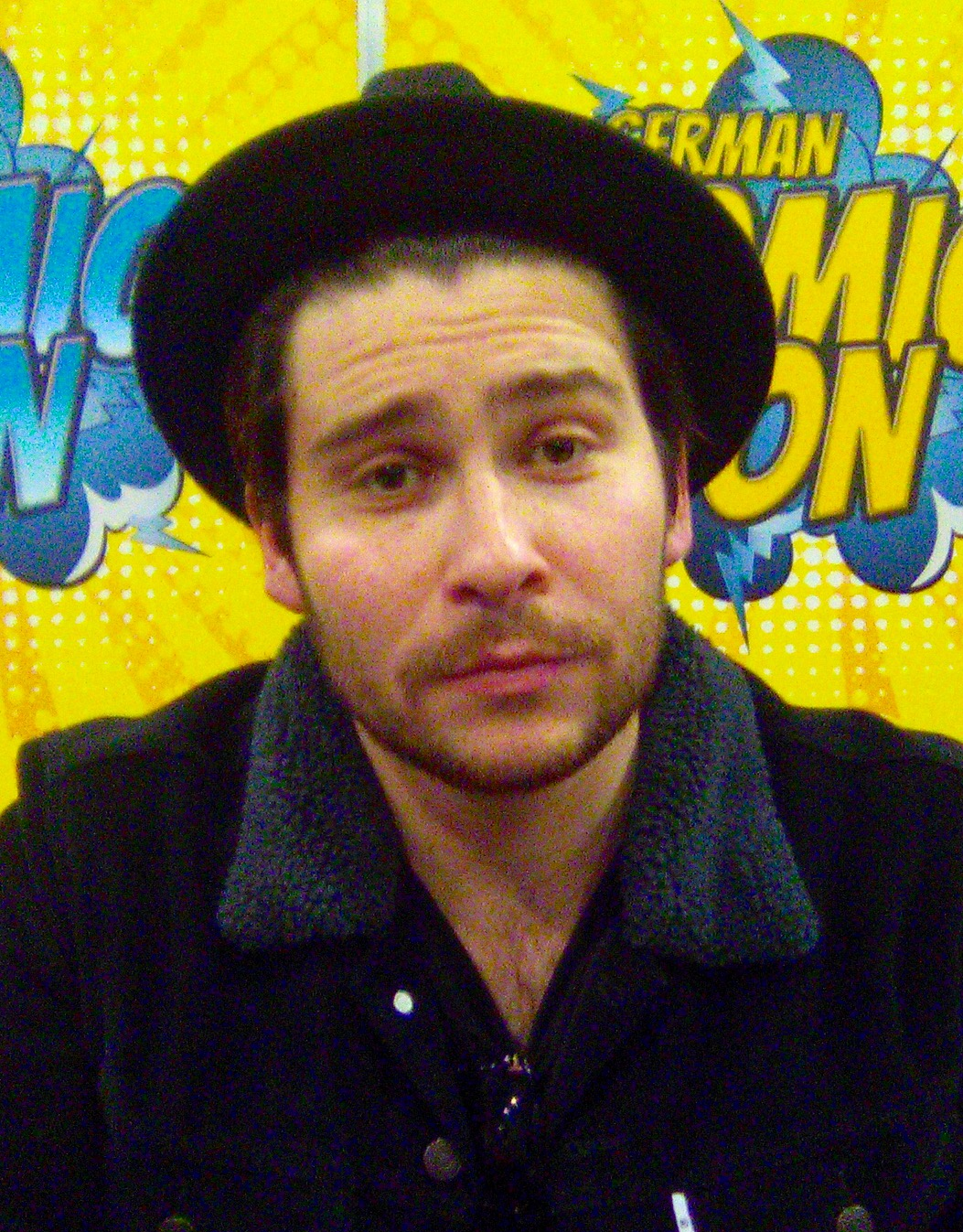
  Daniel Portman
  is a young squire assigned to Tyrion Lannister. He is a member of House Payne of the Wastelands. In season 2, he fights alongside Tyrion at the Battle of the Blackwater and saves him from an assassination by Ser Mandon Moore. In season 4, Podrick is anonymously offered a knighthood in exchange for testifying against Tyrion at his trial for the murder of King Joffrey, but he does not accept or reject the offer – Tyrion orders Podrick to leave King's Landing before he is killed. Tyrion makes his brother, Jaime, assure Podrick's safety, who assigns him to serve Brienne of Tarth. Podrick initially appears to be incompetent but slowly wins Brienne's trust. Podrick and Brienne eventually find Arya Stark and Sandor Clegane near the Vale. A brawl ensues between Brienne and Sandor, and Podrick loses sight of Arya, much to Brienne's annoyance. Podrick and Brienne then search for Sansa, finding her with Petyr Baelish and some Vale knights in an inn. A fight ensues, and Podrick is only barely rescued by Brienne. They decide to follow Sansa and Baelish north. During their journey, Brienne slowly opens up to Podrick, and offers to teach him how to use a sword and defend himself. Brienne and Podrick reach the North and take shelter in a nearby inn, sending Sansa a message to signal for help should she need it. Podrick later alerts Brienne when Stannis arrives with his army to retake Winterfell. Podrick and Brienne later save Sansa and Theon Greyjoy from pursuing Bolton soldiers and Podrick manages to slay one with his newfound skills. He and Brienne escort Sansa to find Jon Snow at Castle Black. Sansa sends Brienne and Podrick to the Riverlands to seek the aid of Brynden Tully, where Podrick briefly reunites with Bronn. When Riverrun falls to the Freys, Brynden apparently sacrifices himself to allow Brienne and Podrick to escape in a boat. Though they are seen by Jaime Lannister, he lets them go. At the parley in the Dragonpit, Pod meets Bronn and at Bronn's suggestion they go for a drink. In season 8, Podrick participates in the Battle of Winterfell, and becomes a member of King Bran Stark's Kingsguard, and is knighted.
- Alton Lannister (portrayed by Karl Davies) is a cousin of Cersei, Jaime and Tyrion Lannister, and a captive of Robb Stark. In the books there is no character by this name. Here the character Cleos Frey, also a cousin to the Lannisters, has the role of being a captive of House Stark and delivering terms to House Lannister. While held prisoner in the same cell he talks with his cousin Jaime at Stark's camp, he talks about the time he was allowed to prove himself by squiring for Jaime in a tourney, however during this encounter he is killed by Jaime in an attempt to escape.
- Polliver (portrayed by Andy Kellegher) is a Lannister man-at-arms who comes into possession of Arya Stark's sword; Needle. He captures Arya – believing her to be a recruit of the Night's Watch called "Arry" and takes her sword which he then uses to kill a crippled Lommy after he asks Polliver to carry him. In season 4, he inadvertently crosses paths with Arya and Sandor Clegane in an inn in the north. After a brief exchange of insults, a fight breaks out and Polliver's comrades are slain by Clegane. Arya wounds Polliver from behind, retrieves Needle and kills him in exactly the same manner that he killed Lommy.
- Amory Lorch (portrayed by Fintan McKeown) is a knight and loyal but brutal bannerman of House Lannister. He catches Arya in stealing a parchment containing war orders concerning her brother Robb Stark. She manages to escape him, then finds and hurries the assassin Jaqen H'ghar, to kill Ser Amory to repay the second of the three "lives" he owes her. Before Ser Amory can denounce Arya, he drops dead on the doorstep of Tywin's chambers with a poisoned dart lodged in his neck, as Tywin (who comes to believe the attempt was on his life) raises the alarm. The Mountain subsequently kills a number of Lannister soldiers in his hunt for the culprit, but Jaqen leaves Harrenhal without being captured.
- The Tickler (portrayed by Anthony Morris) is a soldier under the service of Ser Gregor Clegane, who specializes in torture. During the War of the Five Kings, the Tickler tortures a variety of peasants, whilst attempting to gain information on the Brotherhood Without Banners. He is the first man killed by the assassin Jaqen H'ghar as part of his debt to Arya Stark.
- Bernadette (portrayed by Sara Dylan) A handmaiden of Sansa Stark, and later Cersei Lannister. When Sansa has her first period, Bernadette goes to inform to Cersei, but is threatened by Shae. In season 7, Bernadette uncovers Cersei and Jamie Lannister's incestuous relationship.
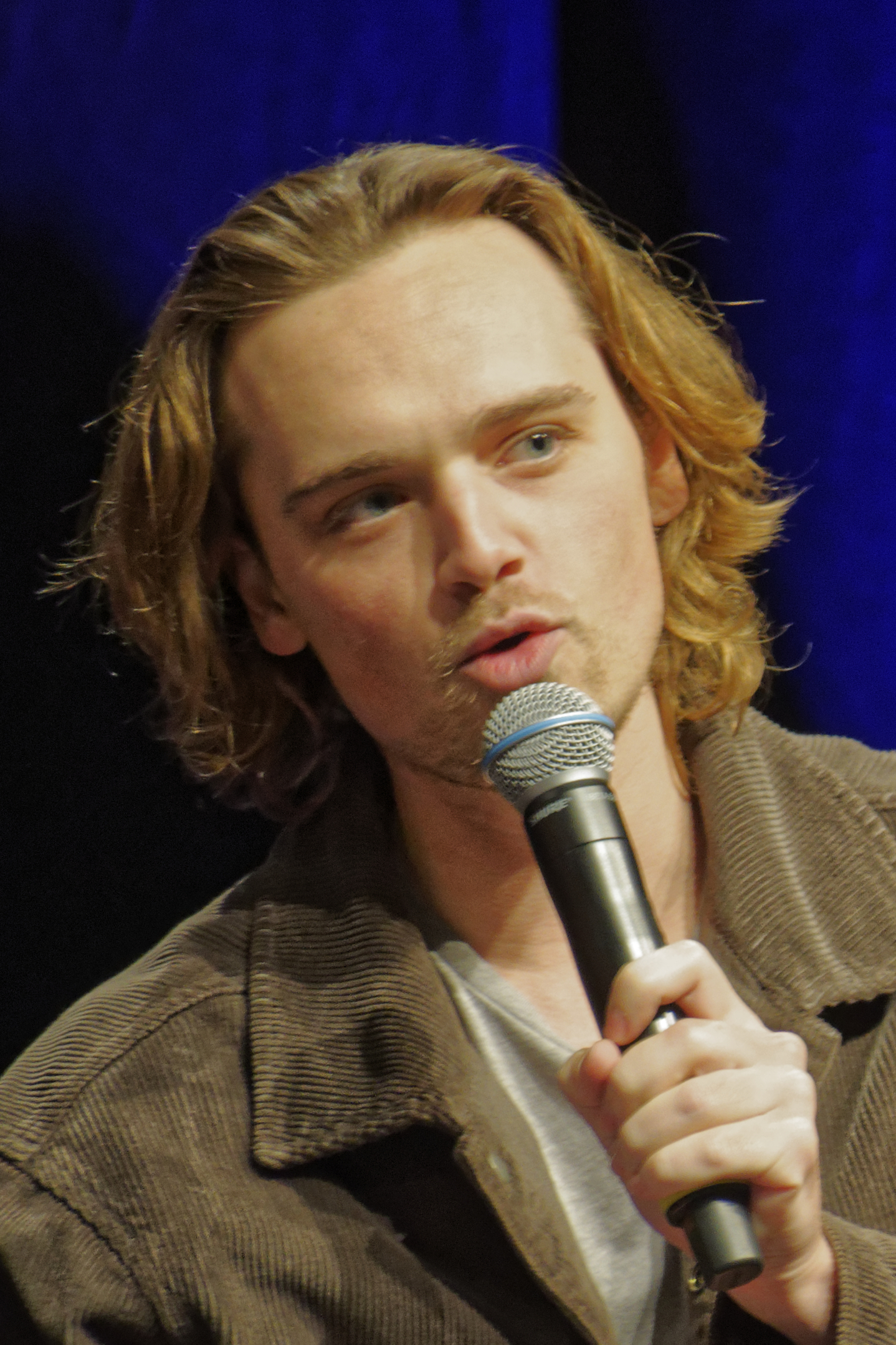
- Dean-Charles Chapman
  Martyn Lannister (portrayed by Dean-Charles Chapman) is the son of Lord Kevan Lannister, and brother to Lancel and Willem Lannister. Martyn is captured by Lord Edmure Tully after the Battle of the Fords, alongside his brother. He is murdered by Lord Rickard Karstark in his cell, alongside his brother, to avenge the death of his son Torrhen by Jamie Lannister.
- Willem Lannister (portrayed by Timothy Gibbons) is the son of Lord Kevan Lannister, and brother to Lancel and Martyn Lannister. Willem is captured by Lord Edmure Tully after the Battle of the Fords, alongside his brother. He is murdered by Lord Rickard Karstark in his cell, alongside his brother, to avenge the death of his son Torrhen by Jamie Lannister.
- Maggy the Frog (portrayed by Jodhi May) was a woods witch, who lived near Castery Rock, during the youth of Cersei Lannister. In a flashback, Cersei threatens Maggy into answering three questions about her future, telling her that she would marry "the king", and that she would become queen, but would be overthrown by another, younger queen, and learns that she would have three children, telling her that gold would be their crowns, and gold their burial shrouds, implying that all of Cersei's children would predecease her.
- Melara Hetherspoon (portrayed by Isabella Steinbarth) was a childhood friend of Queen Cersei Lannister, who in her youth, visited Maggy the Frog.

=== House Martell ===
- Oberyn Martell (portrayed by Pedro Pascal)
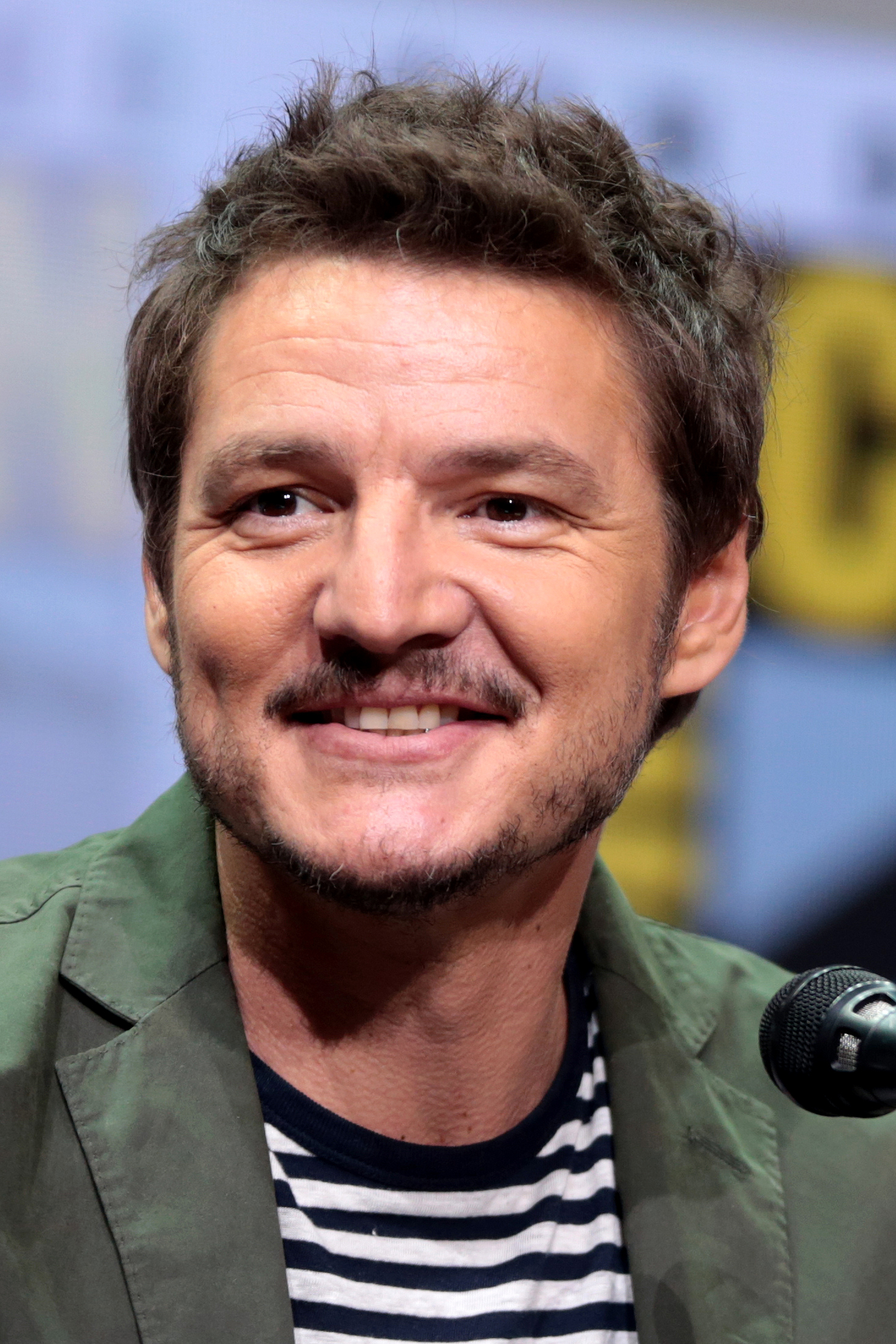
  Pedro Pascal
  is the Prince of Dorne and younger brother of Doran Martell, known as the Red Viper. A renowned warrior and traveler, Oberyn has eight bastard daughters, called the Sand Snakes. His sister, Elia Targaryen, was raped and killed during the Sack of King's Landing by Ser Gregor Clegane. In season 4, Oberyn arrives in King's Landing with his paramour, Ellaria Sand, to attend Joffrey's wedding in his brother's stead, and his meeting with Tyrion makes it clear that he has actually come to take revenge against the Lannisters for their role in the deaths of his sister, nephew and niece. At the wedding, Joffrey dies after being poisoned, and Tywin initially suspects Oberyn of having a hand in the murder since Oberyn has a past with poison chemistry, while Oberyn denies involvement and accuses Tywin of ordering Gregor Clegane to rape and murder Elia. The two reach a settlement when Tywin promises Oberyn a meeting with Clegane in exchange for Oberyn serving as one of the three judges at Tyrion's trial. At the trial, Oberyn implies that he is not convinced of Tyrion's guilt, and openly questions Cersei's testimony and asks Shae why Tyrion would tell her about all of his plans to murder Joffrey if he was the perpetrator. When Tyrion demands a trial by combat and Gregor Clegane is chosen as Cersei's champion, Oberyn volunteers to fight for Tyrion, proclaiming that he will exact his vengeance, starting with Ser Gregor. Martell valiantly fights Clegane, his superior speed making up for Clegane's size, and manages to wound him in the shoulder and the leg, flooring him. Refusing to kill him immediately, Oberyn furiously demands that Clegane admit to raping and killing Elia and her children, and that the order came from Tywin himself. Distracted for a moment, Oberyn is floored by Clegane, who – in a manner self-admittedly paraphrasing the murder of Elia – knocks out his teeth, straddles him and slowly gouges out his eyes, admitting to the rape and murder of Elia before crushing his skull. Tyrion is subsequently sentenced to death, but Oberyn's objective of vengeance was not in vain, since his spear is revealed to have been laced with the deadly venom of the manticore, which is slowly killing Clegane. Oberyn's death, however, throws House Martell into chaos, since Ellaria is driven insane to the point that she kills Myrcella Baratheon, Doran Martell and Trystane Martell (Oberyn's own brother and nephew, respectively) to get revenge against the Lannisters.
- Trystane Martell (portrayed by Toby Sebastian)
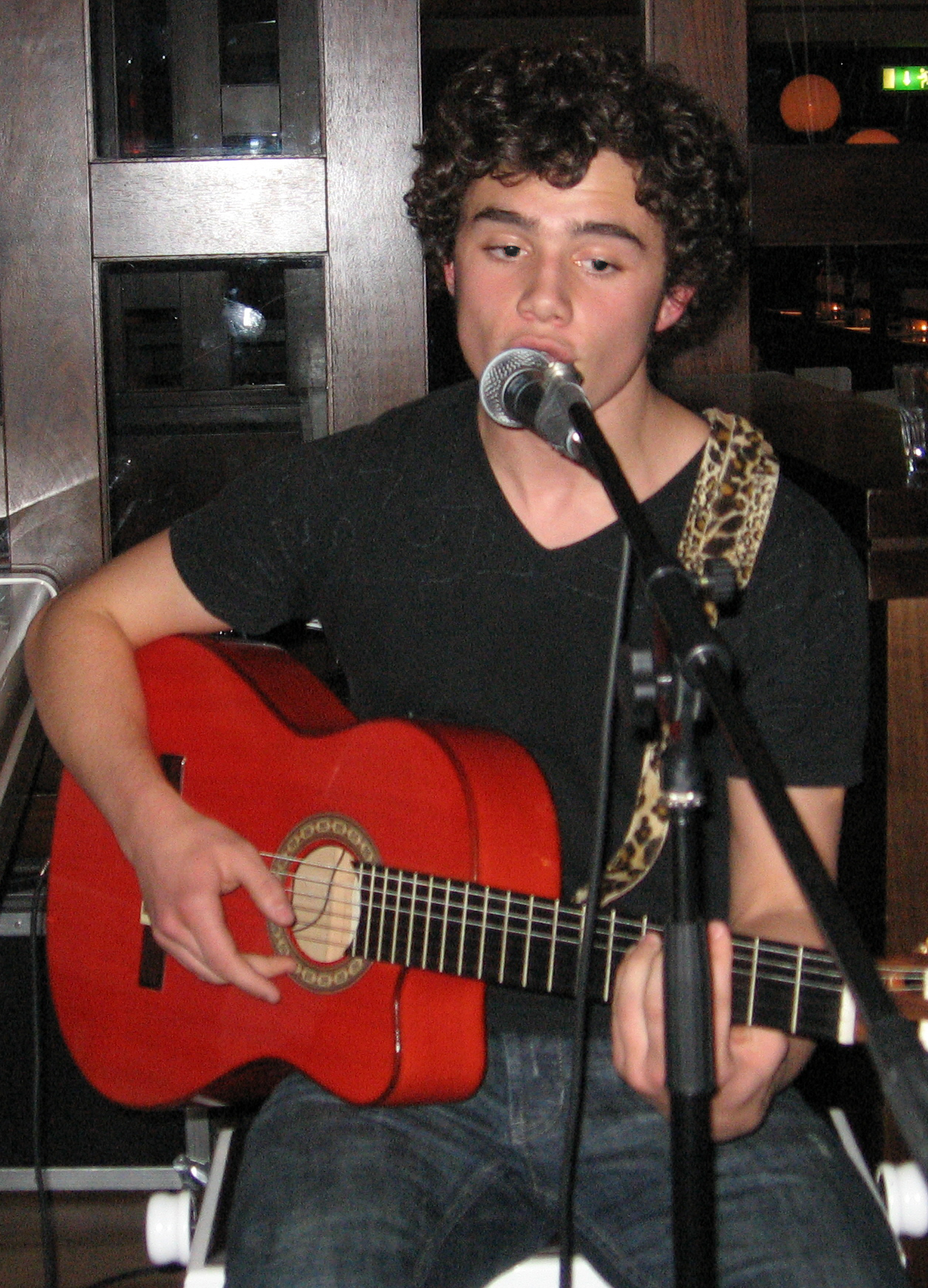
  Toby Sebastian
  is Prince Doran's son and heir to Dorne. His father betrothed him to Myrcella Baratheon as part of the alliance offered by Tyrion Lannister, then acting as Hand of the King. He and Myrcella later grow to love each other and Trystane offers to ask his father if they can marry immediately. He is struck by Bronn when he and Jaime Lannister arrive to take Myrcella back, but Trystane later shows Bronn mercy and decides not to have him mutilated, satisfied with having Areo Hotah strike him in a similar manner instead. Doran allows Trystane to accompany Myrcella back to King's Landing to take his uncle Oberyn's place on the Small Council, but Trystane's life is put in danger when Ellaria Sand secretly poisons Myrcella just as their boat leaves Dorne. Though Jaime prepares to send him back to Dorne unharmed, Trystane refuses to leave, insisting on being present for Myrcella's funeral, so Jaime instructs him to stay on the boat for his own safety. However, as he is painting funeral stones for Myrcella, he is ambushed and killed by Obara and Nymeria Sand, his own cousins, sent by Ellaria Sand to kill him as part of her coup, though most believe his death was Cersei's doing.
- Doran Martell (portrayed by Alexander Siddig)
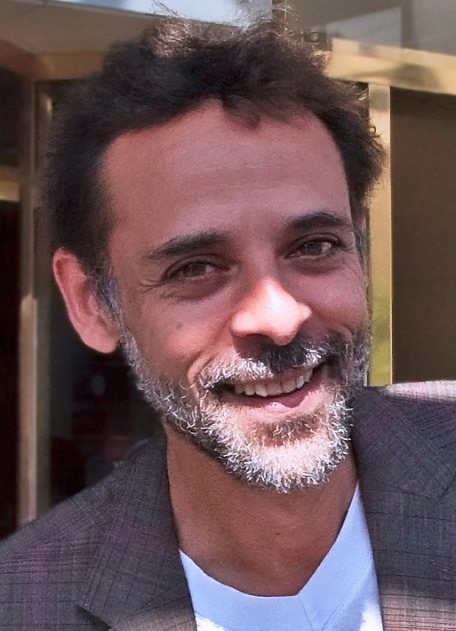
  Alexander Siddig
  is the ruling lord of Dorne and older brother to the late Prince Oberyn Martell. Unlike his brother, Doran is even-tempered and deliberate. In season 4, he is invited to Joffrey Baratheon and Margaery Tyrell's wedding, but due to suffering from gout, he is unable to attend and sends Oberyn in his stead. After Oberyn is slain by Gregor Clegane, Doran grieves but takes no action, claiming that Oberyn suffered a self-imposed death in a trial by combat, a legal act, and coldly rebutts Ellaria's proposal to harm Myrcella Baratheon to exact revenge on the Lannisters. However, after a skirmish in which Jaime Lannister and Bronn fight with the Sand Snakes over possession of Myrcella, Doran orders all locked up, including Ellaria. He later grants Jaime an audience and agrees to allow Myrcella to return to King's Landing along with his son, Trystane Martell, Myrcella's betrothed, while threatening Ellaria and the Sand Snakes with severe consequences should they defy him again. However, Ellaria later secretly poisons Myrcella despite Doran's warning. In the sixth season, Doran finds out about Myrcella's assassination, but he is immediately killed by Ellaria, while his men stand and watch as he dies.
- Areo Hotah (portrayed by DeObia Oparei) is the long-serving captain of Doran Martell's palace guard, renowned for his loyalty and his longaxe. He arrests Jaime Lannister, Bronn, Ellaria Sand and the Sand Snakes following their battle over Myrcella Baratheon, but releases them all on Doran's request. As retribution for striking Trystane Martell, Areo strikes Bronn across the face. In the sixth season, after Doran finds out about Myrcella's death at Ellaria's hands, he is stabbed and poisoned by Tyene Sand, and dies immediately.
- Tyene Sand (portrayed by Rosabell Laurenti Sellers)
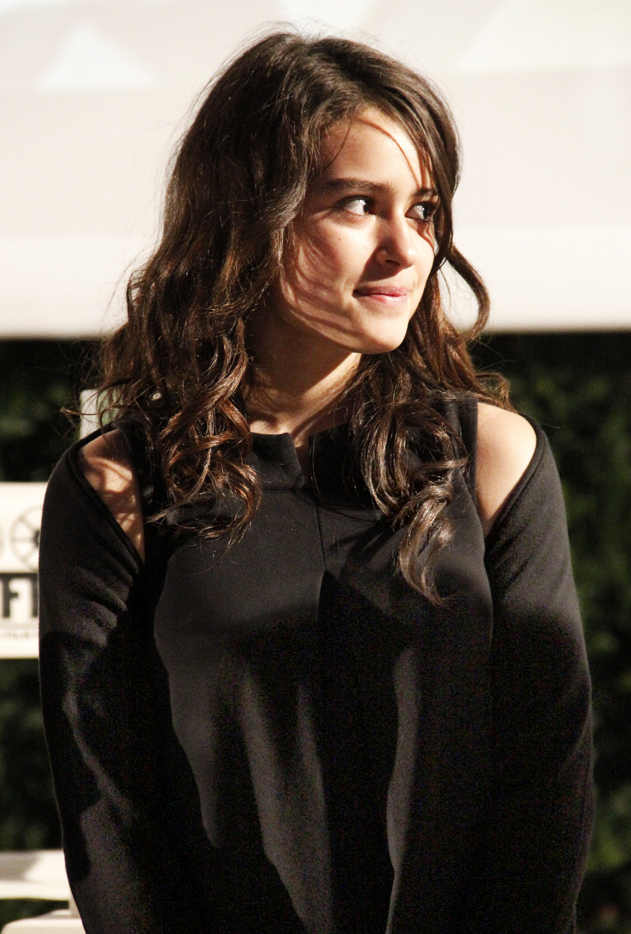
  Rosabell Laurenti Sellers
  is the daughter of Prince Oberyn Martell by Ellaria Sand. Tyene is fiercer than she looks, especially with her twin daggers. She assists her mother in her plot to assassinate Myrcella Baratheon as revenge against Cersei, whose actions led to Oberyn's death. In the ensuing fight with Jaime Lannister and Bronn, she poisons Bronn by striking him with a poison-coated dagger before they are all arrested. In the cells, she strips in front of Bronn to hasten his heartbeat as well as the poison's effects, though she shows him mercy and gives him the cure. She later synthesises a similar poison for Ellaria, who uses it to poison Myrcella. She gives Ellaria the antidote before she too is killed. When Doran finds out, Tyene kills Areo Hotah while Ellaria stabs Doran in the chest. Tyene subsequently watches her own uncle die without remorse. She is later present when Ellaria meets with Olenna Tyrell to discuss an alliance with Daenerys Targaryen, where she is silenced by Olenna before she can speak. While journeying to Sunspear with her sisters and Ellaria aboard Yara Greyjoy's ship, Tyene is captured by Euron Greyjoy while defending her mother and taken as a captive aboard his flagship, Silence. Given as a gift to Cersei, Tyene is chained with her mother in a dungeon. Cersei uses a version of the poison on Tyene and leaves her chained in front of her mother so that Ellaria can watch her daughter not just die but decompose.
- Nymeria Sand (portrayed by Jessica Henwick)
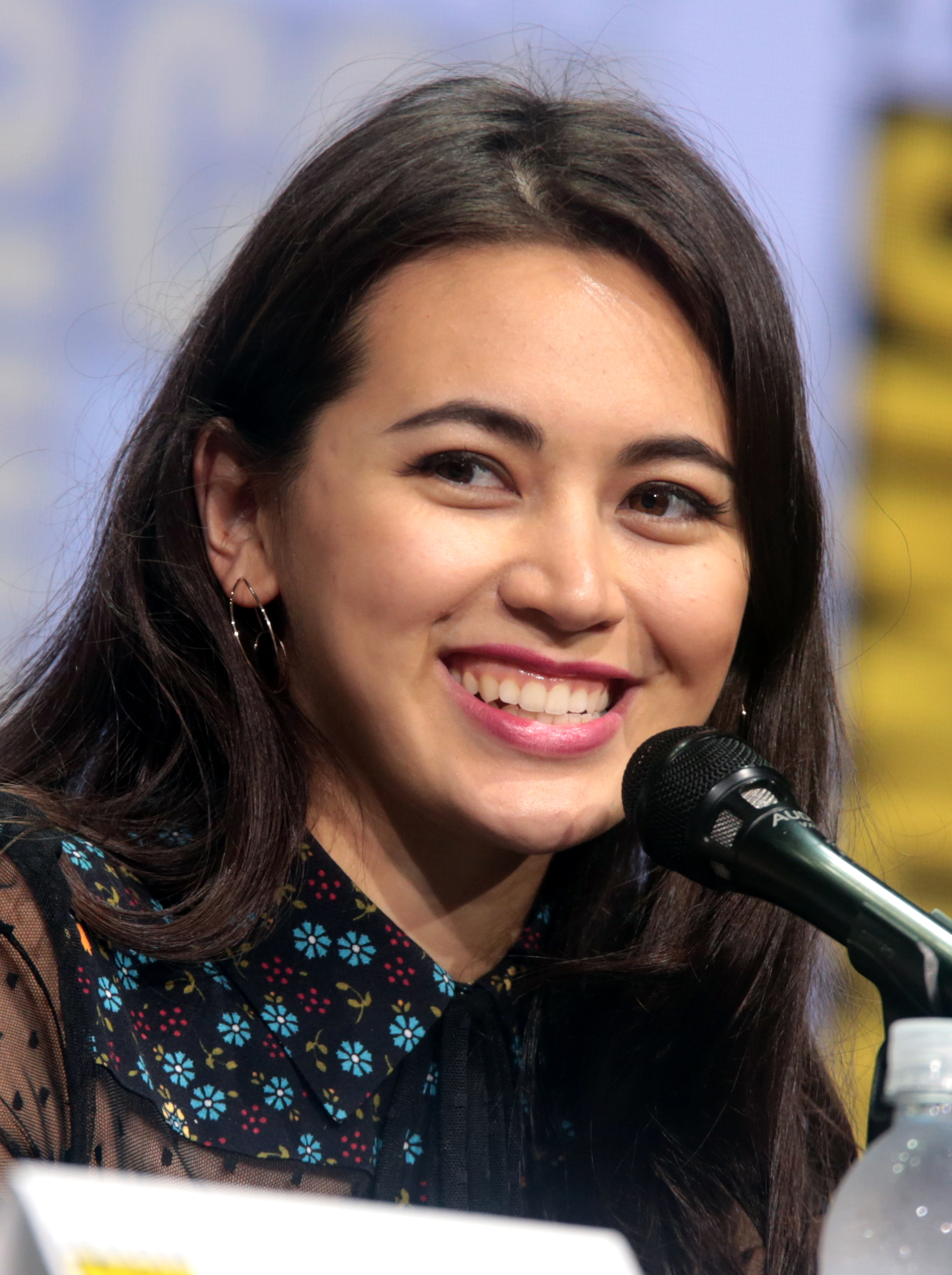
  Jessica Henwick
  is the second eldest of Prince Oberyn's bastard daughters. Her mother was an Eastern noblewoman who brought Nym up to be cultured, graceful and deadly with a whip. She assists Ellaria Sand in her plot to assassinate Myrcella Baratheon as revenge against Cersei Lannister, whose actions led to Oberyn's death. Though she is briefly imprisoned by her uncle Doran for her treachery, Ellaria murders Myrcella, and Nym joins her in her coup by ambushing and murdering Trystane Martell. She is later present when Ellaria meets with Olenna Tyrell to discuss an alliance with Daenerys Targaryen, where she is silenced by Olenna. In season 7, Nymeria accompanies Ellaria, Yara and Theon Greyjoy, and her sisters on the journey to Sunspear from Dragonstone. After they are ambushed by Euron Greyjoy and his fleet, both Nymeria and Obara confront Euron while Tyene protects Ellaria. After the Lord Reaper of the Iron Islands kills Obara, an enraged Nymeria attacks him with her whip, only to be choked to death and then hung from the prow of the ship with her weapon, next to her sister.
- Obara Sand (portrayed by Keisha Castle-Hughes)
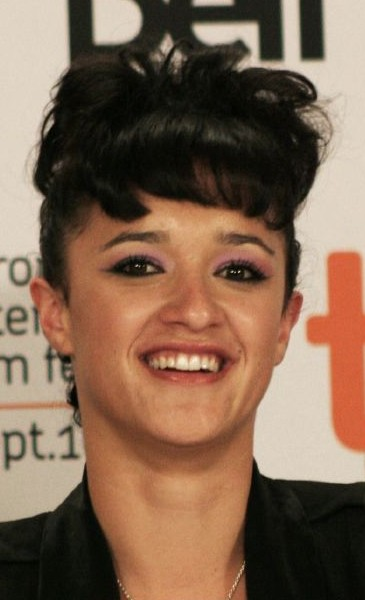
  Keisha Castle-Hughes
  is a fearsome warrior and the eldest bastard daughter of Prince Oberyn Martell. Her mother was a Dornish peasant girl who caught the eye of the Prince. She assists Ellaria Sand in her plot to kill Myrcella Baratheon as revenge against Cersei Lannister, whose actions led to Oberyn's death. Though she is briefly imprisoned by her uncle Doran for her treachery, Ellaria kills Myrcella, and Obara joins her in her coup by personally murdering Trystane Martell, her own cousin. She is later present when Ellaria meets with Olenna Tyrell to discuss an alliance with Daenerys Targaryen, where she is silenced by Olenna. In season 7, Obaara accompanies Ellaria, Yara and Theon Greyjoy, and her sisters on the journey to Sunspear from Dragonstone. After they are ambushed by Euron Greyjoy and his fleet, both Nymeria and Obara confront Euron while Tyene protects Ellaria. Ultimately, Euron proves to be a more skillful fighter and ultimately stabs her in the stomach with her own spear. She is impaled at the front of the ship with her spear, next to her hanging sister, Nymeria.
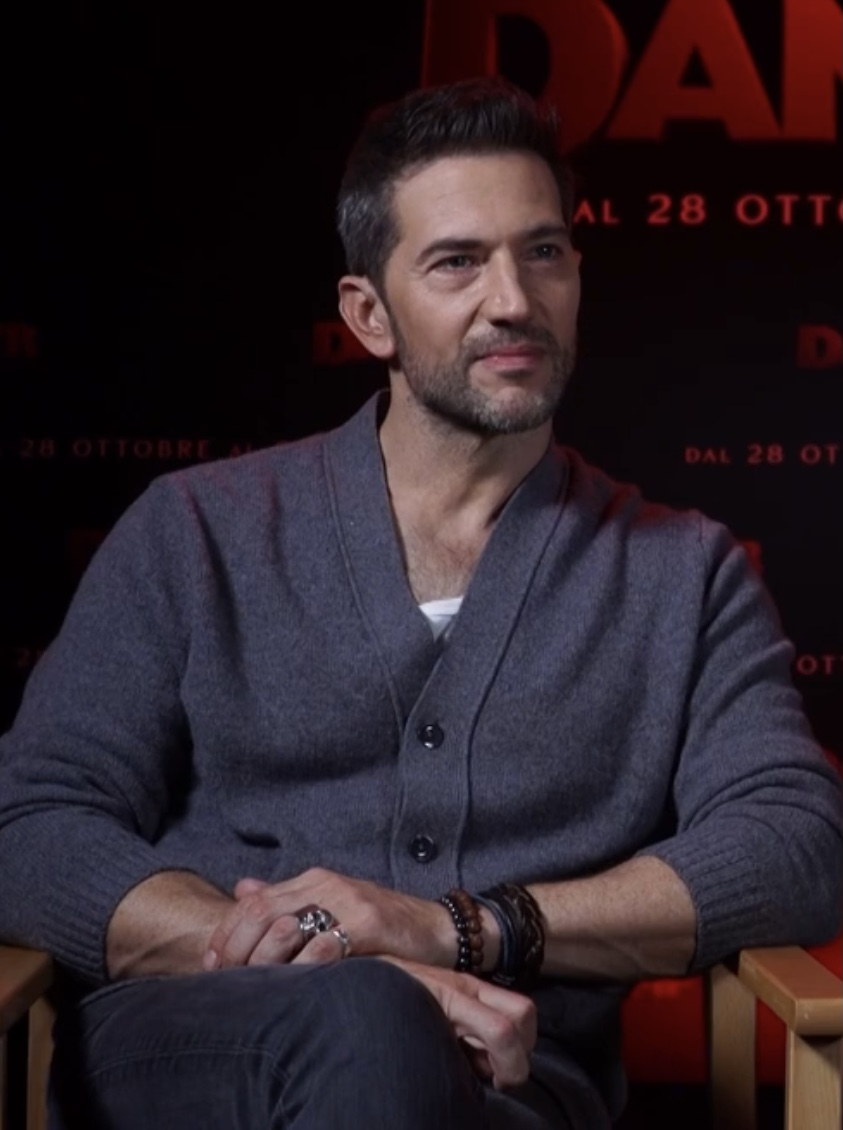
- Luke Roberts
  Arthur Dayne (portrayed by Luke Roberts) was a knight of King Aenys II Targaryen's Kingsguard, known as the "Sword of the Morning". He is a member of House Dayne of Starfall in Dorne. During one of his weirwood dreams, Bran witnesses the duel between Arthur and Eddard Stark at the Tower of Joy. Arthur is wounded by Howland Reed, allowing Eddard to win their duel.
- The Prince of Dorne (portrayed by Toby Osmund) was the ruler of Dorne, following the defeat of Ellaria Sand by Cersei Lannister and Euron Greyjoy. He pledges his support to Daenerys Targaryen before the Battle of King's Landing. After the assassination of Daenerys, the Prince is a member of the Great Council, and advocates for Bran Stark.

=== House Stark ===
- Rickon Stark (portrayed by Art Parkinson) is Lord Eddard and Lady Catelyn's youngest child, naturally aggressive and strong-willed. His black dire wolf Shaggydog shares these qualities also. When Theon Greyjoy captures Winterfell in season 2, Rickon hides in the crypts. After Winterfell is sacked and burned, he, Bran, Hodor, the Wildling woman Osha and the direwolves travel through the North. In season 3 before they reach the Wall, Rickon, his direwolf and Osha split up from the rest of the group heading to Last Hearth, the seathouse of the Umbers. In season 6, Rickon and Osha are betrayed by the Umbers to the Boltons following Greatjon Umber's death, and become hostages of Ramsay Bolton. At the beginning of a grand showdown between the Boltons and the Northern rebels led by Jon Snow, Rickon is released by Ramsay and told to run towards Jon, unaware that it is merely a trap to lure Jon into the open. Just before he can reach Jon, Rickon is shot and killed by Ramsay. Following Ramsay's defeat, Jon orders Rickon's body buried in the Winterfell crypt.
- Maester Luwin (portrayed by Donald Sumpter)
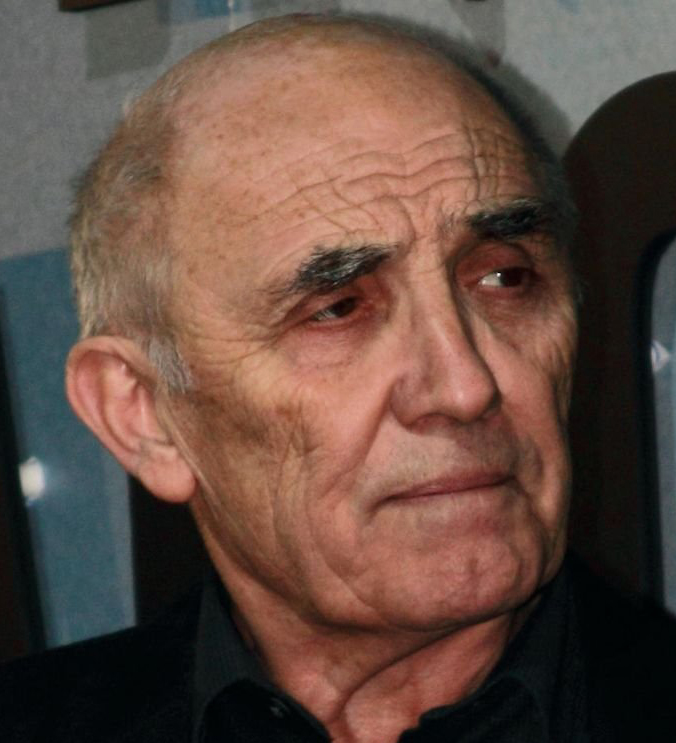
  Donald Sumpter
  is the Maester of Winterfell, and chief advisor to Lord Stark. He is one of the few Maesters to have studied magic and the occult. With Robb Stark's departure, the day-to-day rule of the North falls to Ser Rodrik Cassel and Maester Luwin, acting with Bran's voice. After Winterfell is taken by Theon, Luwin must advise him because of his valour to serve to the ruler of Winterfell. When Ramsay Snow launches an attack on Winterfell to drive the Ironborn away, Luwin advises Theon to flee to the Wall and join the Night's Watch, where his crimes will be pardoned, but Theon instead rallies his few remaining men to face Ramsay, and betrayed by his own men. Luwin, in an attempt to save Theon, is stabbed by Dagmer. Bran Stark and his party emerge from hiding to find Winterfell sacked by Ramsay and his men and Luwin dying in the Godswood, where he declares his loyalty and love for the Starks before having Osha perform a mercy killing on him, out of sight of Bran and Rickon.
- Rodrik Cassel (portrayed by Ron Donachie)
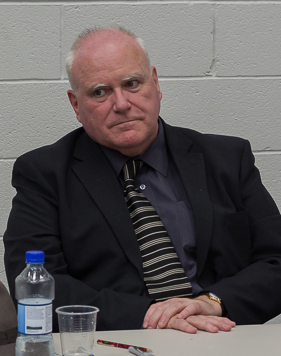
  Ron Donachie
  is the Master-at-Arms at Winterfell. After the discovery of the origin of the knife from the attempted assassination of Bran Stark, he accompanies Lady Catelyn Tully to King's Landing. Later Lady Catelyn decides to join Robb at Moat Cailin, and names Ser Rodrik castellan of Winterfell. When the Ironmen attack Torrhen's Square, Ser Rodrik gathers a force to expel them, including most of the Winterfell garrison. The Ironborn under Theon Greyjoy then attack and take Winterfell, and Ser Rodrik is captured while defending himself. Ser Rodrik refuses to swear allegiance to Theon, and spits in his face. Theon orders him thrown into the dungeons, but Dagmer insists that Theon execute him to gain respect. Theon executes Ser Rodrik himself, but it takes several blows of the sword to behead him and only gains more contempt and hatred from the Northerners.
- Jory Cassel (portrayed by Jamie Sives) was Captain of the Guard at Winterfell and the nephew of Ser Rodrik. Killed by Jaime Lannister during a fight between Jaime's men and Eddard Stark over Tyrion Lannister's abduction by Eddard's wife.
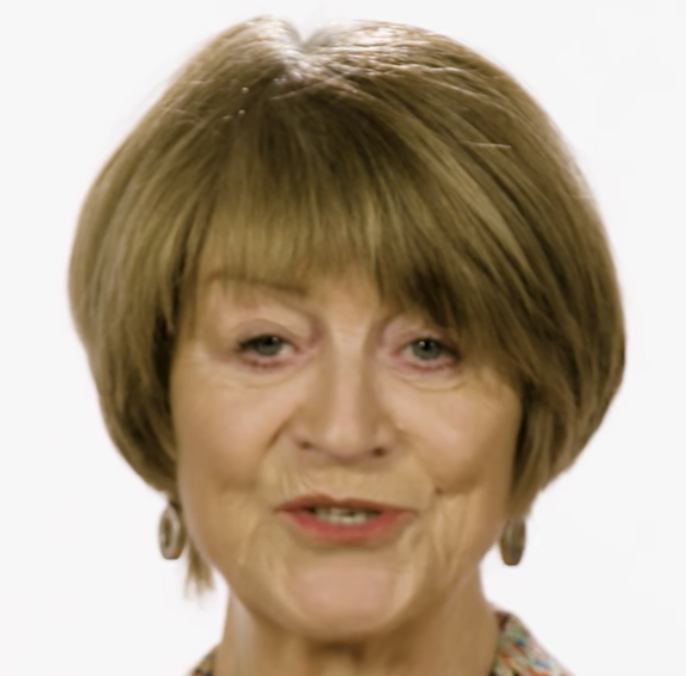
- Susan Brown
  Septa Mordane (portrayed by Susan Brown) was a priestess of the Faith of the Seven Gods and governess to the young ladies of Winterfell. She was killed by the Lannisters after Eddard Stark's failed attempt to arrest King Joffrey and Queen Regent Cersei.
- Hodor (portrayed by Kristian Nairn)
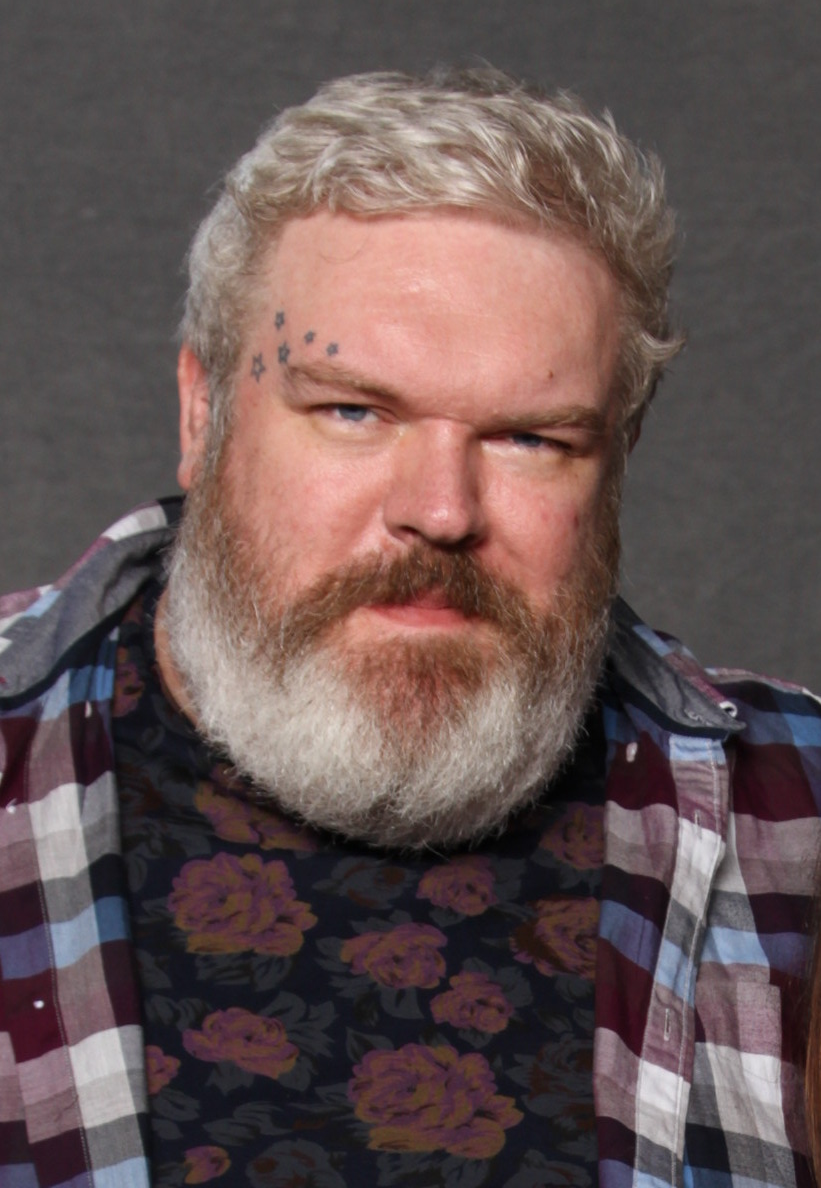
  Kristian Nairn
  is a huge, physically strong and intellectually disabled stablehand at Winterfell who can only say the word "Hodor". He hides in the crypts along with Osha, Bran and Rickon, faking their escape out of the castle. They eventually leave the crypts only to find the castle destroyed. After speaking to the dying Maester Luwin, it is decided that they must go to the Wall. In season 3 Bran decides to go beyond the Wall to find the Three-Eyed Raven and Hodor helps him along with Meera and Jojen Reed after the departure of Rickon and Osha. In season 4, they stumble across Craster's Keep, where they are captured by the Night's Watch mutineers led by Karl. Hodor is chained to a post and abused by some mutineers, who poke him with spears and eventually stab him in the leg to stop him intervening on Bran's behalf. Hodor is later chained in a hut with the other prisoners, and when Bran is abducted by Locke, Bran wargs into Hodor and uses him to kill Locke by snapping his neck. Hodor frees the others and they escape, eventually reaching the Three-Eyed Raven in his cave. During Season 6, Bran learns through visions of the past that, as a boy, Hodor was named Wyllis and possessed normal abilities of speech. When the cave is overrun by White Walkers and wights while Bran is viewing the past, Bran simultaneously wargs into Hodor to induce him to carry Bran to safety. Once they exit through a passageway, Meera orders Hodor to "hold the door" against the wights; in the past, Wyllis collapses and repeats this phrase until it slurs into "Hodor". In the present, Hodor is killed as the wights eventually tear through the door, but Meera escapes with Bran. Hodor only ever says one word: "Hodor". However, according to Kristian Nairn's interview to Vulture, he has developed 70 ways to say it.
- Old Nan (portrayed by Margaret John) was an old serving woman at Winterfell who tells the Stark children stories from beyond the Wall. She is the great-grandmother of Hodor. Margaret John died before the filming of Season 2, so her character was killed offscreen in between seasons rather than being recast.
- Jon Umber (portrayed by Clive Mantle)
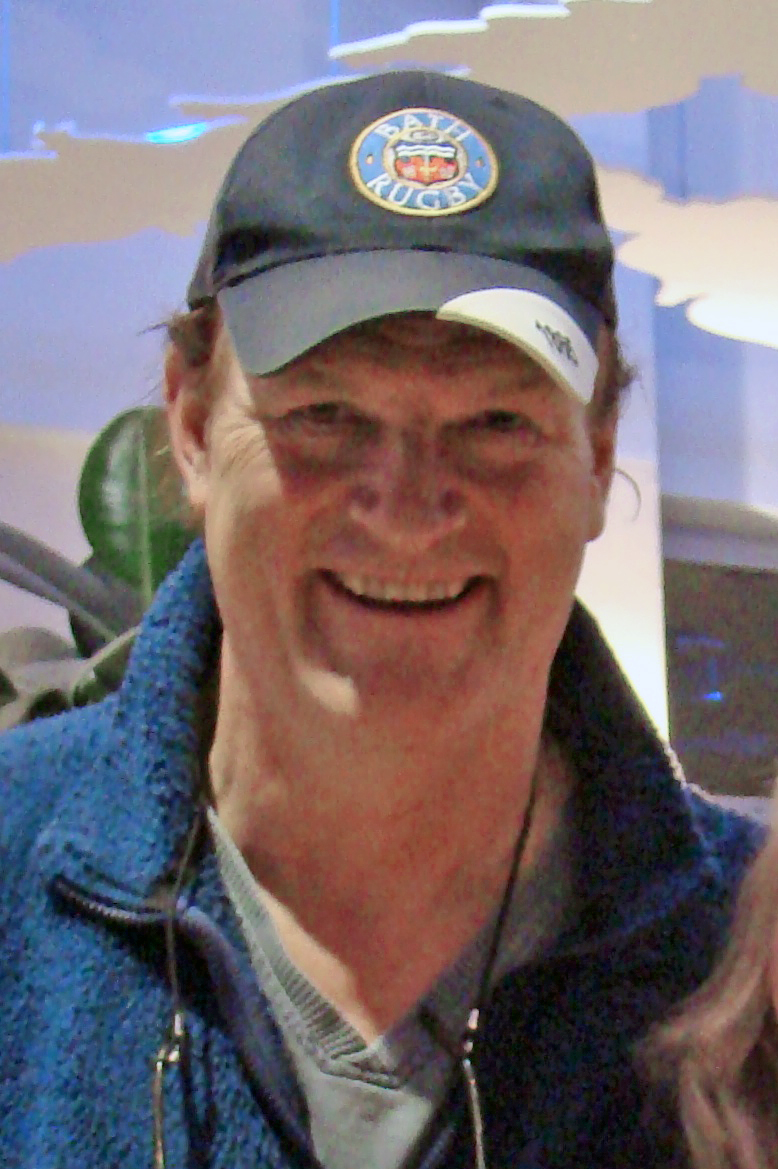
  Clive Mantle
  is the Lord of Last Hearth and a Bannerman of the North. In season 1 he joins Robb Stark in the war and is the first one calling him The King in the North. In season 3, the North loses the war after the death of King Robb, but his youngest brother Rickon heads to the seat of House Umber to seek refuge. In between the third and sixth seasons, Rickon and Osha arrive at Last Hearth, but at some point, Greatjon dies under unknown circumstances and his lands pass to his son, Smalljon Umber, who betrays Rickon and Osha to Ramsay Snow.
- Osha (portrayed by Natalia Tena)
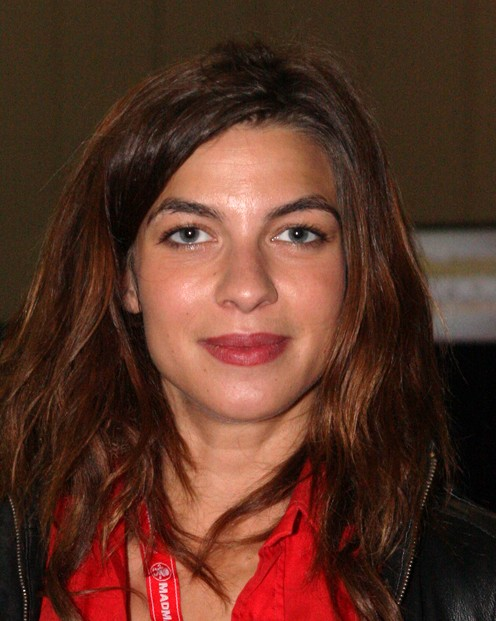
  Natalia Tena
  is a Wildling woman captured by Robb and held captive at Winterfell. Osha works in the kitchens, often giving Bran advice when she bathes in the godswood. After Winterfell is taken by the turncloak Theon Greyjoy, Osha bends the knee to Theon. After the Sack of Winterfell, Osha helps Bran and Rickon escape, along with their direwolves and Hodor. She gives a mercy kill to wounded Maester Luwin. Later, she and her companions travel to the Wall to seek help. In season 3 before they reach the Wall, Osha, Rickon and his direwolf split up from the rest of the group heading to Last Hearth, the seathouse of the Umbers. In season 6, they are betrayed by the Umbers to the Boltons after Greatjon Umber dies, and become hostages of Ramsay Bolton. Osha later attempts to kill Ramsay, but is instead killed herself.
- Maege Mormont (portrayed by Elizabeth Barrett) was the Head of House Mormont of Bear Island, and mother to Lady Lyanna Mormont. She, alongside other Northern Lords is summoned by Robb Stark to march south, and later declares Robb Stark, King in the North.
- Vayon Poole (portrayed by Matthew Scurfield) is the Stewart of Winterfell, and the father of Jeyne Poole, a companion of Lady Sansa Stark. Vayon travels south with Lord Eddard Stark, and later, alongside other members of the household, is killed by Lannister men when Lord Eddard is arrested.
- Torrhen Karstark (portrayed by Tyrone McElhennon) is the son of Rickard Karstark, the Lord of Karhold. During the War of the Five Kings, Torrhen stands as guard to a captured Jamie and Alton Lannister. Torrhen is strangled to death by Jamie, by his chains, whilst investigating Alton's death, allowing Jamie to escape.
- Rickard Karstark (portrayed by Steven Blount in season 1, and by John Stahl from season 2 onwards) is a Bannerman of the North, Lord of Karhold and he is a chief member of Robb Stark's war council. The Karstarks are distant cousins of the Starks of Winterfell. Karstark's sons Harrion and Torrhen was killed by Jaime Lannister and Karstark vows retribution. He is enraged when Catelyn Stark decides to free Jaime in an attempt to secure the safety of her daughters. When Karstark discovers that Edmure Tully has defeated the Lannisters in battle near Riverrun and taken two of his young relatives hostage, Karstark orders his men to kill them. Karstark is subsequently sentenced to death by Robb, and he cryptically warns Robb that his actions will eventually lead to his own demise, just before he is executed.
- Jacks (portrayed by Paul Caddell) is a guardsman in service to House Strak. During the War of the Five King, Jacks informs Lady Catelyn Stark of Jamie Lannister's recapture, crossing words with Brienne in Tarth by doing so.
- Farlen (portrayed by Peter Ballance) is the kennelmaster of Winterfell. When Theon Greyjoy seizes Winterfell, he refuses to submit, despite Bran Stark's protests, and is beaten for it.
- Jojen Reed (portrayed by Thomas Brodie-Sangster)
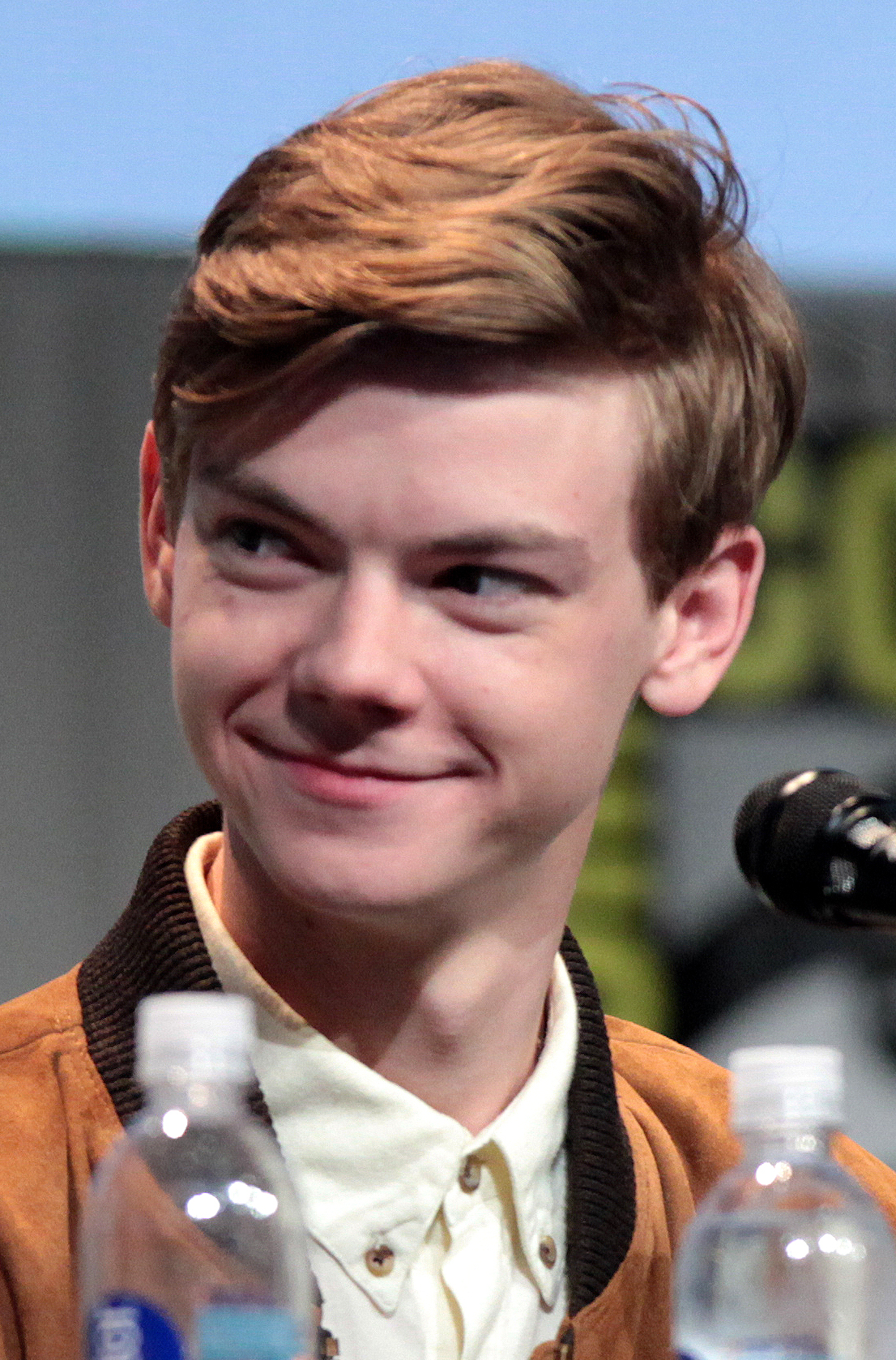
  Thomas Sangster
  is a boy with special insights and son of Lord Howland Reed, Eddard Stark's old friend from Robert's Rebellion. In season 3 Jojen and his sister join Bran in his journey to the Wall and beyond to help him to find the Three-Eyed Raven. In season 4, they stumble across Craster's Keep and are captured by the Night's Watch mutineers led by Karl, during which time Jojen suffers from a seizure. Jojen and the others are freed when Bran wargs into Hodor and has him kill Locke and cut them all loose, but Jojen stops Bran from reuniting with his brother, Jon Snow, since he knows Jon would try and stop their journey. Once they reach their destination, however, they are attacked by reanimated skeletons, and Jojen is stabbed in the ensuing fight. Meera finishes him out of mercy.
- Meera Reed (portrayed by Ellie Kendrick)
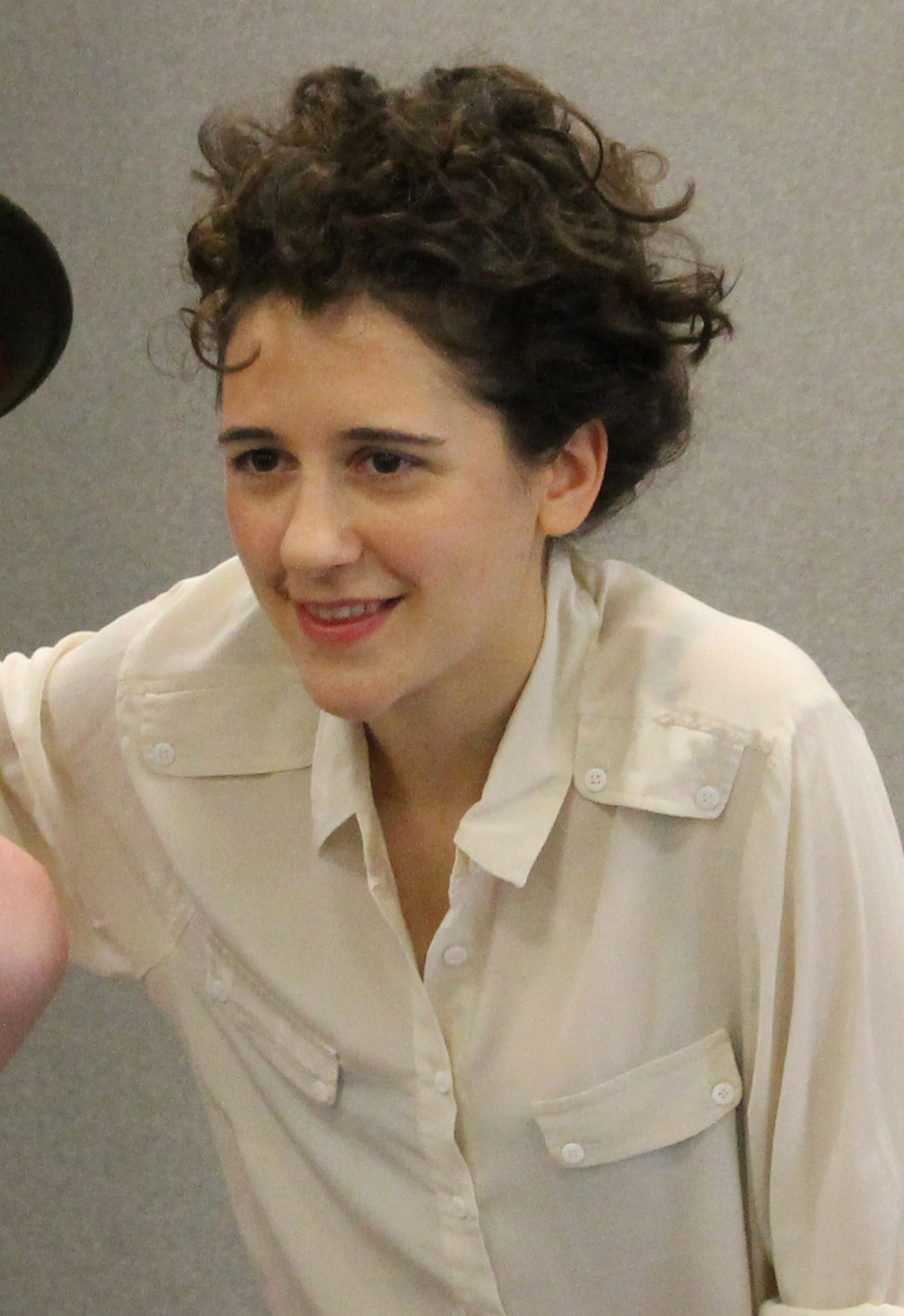
  Ellie Kendrick
  is Jojen Reed's elder sister and daughter of Lord Howland Reed, Eddard Stark's old friend from Robert's Rebellion. In season 3 Meera and her brother join Bran in his journey to the Wall and beyond to help him to find the Three-Eyed Raven. In season 4, they stumble across Craster's Keep and are captured by the Night's Watch mutineers led by Karl. Meera is almost raped by Karl, but is saved when Bran reveals his identity to protect her. Karl later tries again to rape her, but an attack by Night's Watch rangers saves her, and they manage to escape during the fray. They eventually reach the Three-Eyed Raven in a cave, but are attacked by reanimated skeletons outside it. Jojen is fatally stabbed, and Meera performs a mercy killing on him. In season 6, she continues to mourn for Jojen. After the cave is attacked by White Walkers, she pulls Bran to safety until the wights catch up. They are rescued by Bran's uncle, Benjen Stark, who ultimately takes them back to the Wall. When she leaves Bran to go back south to her home, she is devastated that he gives no acknowledgement of her sacrifices or her brother's.
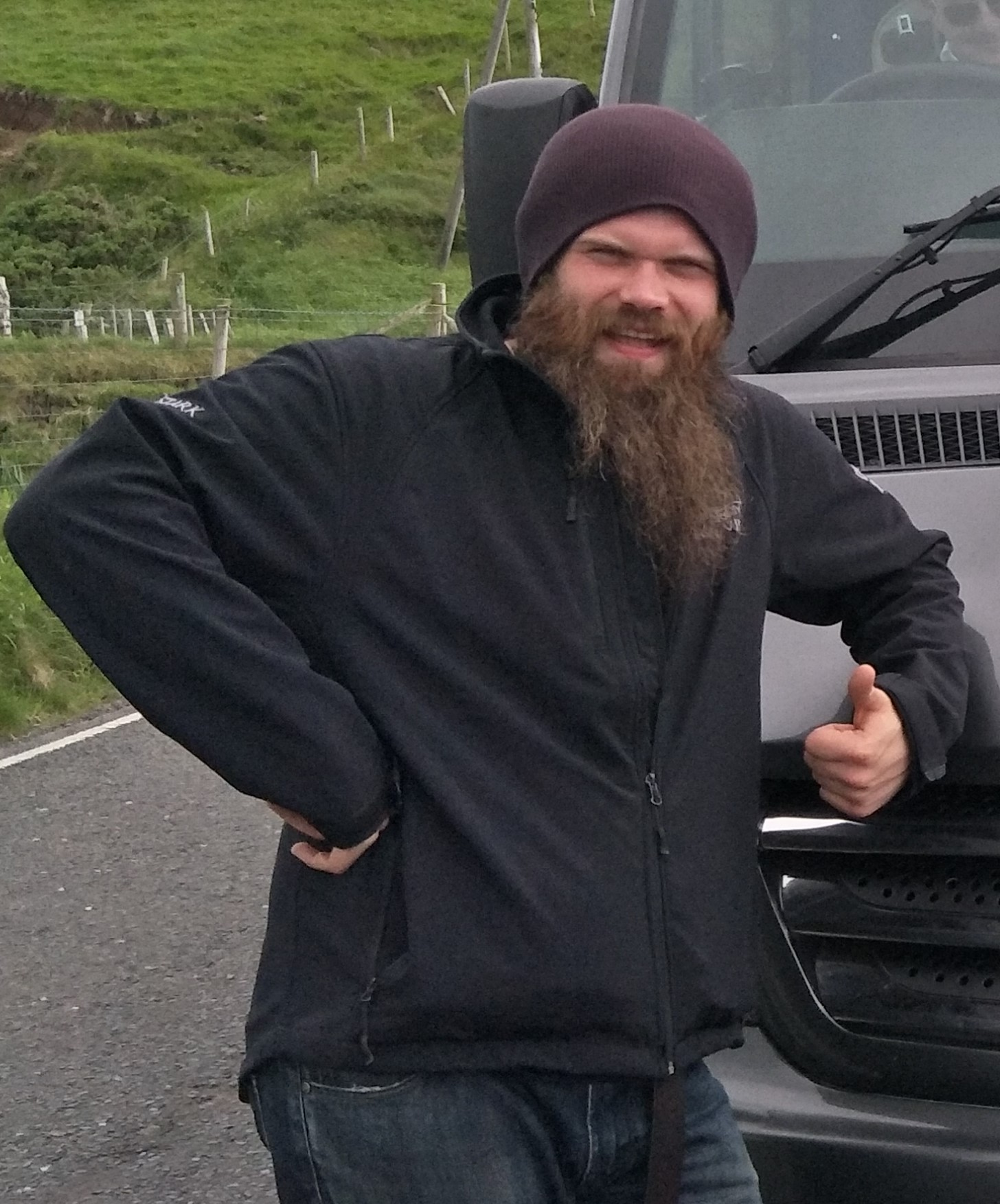
- Andrew McClay
  Aberdolf Strongbeard (portrayed by Andrew McClay) was a soldier in service to House Baratheon and then House Stark. Aberdolf witnessed the burning of Shireen and was able to escape the Battle of the Ice. Aberdolf later participated in the Battle of the Basterds, and hails Jon Snow, the King in the North. In preparation for the White Walker attack, Aberdolf serves as a guard, and fights in the Battle of Winterfell, and later the Battle of King's Landing. Aberdolf prepares to fight the Unsullied when Grey Worm executed defeated Lannister soldiers. Aberdolf then returns to Winterfll, and stands vigil during the coronation of Sansa Stark as Queen in the North.
- Maester Wolkan (portrayed by Richard Rycroft)
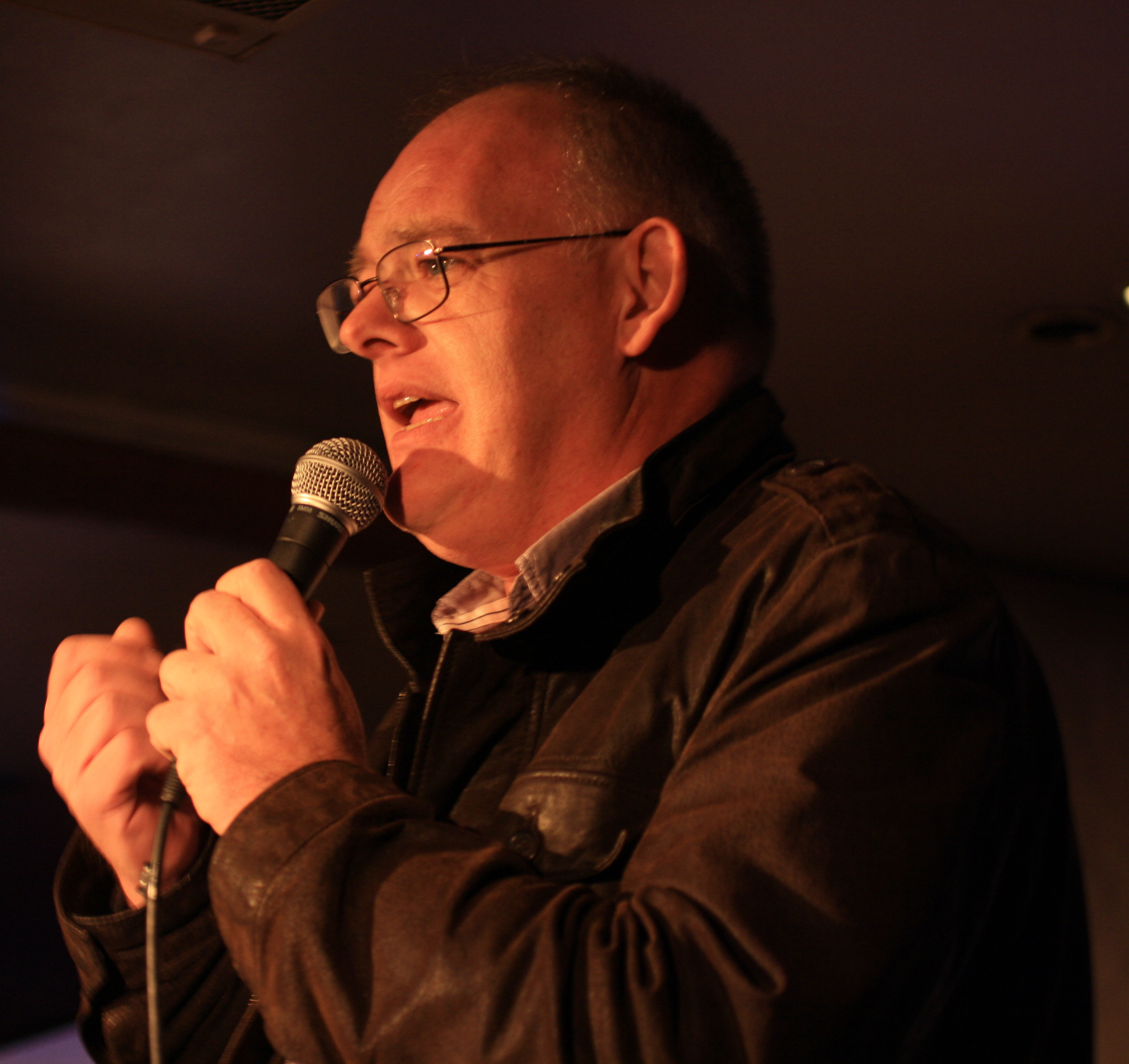
  Richard Rycroft
  is a member of the Order of Masters who is in service to House Bolton at Winterfell. He witnesses Ramsay kill Roose and reluctantly summons Walda and the baby for Ramsay to murder as well. After the Boltons' defeat, he serves the Starks. He unwillingly helps Petyr Baelish cause friction between Sansa and Arya Stark. He builds a wheelchair for Bran.
- Lyanna Stark (portrayed by Cordelia Hill as a child, and by Aisling Franciosi as an adult)
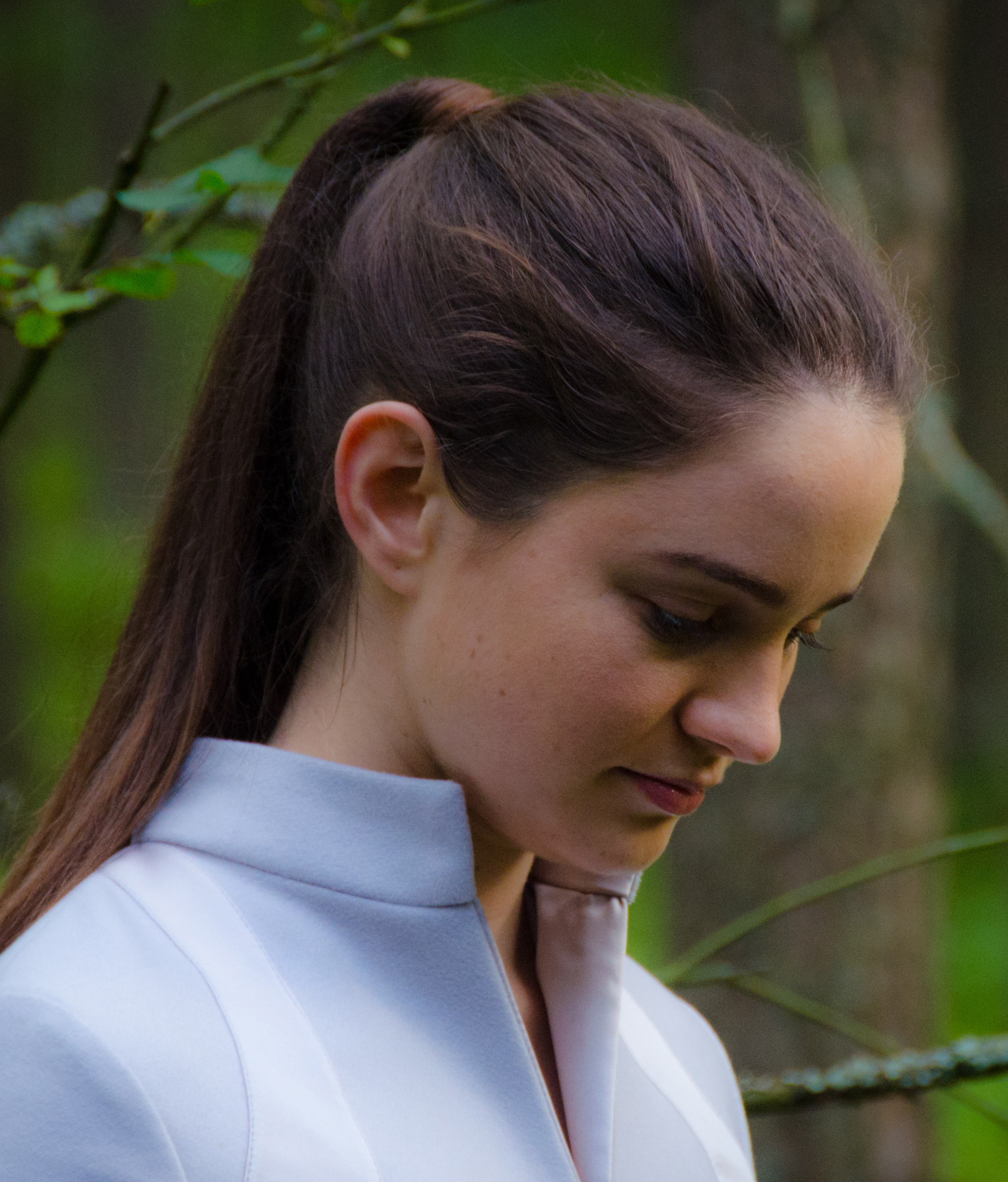
  Aisling Franciosi
  is the sister of Ned Stark, who was promised to wed Robert Baratheon, but was supposedly kidnapped and raped by Rhaegar Targaryen. During the tourney at Harrenhal, Rhaegar rode past his wife, Elia Martell, and placed a crown of winter roses in Lyanna's lap. Lyanna in fact loved Rhaegar, and was married to him in secret. At the Tower of Joy, Lyanna is being protected by several members of the Kingsguard when Ned arrives to try to find her. Defeating Ser Arthur Dayne of the Kingsguard, Ned enters the Tower of Joy where he finds Lyanna in a bed of blood, but still alive. Lyanna asks Ned to promise to protect her son, who is revealed to be Jon Snow, and prevent Robert from killing him by hiding his Targaryen lineage.
- Howland Reed (portrayed by Leo Woodruff) is the Lord of Greywater Watch, and father of Meera and Jojen Reed. During one of his weirwood dreams, Bran witnesses the duel between Arthur Dayne and Eddard Stark at the Tower of Joy. Arthur is wounded by Howland Reed, allowing Eddard to win their duel.
- Lyanna Mormont (portrayed by Bella Ramsey)
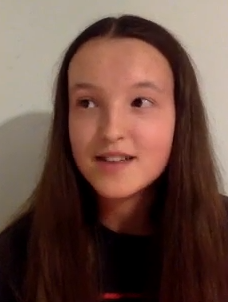
  Bella Ramsey
  is the fierce and outspoken, 10-year-old head of House Mormont of Bear Island. She is the niece of Lord Commander Jeor Mormont of the Night's Watch and cousin of Ser Jorah Mormont. In the fifth season, she refuses Stannis Baratheon's request to aid him in his campaign to overthrow the Boltons and rally the North to help him retake the Iron Throne, asserting her loyalty to House Stark. In the sixth season, she is approached by Jon Snow, Sansa Stark and Davos Seaworth for help in retaking Winterfell from Ramsay Bolton. Though Lyanna is ready to refuse, citing Jon as a bastard and Sansa as a Lannister/Bolton wife, she is persuaded to offer help when Davos informs her of the coming battle against the Night King. She accompanies the Mormont forces and witnesses the subsequent battle between Jon and Ramsay's armies. After the castle is retaken, Lyanna admonishes Wyman Manderly and Robett Glover for refusing Jon's calls for help, and is the first to proclaim Jon the new King in the North. As Jon and the Northern Lords plan for the coming war she insists that girls as well as boys should be taught military skills. She dies heroically in the Battle of Winterfell, sacrificing herself to singlehandedly slay an undead ice giant.
- Robett Glover (portrayed by Tim McInnerny)
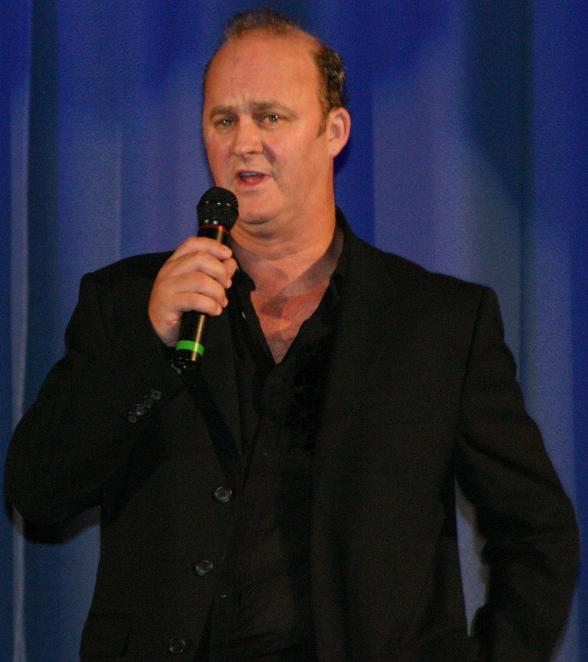
  Tim McInnerny
  is the brother of Galbart Glover, the Master of Deepwood Motte. He succeeded him after Galbart's death in the War of the Five Kings. House Glover were bannermen of House Stark but this changed after the Boltons helped him take Deepwood Motte back from the Ironborn who had captured it. He refuses Jon and Sansa's request for aid against the Boltons, citing his brother's death fighting for Robb, the fact that Robb marching to war in the south provided an opportunity for the Ironborn to capture his castle, in the process killing his subjects and imprisoning his family, and finally the fact that Jon's army is composed primarily of Wildings, who the Northern houses have been fighting for generations. However, after Jon Snow and Sansa Stark successfully recapture Winterfell from the Boltons, with help from Littlefinger and the Knights of the Vale, House Glover becomes sworn to House Stark once more, with Lord Glover apologizing for his previous refusal of aid and crowning Jon the King in the North. Despite this, when Jon Snow swears fealty to Daenerys Targaryen, Lord Glover and his men return to Deepwood Motte and do not aid House Stark during the Battle of Winterfell.
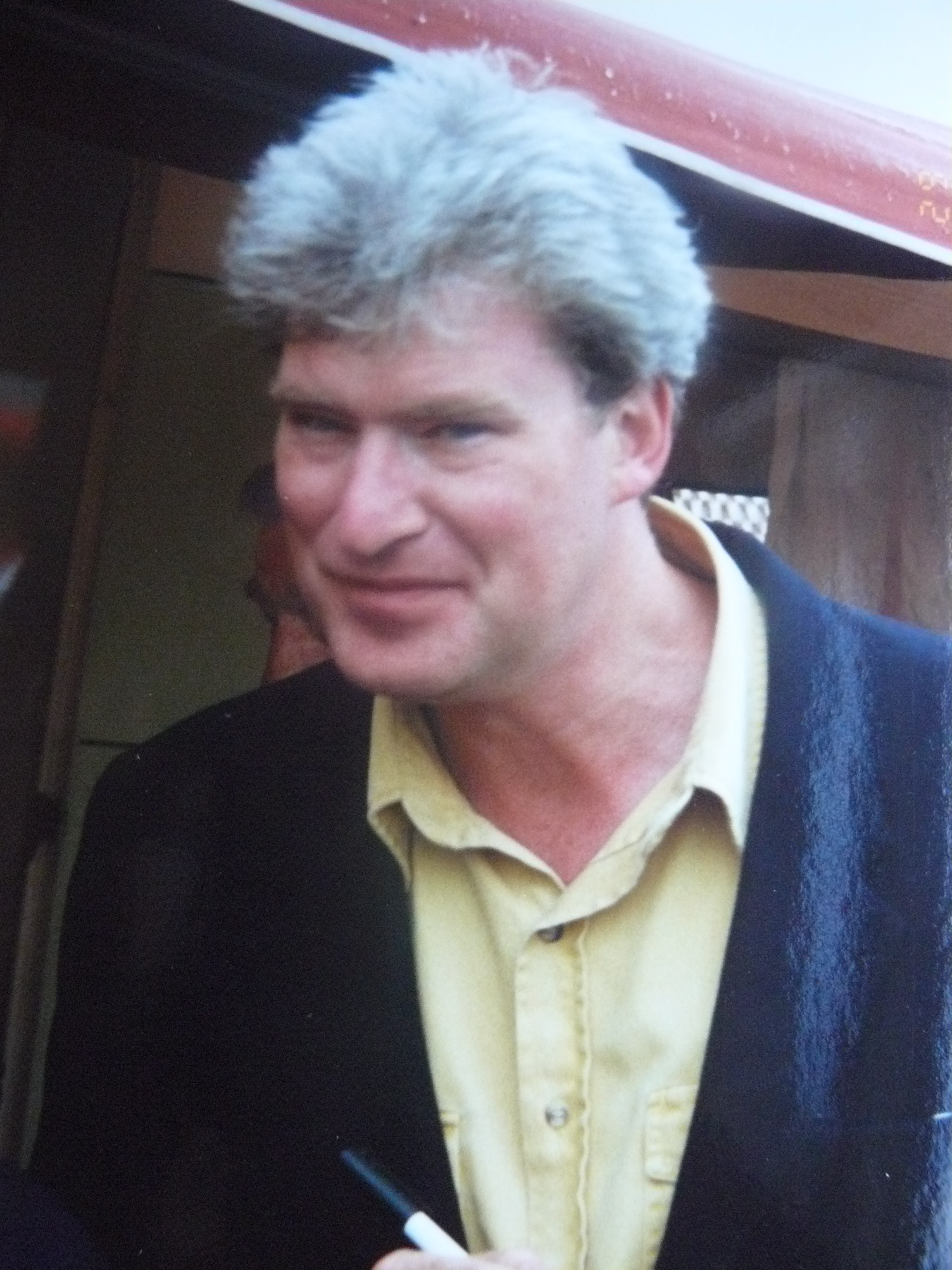
- Sean Blowers
  Wyman Manderly (portrayed by Sean Blowers) is the Lord of White Harbor, and the Head of House Manderly. He refuses to take part on either side of the Battle of the Bastards. After Jon Snow takes Winterfell, Wyman arrives to treat with him, and is berated by Lyanna Mormont for not upholding their oaths of allegiance to House Stark despite the crimes committed against them at the Red Wedding. Wyman is the first lord to declare Jon the King in the North and the first to call him the "White Wolf".
- Cley Cerwyn (portrayed by Tom Varey) is the Lord of Castle Cerwyn, and the Head of House Cerwyn, after his father is flayed alive by Ramsey Bolton following the Red Wedding. After the Battle of the Bastards, where Jon Snow takes Winterfell, Cley notes that a new winter is expected, and is one of the lords berated by Lyanna Mormont for not aiding Jon against the Boltons, despite Ramsay having flayed his family alive. Lord Cerwyn declares Jon as the King in the North along with the other Northern Lords.
- Ned Umber (portrayed by Harry Grasby) is the Lord of the Last Hearth, and the son of Lord Smalljon Umber. Following his father's death at the Battle of the Bastards, Ned swears fealty to House Stark, alongside Alys Karstark, reaffirming their loyalty after their families crimes against them. In season 8, Ned is found dead at the Last Hearth by Tormund Giantsbane, Beric Dondarrion, and Eddison Tollett, when he is reanimated as a wight, he is burned by Beric.
- Alys Karstark (portrayed by Megan Parkinson) is the daughter of Lord Harold Karstark, and the Head of House Karstark, following her father's death at the Battle of the Bastards, Ned swears fealty to House Stark, alongside Ned Umber, reaffirming their loyalty after their families crimes against them. In season 8, Alys participates in the Battle of Winterfell, defending Bran Stark, where she is killed off-screen.
- Fergus (portrayed by Seamus O'Hara) was a commoner who participated in the Battle of Winterfell. Before the battle, he is encouraged and reassured by Davos Seaworth, talking about his own survival at the Battle of the Basterds. He is killed by the Army of the Dead.
- Teela (portrayed by Bea Glancy) was a young girl who lived in Winterfell. Teela expressed her desire to fight in the Battle of Winterfell to Davos Seaworth, reminding him of the late Shireen Baratheon. Teela is convinced to go down into the crypts by Gilly, in order to defend them, and remains down there during the Battle of Winterfell.

=== House Targaryen ===
- Illyrio Mopatis (portrayed by Roger Allam)
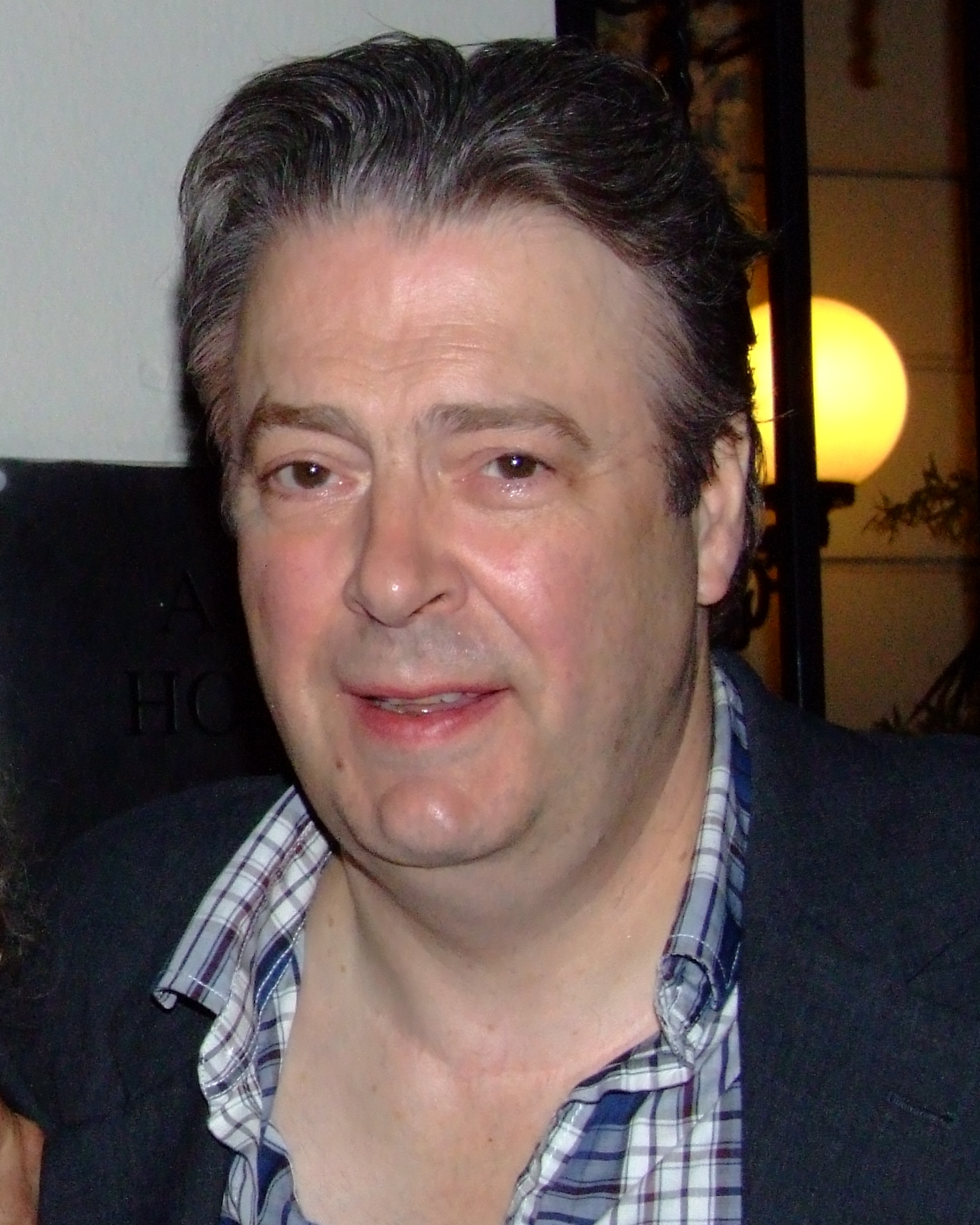
  Roger Allam
  is a wealthy magister of the free city of Pentos. Illiyrio hosts the Targaryens after their escape from Westeros. He arranges Daenerys's marriage to Khal Drogo and conspires with Lord Varys for the return of the Targaryens to power. In season 5, Varys and Tyrion Lannister take shelter in his mansion when they flee Westeros after the murder of Tywin Lannister.
- Doreah (portrayed by Roxanne McKee)
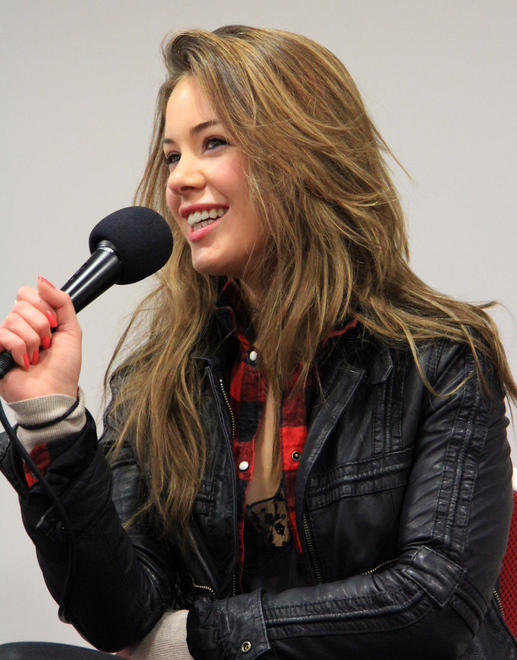
  Roxanne McKee
  is a slave bought to school Daenerys in the art of love. She was sold to a brothel when she was nine, by her mother. She is bought by Viserys Targaryen and is shown to pleasure him as he tells her stories about the dragons of Westeros. In season 2 after arriving in Qarth, Doreah is convinced by Xaro Xoan Daxos that Daenerys would not leave the city and she steals Daenerys dragons and becomes Xaro's lover. After revealing the plans of Xaro, Daenerys locks him and Doreah alive in a vault.
- Irri (portrayed by Amrita Acharya) is a slave bought to school Daenerys in Dothraki riding. She is in love with Rakharo and is deeply distressed by his death and the desecration of his corpse. She and Doreah are shown to be at odds, due to Irri valuing tradition and mythical beliefs of the Dothraki over Doreah's foreign ideals. In season 2 she is killed in Qarth during the stealing of the dragons. In a deleted scene it is shown she is strangled to death by Doreah.
- Rakharo (portrayed by Elyes Gabel)
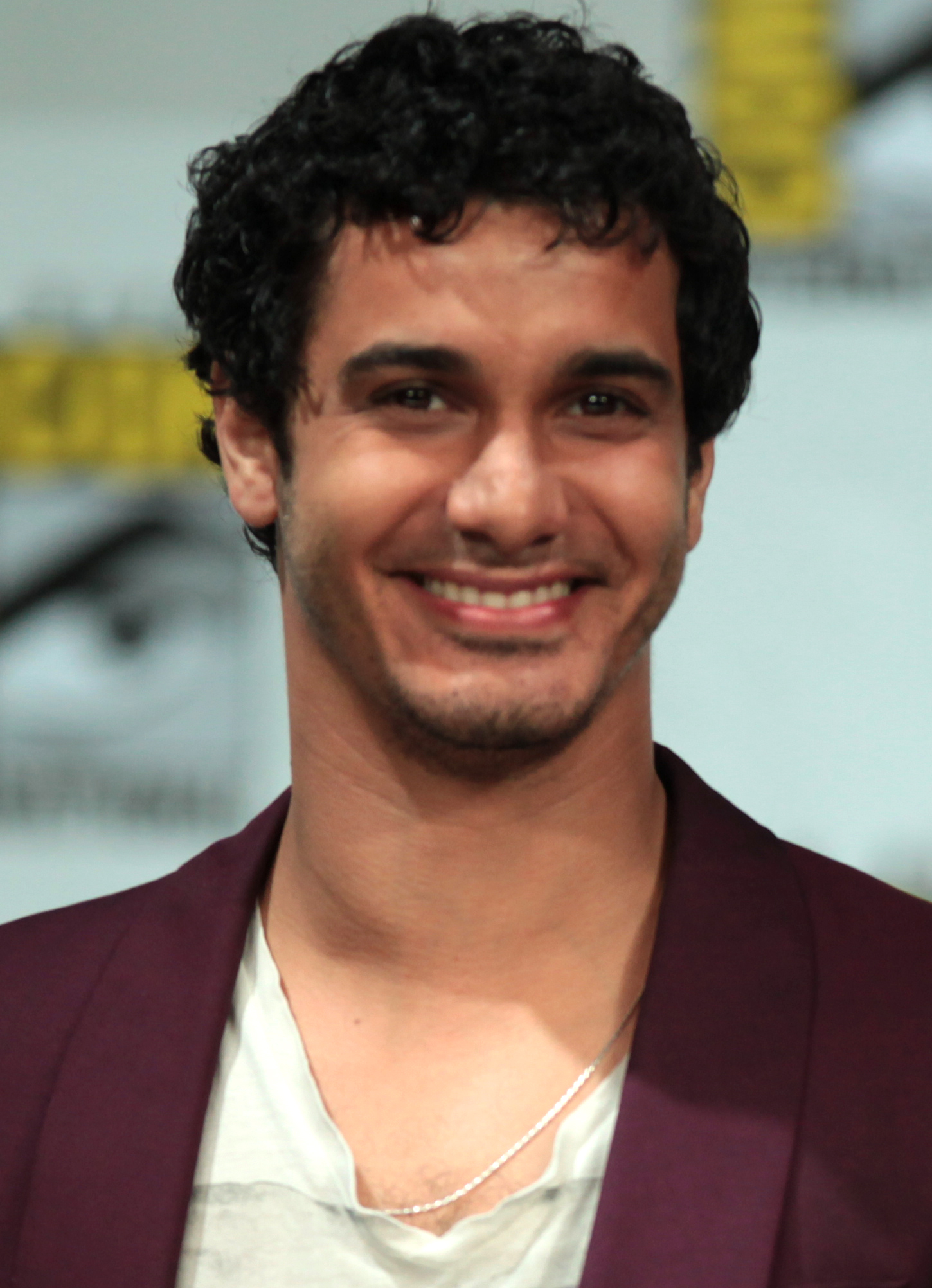
  Elyes Gabel
  A young Bloodrider favored by and sworn to Khal Drogo and later Daenerys Targaryen. Deep into the Red Waste while facing starvation Daenerys sends Rakharo, Aggo, and Kovarro to scout in three different directions, using the last remaining horses. Later Rakharo's horse comes back with his head. It is assumed that Rakharo is killed by some other Khal. Irri fears that without his head, Rakharo's soul will become lost and will not find its way to the Night Lands.
- Barristan Selmy (portrayed by Ian McElhinney)
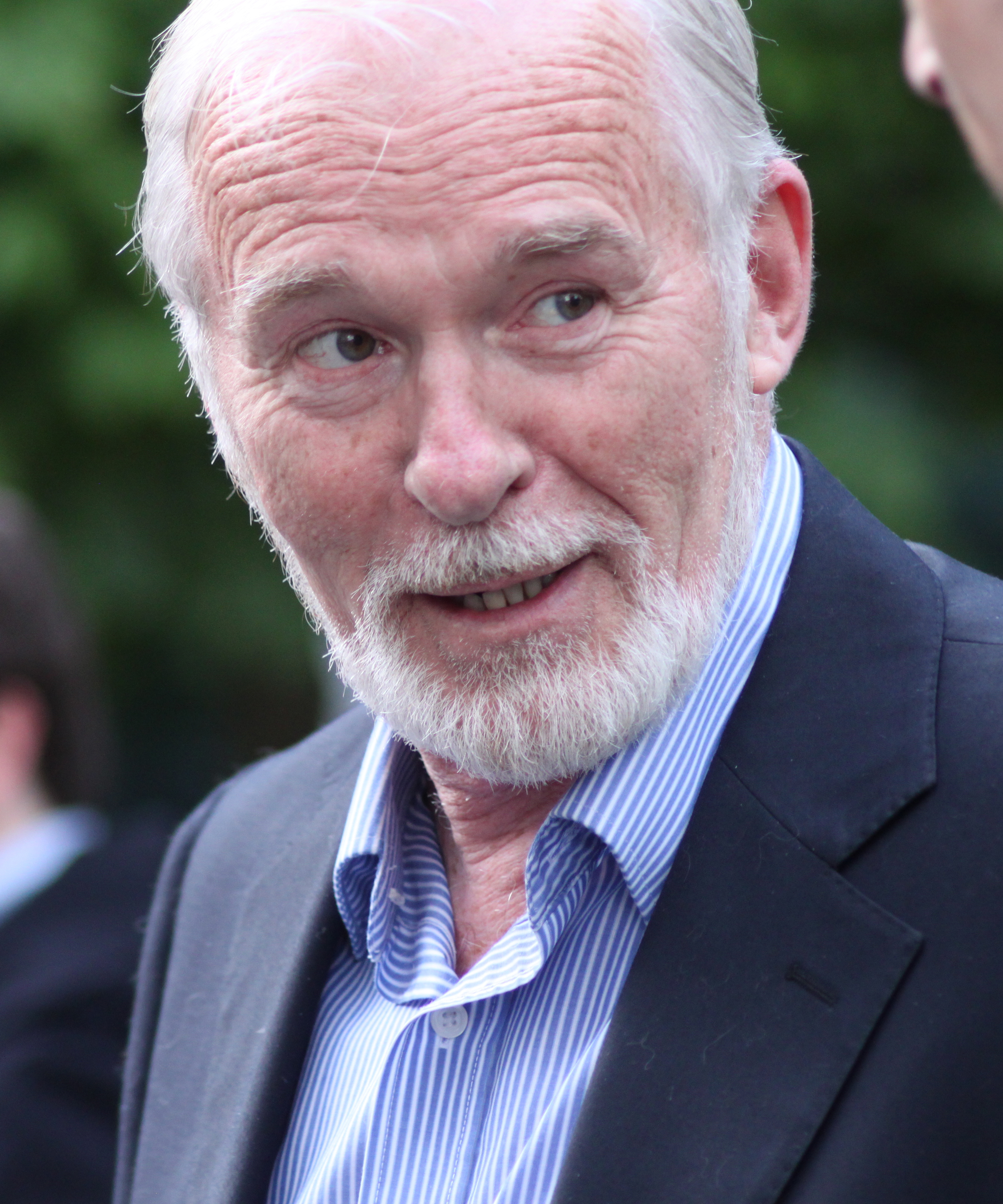
  Ian McElhinney
  is the Lord Commander of the Kingsguard and member of the Small Council. Known as "Barristan the Bold", he is considered one of the most famous knights of the Seven Kingdoms. He is a member of House Selmy of Harvest Hill in the Stormlands. Ned has a tremendous respect for Barristan as he remained loyal to protect the Mad King, Aerys II. He sustained injuries at the Trident which prevented Selmy from taking place in the final battles of the war which ultimately led to his survival and pardon. When Ned attempts to arrest Cersei and Joffrey, he informs Ser Barristan of Robert's will and tells his men not to harm him. After Joffrey becomes King and has Ned arrested, Cersei and Joffrey force Ser Barristan into retirement despite the Kingsguard being meant to serve for life, and much to his anger, his position of Commander is to be given to Jaime. His honor insulted, Ser Barristan refuses their offer of a castle and servants in recognition of his service and leaves King's Landing. Ser Barristan returns in season 3 where he offers his service to Daenerys as a member of her Queensguard to redeem himself for failing her family. He and Ser Jorah Mormont tend to conflict over what actions Daenerys should use with the former preferring honorable choices while the latter preferring pragmatic choices. Barristan later discovers that Jorah's original purpose was to spy on Daenerys for Robert and Lord Varys, and informs Daenerys, fearing for her safety and leading her to exile Jorah from Meereen on threat of execution. When a resistance movement, the Sons of the Harpy, openly hostile to Daenerys's conquest and politics, arise, Barristan advises the Queen to remain just with her enemies and tells of her own father's crimes and cruel attitude which led to his downfall. He eventually sustains mortal injuries in a fight with a group of Sons of the Harpy alongside Grey Worm even though he managed to slay most of them with prowess. He is mourned by Daenerys as she considered him a loyal friend and his death causes her to retaliate on the Great Masters.
- Kovarro (portrayed by Steven Cole) is a Dothraki Bloodrider sworn to Daenerys Targaryen. He finds Qarth and leads Daenerys there, following the betrayal of Pyat Pree he goes into hiding alongside Jorah Mormont and Daenerys until Daenerys reclaims her dragons. The only thing that interests him in Qarth is stealing all the gold and jewels from Xaro Xoan Daxos.
- Hizdahr zo Loraq (portrayed by Joel Fry)
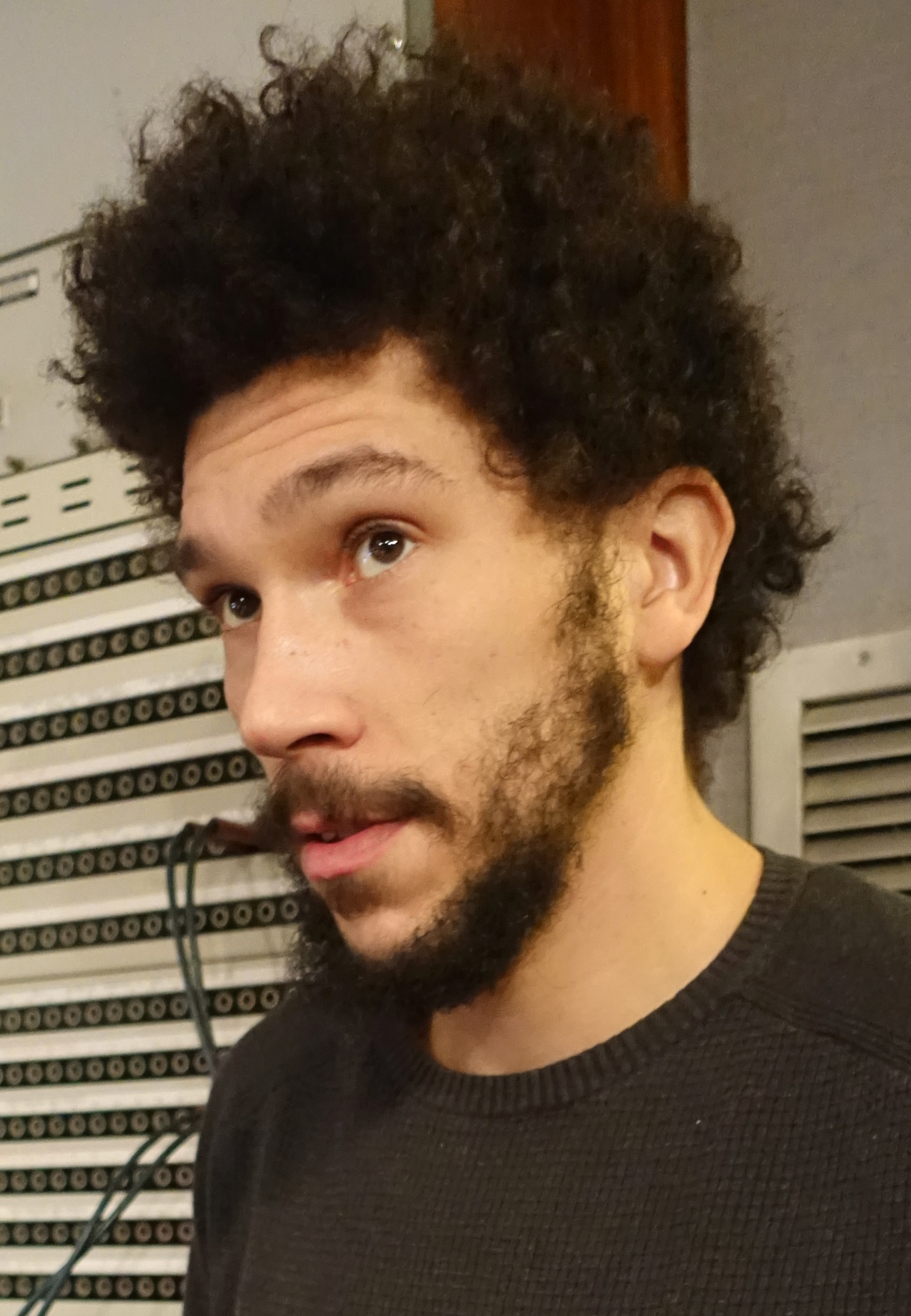
  Joel Fry
  is a slave-trader from the city of Meereen, on the coast of Slaver's Bay, and a scion of the House of Loraq, an ancient and proud line of slavers. He claims to Daenerys Targaryen that his father, who Daenerys ordered crucified, was actually against the crucifixion of children, and requests permission to give his father a proper funeral, which she accepts. Daenerys later has Hizdahr sent to Yunkai along with Daario Naharis as her ambassador to persuade the wise masters there to submit to her rule. In season 5, he returns with Daario claiming to have succeeded, although the masters want Daenerys to reopen the fighting pits in return, which she refuses, though she grants him a position on her Small Council. After Barristan Selmy is killed and Grey Worm seriously injured in an attack by the Sons of the Harpy, Daenerys agrees to reopen the pits and marry Hizdahr to bring about peace, though Daario insinuates that Hizdahr is working with the Sons of the Harpy. On the opening day of the Great Games, however, the Sons of the Harpy attack again and Hizdahr is killed, revealing that he was loyal to Daenerys the entire time.
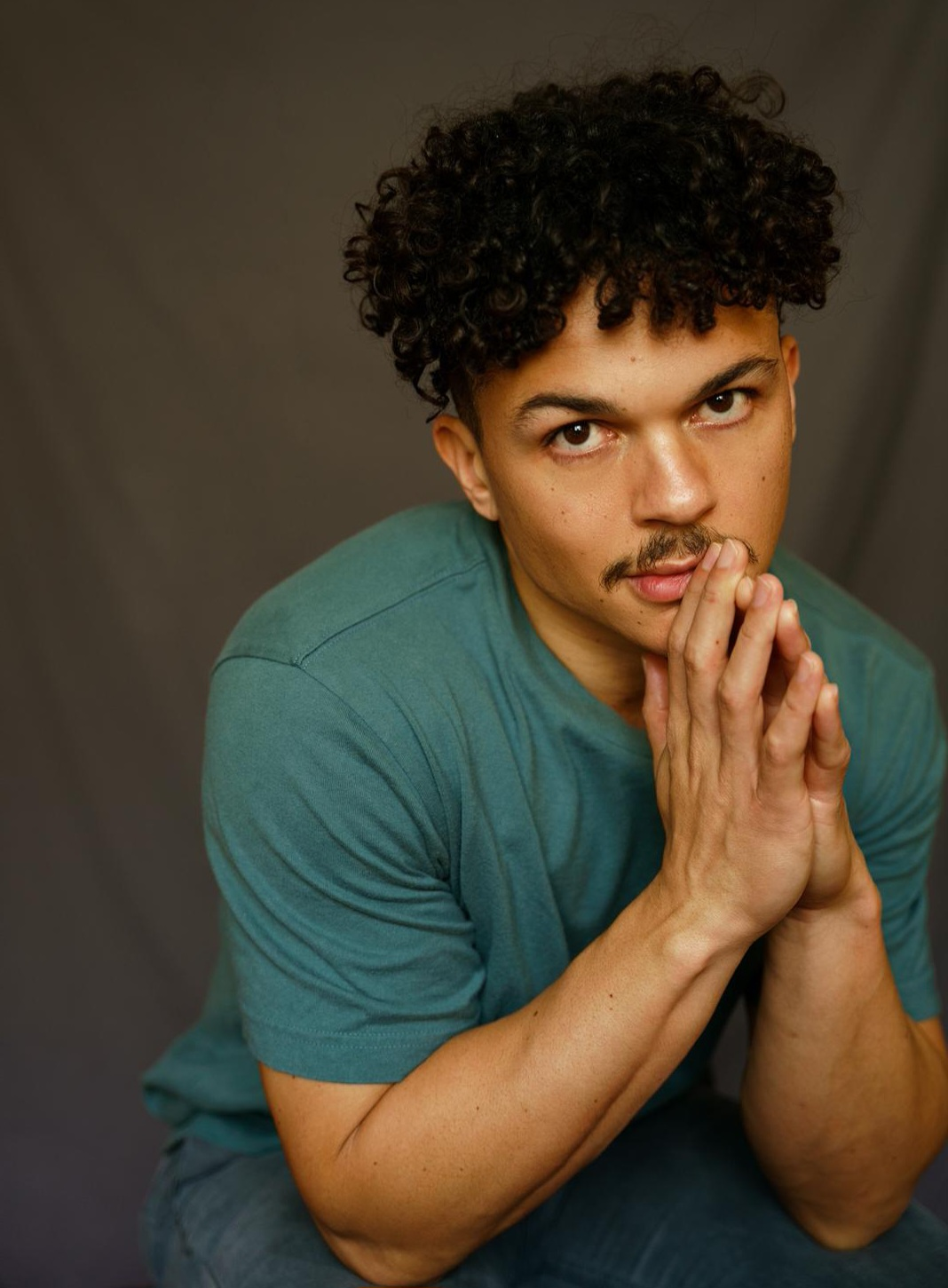
- Reece Noi
  Mossador (portrayed by Reece Noi) is a former slave who joined the rebellion against the masters of Meereen. In season 5, after the Sons of the Harpy rise and kill and Unsullied, Mossador advocates hunting them down and killing them without mercy, arguing that Meereen is not like Westeros and the only language the Meereenese understand is blood and violence. He is executed by Daario Naharis after murdering a captive Son without Daenerys's consent.
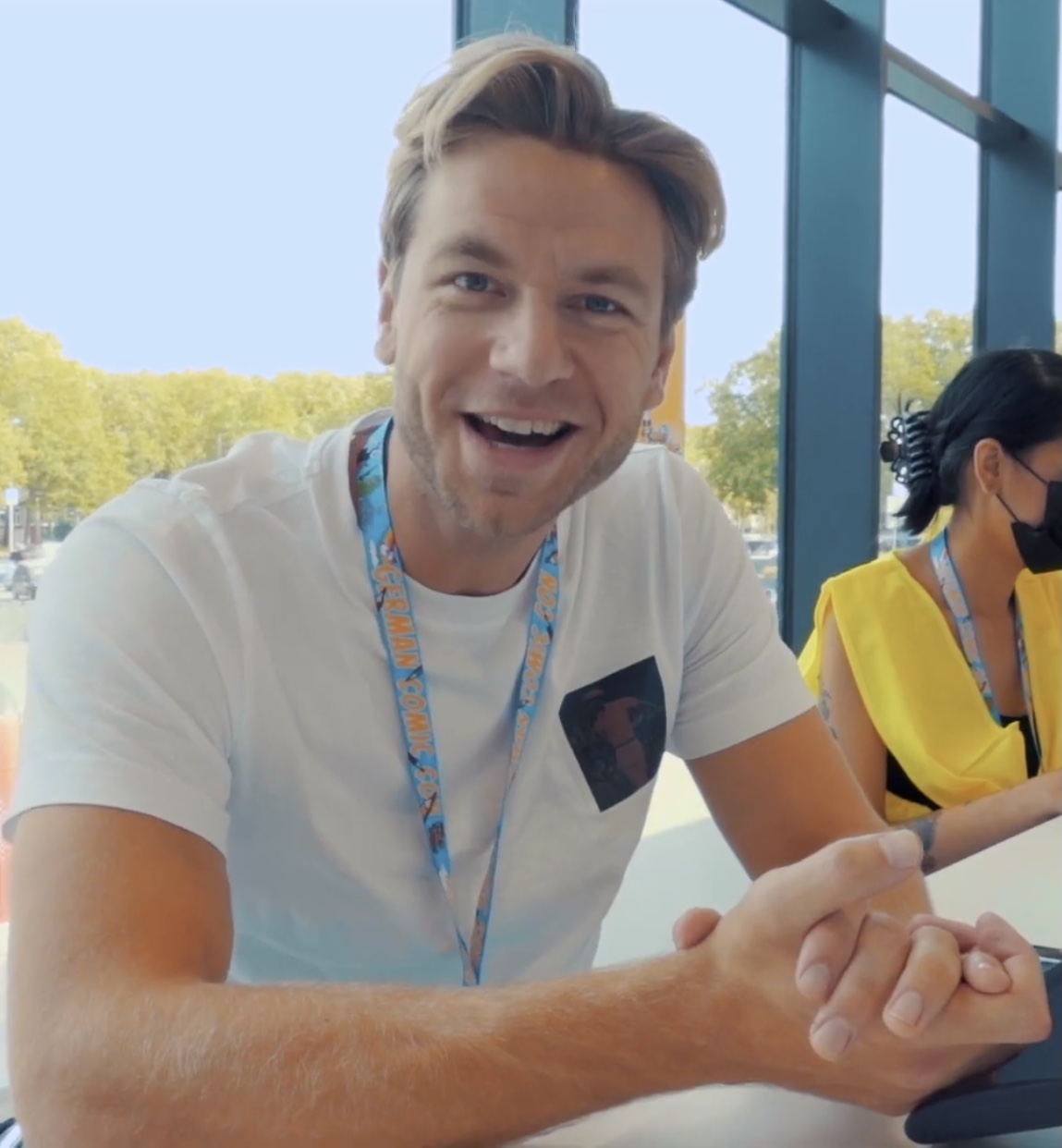
- Wilf Scolding
  Rhaegar Targaryen (portrayed by Wilf Scolding) was the eldest son and heir of King Aerys II Targaryen, and was the Prince of Dragonstone. He was the elder brother of Viserys and Daenerys Targaryen, and the husband of Elia Martell, a distant cousin with whom he had two children, Rhaenys and Aegon Targaryen. However, he annulled his marriage to Elia, and he secretly married Lyanna Stark with whom he has a child, Jon Snow. The parentage of Jon is kept a secret, and he is raised by Lyanna's brother, Eddard Stark as his bastard to protect him from the enemies of House Targaryen. Rhaegar was the assumed instigator of Robert's Rebellion after allegedly kidnapping Lyanna, Lord Robert Baratheon's betrothed.

=== House Tully ===
- Jonas Bracken (portrayed by Gerry O'Brien) is the Lord of Stone Hedge, a vassal of House Tully. After the execution of Lord Eddard Stark, Jonas urges that they pledge allegiance to King Renly Baratheon and travel south, although he later joins in the declaration of Robb Stark, as King in the North.
- Hoster Tully (portrayed by Christopher Newman) is the former Head of House Tully, Lord of Riverrun, and Lord Paramount of the Riverlands. He is the father of Lady Catelyn Tully, Lady Lysa Arryn and Lord Edmure Tully, and the elder brother of Ser Brynden Tully. Hoster died following the Battle of the Blackwater, and his funeral is attended by Catelyn, Edmure, and his grandson Robb Stark, the King in the North.
- Edmure Tully (portrayed by Tobias Menzies)
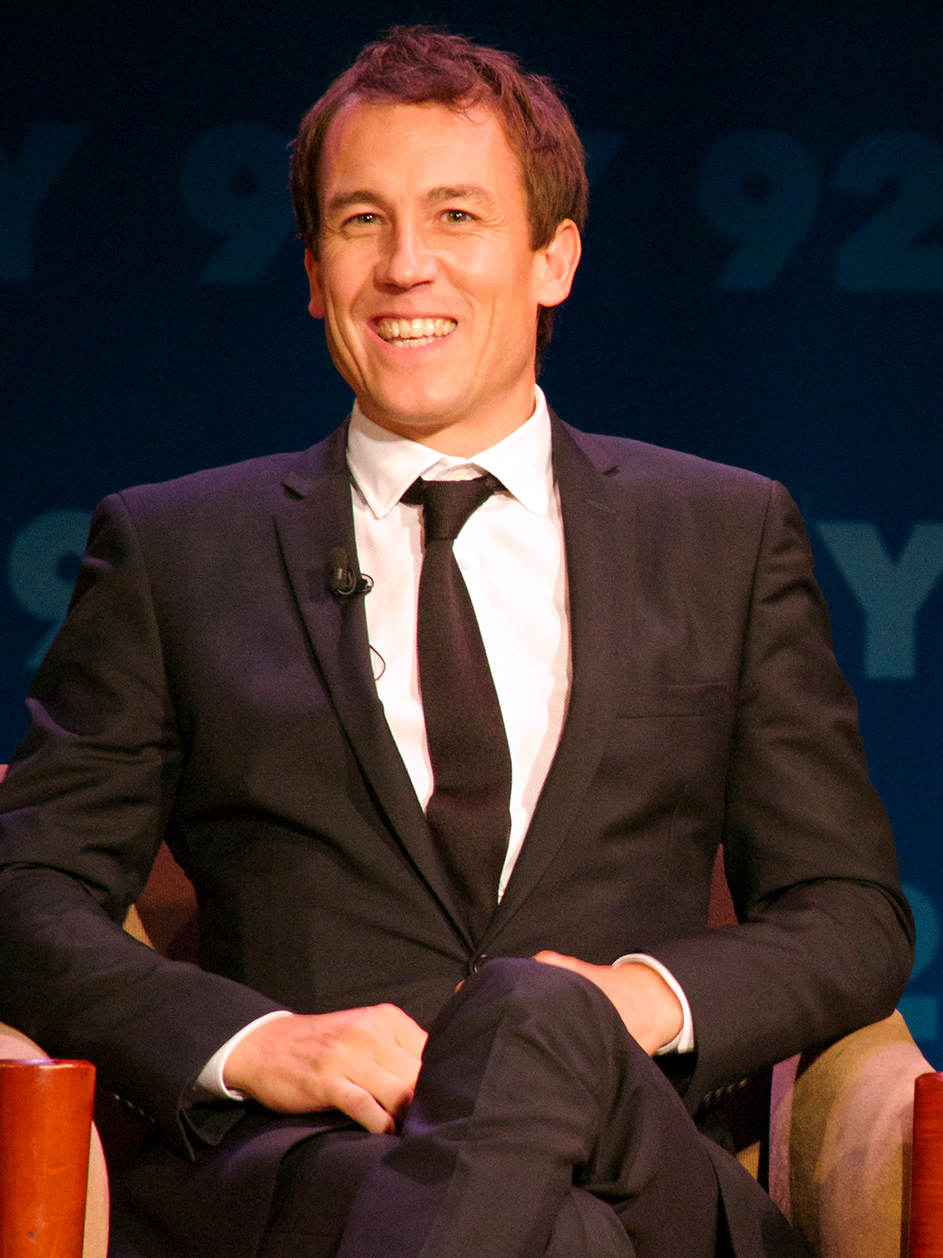
  Tobias Menzies
  is Catelyn and Lysa's younger brother and the Lord of Riverrun after the death of their father Hoster. A brash but good-hearted man, Edmure is not a good tactician but a skilled politician. To restore the alliance with Walder Frey, and to make amends with Robb Stark for unwittingly curtailing his plan to draw Tywin Lannister into battle, Edmure is promised to one of Frey's daughters, Roslin. Edmure and Roslin are wed and carried off for a "bedding ceremony", after which the Freys slaughter the Stark family in the "Red Wedding". He becomes a prisoner of the Freys after the death of his sister Catelyn and nephew Robb. When his uncle Brynden retakes Riverrun from the Freys, Edmure is used as a hostage to coerce Brynden into surrendering, but he refuses, while the Freys also refuse to kill Edmure. Jaime Lannister later meets with Edmure and falsely threatens his wife and baby child with death if he does not persuade Brynden to stand down. He is subsequently released and allowed into Riverrun, where he gives the order to surrender. The Lannisters and Freys retake the castle and Edmure is taken captive once more to ensure the Tullys' loyalty. He reappears in the series finale alongside the other lords and ladies of Westeros as they decide on their new king.
- Brynden Tully (portrayed by Clive Russell)
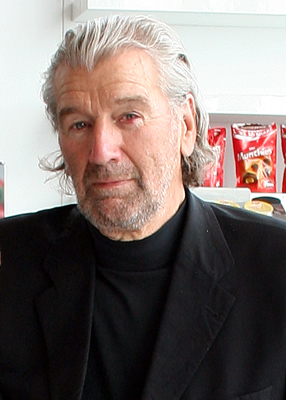
  Clive Russell
  is known as "the Blackfish", Ser Brynden is the uncle of Catelyn, Lysa, and Edmure, and a seasoned war veteran. He returns to Riverrun during season 3 before his older brother's death to make amends. He serves as both an adviser and confidant for both his niece Catelyn and grandnephew King Robb Stark. At Edmure's wedding to Roslin Frey at the Twins, Brynden excuses himself from the feast to "find a tree to piss on", and by so doing narrowly escapes the ensuing Red Wedding massacre when the Freys and Boltons betray the Starks. Lord Frey is visibly untouched by the man's absence, while Roose Bolton appears disturbed, aware that Brynden is capable of holding Riverrun (which has been granted to Lord Frey as payment) against the Iron Throne even with its technical lord, Edmure, in captivity. Brynden indeed retakes Riverrun from the Freys and holds it in Robb's name, refusing to surrender even when Edmure's life is threatened. The castle eventually falls when Edmure is allowed inside and gives the order to stand down. Brynden, however, refuses to surrender and chooses to fight to the death. He is later reported dead.

=== House Tyrell ===
- Loras Tyrell (portrayed by Finn Jones)
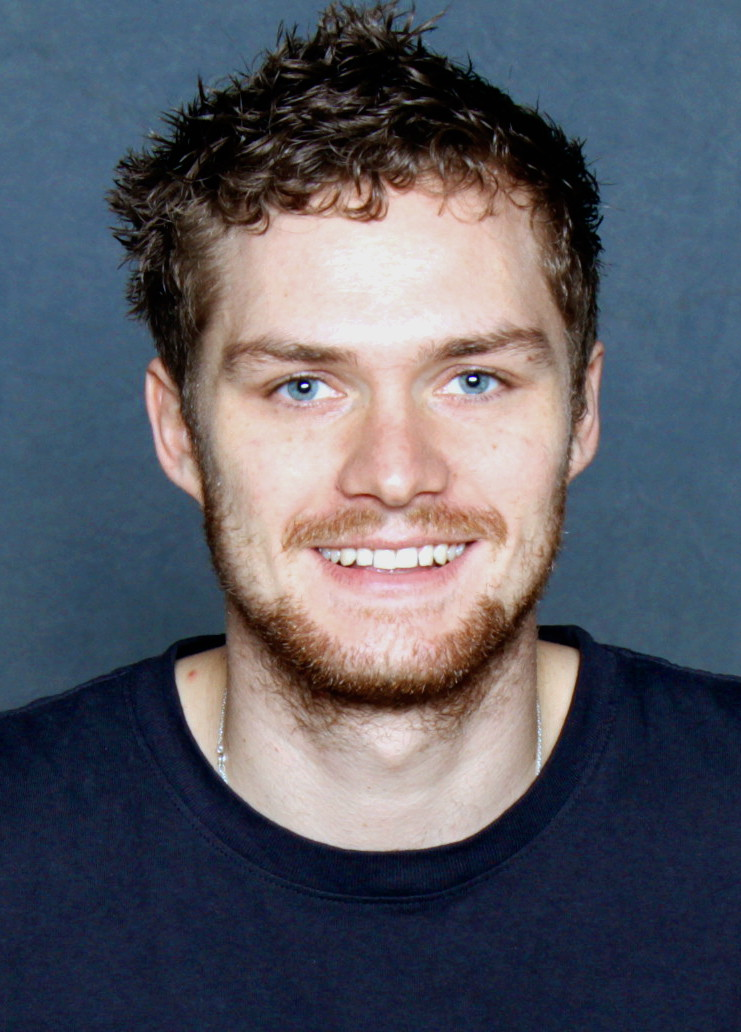
  Finn Jones
  is a highly skilled knight and jouster. Known across Westeros for his beauty, he is Renly Baratheon's former squire and secretly his lover. He is widely known throughout Westeros for defeating Jaime Lannister in a jousting match. In season 1, he charms Sansa Stark before his jousting match with Ser Gregor Clegane, but even though he wins, Clegane attacks him in a blind rage and he is only saved by Clegane's brother, Sandor, who Loras names as the champion in gratitude. In private, while shaving Renly, Loras makes it clear that he disapproves of both Joffrey and Stannis as Robert's closest heirs, and tells Renly that he would make a great king. In season 2 when Renly makes his claim for the Iron Throne, Loras and the rest of House Tyrell back his claim and cement their support by marrying Loras's sister Margaery to Renly. Loras and Renly remain inseparable even after Renly's wedding. After Renly's assassination, Loras goes berserk and vows vengeance against Stannis, but secretly blames himself for having pushed Renly to make his claim even though he was lawfully behind Stannis. When the Tyrells join the Lannister cause against Stannis, Loras fights wearing Renly's armor in honour of the fallen king at the Battle of the Blackwater. During season 3, his family plots to have him marry Sansa for Sansa and his family's benefit. However, he accidentally reveals this plot to his new lover and squire, Olyvar, who is actually a spy for Lord Baelish. Tywin stops the Tyrell plot by having Sansa marry his son Tyrion and engages Loras to his daughter Cersei. In season 4, at Joffrey and Margaery's wedding, Loras exchanges banter with Jaime, who warns Loras that if he marries Cersei, she will likely kill him in his sleep, and that he will never marry her. Loras counters that Jaime will not marry Cersei either, implying that he knows of his incestuous relationship with Cersei. He is later present at Tyrion's trial for murdering Joffrey, though he is apparently unaware that his grandmother, Olenna Tyrell, is the true killer. In season 5, he attends Tywin's funeral and offers his condolences to Cersei. He continues his sexual relationship with Olyvar, flirtatiously suggesting that they should move to Dorne, where homosexuality is more tolerated, and expresses doubt that to Margaery that he is still obliged to marry Cersei with Tywin gone. He is later present at Tommen and Margaery's wedding and, during a training session, is suddenly arrested for his homosexuality by the recently reinstated Faith Militant. He denies all of the Faith's allegations against him, including his affair with Renly, during an inquest presided by the High Sparrow, but eventually loses his temper when Olyvar testifies against him, citing his birthmark "in the shape of Dorne" he has on his thigh as proof. This prompts the Faith to incarcerate both him and his sister, the latter for perjuring herself in front of the gods in an effort to protect him, and to open formal trials for them. In the sixth season, after being tortured for almost a year, Loras admits to his "crimes" on the day of his trial and joins the Faith Militant to survive and a seven-pointed star is carved on his forehead. Though he is accepted into their ranks, he is killed when the Great Sept of Baelor is destroyed by wildfire on Cersei's orders.
- Olenna Tyrell (portrayed by Diana Rigg)
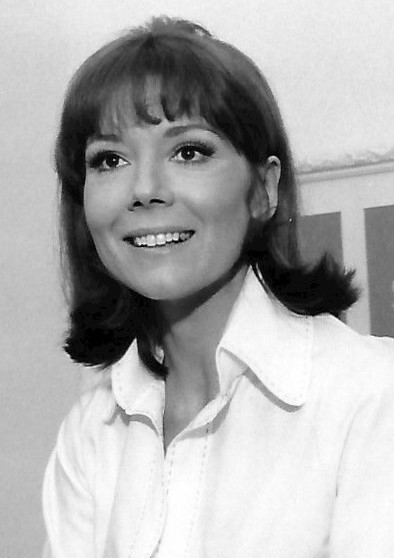
  Diana Rigg
  is known as "the Queen of Thorns", is the sharp-witted grandmother of Loras and Margaery. Considered Tywin Lannister's female counterpart, Olenna is a matriarch and the real power behind House Tyrell. She has very progressive views where she feels women should be more involved in politics and is accepting of Loras' homosexuality where the people of Reach have no problems with it. After asking Sansa directly what Joffrey is like, and believing Sansa that Joffrey is an abusive "monster", Olenna decides to protect both Margaery and Sansa. To prevent the other nobles from using her as heir of the North, Olenna secretly plots to have Sansa marry Loras. But her plan is foiled by Loras himself, who accidentally reveals it to Littlefinger's male spy in the brothel, who reports to Tywin Lannister. Tywin forces Sansa marry his son Tyrion and, to secure the Reach, orders Cersei to marry Loras. Lady Olenna is at first against Loras marrying Cersei because she says Cersei is too old, and because of the scandal of Cersei's incestuous affair with her twin brother, Jaime. Tywin threatens to make Loras join the celibate Kingsguard, which would make Joffrey and Margaery's children the heirs of the Reach. Olenna admits defeat and praises Tywin for outwitting her. In season 4, Olenna conspires with Petyr Baelish to have Joffrey poisoned, to protect Margaery from Joffrey's beastly nature, and advises Margaery to become acquainted with her new match, Tommen Baratheon, Joffrey's malleable, much younger brother and heir. She returns to Highgarden shortly afterwards. When Loras is arrested by the recently reinstated Faith Militant for his homosexuality, Margaery writes to her grandmother who returns to the capital to protect her grandchildren from Cersei's schemes. But, mistakenly believing Loras's arrest was simply meant to humiliate House Tyrell, she helplessly assists Olyvar's testimony which incriminates her grandson, as well as to Margaery's incarceration for perjuring herself in front of the gods. Olenna later confronts the High Sparrow without results and has a secret meeting with Littlefinger who, blackmailed by Olenna for his part in Joffrey's death, and to placate his role in her grandchildren's imprisonment in providing Olyvar to Cersei, gives valuable information about Lancel and Cersei's adulterous relationship. This results in the arrest of Cersei by the Faith Militant. In the sixth season, Olenna takes steps to free Margaery from the High Sparrow and retake power from the Faith Militant, but the plan is thwarted when Tommen forges an alliance with the Faith and becomes the High Sparrow's new puppet. Margaery feigns loyalty to the Faith and manages to instruct Olenna to leave the city when the High Sparrow threatens her life. After hearing of the Great Sept of Baelor's destruction, which killed Mace, Loras and Margaery, Olenna vows revenge. She accepts an invitation to Dorne by Ellaria Sand, who reveals that she has followed Yara Greyjoy in declaring for Daenerys Targaryen. Seeking vengeance against Cersei for her slain family, Olenna pledges the Tyrell forces to Daenerys as well. When the Lannisters, supported by the turncoat Tarly forces formerly loyal to the Tyrells, attack Highgarden, they win with ease. Jaime Lannister finds Olenna in her tower, ready to be taken captive or killed. Jaime tells Olenna that Cersei had dreamed up horrible deaths for her but that he had persuaded his sister to let him offer Olenna poison instead. After drinking the poison Olenna confesses proudly to Joffrey's murder.
- Mace Tyrell (portrayed by Roger Ashton-Griffiths)
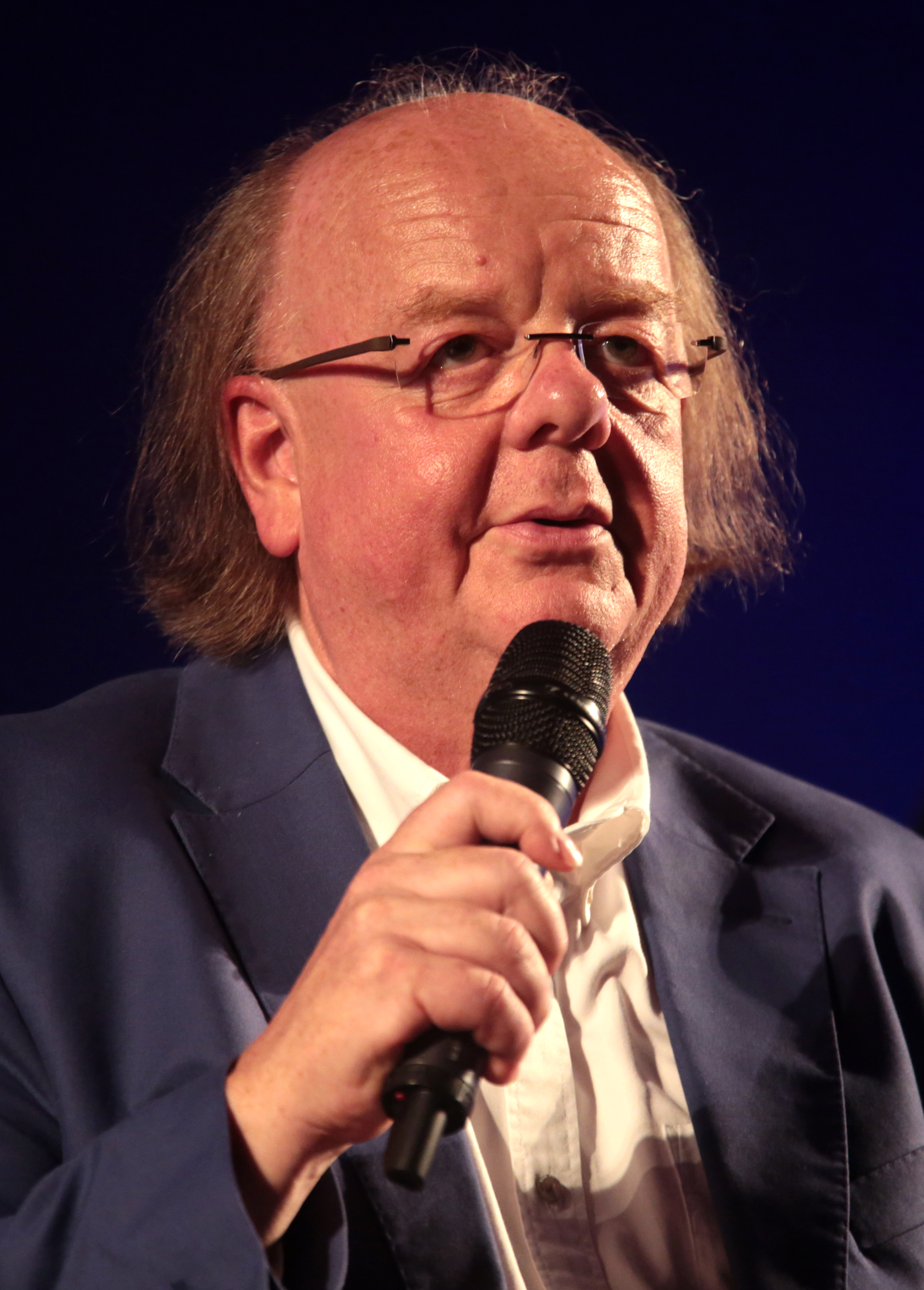
  Roger Ashton-Griffiths
  is the Lord of Highgarden, Defender of the Marches, High Marshal of the Reach, and Warden of the South, he is the buffoonish father of Loras and Margaery, and Lady Olenna's son. Lady Olenna has a low opinion of Mace, whom she calls "Lord Oaf". Originally Hand of the King to Renly Baratheon before the latter's death during the War of the Five Kings, Mace agrees to a Lannister-Tyrell alliance as proposed by Petyr Baelish. He is named Master of Ships on Joffrey's Small Council, and attends Joffrey and Margaery's wedding. After Joffrey's death, Mace serves as one of the judges at the trial of his accused murderer, Tyrion Lannister. He is later present at Tywin Lannister's funeral and at Tommen and Margaery's wedding, and, in spite of offering himself as Hand of the King to Tommen, he is instead named Master of Coin by Cersei who, in the aim of keeping him away from the capital while she schemes against his daughter, sends him to renegotiate the royal debt with the Iron Bank of Braavos. He later arrives in Braavos, and is unsuccessful in his attempt to win over Tycho Nestoris, who is unimpressed with his buffoonish ways. In the sixth season, he returns to King's Landing with the Tyrell army to free Margaery from the Faith Militant alongside Jaime Lannister but is foiled when Tommen forges an alliance with the High Sparrow. He is later killed in the destruction of the Great Sept of Baelor after being horrified, but unable to protect his son as he was mutilated by the Faith Militant.
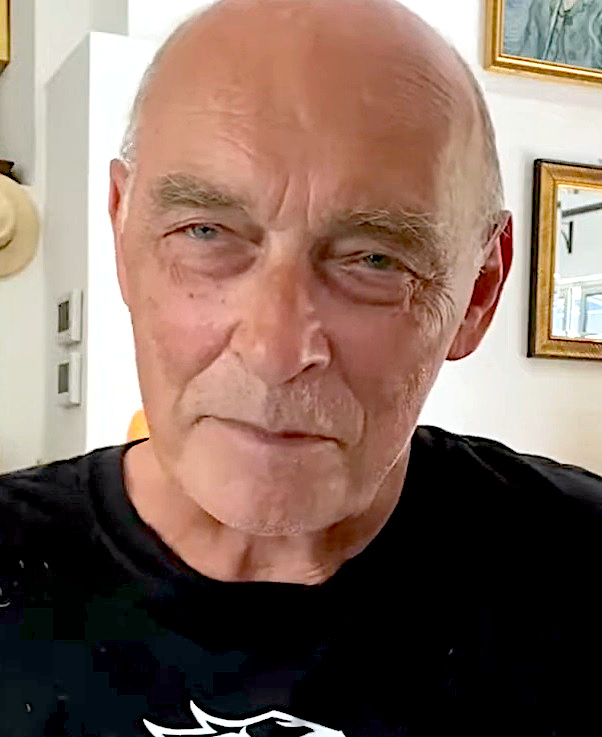
- James Faulkner
  Randyll Tarly (portrayed by James Faulkner) is the Lord of Horn Hill and the head of House Tarly, a vassal family of House Tyrell of Highgarden. Randyll is the father of Samwell Tarly, and one of the greatest soldiers in Westeros. He has a humorless martinet, is severe and intimidating. He demands martial discipline in the field and in his home. He forces Sam to join the Night's Watch on threat of death. In the sixth season, he is not pleased when Sam returns to Horn Hill with Gilly and his supposed son with her, and enraged when he realizes Gilly is a wildling. Despite his hatred for the wildlings, Randyll agrees to let Gilly work in the kitchens and raise the baby as a bastard of House Tarly, on the condition that Sam never again set foot in Horn Hill when he leaves for Oldtown. Sam ultimately takes Gilly and the baby with him, and takes House Tarly's ancestral Valyrian steel sword, Heartsbane. In the seventh season Jaime Lannister persuades Lord Randyll to side with the Lannisters against the Tyrells. This goes well initially as the Tarlys help capture Highgarden, but when Daenerys ambushes the Tarly and Lannister forces they are soundly defeated. Daenerys demands that the Tarlys and their few surviving soldiers, now captives, bend the knee. Randyll refuses and is executed by dragonfire.
- Melessa Tarly (portrayed by Samantha Spiro) is the wife of Lord Randyll Tarly of Horn Hill and mother of Samwell Tarly of the Night's Watch. She is a sweet, plump, and adoring mother, and has a soft spot for Samwell. When Sam returns to Horn Hill with Gilly and her baby on the way to Oldtown, she greets him warmly, and becomes infuriated when Randyll insults Sam and Gilly during dinner.
- Talla Tarly (portrayed by Rebecca Benson) is a kind, friendly and unpretentious woman, and the sister of Samwell Tarly. She greets Sam warmly when he returns to Horn Hill with Gilly and her baby on his way to Oldtown.
- Dickon Tarly (portrayed by Freddie Stroma in season 6, and by Tom Hopper in season 7)
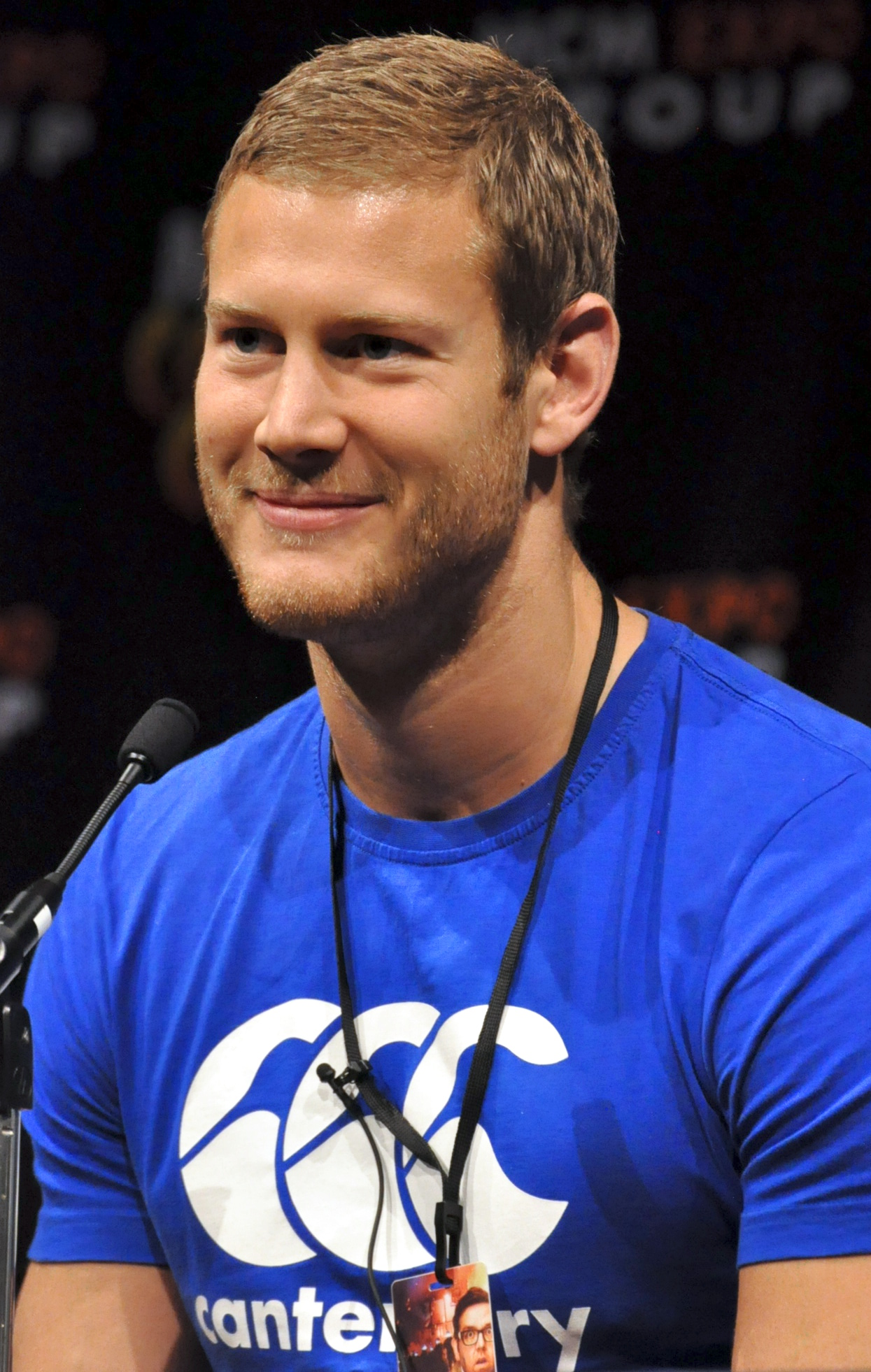
  Tom Hopper
  is an athletic, a good hunter, an excellent swordsman, manly, not particularly bright but the favorite child of his father, Lord Randyll. He is the younger brother of Samwell Tarly, but was pronounced heir when Samwell was sent to the Night's Watch. He greets Sam warmly when he returns to Horn Hill with Gilly and her baby on their way to Oldtown, but his dismissal of Sam's claims that he killed a White Walker is what leads Randyll to realize Gilly is a wildling. Dickon acquits himself well enough in his first real battle, but his second - against Daenerys, her Dothraki and her dragon - ends in defeat. Captured, he is urged by his father to bend the knee to Daenerys and save himself, but instead he stands with his father in refusing. He is executed by dragonfire.

=== Dothraki ===
- Khal Drogo (portrayed by Jason Momoa)
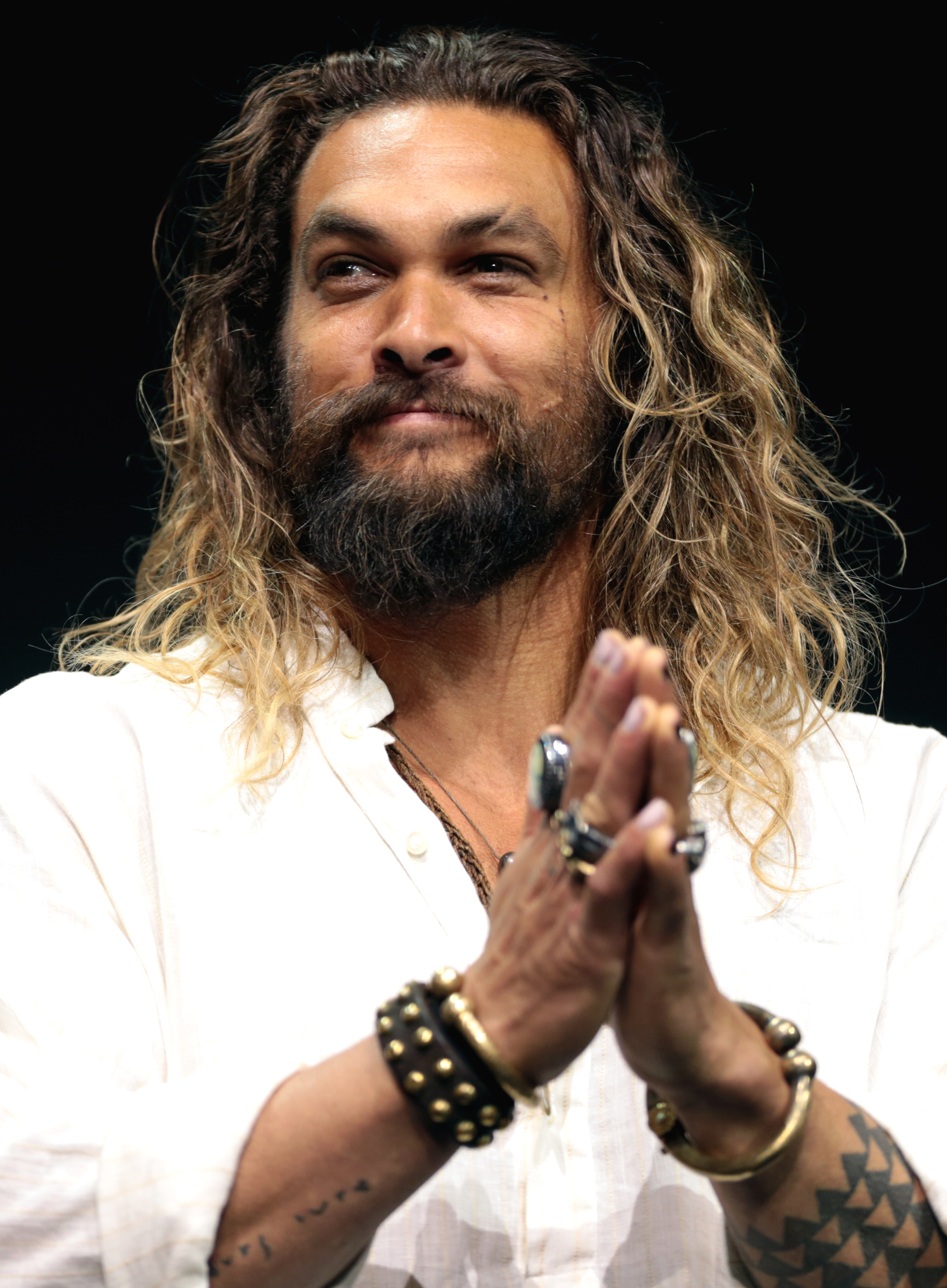
  Jason Momoa
  is a warlord of the Dothraki people. He is to marry Daenerys Targaryen, as arranged by her brother Viserys. He is undefeated in battle. Viserys Targaryen conspired with Magister Illyrio to marry Daenerys to Drogo to get his support in an invasion of Westeros. Though Daenerys is initially unhappy with the arrangement, Drogo proves to be a sensitive husband and lover despite his fearsome behavior with his men. After a failed poisoning attempt on Daenerys' life, he promises to invade Westeros to reclaim the Seven Kingdoms for the Targaryens, but Viserys's impertinence ultimately causes Drogo to kill him. Drogo maintains his promise for the benefit of his wife but is wounded by an enemy khal before he can begin the invasion. The wound festers and Drogo becomes so sick that he is unable to ride his horse, a sign of weakness to the Dothraki. Most of his khalasar abandons him, but Daenerys unknowingly sacrifices their unborn child for a spell to revive him. The spell works but leaves him a brain-dead husk of his former self. Daenerys smothers him out of pity, and the flames of his funeral pyre ultimately hatch her dragon eggs.
- Mirri Maz Duur (portrayed by Mia Soteriou) is a "Maegi", or witch-woman, held captive by Khal Drogo's horde. Before her capture, she had been a godswife (priestess) in the Temple of the Great Shepherd. When Drogo and his men attack her town and take her prisoner, Daenerys gives Mirri and the other victims protection from further attacks. When Khal Drogo is wounded in a fight, Daenerys asks for Mirri's help to cure it, but Mirri betrays her in revenge for the attack on her village, leaving Drogo in a permanent vegetative state and causing the then-pregnant Daenerys to miscarry her son Rhaego. In revenge, Daenerys has Mirri burned to death on Drogo's funeral pyre.
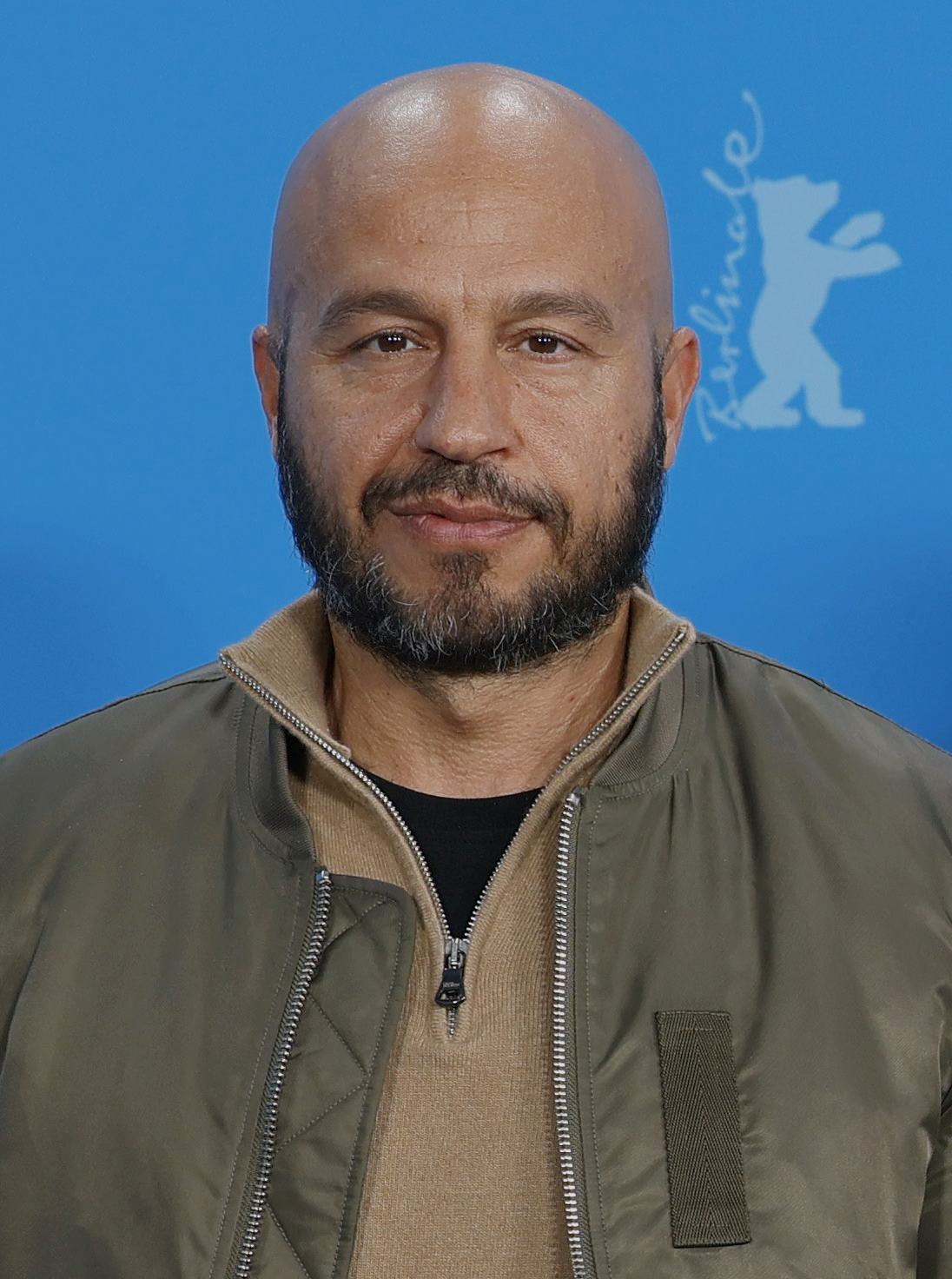
- Dar Salim
  Qotho (portrayed by Dar Salim) is a fierce and hot-tempered bloodrider under Khal Drogo. After Drogo's incapacitation, some of the bloodriders try to stop Daenerys from taking him to the witch Mirri Maz Duur. Qotho kills Quaro in the ensuing fight and is in turn killed by Ser Jorah Mormont.
- Qhono (portrayed by Staz Nair) is a Dothraki warrior, first in Khal Moro's khalasar and later a lieutenant for Daenerys Targaryen. Qhono comments on Daenerys after taking her captive, and later kneels to her when she comes out of the fire. Qhono later crosses the Narrow Sea with Daenerys, and confiscates Jon Snow and Davos Seaworth's weapons when they arrive on Dragonstone to talk with Daenerys. Qhono later oversees the Battle of Goldroad with Tyrion Lannister, commenting that his people do not fight well against the Dothraki. He is present during the Dragonpit Summit. Qhono travels to Winterfell, to fight against the Army of the Dead, and later informs Daenerys that the dragons are not eating. At the Battle of Winterfell, Qhono serves alongside Jorah Mormont, when, before the charge, Melisandre casts magical spell, lighting the blades of the Dothraki. During the charge Qhono is slaughtered, and later is reanimated by the Night King, where his body attacks Drogon, although he is later destroyed when the Night King is killed by Arya Stark.
- Aggo (portrayed by Chuku Modu) was a Dothraki warrior in Khal Moro's khalasar. Aggo comments on Daenerys Targaryen's appearance after they have taken her captive. In Vaes Dothrak, Aggo and Iggo encounter Jorah Mormont and Daario Naharis as they attempt to infiltrate the city to find Daenerys. Aggo battles Jorah, who he overpowers, but is stabbed in the back by Daario before he can kill him. To hide the wound, Daario bludgeons Aggo's corpse with a rock
- Khal Moro (portrayed by Joe Naufahu) is a Dothraki Khal whose khalasar finds Daenerys after she flees Meereen. Out of respect for Khal Drogo, Moro takes Daenerys to the Temple of the Dosh Khaleen to live the rest of her life with the widows of former Khals. When Daenerys refuses to submit, Moro and the other Khals threaten her with being raped and killed. Daenerys responds by burning the temple down with the Khals inside and taking over the entire khalasar.
- Iggo (portrayed by Deon Lee-Williams) was a Dothraki warrior in Khal Moro's khalasar. In Vaes Dothrak, Iggo and Aggo encounter Jorah Mormont and Daario Naharis as they attempt to infiltrate the city to find Daenerys. Iggo's neck is snapped by Daario.
- High Priestess of the Dosh Khaleen (portrayed by Souad Faress) is the leader of the dosh khaleen, the widows of former Khals.
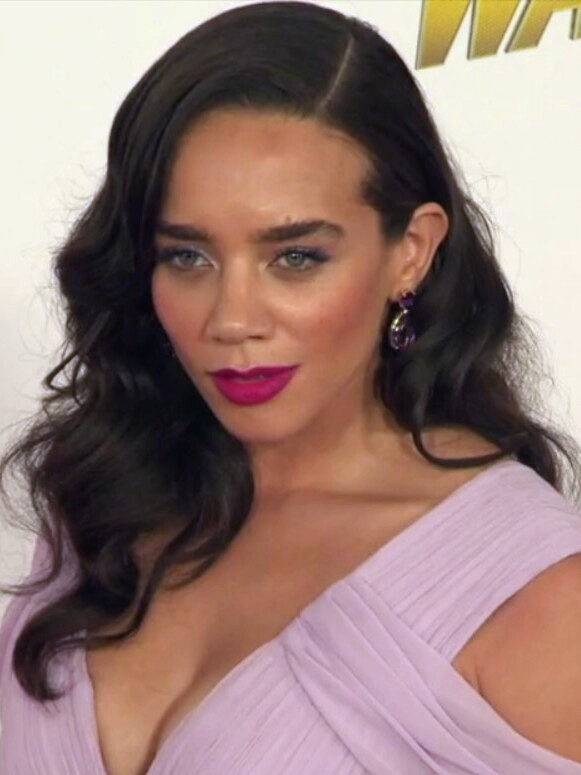
- Hannah John-Kamen
  Ornella (portrayed by Hannah John-Kamen) is a young member of the Dosh khaleen who befriends Daenerys Targaryen.
- Khal Rhalko (portrayed by Andrei Claude) was a Dothraki khal. Alongside other khals, and bloodriders they are gathered to decide if Daenerys Targaryen should enter the Dosh Khaleen. Rhalko advocates for raping her. Rhalko is later burned alive after Danerys tips over a fiery pillar.
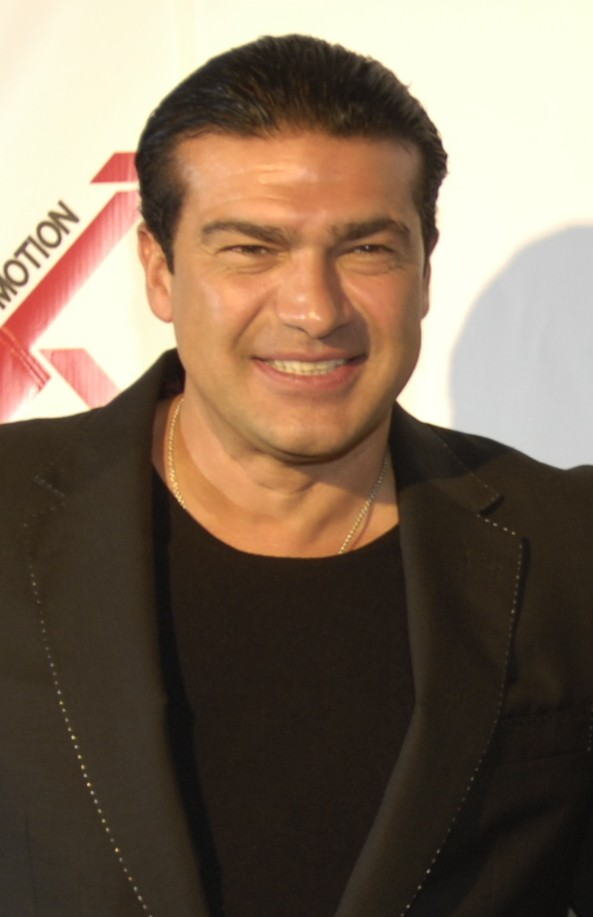
- Tamer Hassan
  Khal Forzho (portrayed by Tamer Hassan) was a Dothraki khal. Alongside other khals, and bloodriders, they are gathered to decide if Daenerys Targaryen should enter the Dosh Khaleen. Forzho is later burned alive after Danerys tips over a fiery pillar.

=== Qarth ===
- Quaithe (portrayed by Laura Pradelska) is an enigmatic priestess of Asshai whom Daenerys meets in Qarth, where she warns Daenerys about the local warlocks.
- Xaro Xhoan Daxos (portrayed by Nonso Anozie)
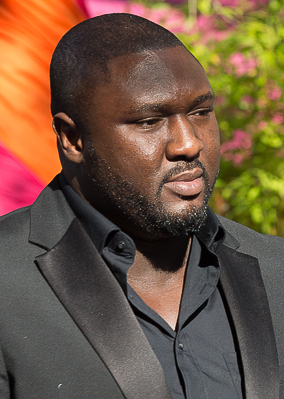
  Nonso Anozie
  A rich merchant "prince" of Qarth who vouches for Daenerys when she and her starving entourage wish to enter the city. He claims extremely humble background, having worked his way to wealth from nothing. He repeatedly asks Daenerys to marry him, but she refuses. Xaro eventually betrays Daenerys, allowing the warlocks to kidnap her dragons and kill several of her people, and crowns himself "King of Qarth" as part of a plan to render the city less isolationist. After Daenerys rescues her dragons and returns, she locks him alive in his vault, finding it to have been empty the whole time.
- Pyat Pree (portrayed by Ian Hanmore)
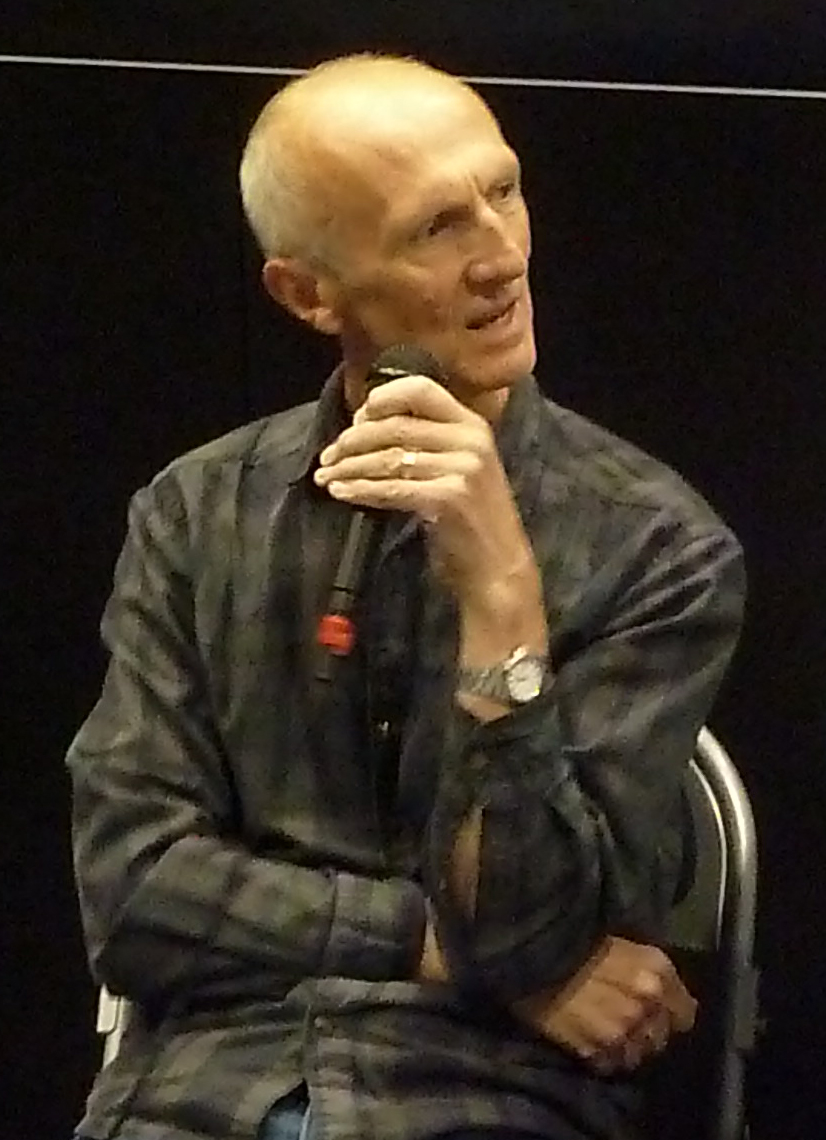
  Ian Hanmore
  is a warlock from the city of Qarth. He tries to lure Daenerys to the House of the Undying, the warlocks' lair, by stealing her dragons but Daenerys defeats him, rescues her dragons, and escapes.
- The Spice King (portrayed by Nicholas Blane) is the leader of the Ancient Guild of Spicers, one of the merchant groups vying in Qarth. He is one of many powerful Qarthites whom Daenerys asks for ships and funding to mount a campaign in Westeros, but he is rude to Daenerys in a polite way by pointing out that without an army, she cannot regain the Iron Throne. He is killed by the warlock Pyat Pree as part of his coup with Xaro Xoan Daxos.
- The Silk King (portrayed by Slavko Juraga) is a member of the Thirteen of Qarth. He refuses to aid Daenerys Targaryen in her conquest of Westros, citing that it will offend the Lannisters, his best customers. He is killed by the warlock Pyat Pree as part of his coup with Xaro Xoan Daxos

=== Slaver Cities ===
- Kraznys mo Nakloz (portrayed by Dan Hildebrand) is a wealthy slaver from the Ghiscari city of Astapor. Sexist and rude, he repeatedly insults to Daenerys in Valyrian, not realizing she speaks the language. He agrees to sell Daenerys 8,000 slave-soldiers called the Unsullied in exchange for one of her dragons, throwing in his translator, Missandei, as a bonus. Daenerys reveals she speaks Valyrian and orders her new army to kill the Astapori slavers. Kraznys is killed by Drogon.
- Greizhen mo Ullhor (portrayed by Clifford Barry) was a slave-trader in the city of Astapor. He negotiates with Daenerys Targaryen, when she purchases an unsullied army, alongside half-trained warriors, which Greizhen opposes, concerned that if these half-trained warriors fail on the battlefield it would shame Astapor. After purchasing the Unsullied, Greizhen is killed, when Daenerys orders the Unsullied to kill the good masters.
- Razdal mo Eraz (portrayed by George Georgiou) is a slave-trader from the city of Yunkai, on the coast of Slaver's Bay, and one of the Wise Masters, the ruling elite of the city. He attempts to parley with Daenerys for her to leave Yunkai, but she refuses and takes the city. Later, he helps fund the Sons of the Harpy to resist Daenerys's rule over Slaver's Bay and breaks a peace treaty with Tyrion Lannister. He is killed by Grey Worm when the slavers' attack on Meereen is thwarted.
- Mero (portrayed by Mark Killeen) was a Braavosi captain of the sellsword company, the Second Sons. He is nicknamed the 'Titan's Bastard', due to his size. He meets with Daeneyrs Targaryen alongside his fellow captain Prendahl na Ghezn and lieutenant, Daario Naharis, where he insults her and her company. He and Ghezn send Daario to assassinate Daenerys, but is beheaded by Daario instead.
- Prendahl na Ghezn (portrayed by Ramon Tikaram) is a captain of the sellsword company, the Second Sons. He meets with Daeneyrs Targaryen alongside his fellow captain Mero and lieutenant, Daario Naharis. He and Mero send Daario to assassinate Daenerys, but is beheaded by Daario instead.
- Vala (portrayed by Meena Rayann) is a prostitute in Meereen who is secretly in league with the Sons of the Harpy, a resistance movement against Daenerys Targaryen. Her actions cause the death of several Unsullied and Ser Barristan Selmy. She is later captured by Varys and forced to reveal who are funding the Sons of the Harpy on pain of death and her son becoming an orphan. She cooperates and is sent to Pentos with her son to live peacefully.
- Malko (portrayed by Adewale Akinnuoye-Agbaje) is a captain of a slaving ship. He captures and sells Tyrion Lannister and Jorah Mormont.
- Yezzan zo Qaggaz (portrayed by Enzo Cilenti)
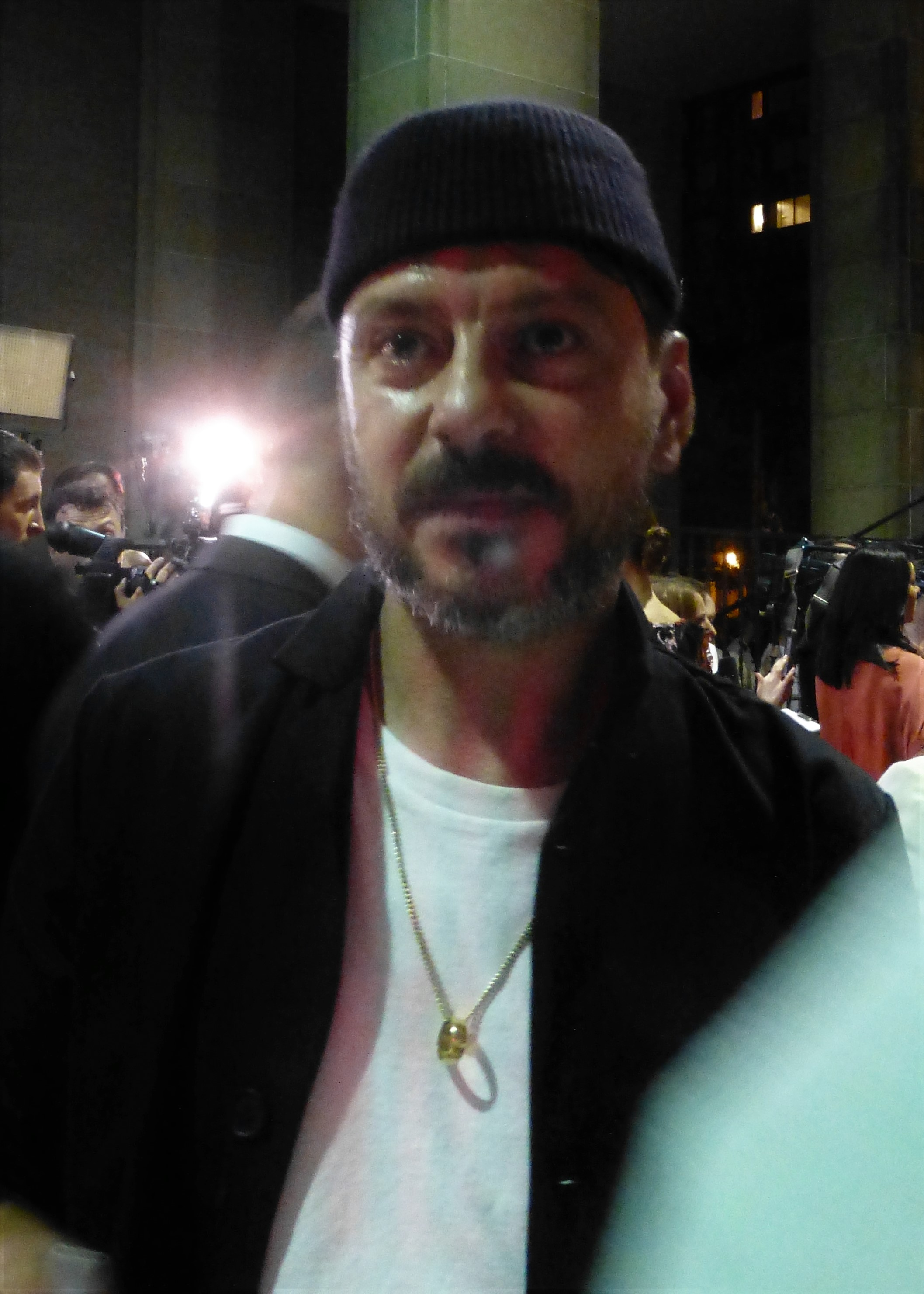
  Enzo Cilenti
  is a slave-trader from the city of Meereen, on the coast of Slaver's Bay, and one of the Great Masters, the former ruling elite of the city. He buys Jorah Mormont and Tyrion Lannister after they are captured by Malko and takes them to a fighting pit to train as gladiators, though he loses both Tyrion and Jorah when they are accepted into Daenerys Targaryen's inner circle. He, along with Razdal mo Eraz and Belicho Paenymion, negotiates with Tyrion in Daenerys's absence and they reach an accord to end slavery throughout seven years in exchange for ordering the Sons of the Harpy to stand down, but they go back on their word and order a naval assault on Meereen. When Daenerys's dragons defeat the slaver fleet, Yezzan is betrayed by Razdal and Belicho and handed over to be killed by Grey Worm, who kills the other two instead. Tyrion instructs Yezzan to warn his friends about angering Daenerys further.
- Belicho Paenymion (portrayed by Eddie Jackson) is a prominent noble of the Free City of Volantis, and a member of the "Old Blood", descendants of the original Valyrian settlers of the city. Like most of the Volantene nobility, Belicho is involved in the slave trade and funds the Sons of the Harpy to resist Daenerys. After breaking a peace pact with Tyrion Lannister, his throat is slit by Grey Worm when their attack on Meereen fails.
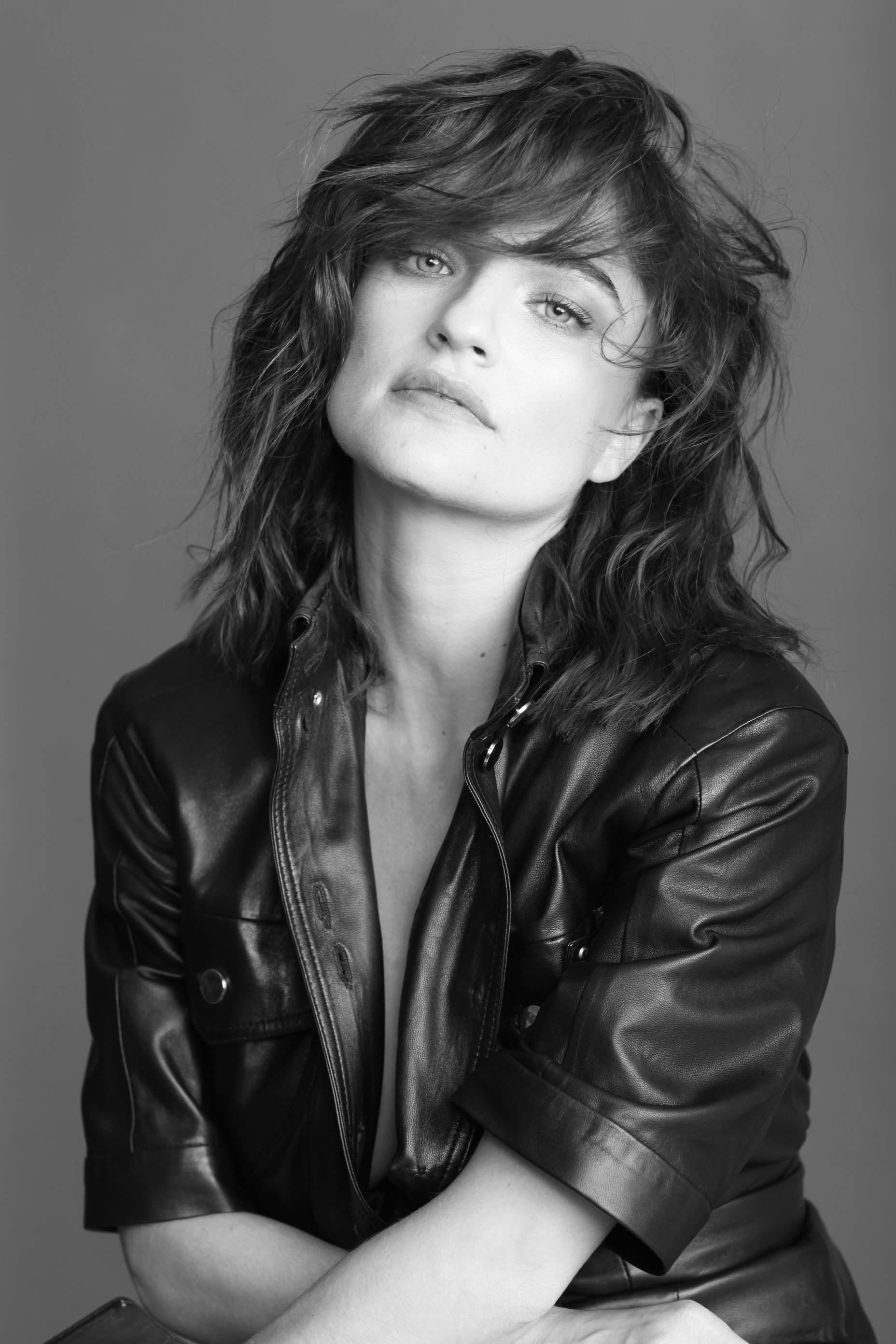
- Ania Bukstein
  Kinvara (portrayed by Ania Bukstein) is the High Priestess of the Red Temple of Volantis, one of the high-ranking leaders in the religion of R'hllor, the Lord of Light. Tyrion Lannister and Varys enlist her help in acquiring the common peoples' support for Daenerys, whom she believes to be the Prince that Was Promised, destined to defeat the Night King.

=== Braavos ===
- Tycho Nestoris (portrayed by Mark Gatiss)
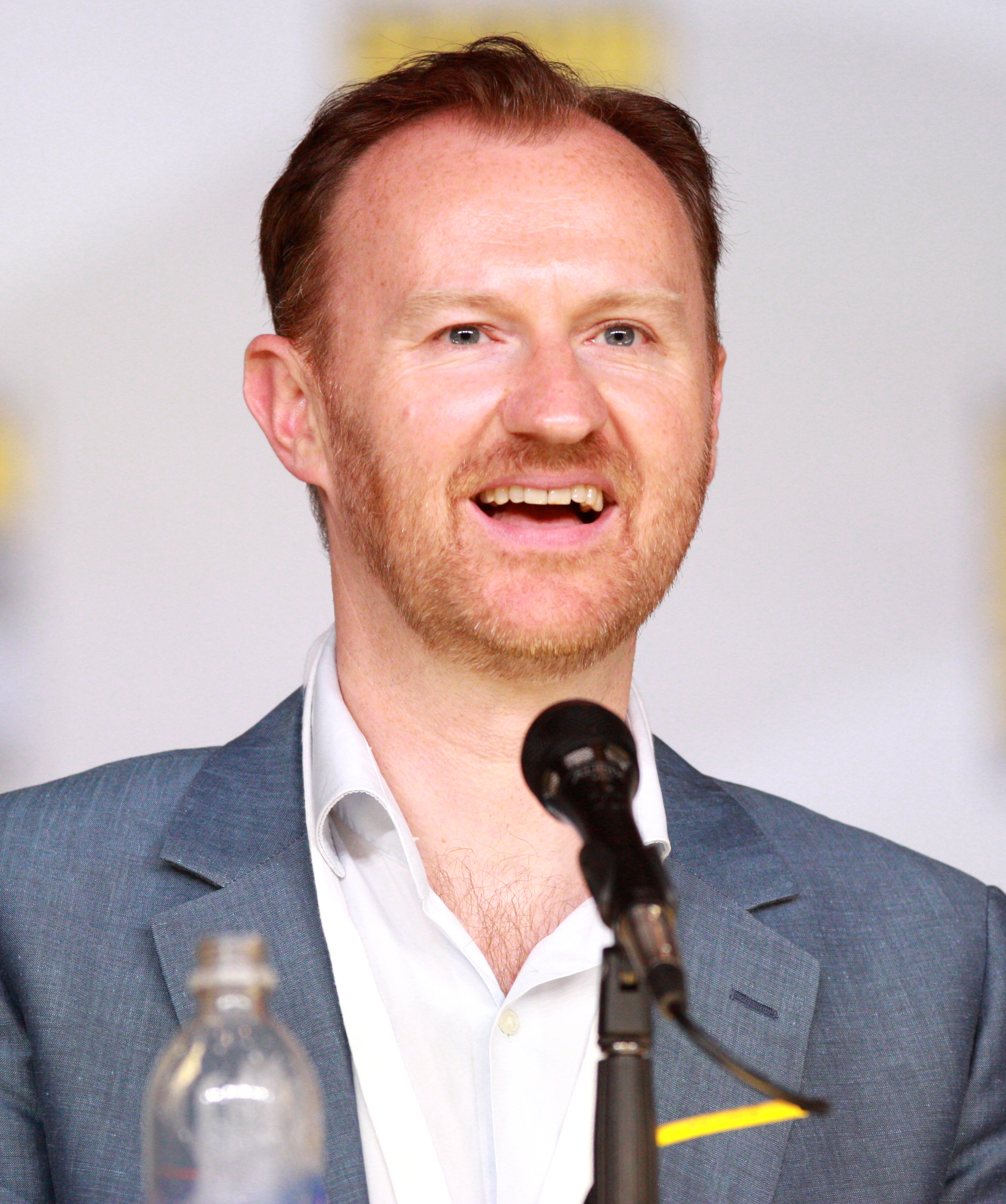
  Mark Gatiss
  is a representative of the Iron Bank of Braavos. He initially refuses to loan Stannis Baratheon money to help him hire mercenaries, but Davos Seaworth changes his mind. In season 5, Tycho greets Mace Tyrell, who has been sent to renegotiate the royal debt. In season 7 he arrives in King's Landing to collect the debt, expecting to be met with a default. He is impressed when Cersei, newly enriched by the captured Tyrell treasury, pays the debt in full and he agrees to Cersei's request for further funding.
- Lhara (portrayed by Saine Sofair) is a sex worker in Braavos. She entertained the pirate Sallenor Saan, and later becomes a regular customer of ‘Lanna’, who sells oysters.
- Ternesio Terys (portrayed by Gary Oliver) is the captain of the Titan's Daughter, a trading galleon from Braavos. After being presented the iron coin by Arya Stark, he sails her to Braavos.
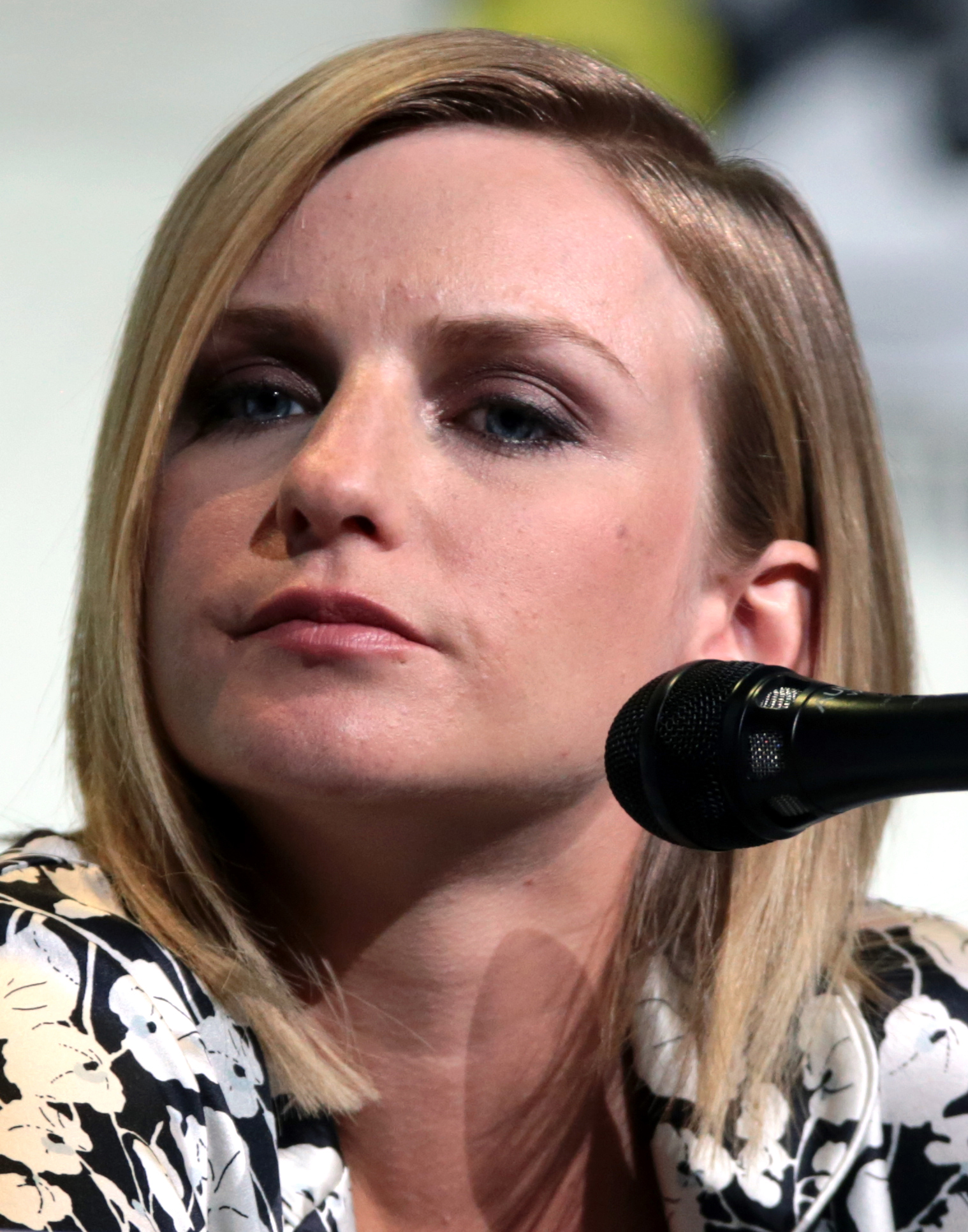
- Faye Marsay
  The Waif (portrayed by Faye Marsay) is a sadistic young woman who lives in the House of Black and White, a temple to the Many-faced God, in Braavos. She participates in Arya's training but repeatedly deems her unfit to become a Faceless Man (assassin). After Arya is struck blind for her unsanctioned killing of Ser Meryn Trant, the Waif repeatedly beats and abuses Arya, though Arya learns how to fight without her eyesight and her vision is soon returned to her. When Arya refuses to kill an innocent target, Lady Crane, the Waif is sent to kill her. Though she stabs Arya multiple times, Arya survives. The Waif then kills Lady Crane and pursues the wounded Arya all over Braavos before cornering her in her hideout. Arya, however, extinguishes the room's only candle and manages to kill the Waif in the ensuing fight. Arya rips her face off and adds it to the Hall of Faces.
- Thin Man (portrayed by Oengus MacNamara) was a target of the Faceless Men. He sells insurance on merchant chips, agreeing to pay ship captains and owners if they should lose their vassals on sea. He operates at Ragman Harbor in Braavos. The Thin Man scams a variety of his customers, and one of them goes to the Faceless Men. Jaqen H’ghar tasks Arya Stark with studying the man, ad prepares to poison him with an oyster when see spots Meryn Trant.
- Ghita (portrayed by Hattie Gotobed) was a terminally ill child, whose father brought her to the House of Black and White. Arya Stark puts the Ghita out of her misery by giving her poisoned water to drink. Arya later wears Ghita's face and pretends to be a child sex worker to ambush and murder Ser Meryn Trant in a brothel.
- Izembaro (portrayed by Richard E. Grant)
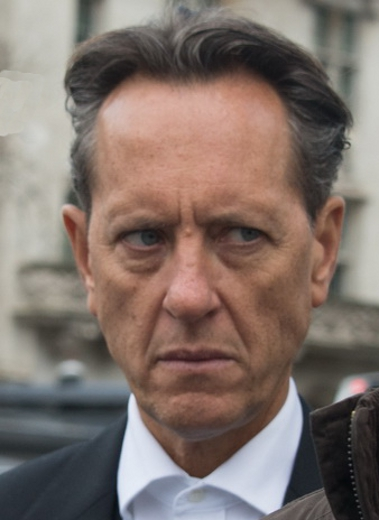
  Richard E. Grant
  is the manager of a Braavosi troupe of actors, in which he also acts. He portrays King Robert Baratheon and Lord Tywin Lannister in the production of The Bloody Hand. He is outwardly dismissive to his actors, and witnesses Arya Stark foil an assassination attempt on one of his actresses, Lady Crane. He subsequently kicks Bianca, the actress who ordered Crane's death, out of the troupe.
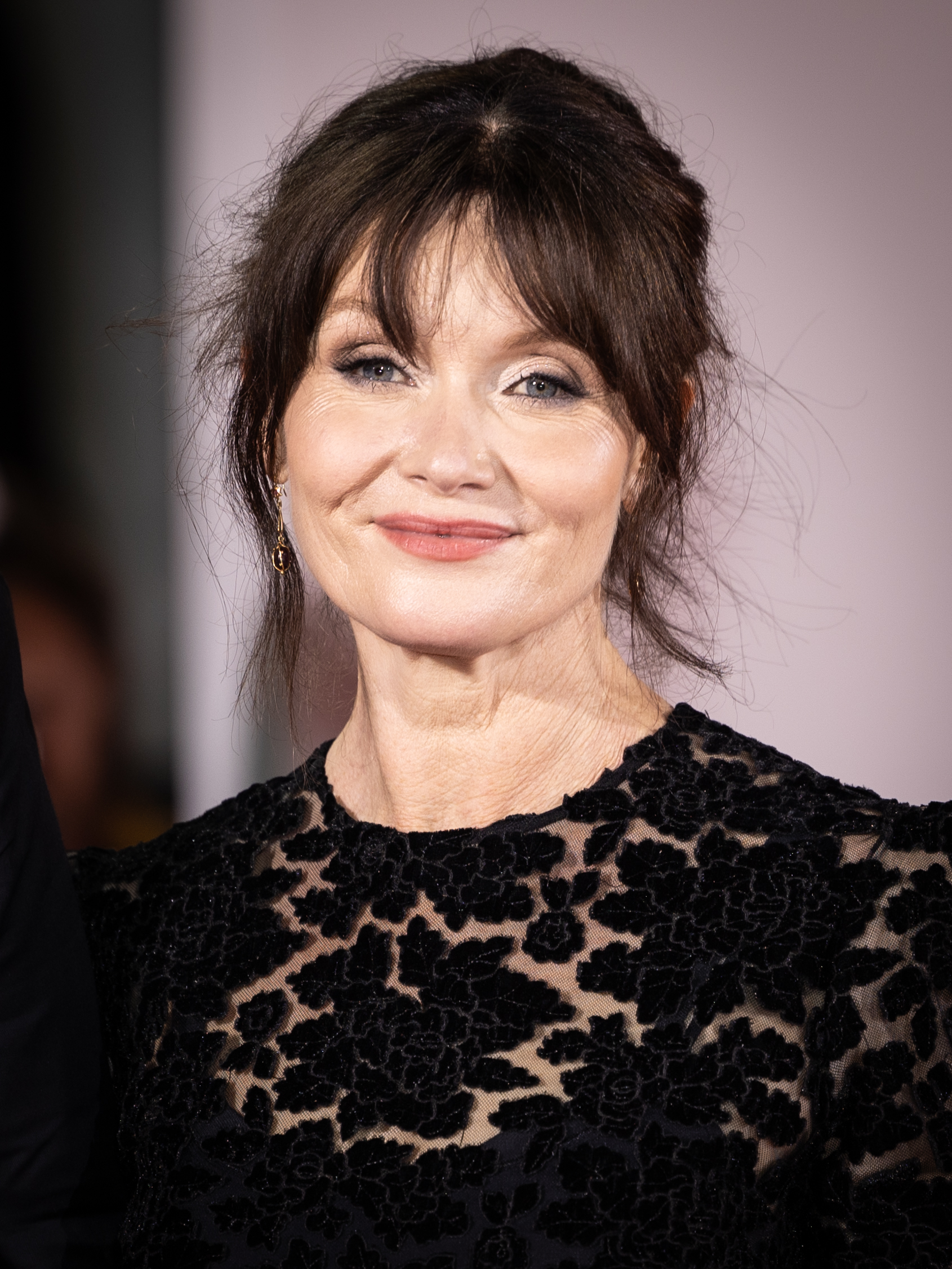
- Essie Davis
  Lady Crane (portrayed by Essie Davis) is the leading actress in Izembaro's Braavosi theater troupe. She portrays Queen Cersei Lannister in the production of The Bloody Hand. She becomes a target of the Faceless Men on the request of her jealous co-star, Bianca. She is almost killed by Arya Stark, who poisons her rum but briefly speaks with her, realizing she is an innocent woman who is a mere victim of someone else's selfishness, and thwarts the assassination, warning her about Bianca. Crane subsequently mutilates Bianca's face and has her expelled from the troupe. Shortly after, she finds Arya severely wounded as retribution for the assassination and cares for her, but is herself killed by the Waif, who was sent to kill Arya.
- Camello (portrayed by Kevin Eldon)
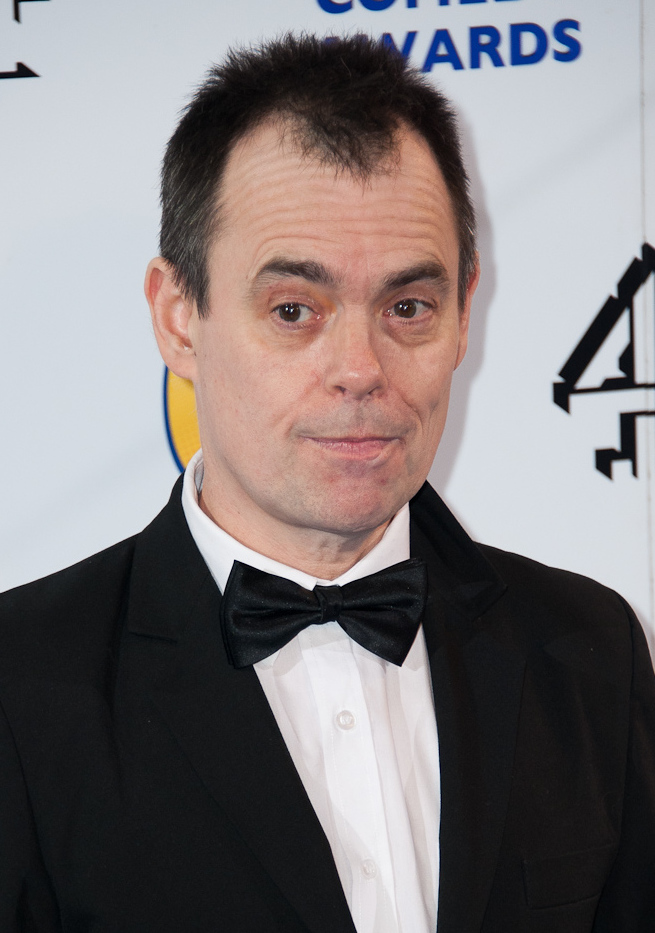
  Kevin Eldon
  is a member of Izembaro's comedic theatre troupe in Braavos. He portrays Eddard Stark in the production of "the Bloody Hand".
- Bobono (portrayed by Leigh Gill) is a member of Izembaro's comedic theatre troupe in Braavos. He portrays Tyrion Lannister in the production of The Bloody Hand.
- Bianca (portrayed by Eline Powell) is a member of Izembaro's comedic theatre troupe in Braavos. She portrays Sansa Stark in the production of The Bloody Hand. Though she is far less skilled than the lead actress, Lady Crane, she is consumed by jealousy and desires to replace her. She contracts the Faceless Men to have her assassinated, but the assassin, Arya Stark, instead warns Lady Crane about Bianca's intentions. Lady Crane subsequently mutilates Bianca's face and Izembaro kicks her out of the troupe.
- Clarenzo (portrayed by Rob Callender) is a member of Izembaro's comedic theatre troupe in Braavos. He portrays Joffrey Baratheon in the production of The Bloody Hand.
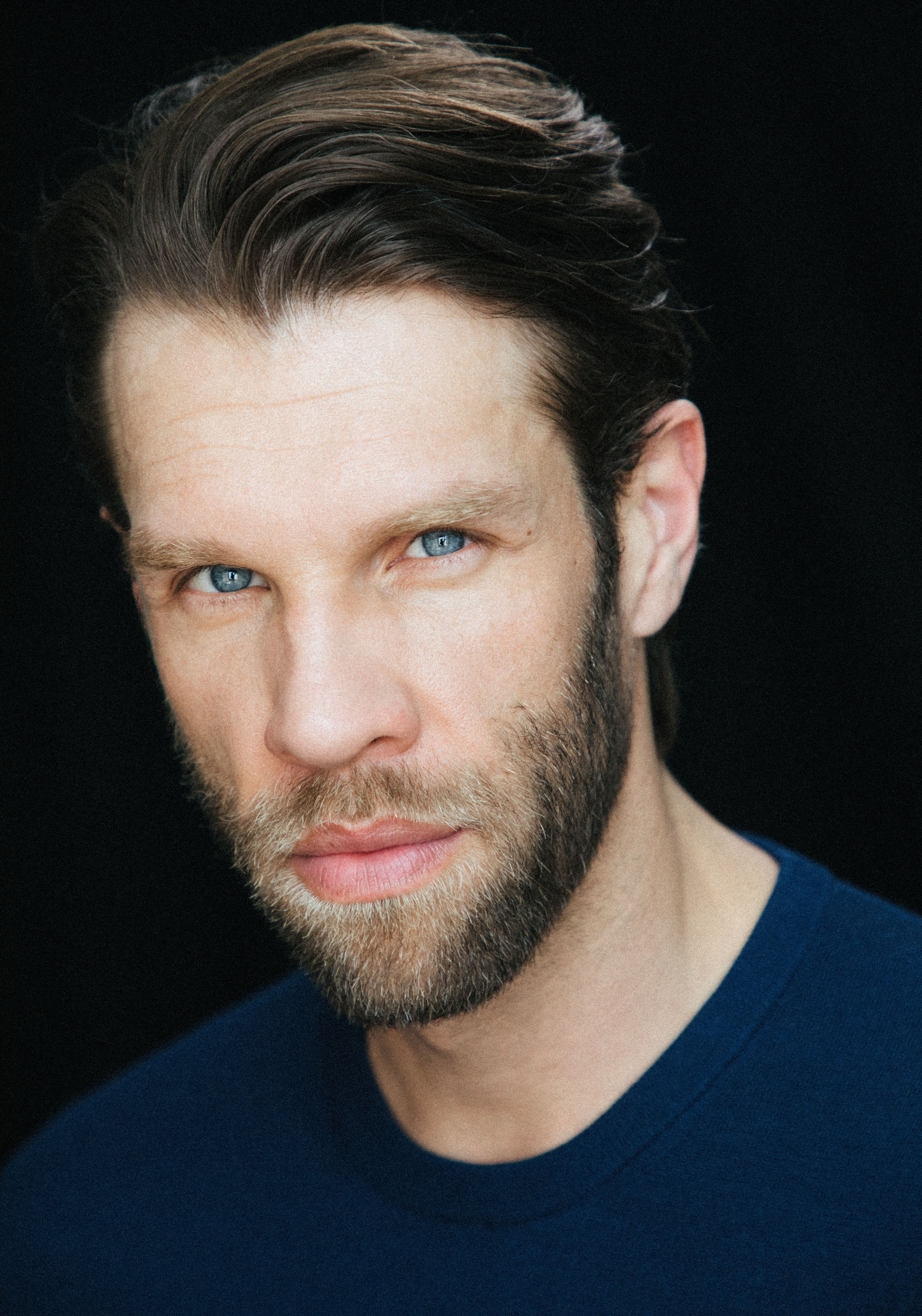
- Marc Rissman
  Harry Strickland (portrayed by Marc Rissman) was a captain of the Golden Company, hired by Cersei Lannister to defend King's Landing. Harry, alongside the company is ferried across the narrow sea by Euron Greyjoy. Upon his arrival in King's Landing, Harry informs Cersei of their lack of elephants. During the Battle of King's Landing, Harry is thrown of his horse by dragonfire and later is impaled by Grey Worm.

=== People of Westeros ===
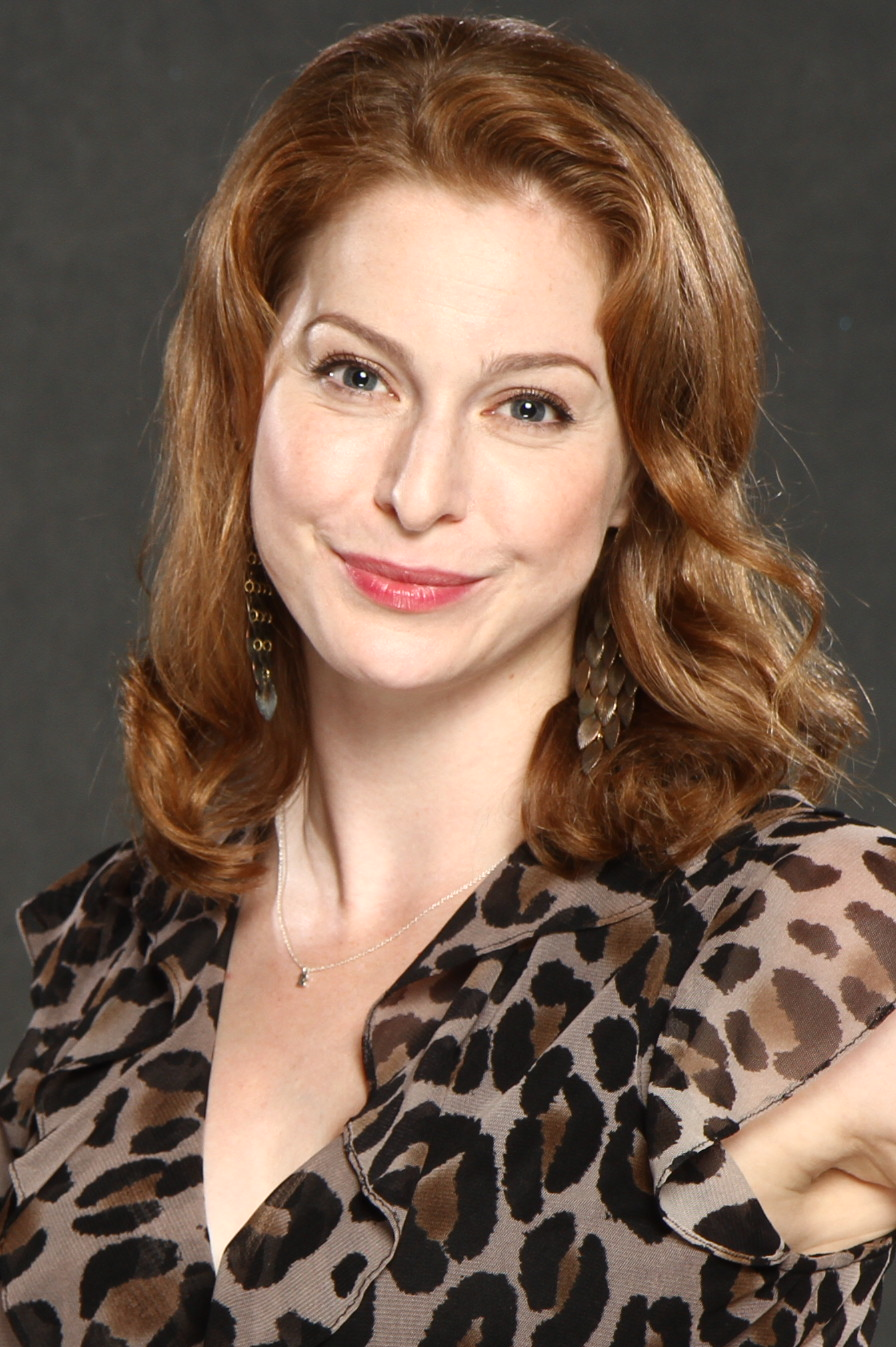
- Esmé Bianco
  Ros (portrayed by Esmé Bianco), is a red-haired sex worker. The Ros of the television adaptation is an amalgam of more than one character from the books, including the unnamed redheaded northern prostitute and Alayaya. She initially lives in a brothel outside the gates of Winterfell, where she is a favorite of Theon Greyjoy, though she has attracted the attention of several others such as Tyrion Lannister and Jon Snow. Later in the season, Ros moves to King's Landing and is given employment in a brothel owned by Littlefinger. At the start of season 2, Ros has been promoted, managing the brothel and interviewing new employees. She is later abused by King Joffrey and savagely beaten by Cersei's men who mistake her for Tyrion's lover. She later enters an alliance with Varys. Her primary function in season 1 appeared to be one of sexposition, as the backstories and motives of Theon, Littlefinger and Pycelle are all revealed during sexual encounters involving her. In season 2, she is used mostly as a familiar face for the audience in several key events. Midway through season 3 she is shot dead by King Joffrey after Littlefinger discovers that she has been spying for Varys.
- Mycah (portrayed by Rhodri Hosking) A butcher's boy who practises sword fighting with Lady Arya Stark. Upon the discovery of the two of them sword fighting, Prince Joffrey Barathoen sadistically berates and abuses Mycah. When Arya attacks Joffrey, Mycah runs away, but is later cut down by Sandor Clegane on Joffrey's order. In season 3, the Brotherhood Without Banners sentences Sandor to trial by combat to Mycah's murder at Arya's behest, which Sandor wins.
- Syrio Forel (portrayed by Miltos Yerolemou)
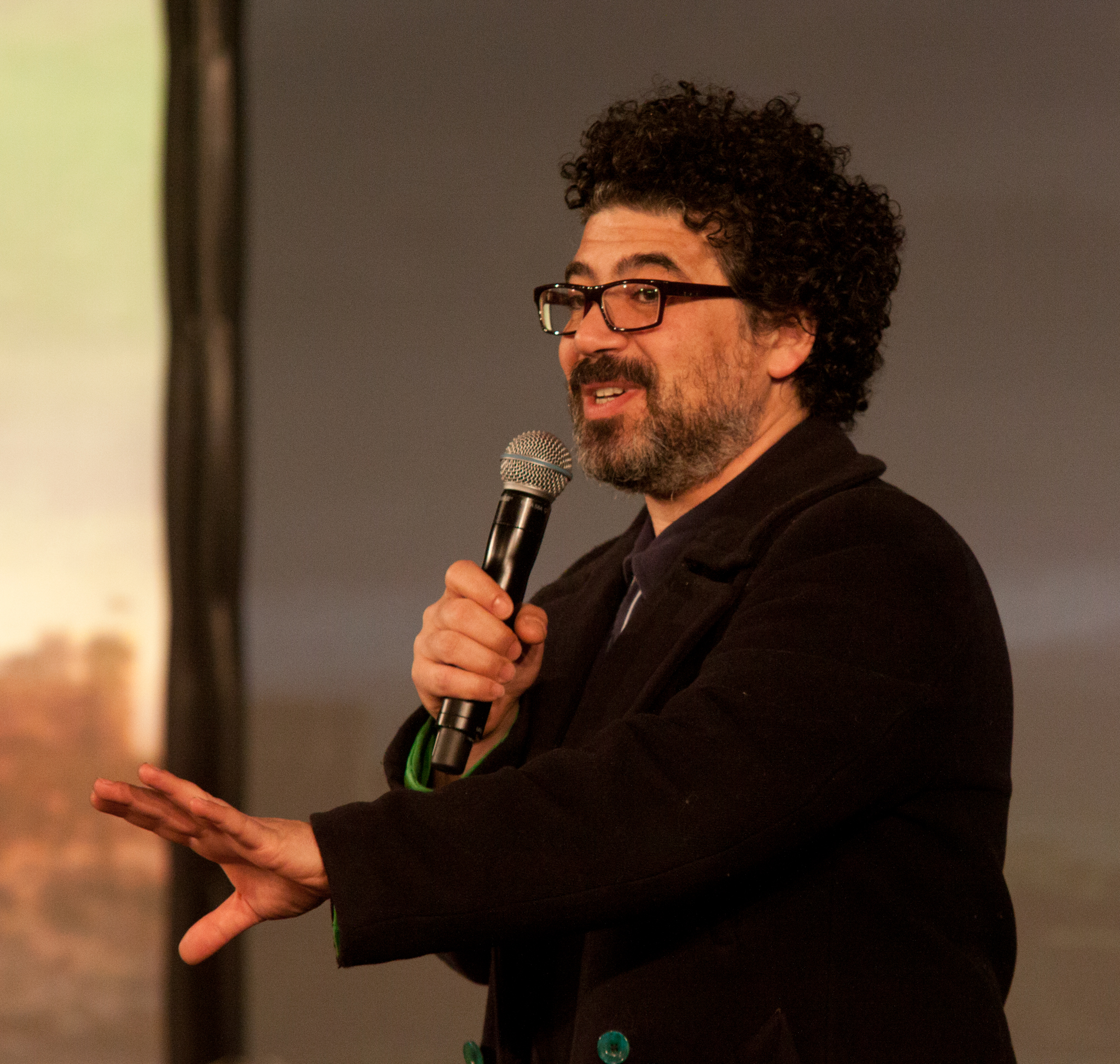
  Miltos Yerolemou
  is the former First Sword of the Sealord of Braavos, hired by Lord Eddard to train Arya Stark at "Water Dancing", the Braavosi style of sword fighting. Syrio trained Arya using wooden swords filled with lead. He also mentored her on how to move and think like a warrior: to be perceptive, move with grace, and command her fear. After Eddard Stark's arrest, Cersei Lannister sends men to capture Arya. Syrio orders Arya to run while he holds them off with only a wooden practice sword. He defeats five guardsmen but cannot bring down the armored Meryn Trant, who cuts his practice sword in half. Arya escapes. The fate of Syrio after that is unknown.
- Tobho Mott (portrayed by Andrew Wilde) A blacksmith in King's Landing, who took Gendry on as an apprentice. When King Joffrey, orders the mass murder of his half siblings, sired by Robert Baratheon, Tobho is forcibly questioned by the Gold Cloaks on Gendry's location.
- Mhaegen (portrayed by Antonia Christophers) is a sex worker, in Littlefinger's brothel, and the mother of the royal bastard Barra, sired by King Robert Baratheon. Eddard visits Mhaegen and Barra, when investigating the murder of Jon Arryn. In season 2, when King Joffrey Baratheon orders the mass murder of his half siblings, Ser Janos Slynt personally kills Barra, after one of his men cannot kill the baby.
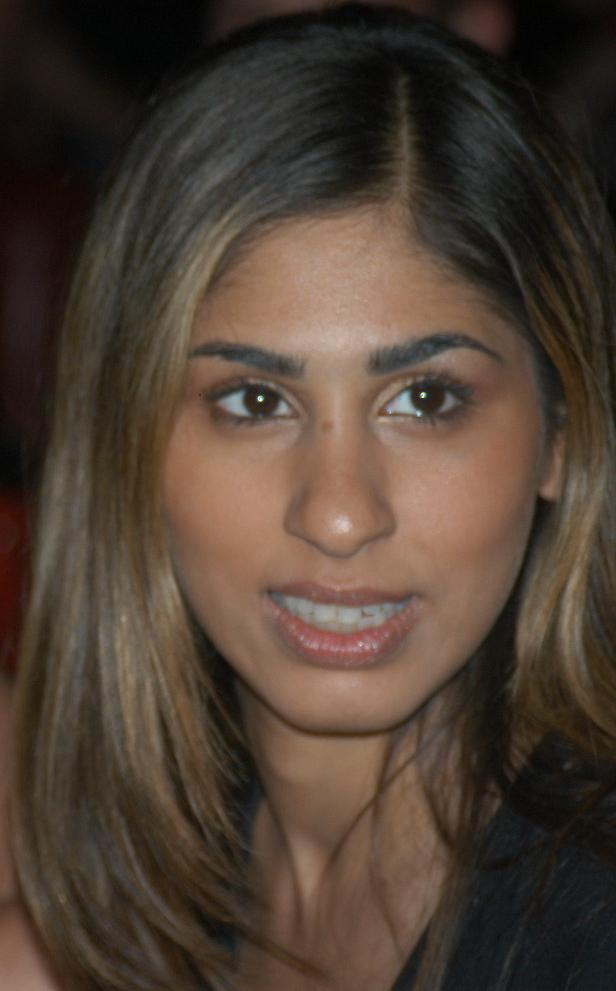
- Sahara Knite
  Armeca (portrayed by Sahara Knite) is a sex worker in Littlefinger's brothel. She is tutored by Ros upon arrival. She feigns lack of knowledge of the common tongue in order to appear more exotic, and entertains Bronn before the Battle of the Blackwater.
- Lommy Greenhands (portrayed by Eros Vlahos)
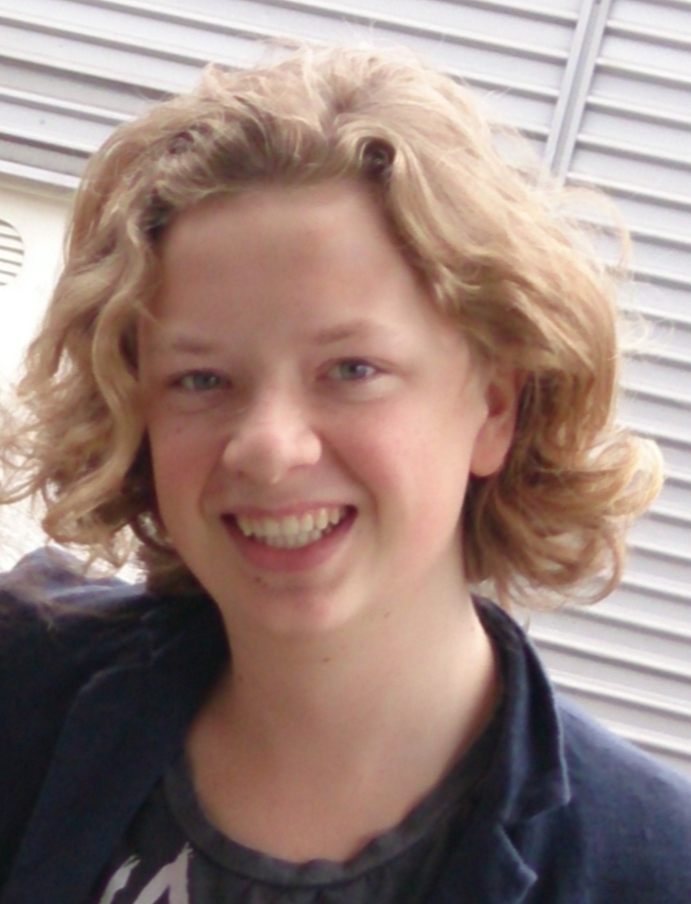
  Eros Vlahos
  is a dyer's apprentice who was caught stealing and sent with Yoren to join the watch. When Yoren's band is attacked by Ser Amory Lorch, Lommy is one of the survivors, though he is injured in the leg, slowing down Arya and the other escapees. They are later captured by soldiers under the command of Ser Gregor Clegane. Polliver kills Lommy when he learns that he cannot walk. When the soldiers ask where Gendry is, Arya tells them that Lommy was Gendry, saving the real Gendry's life.
- Hot Pie (portrayed by Ben Hawkey) is a baker's boy from King's Landing recruited by Yoren to join the Watch. He is shown to be a friend of Lommy and together they try to bully Arya, but, instead she beats him. Hot Pie and Arya survive the attack on Yoren's band by Ser Amory Lorch, along with Gendry and Lommy Greenhands. They are later captured by soldiers of Ser Gregor Clegane, who kill Lommy. Like Arya, Hot Pie is made a servant at Harrenhal, in the kitchens. He escapes Harrenhal with Arya and Gendry and head to Riverrun. On the way, they are captured by the Brotherhood Without Banners, Hot Pie decides to stay at a local Inn to become a cook. In season 4, Hot Pie meets Brienne of Tarth and Podrick Payne on their journey to find Sansa Stark and tells them that Arya is likely still alive. Then when Arya passes through in season 7 he is able to give her the news that Jon Snow has retaken Winterfell.
- Daisy (portrayed by Maisie Dee) is a sex worker in Littlefinger's brothel, from Haystack Hall, in the Stormlands. Dais is tutored by Ros, and witnesses the murder of Barra. Daisy is later abused by Ros, who is being forced to by King Joffrey Baratheon.
- Rorge (portrayed by Andy Beckwith), a violent criminal from King's Landing, is taken from the Black Cells by Yoren to join the Night's Watch, which is customary for criminals. He, with the other criminals Jaqen H'Ghar and Biter, is kept caged in a cart for their journey north to keep from harming the other recruits. When Yoren's band is attacked by Ser Amory Lorch, Arya saves the three men by giving them an axe so that they can break out of their cage, which has been set on fire. The three join the Lannister soldiers for a time. In season 4, Rorge and Biter attack Arya and Sandor to collect the bounty on Sandor Clegane's head, but Biter is killed by Sandor and Rorge by Arya.
- Biter (portrayed by Gerard Jordan), a violent criminal from King's Landing, is a frightening man who hisses instead of speaking, and his teeth have been filed to points. Like Jaqen H'Ghar and Rorge, Biter was collected by Yoren for the Night's Watch. When Yoren's band is attacked by Ser Amory Lorch, Biter and his companions find themselves trapped in the wagon in the middle of a fire, but Arya Stark, throws an axe into the wagon so that they can break free and save themselves. They manage to escape and are later taken into Ser Amory's service, eventually arriving at Harrenhal. In season 4, Rorge and Biter attack Arya and Sandor to collect the bounty on Sandor Clegane's head, but Biter is killed by Sandor and Rorge by Arya.
- Marei (portrayed by Josephine Gillan) is a sex worker in Littlefinger's brothel. She is one prostitutes hired by Tyrion Lannister as a gift to his squire Podrick Payne, for saving his life during the Battle of the Blackwater. In season 4, Marei later entertains Ellaria Sand, the paramour of Oberyn Martell. In season 5, Marei is beaten by the Faith Militant.
- Kayla (portrayed by Pixie Le Knot) is a sex worker in Littlefinger's brothel. She is one of the prostitutes hired by Tyrion Lannister as a gift to his squire Podrick Payne, for saving his life during the Battle of the Blackwater. In season 4, during the wedding of King Joffrey Baratheon and Queen Maragery Tyrell, Kayla is part of the entertainment hired for the wedding.
- Anguy (portrayed by Philip McGinley) is a commoner from the Dornish Marches, a member of the Brotherhood Without Banners. He is called "the Archer".
- Beric Dondarrion (portrayed by David Scott in season 1 and by Richard Dormer from season 3 onwards)
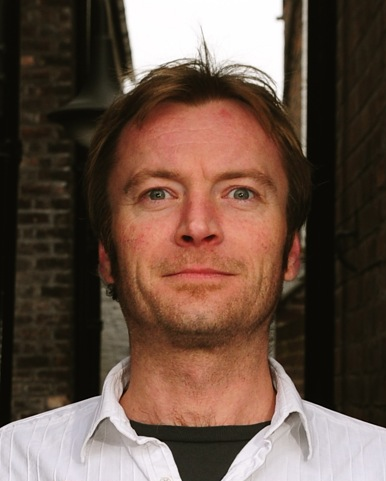
  Richard Dormer
  is the Lord of Blackhaven of the Stormalands, and "the Lightning Lord". In season one, Eddard Stark sends him to arrest Gregor Clegane for terrorizing the Riverlands. After Ned's arrest, he becomes the leader of an outlaw group known as the "Brotherhood without Banners". In season three, it is revealed that Beric has been killed many times but has been resurrected by his friend Thoros of Myr, a red priest. Because of this miracle, Beric and the rest of the Brotherhood convert to the worship of Thoros's god, whom they call the Lord of Light. Beric and the Brotherhood harry the Lannister army, focusing on protecting commoners. They find Arya, Gendry, and Hot Pie and offer them shelter, and at the same time capture Sandor Clegane, who had deserted from the Lannister army during the Battle of the Blackwater. Clegane is sentenced to trial by combat, and Beric is his opponent. Despite setting his sword ablaze, Beric is slain by Clegane, but is resurrected by Thoros, and allows Clegane to go free. Beric later confides to Arya that it is the sixth time he has been revived from death, though he has slowly been losing his memories each time. He later meets Melisandre when she comes to fetch Gendry. Beric gives him away in return for gold, which prompts Arya to run away. Years later, the Brotherhood encounters Clegane again, after hanging three of their rogue members, and convince him to join their cause, since they are heading North to aid Jon Snow against the coming White Walker army. Trying to go around the end of the Wall at Eastwatch, the three are captured by a suspicious Tormund Giantsbane and imprisoned. They later join Jon Snow's raiding party on their mission to capture a wight.
- Thoros of Myr (portrayed by Paul Kaye)
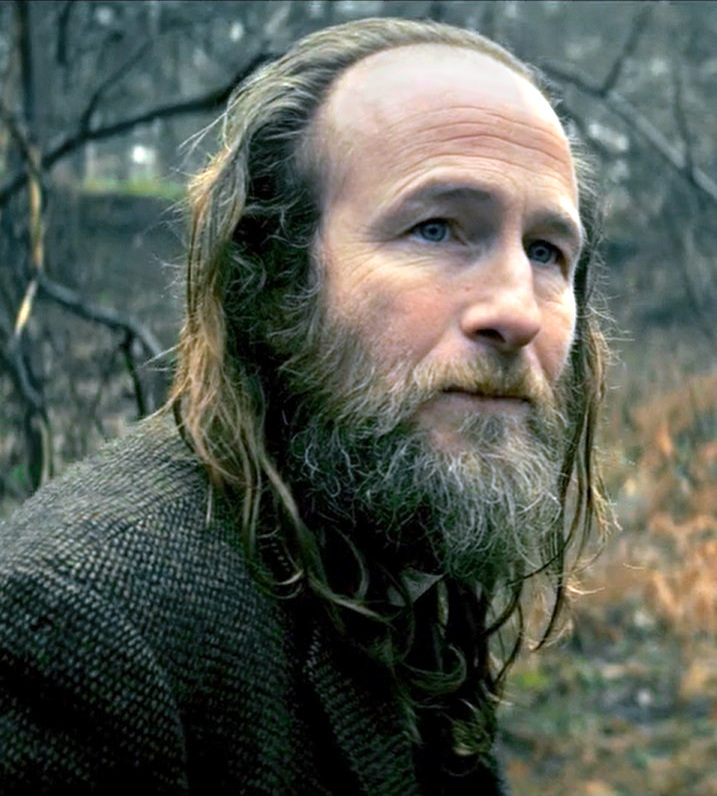
  Paul Kaye
  is a red priest who follows the same religion as Melisandre. He later joins the "Brotherhood Without Banners". Thoros was a famous warrior who fought during the Greyjoy rebellion where he wielded a flaming sword in battle. Thoros was initially sent to Westeros as a missionary, to convince King Robert Baratheon to convert to the worship of the Lord of Light, but he became absorbed in the hedonism of Robert's court, which led him to lose his faith and become a drunkard. Thoros' faith was renewed during the War of Five Kings when he was able to resurrect his friend Beric using what he believed to be a mundane funeral rite. Since then, Thoros has stayed beside Beric, resurrecting him several more times, though at the cost of some of his memories each time. In the sixth season, he and Beric persuade Sandor Clegane to join their cause, since they are heading North to aid Jon Snow against the White Walkers. In the seventh season, trying to go around the end of the Wall at Eastwatch, the three are captured by a suspicious Tormund Giantsbane and imprisoned. They later join Jon Snow's raiding party on their mission to capture a wight, in which Thoros is killed by an undead polar bear.
- Olyvar (portrayed by Will Tudor)
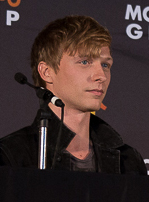
  Will Tudor
  is a spy, sex worker, and brothel manager in the employ of Petyr Baelish. In season 3, he poses as Loras Tyrell's squire and has a one-night stand with him at Baelish's request to learn the Tyrells' true motivations for coming to King's Landing. In season 4, he becomes a lover of Oberyn Martell. In season 5, he continues his affair with Loras. His life is put in danger when the Faith Militant are re-established and they target the city's homosexuals. He escapes due to being fully clothed during the attack and goes into hiding, but he is approached by Cersei and offered immunity from prosecution if he testifies against Loras at his Holy Inquest. Olyvar does so, implicating both Loras and Margaery in the process.
- Septa Unella (portrayed by Hannah Waddingham)
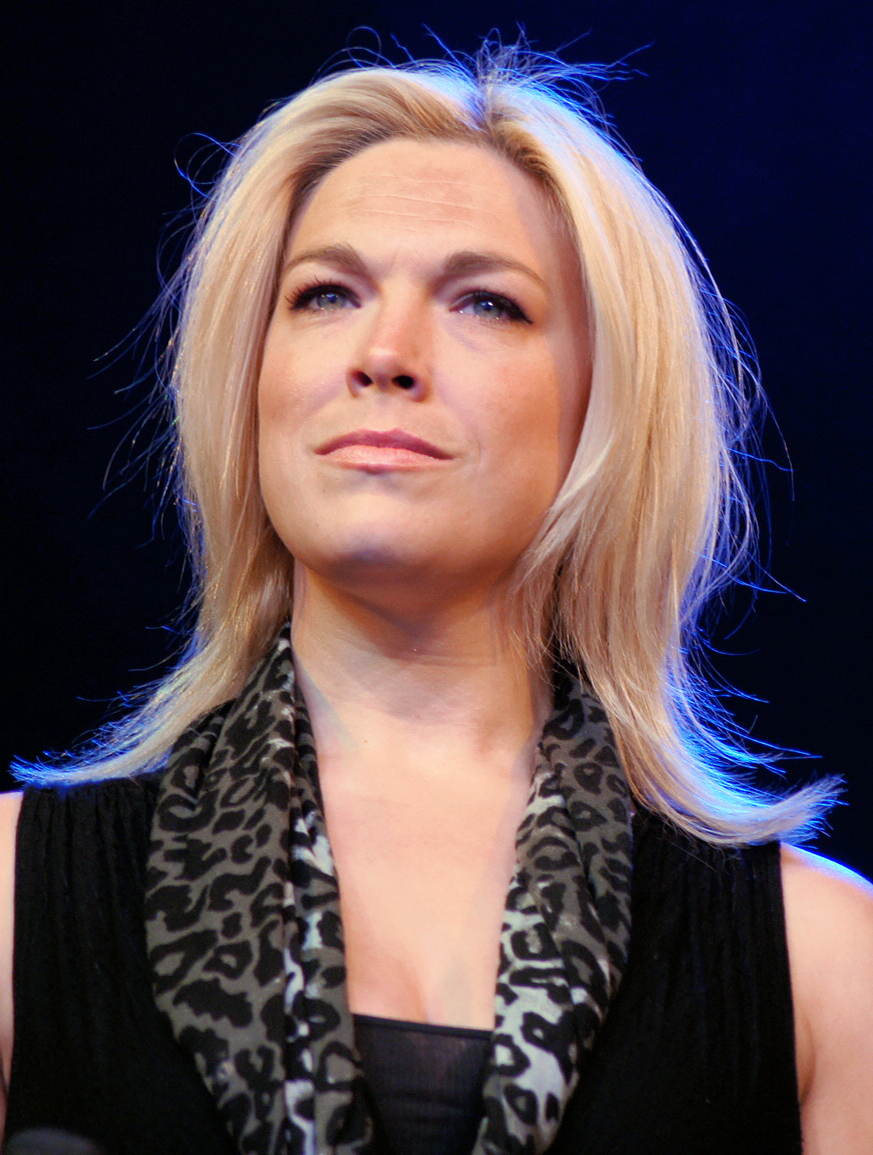
  Hannah Waddingham
  is a Septa of the Faith of the Seven and devoted follower of the High Sparrow. She throws Cersei into a cell beneath the Sept of Baelor and repeatedly commands her to confess her sins. When Cersei finally does, Unella and some septas wash Cersei and cut off most of her hair. During Cersei's walk of atonement, Unella walks behind her, repeatedly ringing a bell and calling out "Shame!" to the crowd. She continues to abuse Margaery until an alliance is made between the Crown and the Faith and follows Margaery around wherever she goes. On the day of Cersei and Loras's trial, however, Unella is captured by Cersei's forces before the Great Sept of Baelor is destroyed, taking the High Sparrow with it, and kept prisoner to be tortured by Gregor Clegane on Cersei's orders as revenge for the needless abuse Unella once inflicted on her.
- Arthur (portrayed by Nathanael Saleh) was one of Varys ‘little birds’, a group of informants and spies, in King's Landing. When Varys leaves, he becomes a spy for Qyburn. Qyburn has killed Arthur's father for abusing him and his mother. Later Arthur lures Lancel Lannister underneath the Great Sept of Baelor, where, taking advantage of the dark, stabs him in the spine and paralyzing him, before Lancel is killed in the wildfire explosion.
- Frances (portrayed by Annette Hannah) was one of Varys ‘little birds’, a group of informants and spies, in King's Landing. When Varys leaves, he becomes a spy for Qyburn. He leads several other little birds in the brutal murder of Grand Maester Pycelle
- Lem Lemoncloak (portrayed by Jóhannes Haukur Jóhannesson) is a member of the Brotherhood without Banners. He leads an attack on Septon Ray's small community, without Beric Dondarrion's consent. He is subsequently sentenced to death and hanged by Sandor Clegane, the only survivor of the attack.
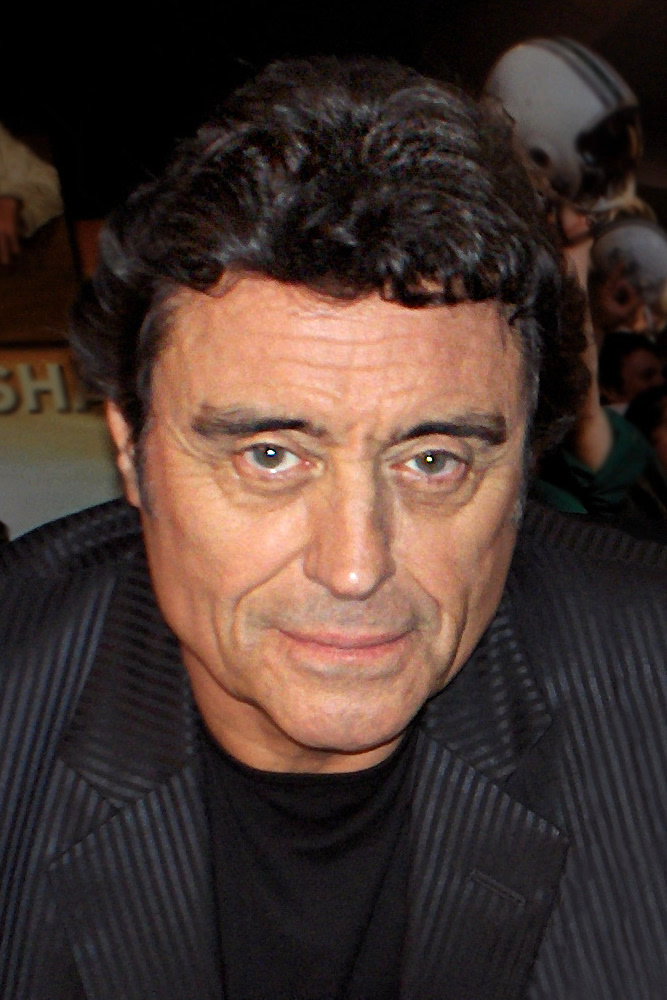
- Ian McShane
  Brother Ray (portrayed by Ian McShane) is a former mercenary who now serves the Faith of the Seven. He tries to build a new community in the Riverlands and saves Sandor Clegane from death following his brutal fight with Brienne of Tarth. He and the rest of the community, however, are killed by rogue members of the Brotherhood Without Banners, and Ray is hanged from the unfinished sept, which drives Sandor to seek revenge, as Ray was his friend.
- Gatins (portrayed by Ricky Champ) is a member of the Brotherhood without Banners. He participates in an attack on Septon Ray's small community, without Beric Dondarrion's consent. Gatins is killed by the Hound, who reprimands him for his choice of last words.
- Morgan (portrayed by Ian Davies) is a member of the Brotherhood without Banners. He participates in an attack on Septon Ray's small community, without Beric Dondarrion's consent. Morgan is killed by the Hound.
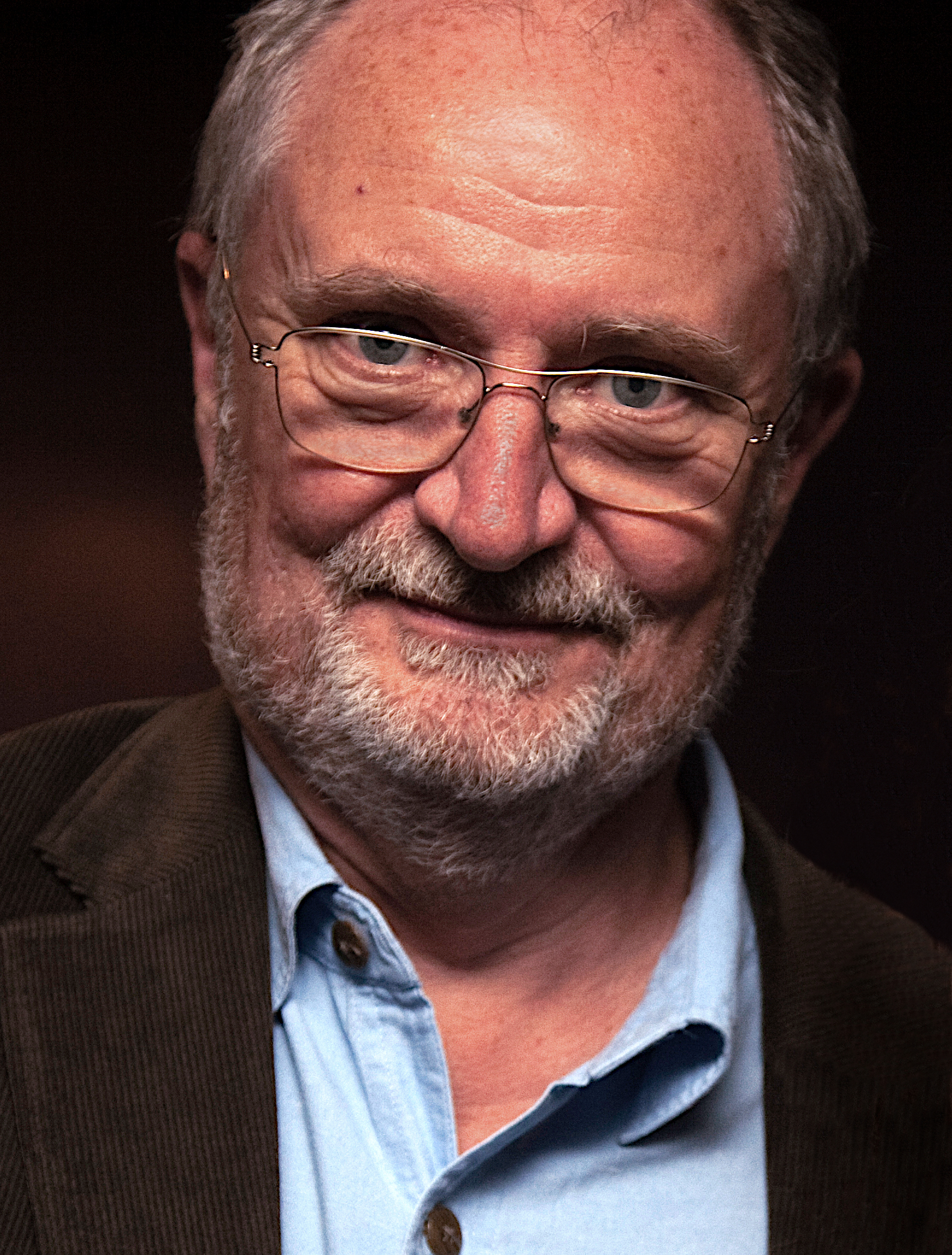
- Jim Broadbent
  Archmaester Ebrose (portrayed by Jim Broadbent) is a governing member of the Order of Maesters at the Citadel. Unlike other Maesters, Ebrose believes Samwell Tarly's claims concerning the White Walkers, but cites that they are not a threat due to the wall. Ebrose attends to Jorah Mormont's greyscale and refuses to provide treatment due to the danger it exhibits, although when Sam cures him, he both reprimands and congratulates him. When a letter from Bran Stark arrives, he states that they will investigate further. In season 8, Ebrose completes writing the history of Westeros since King Robert Baratheon's death, entitled A Song of Ice and Fire, although he omits Tyrion Lannister.
- Martha (portrayed by Bronte Carmichael) is one of Varys ‘little birds’, a group of informants and spies, in Winterfell. During the Battle of Winterfell, Martha remains in the crypts. Martha later works in the kitchens at Dragonstone, and it is suggested that under Varys orders, she is attempting to poison Daenerys.
- Nora (portrayed by Laura Elphinstone) is a resident in King's Landing. During the Battle of King's Landing, she attempts to shield her daughter from the Dothraki and the dragonfire, and are killed, despite Arya Stark's attempts to defend them.

=== Royal court and officials ===
- Ilyn Payne (portrayed by Wilko Johnson)
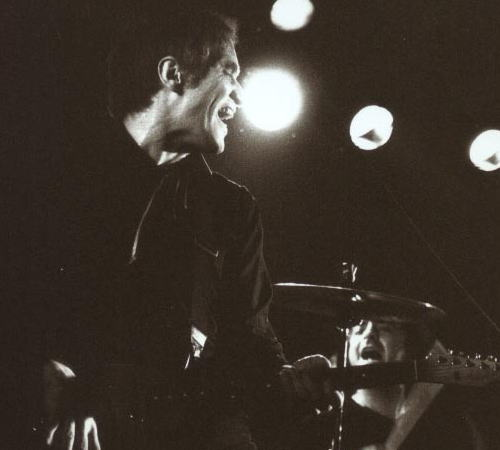
  Wilko Johnson
  is the royal executioner, who lost his tongue for speaking ill of Aerys II during the Mad King's reign. He carries out Joffrey's order to execute Eddard Stark and is temporarily given the Stark family sword, Ice. He is a member of House Payne of the Westerlands.
- Grand Maester Pycelle (portrayed by Julian Glover)
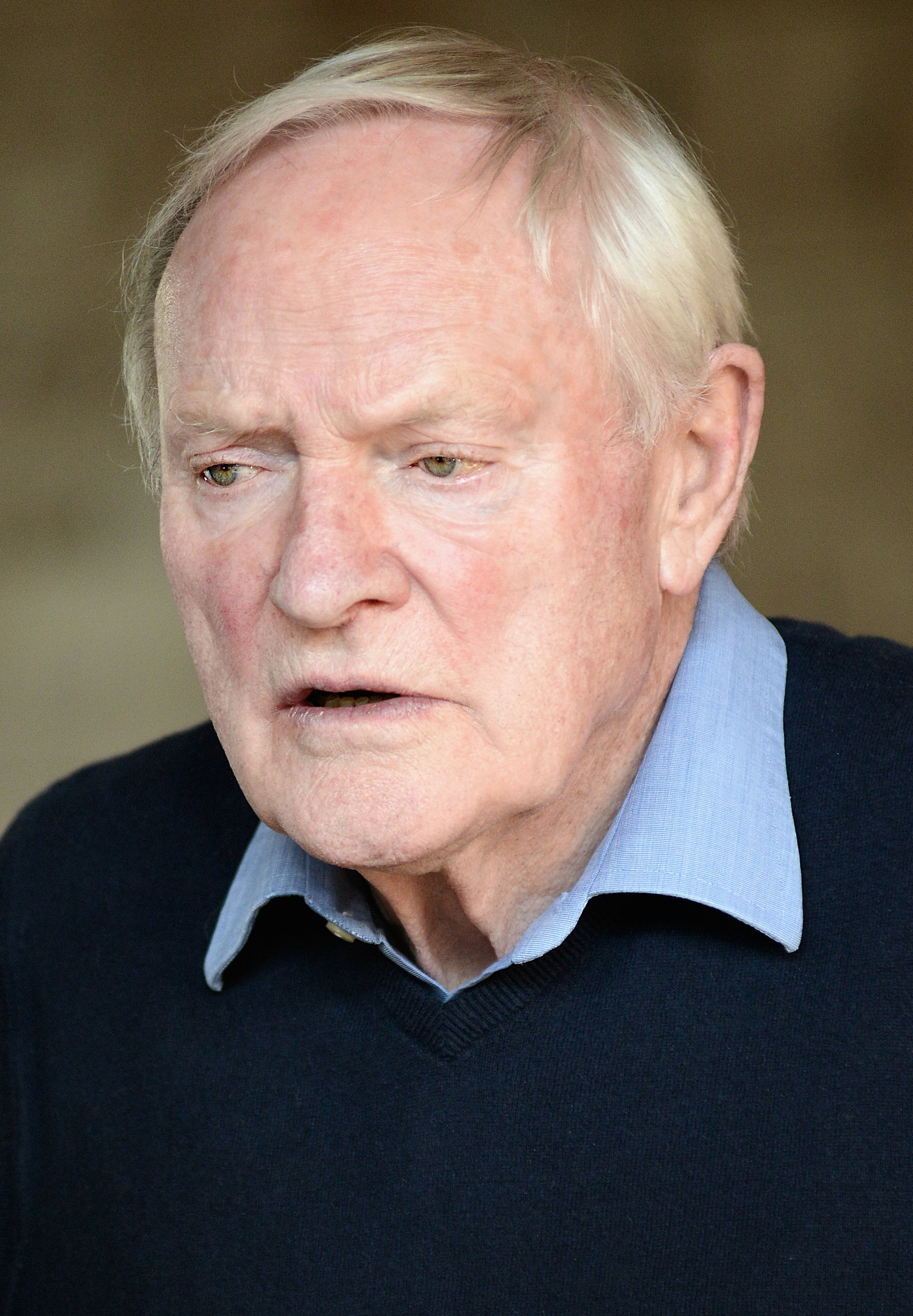
  Julian Glover
  is a Grand Maester of the Seven Kingdoms, is an advisor and member of the Small Council. He had served the previous three kings as Grand Maester before Robert's reign. Pycelle is later revealed to be a spy for the Lannisters, Cersei specifically, and he who informed her of Jon Arryn's investigation of her affair with Jaime. To prevent himself from being undermined, Tyrion has Pycelle arrested and sent to the dungeons, but Cersei frees and Tywin Lannister reinstates him. A deleted scene from season 3 shows that Tywin is not fooled by Pycelle's frail old man guise. In season 4, Pycelle makes false accusations at Tyrion's trial, claiming that Tyrion had stolen poisons from his office to murder Joffrey. Later on, when he proves unable to save the poisoned Gregor Clegane and openly doubts Qyburn's abilities, Cersei orders him to leave, giving his position to Qyburn. He later attends Tywin's funeral and proposes himself as the next Hand of the King, Cersei ignores him and appoints Qyburn as the new Master of Whispers. When Cersei is incarcerated by the Faith Militant, Pycelle summons uncle Kevan from Casterly Rock and gives him the position of Hand of the King. He is present at Cersei's return to the Red Keep after her Walk of Atonement. He continues to be dismissive towards both Cersei and Jaime, acknowledging that Cersei no longer holds any power. On the day of Cersei and Loras's trial, however, he is lured to Qyburn's laboratory by the little birds and stabbed to death, orchestrated by Cersei and Qyburn.
- Meryn Trant (portrayed by Ian Beattie)
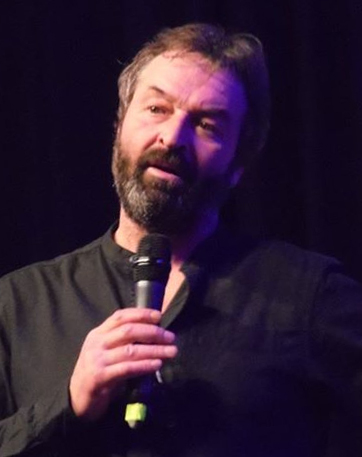
  Ian Beattie
  is an obedient member of the Kingsguard. He is a member of House Trant of Gallowsgrey in the Stormlands. He seems perfectly willing to do whatever Joffrey commands, no matter how vile the order. In season 1, as Eddard Stark is being arrested, he is ordered by Cersei to bring her Arya Stark. Arya's fencing instructor, Syrio Forel, defends Arya from Ser Meryn and is presumably killed. Meryn is present at Tyrion's trial for Joffrey's murder, where he recounts some veiled threats Tyrion had made against Joffrey in season 2, while conveniently omitting that he and Joffrey had been beating Sansa Stark at the time. In season 5, he attends Tywin Lannister's funeral, accompanying Cersei. He is later appointed by the latter to travel as a bodyguard to Mace Tyrell for his meeting with the managers of the Iron Bank of Braavos. In Braavos, he attends a brothel and asks for underage girls. He is ambushed there and killed by Arya.
- Dontos Hollard (portrayed by Tony Way) is a knight serving at the court of King's Landing. He is the last member of House Hollard, following the Defiance of Duskendale. He shows up drunk at a tourney for Joffrey's birthday, so the young king threatens to execute him. Sansa saves his life by suggesting he be made a jester instead. In season 4, Dontos gives Sansa what he says is his mother's necklace as a gift and helps smuggle her out of King's Landing after Joffrey is killed, apparently by Tyrion. Dontos takes her to one of Stannis Baratheon's ships in Blackwater Bay, to Petyr Baelish. Rather than pay Dontos the promised gold, however, Baelish has his men kill Dontos for fear that he will be bribed into talking and reveals that the whole time, Dontos was working for him, and leaves the necklace, which contained the poison used to kill Joffrey, with his corpse to implicate Tyrion.
- Hallyne (portrayed by Roy Dotrice)
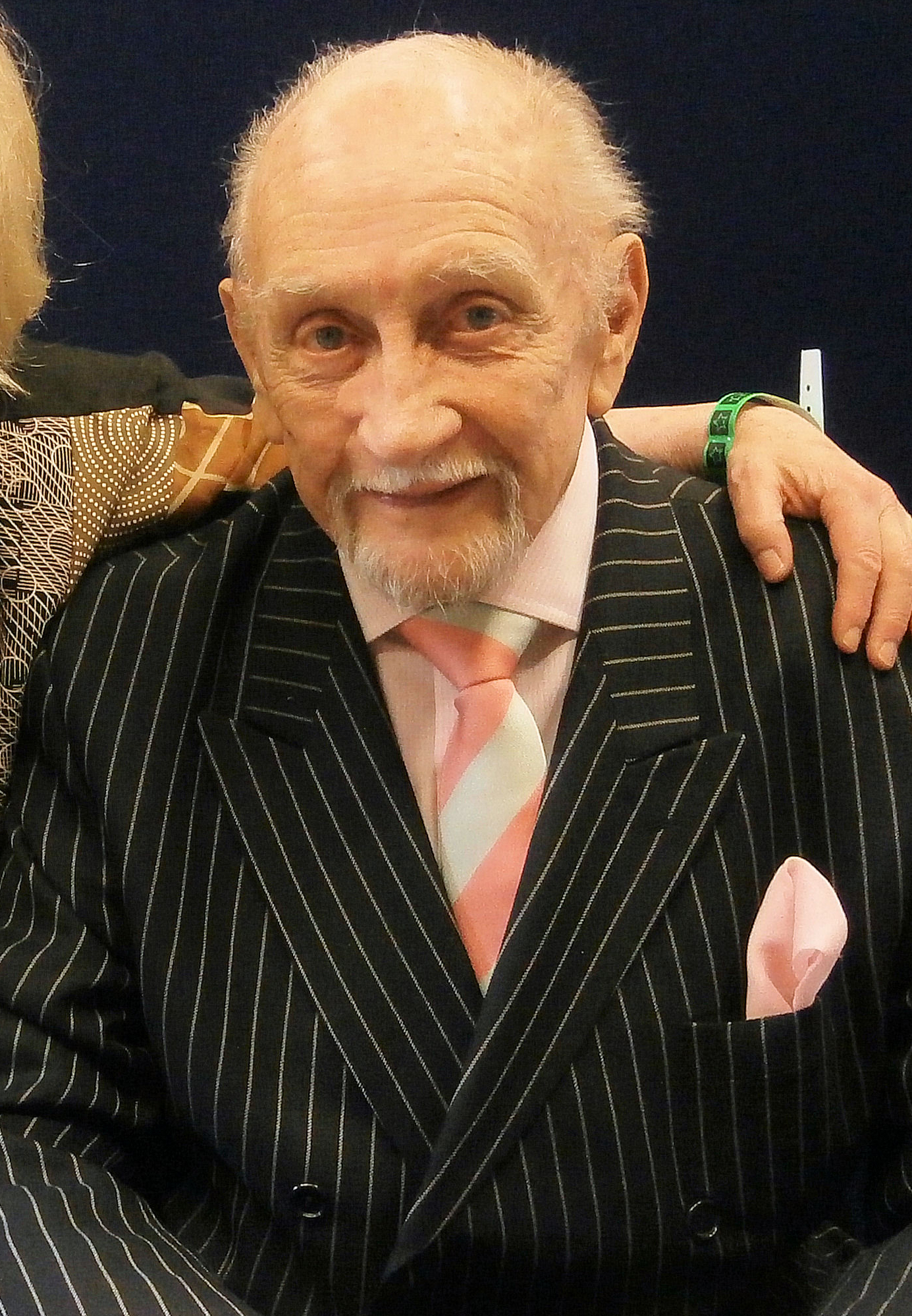
  Roy Dotrice
  is the chief "Wisdom" of the Order of Pyromancers in King's Landing. Pyromancers, whose magical skill is questioned by Bronn and Tyrion, are primarily used to produce wildfire, a very dangerous, highly combustible chemical weapon. Tyrion uses his help for the Battle of Blackwater.
- Mandon Moore (portrayed by James Doran) is a member of King Robert I Baratheon, and later King Joffrey Baratheon's Kingsguard. He is a member of House Moore of the Vale. During the Battle of the Blackwater, he oversees the defenses of the city alongside, acting Hand of the King, Tyrion Lannister. He later, under the speculated orders of Cersei Lannister, attempts to assassinate Tyrion during te battle, permanently scaring him for life, but Mandon is killed by Podrick Payne, Tyrion's squire before Mandon can kill him.
- Qyburn (portrayed by Anton Lesser)
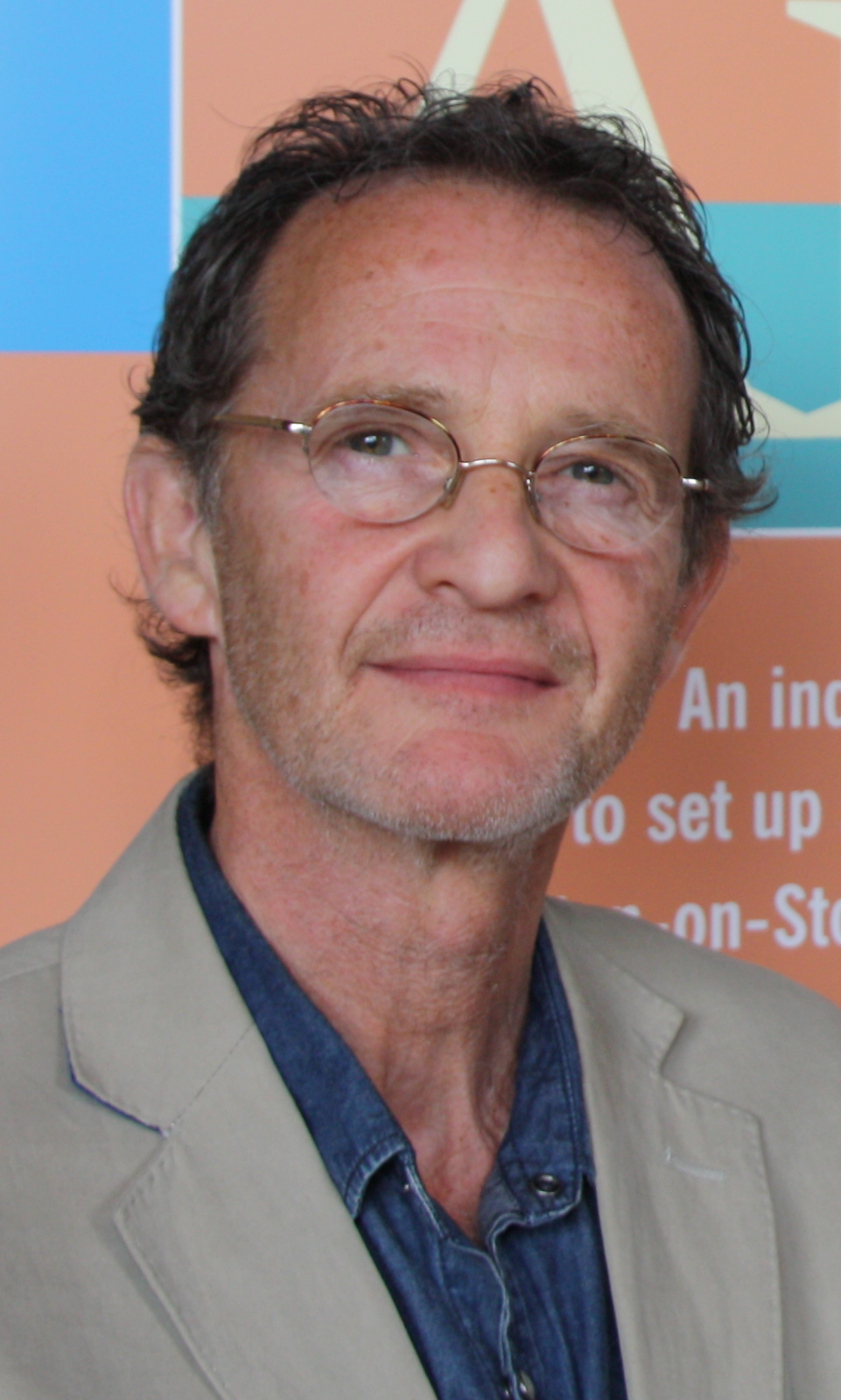
  Anton Lesser
  is an ex-maester who was found by Robb Stark at Harrenhal. He becomes a servant of Roose Bolton. Qyburn lost his title as a maester when he was caught performing human experiments on live patients. Qyburn justifies his actions for the sake of medical knowledge. He tends to Jaime after the latter loses his right hand and travels with him to King's Landing in the hope of having his title restored. In season 4, Qyburn cures Jaime of infection, allowing the skin to heal fully and has a solid gold hand forged for him, earning him Cersei's respect and gratitude. Cersei later enlists his help in curing Gregor Clegane of a deadly poison inflicted on him by Oberyn Martell in the trial by combat. Qyburn warns that his help may "change" Clegane, but when Cersei asks if it will make him weaker, he enthusiastically implies the opposite. After Tywin's death and Varys's treason and escape, Cersei appoints him the new Master of Whispers, much to Grand Maester Pycelle's disapproval. When the Queen mother is imprisoned by the Faith Militant, he is the only one to visit her and informs her of her uncle Kevan's appointment as the new Hand of the King. When Cersei returns to the Red Keep after her Walk of Atonement, Qyburn warmly greets her and presents her the newest member of the Kingsguard, an undead version of Ser Gregor, the results of his experiments. He sways most of Varys's little birds to his service and learns of the caches of wildfire that the Mad King had stored underneath King's Landing. After Cersei removes all of her enemies by destroying the Great Sept of Baelor with everyone inside and later crowning herself Queen, she names Qyburn as her Hand. At the parley in the Dragonpit, while everyone else is terrified by the wight and horrified when it continues to fight after being cut in half, Qyburn is instead fascinated, picking up the dismembered wight's hand and inspecting it as it twitches. In season 8, Qyburn is killed by Ser Gregor, during Daenerys attack on King's Landing.
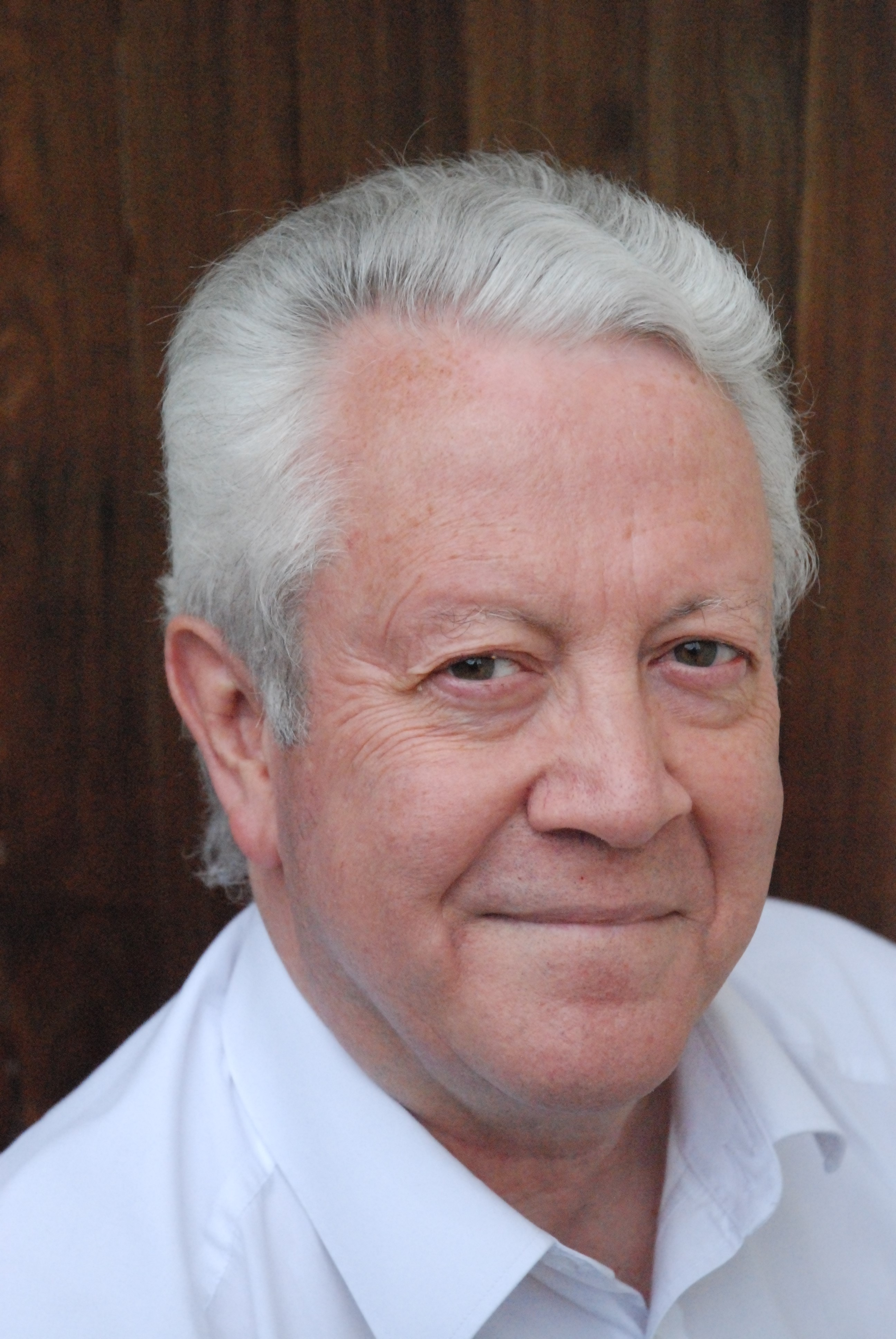
- Paul Bentley
  The High Septon (portrayed by Paul Bentley) is the head of the Faith of the Seven, the dominant organized religion of southern Westeros. This septon becomes High Septon in season three after the death of his predecessor at the hands of the rioting mob in King's Landing. He was the officiant at the wedding ceremony of Tyrion Lannister and Sansa Stark and later at the wedding ceremony of King Joffrey Baratheon and Margaery Tyrell. The High Septon also prepares the body of King Joffrey for his funeral and leads the coronation ceremony of King Tommen Baratheon. He is later present at Tywin's funeral. He is attacked and humiliated by the Sparrows after being found in a brothel. When he tries to make the Small Council help him get revenge against them, Cersei decides to remove him from his position and has him arrested, giving the position to the High Sparrow.

=== Night's Watch ===
- Will (portrayed by Bronson Webb) A ranger of the Night's Watch, who alongside Ser Waymar Royce and Gared investigate reports of wildlings in the Haunted Forest. Will desserts the Wall, after the other members of his ranging party are slaughtered by a White Walker. He is captured, and executed by Lord Eddard Stark.
- Waymar Royce (portrayed by Rob Ostlere) is a knight of House Royce of Runestone, and the son of Lord Yohn Royce of the Vale. Waymar leads a ranging party north of the Wall, consisting of Will and Gare. They investigate reports of wildlings in the Haunted Forest. Waymar is killed by a White Walker
- Gared (portrayed by Dermot Keaney) A member of the Night's Watch. Alongside Ser Waymar Royce and Will, Gared investigates reports of wildlings in the Haunted Forest. Gared is beheaded by a White Walker.
- Benjen Stark (portrayed by Joseph Mawle)
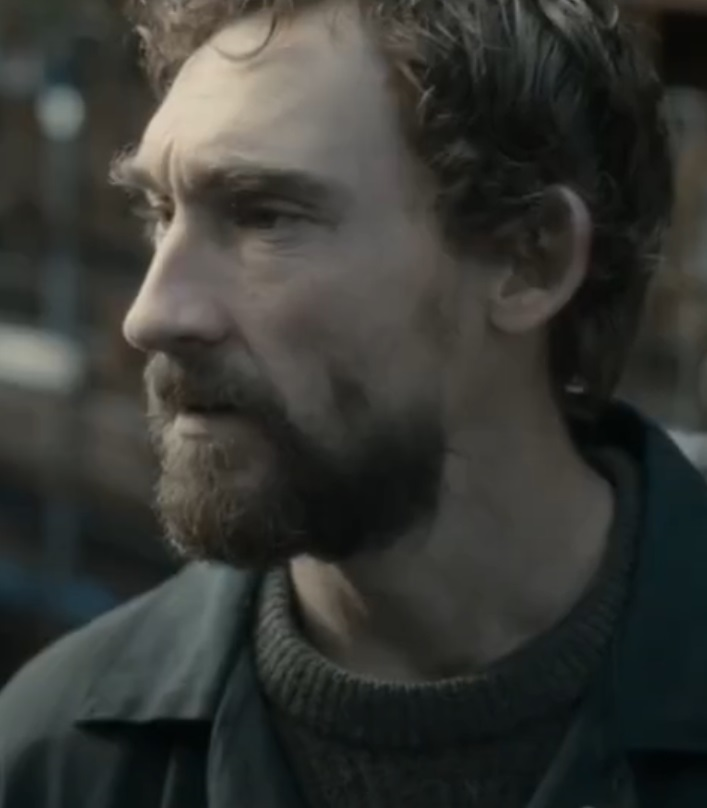
  Joseph Mawle
  is First Ranger of the Night's Watch. He is the younger brother of Lord Eddard Stark of Winterfell. Early in the series, he leads a group of Rangers beyond the wall to investigate increased wildling activity, but does not return and his fate is unknown. In the close of season 5, Alliser appears to Jon to deliver word of Benjen's whereabouts, though this seems to be a mere trick, used to lure Jon to an assassination. Benjen returns in the sixth season to save Bran Stark and Meera Reed from a pack of wights, and reveals that he was stabbed by a White Walker, but then stabbed by a Child of the Forest to stop him turning into a White Walker, a process which left him undead and unable to pass through the Wall. He later takes Bran and Meera back to the Wall and bids them farewell. When Jon Snow is stranded north of the Wall, half-frozen and under attack by wights, Benjen rides in and puts Jon on his horse. Before he is killed he holds off the wights for long enough that Jon can escape.
- Maester Aemon (portrayed by Peter Vaughan) is the blind old Maester of the Night's Watch. He is the great-uncle of Viserys and Daenerys Targaryen. By the time of Robert's Rebellion, he was too old to travel alone and already blind, because of that and of his oaths, he remained at the Wall while his family was killed by Lannister bannermen. He carries the anger of that incident with him into the events of Game of Thrones. In season 1, he names Samwell Tarly his personal steward because of his intellect and love for reading and tries to convince Jon Snow not to desert the Night's Watch after he hears of his father's arrest and his brother's campaign to save him. At the end of Season 3, when Sam and Gilly return after the mutiny at Craster's Keep, he sends all the ravens of the Night's Watch with messages to all the kings and lords of Westeros asking for help defending the Wall. In season 4, he is present at Jon Snow's trial. Aemon immediately ascertains that Jon is telling the truth and has him exonerated, claiming that he learned how to detect liars merely by growing up in King's Landing. Moments before the attack on Castle Black, Aemon speaks with Samwell Tarly about his feelings for Gilly. After the battle, he delivers a eulogy for the fallen before they are burned. In season 5, Aemon oversees the selection of a new Lord Commander. When Jon Snow and Alliser Thorne tie, Aemon breaks the tie by voting for Jon. He later falls ill, and Jon entrusts his care to Sam, who informs him on his great-niece's exploits in Slaver's Bay. Aemon later dies of natural causes after Jon's departure to Hardhome, spending his last moments with Gilly and Sam, the latter delivering a eulogy at his funeral pyre.
- Janos Slynt (portrayed by Dominic Carter) was the Commander of the King's Landing city watch. He was bribed by Littlefinger to conspire against Eddard Stark. He later follows Joffrey's orders to murder all of Robert's illegitimate children. Due to his untrustworthiness and brutality, Tyrion has Janos exiled to the Night's Watch. In season 4, he is shown to be at odds with Jon Snow and suggests that Alliser Thorne get rid of him before he can be elected as the new Lord Commander. During the wildling attack on Castle Black, Janos hides in the food storage closet. In season 5, Slynt appears to support Thorne as the new Lord Commander of the Night's Watch. When Jon is ultimately elected as the new Lord Commander, Janos refuses to obey Jon's orders and insults him. Jon responds by sentencing Janos to death. Janos ultimately breaks down, realising that Jon is not bluffing, and begs for mercy. Jon at first seems to relent, but ultimately delivers the blow, beheading Slynt.
- Grenn (portrayed by Mark Stanley) is a brave but not very bright brother of the Night's Watch who joins at the same time as Jon. He was abandoned by his father when he was a child and had to steal to survive. In season 1, he is initially at odds with Jon Snow, especially after Jon breaks his nose during a training session. Grenn, Pypar and Rast ambush Jon in a shed and threaten to harm him until Tyrion appears and tells them to back off, while advising Jon to sympathise with the other brothers. Jon makes amends by helping to train the others and becomes friends with Grenn. In season 2, Grenn is part of Lord Commander Joer Mormont's ranging mission. When the White Walkers and wights approach, Grenn and Edd make a run for it, accidentally leaving Sam behind. In season 3, he is one of the few remaining survivors of the battle at the Fist of the First men. On the way back to the Wall, Grenn makes amends with Sam by helping him walk along with Edd and Rast, and they manage to retreat to Craster's Keep. He fights against the mutineers after the death of Lord Commander Mormont, tackling Karl Tanner in the process, but he is subdued and chained up. In season 4, he and Edd manage to escape from the keep and make it back to Castle Black, but they later join Jon Snow on his mission to kill the mutineers. He survives the ensuing battle and expresses shock at the sight of Locke's badly snapped neck, wondering aloud what killed him. In the wildling attack on Castle Black, Grenn is ordered by Jon to take five men and hold the castle gates. A giant breaks his way in, and Grenn and the others manage to kill it at the cost of their own lives. His body is later burned by Edd at the funeral.
- Pypar (portrayed by Josef Altin)
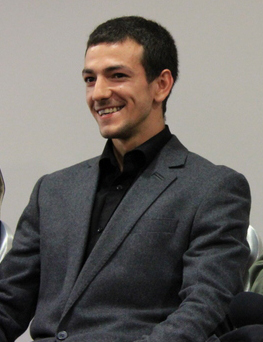
  Josef Altin
  is a brother of the Night's Watch, informally called "Pyp". He joins at the same time as Jon. Initially, he said that his crime was stealing a wheel of cheese to feed his starving sister. Later, he admits to Jon and Sam that he were merely accused of stealing after refusing the sexual advances of his former lord. In the first season, he is at odds with Jon Snow, who does not hide his superior skills from the other brothers, but he becomes friends with him when Jon, on Tyrion Lannister's advice, helps to train the other brothers. He is later assigned to the stewards. In season 4, Pyp participates in the battle against the wildlings at Castle Black with both a sword and a crossbow. He manages to kill one wildling with a crossbow but is himself shot through the neck and killed seconds later by Ygritte and dies in Sam's arms. His body is later burned at the funeral.
- Alliser Thorne (portrayed by Owen Teale)
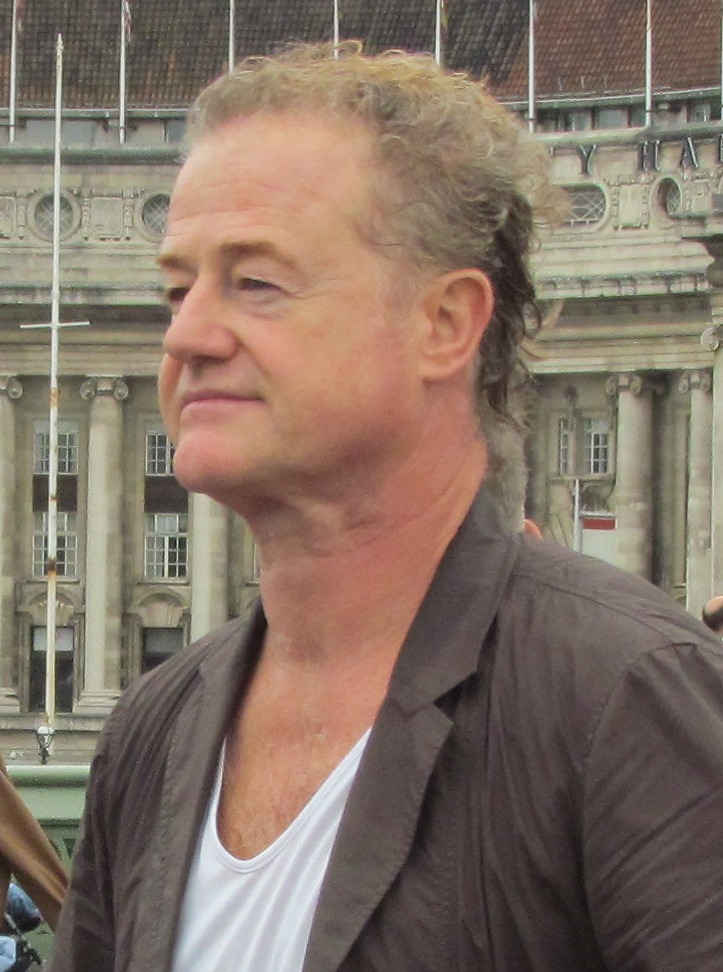
  Owen Teale
  is a drill instructor at Castle Black. He was a member of House Thorne of the Crownlands. He fought for Aerys II during Robert's Rebellion and was sent to the Wall as punishment. He is a bitter, cruel, fanatical and hardened man but knows firsthand what it is like to serve in the Night's Watch during the winter. The previous winter, he was caught north of the Wall on a ranging mission and he and the other members of his party were forced to eat the rangers who died to survive. Thorne returns in season 4, now the acting Lord Commander of the Night's Watch following the death of Jeor Mormont, and becomes friends with Janos Slynt. He advocates Jon's execution for his actions in season 3, but Jon is exonerated by Maester Aemon. Thorne later notices that the people like Jon better than him, and will most likely elect Jon as the new Lord Commander, which would make him Thorne's superior. To avoid this, Thorne, on Slynt's suggestion, allows Jon to lead a mission to kill the Night's Watch mutineers in the hopes that Jon will be killed in battle, though Jon survives. Out of spite, Thorne refuses Jon's proposal to seal off Castle Black to stop the wildlings from breaching. When the wildling army arrives, Alliser grudgingly admits to Jon that he should have listened to him, but valiantly leads his men into battle. Alliser personally duels Tormund Giantsbane, but is wounded. He is last seen being taken inside Castle Black for treatment while yelling for his men to continue fighting. In season 5, he has been healed but walks with a limp. He appears to be the leading contender for being voted the new official Lord Commander of the Night's Watch. Though he ultimately loses to Jon Snow by one vote in a three-way race, he is named First Ranger by Jon, which he appears to appreciate. When Jon sentences Slynt to execution for insubordination, Thorne briefly blocks Eddison Tollett's way, but quickly abandons Slynt to his fate. After Jon's return from Hardhome, he eventually opens the gate for the incoming wildling refugees, showing deep resentment for the new Lord Commander's ambition to forge an alliance with the wildling tribes. After Davos' return to the Wall, Alliser dispatches Olly with word of Benjen Stark's current state; the ploy is soon uncovered as a mutiny, wherein a disarmed Jon is trapped and stabbed to death. Alliser delivers the first blow, under the call "For the Watch!" and leaves the Lord Commander dying in the snow. Thorne assumes command once again, but only until Edd brings back the wildlings to save Jon's loyalists from death. Thorne is arrested for his treachery, and after Jon is resurrected, he is hanged for treason.
- Rast (portrayed by Luke McEwan) was a trainee to the Night's Watch with a particularly mean spirit. He was arrested for rape and chose the Wall as his punishment. In season 1, he is at odds with Jon Snow, who does not hide his superior skills while training, and later threatens him in the armoury with Grenn and Pyp, but he backs off when Tyrion Lannister threatens him. Though Jon later trains him and the other recruits, he does not come to respect Jon and expresses jealousy when Jon is given the sword Longclaw by Lord Commander Jeor Mormont. He takes every opportunity he can to bully Samwell Tarly and only stops when Jon, Grenn and Pyp threaten him. In season 2, he is part of Mormont's expedition North of the Wall to find Benjen Stark, and fights in the Battle at the Fist of the First Men. In season 3, he is one of the few remaining survivors of that battle and is shown to be visibly upset and angry at the loss of his comrades, taking it out on Sam until Mormont intervenes. They manage to retreat to Craster's Keep, but Rast grows increasingly angry and resentful of Craster for mistreating them and the others, particularly when a fellow ranger dies of starvation, which Rast attributes to Craster's stinginess. Rast and Karl Tanner stand up to Craster, resulting in a mutiny in which Karl kills Craster and Rast stabs Mormont in the back for threatening Karl with execution. He and the rest of the mutineers remain at the Keep with Craster's daughter-wives, although Sam manages to escape, to Rast's fury. In season 4, he is visibly uncomfortable with the abuse the mutineers are putting Craster's daughters through, and is himself being abused by Karl, who spitefully orders Rast to feed Jon's direwolf, Ghost, who they have caged outside the Keep. When the mutineers capture Bran Stark and his party, Rast recognises Bran as Jon's brother and taunts Hodor by stabbing him in the leg. Rast later flees from the Keep when Jon leads a band of brothers to kill the mutineers, but he is mauled to death by Ghost, whom Bran had freed.
- Yoren (portrayed by Francis Magee) is a recruiter for the Night's Watch. He travels to King's Landing, where he witnesses Eddard Stark's execution. Discovering Arya Stark in the crowd, Yoren prevents her from seeing her father's beheading and disguises her as a boy to hide her among his Night's Watch recruits and transport her to Winterfell. In the caravan bound for the Wall, Lannister bannerman Ser Amory Lorch demands Yoren hand over a recruit named Gendry. When Yoren refuses, a battle ensues, and Yoren and his men are killed.
- Todder (portrayed by Will O'Connell), also known as 'Toad', is a builder of the Night's Watch. Todder is one of the recruits alongside Jon Snow, and later Todder accompanies Jon to Hardhome, and witnesses the attack of the Army of Dead.
- Eddison Tollett (portrayed by Ben Crompton)
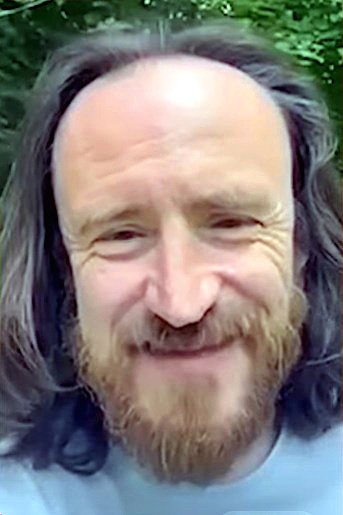
  Ben Crompton
  is a steward of the Night's Watch, known to all as "Dolorous Edd" for his dour face and outlook. He was a member of House Tollett of the Vale. Despite this, he is well-liked by the other Brothers in Black, and has few if any enemies. He is part of the expeditionary force beyond the Wall. In season 3 he is one of the few remaining survivors from the battle at the Fist of the First men and they manage to retreat to Craster's Keep. He fights against the mutineers after the death of Lord Commander Mormont. In season 4, he and Grenn manage to return to Castle Black, but they join Jon Snow on his mission to kill the mutineers. He survives the ensuing battle and is seen dragging Locke's corpse back to Craster's Keep with the other slain Night's Watch brothers. In the wildling attack on Castle Black, Eddison remains atop the Wall on Jon's orders to stop the wildlings from breaching the gate. He sends down flaming oil barrels and ultimately delivers the blow that sends the wildlings retreating by swinging a huge scythe across the Wall, causing the ice to break and sending many falling to their deaths. He lives through the battle and personally burns Grenn's body at the funeral. In season 5, he witnesses Mance Rayder's execution, supports Jon in becoming the new Lord Commander, and drags Janos Slynt into the courtyard when Jon sentences him to die. He begrudgingly agrees to Jon's proposal to rescue the wildlings from Hardhome before the White Walkers can reach them. He accompanies Jon and the Night's Watch to Hardhome and is one of the few who escape the massacre alive. Following Jon's death in a mutiny, he is one of Jon's loyalists who find his body and barricade themselves inside his quarters, refusing to acknowledge Thorne's leadership. Davos Seaworth sends him to fetch Tormund and the wildlings for help, and he succeeds just in time, ordering the mutineers locked up. He witnesses Jon's resurrection by Melisandre, and the mutineers' execution. Jon relinquishes his command to Edd, naming him the new acting Lord Commander. When Jon leaves Castle Black to retake Winterfell from Ramsay Bolton, Edd shares a good-natured farewell with him. In season 7, Edd lets Bran Stark and Meera Reed through the Wall. In season 8, he is killed during the Battle of Winterfell.
- Qhorin Halfhand (portrayed by Simon Armstrong) is an experienced ranger of the Night's Watch and second-in-command at the Shadow Tower. He is called Halfhand because he lost all the fingers on his right hand except his thumb and forefinger to a wildling axe. Because of this, he trained himself to fight left-handed. When Qhorin met up with Lord Commander Mormont at the Fist of the First Men, he advised sending three scouting parties into the mountains to determine what Mance had been looking for there, leading one party, including Jon Snow, personally. After becoming separated from Jon, Qhorin searches for him and is captured and his men are killed. While tied up, he discreetly orders Jon to infiltrate the wildlings as a double agent. Later, he sacrifices himself by provoking Jon into a fight, so Jon can gain the wildlings' trust by killing him.
- Olly (portrayed by Brenock O'Connor)
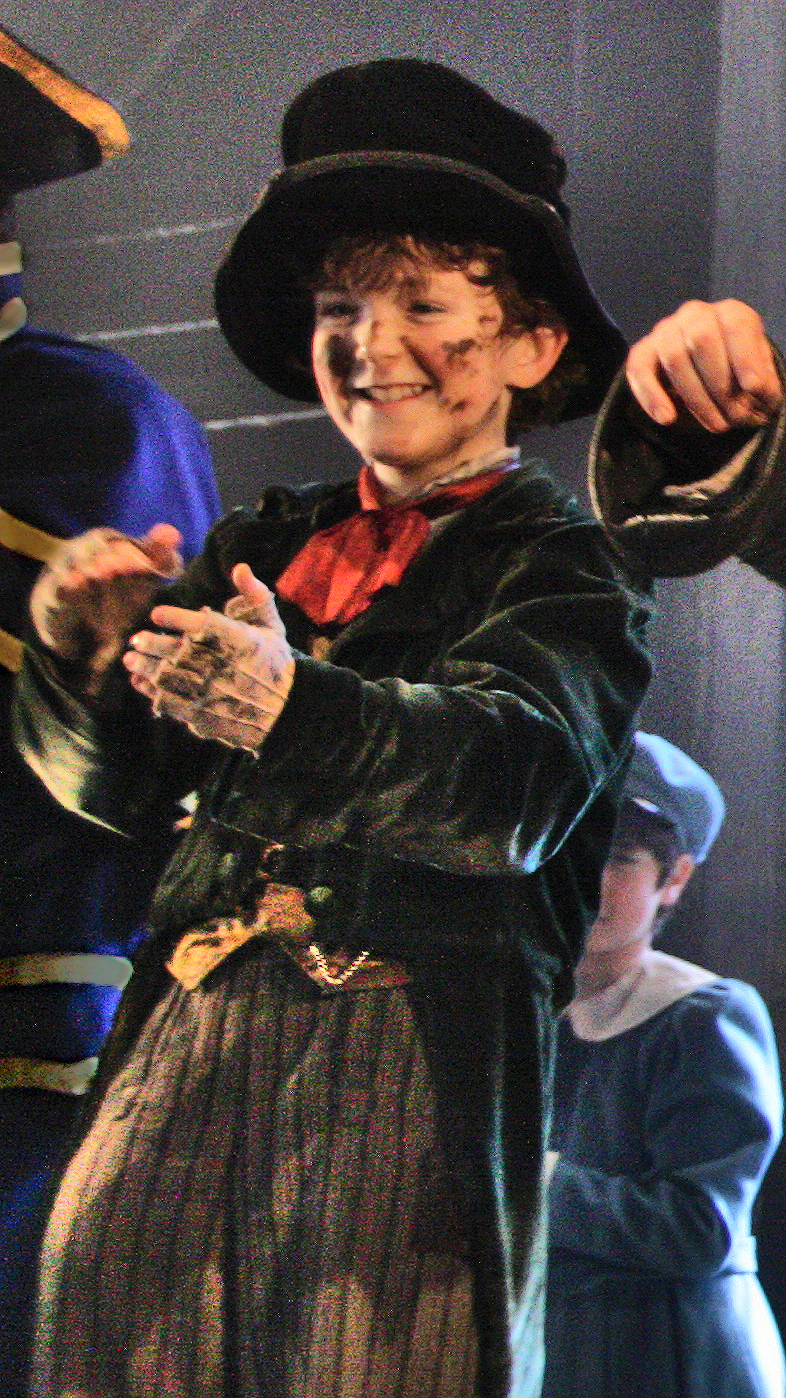
  Brenock O'Connor
  is a young boy who lived with his mother and father in a village in the Gift, the land given to the Night's Watch to support themselves. Their village is attacked by a group of wildlings. His father is killed by Ygritte and his mother by Styr. Styr tells Olly that he is going to eat his dead parents and orders him to tell the men of the Night's Watch at Castle Black in an attempt to draw them out into the open. He then releases Olly, who reaches Castle Black and informs the men of the approaching wildlings, in the process befriending Jon Snow. In the wildling attack on Castle Black, Olly shoots and kills Ygritte from behind in revenge for his father. In season 5, Jon takes Olly as an apprentice, mirroring his own father-son relationship with Jeor Mormont. When Jon is named the new Lord Commander of the Night's Watch, Olly is named Jon's personal steward. He is unhappy with Jon's efforts to help the wildlings and participates in Jon's assassination, stabbing Jon through the heart. When Jon's loyalists and the wildlings rebel, Olly is arrested along with the mutineers, and after Jon's resurrection, he is executed by hanging.
- Bowen Marsh (portrayed by Michael Condron) is First Steward of the Night's Watch, one of the few authority figures left at Castle Black. He was a member of House Marsh of the North. He opposes Jon's proposal to allow the wildlings to pass through the Wall to escape the White Walkers, and later takes part in the mutiny against Jon, being the third to stab him. When Jon is revived by Melisandre, he is executed by hanging.
- Karl Tanner (portrayed by Burn Gorman)
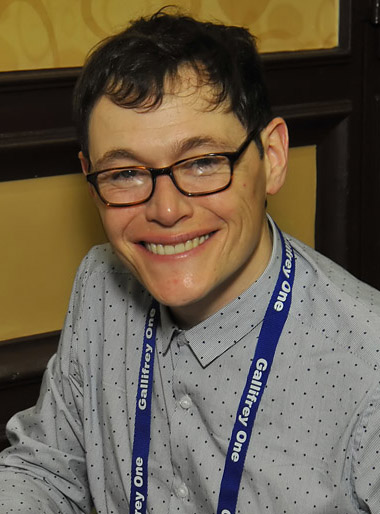
  Burn Gorman
  is a steward of the Night's Watch. In season 3, Karl survives the Battle at the Fist of the First Men and accompanies the survivors back to the Wall, stopping by Craster's Keep along the way, where he eyes Craster's daughters. As tensions between Craster and the brothers of the Watch run higher, particularly after they accuse Craster of starving a fellow ranger to death, Karl challenges Craster and later provokes him into attacking, but he stabs Craster through the mouth and inadvertently triggers a mutiny against Lord Commander Mormont. He is tackled by Grenn, but he subdues him and orders him chained up. In season 4, Karl is still at Craster's Keep, lording over it and raping Craster's daughter-wives. His men eventually catch Bran Stark, Jojen and Meera Reed and Hodor on their quest to find the Three-Eyed Raven and hold them hostage when he learns Bran's identity. Karl later tries to rape Meera, but he is stopped when Jon Snow leads a band of Night's Watch brothers to kill the mutineers. Karl fights Jon alone inside Craster's hut and almost kills him by fighting dirty, but he is stabbed in the back by one of Craster's wives. Karl moves in to kill her, but Jon stabs him through the mouth from behind.
- Denys Mallister (portrayed by J. J. Murphy) is the commander of the Shadow Tower, and former member of House Mallister of Seagard in the Riverlands. During the election for the 998th Lord Commander of the Night's Watch, Denys presents himself as a candidate against Ser Allister Thorne and Jon Snow, but ultimately loses to Jon.

=== Beyond the Wall ===
- Craster (portrayed by Robert Pugh) is a wildling who has an uneasy friendship with the Night's Watch. He is a short-tempered, incestuous polygamist who takes all his daughters as wives. Jon Snow wonders aloud why he has no sons, and it is later revealed that he sacrifices them to the White Walkers soon after birth. As their only ally beyond the Wall, Commander Mormont and the Night's Watch are forced to endure his insults and outrageous demands. Several members of the Night's Watch finally lose their patience with Craster after returning defeated from a battle with the White Walkers when he insults their dead and refuses to share more of his supplies with the hungry rangers. He is killed by Karl, who, with his men, proceeds to raid Craster's supplies and attack his wives and daughters.
- The Lord of Bones (portrayed by Edward Dogliani in seasons 2 and 3 and Ross O'Hennessy in season 5) is a ruthless wildling leader who uses a giant's skull as a helmet and the bones of his victims for armour. In season 2, he captures Jon Snow and in season 3 delivers him to Mance. In season 5 he is beaten to death by Tormud Giantsbane at Hardhome, when he refuses to hear Tormund's proposal for an alliance with the Night's Watch.
- Mance Rayder (portrayed by Ciarán Hinds)
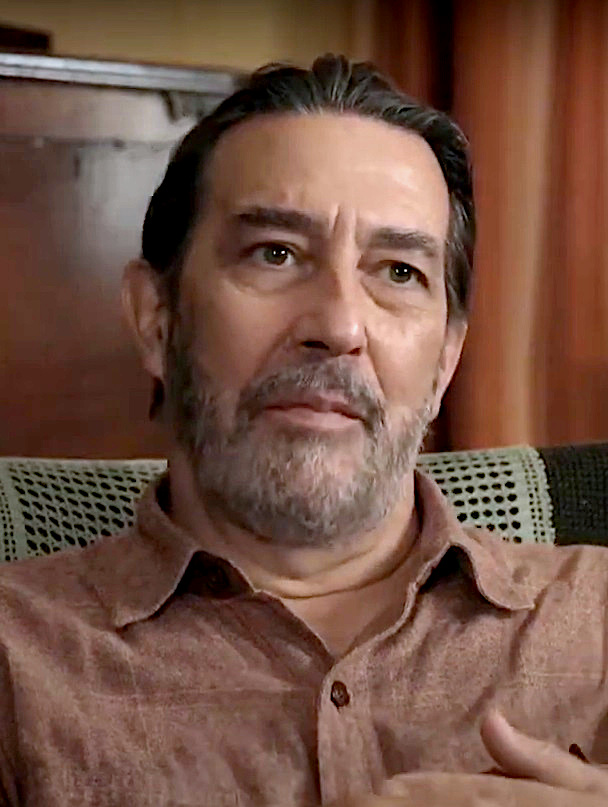
  Ciarán Hinds
  is a former ranger of the Night's Watch who became the "King-Beyond-the-Wall" and the new leader of the Wildlings. He was a wildling child who was raised by the Night's Watch, becoming one of their best rangers but eventually joining the wildlings. Using the training and tactics he learned from the watch, Mance became the seventh King Beyond the Wall, uniting disparate clans by reminding them that the white walkers and other monsters would kill them all. Mance's goal is to get his people to the safety of the other side of the wall before the White Walkers could reach it. He plans a two-pronged attack on Castle Black, sending Tormund and Jon across the wall with a small party and preparing an army on the other side. After the advance attack on Castle Black fails, Jon leaves Castle Black to hunt Mance down on pretence of parleying with him. Mance realises Jon's true intentions and is about to kill him when he and his men are ambushed and defeated by Stannis Baratheon and his army. Mance and Stannis briefly exchange insults when Mance refuses to acknowledge him as the King. Mance is taken prisoner by Stannis. In season 5, Stannis offers to show Mance mercy if he will bend the knee and pledge allegiance to him, but Mance still refuses, fearing that he will lose his people's respect in the process. On Stannis's orders, Mance is burned at the stake by Melisandre, although Jon shoots Mance to cut short his suffering.
- Orell (portrayed by Mackenzie Crook)
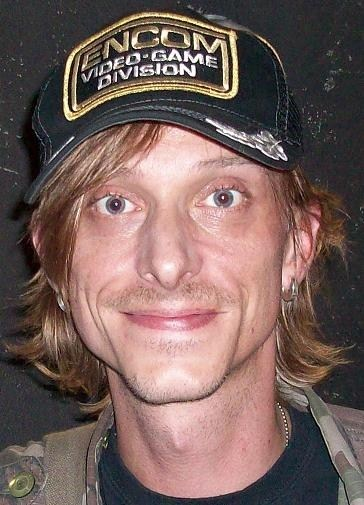
  Mackenzie Crook
  is a wildling raider and warg, a human capable of entering the minds of animals. Orell does not trust Jon, as he suspects that Jon is still loyal to the Night's Watch; he is also jealous of Jon's relationship with Ygritte. Orell's suspicions are confirmed when, during a raid at the North, Jon refuses to kill an innocent horse breeder. Orell claims that Jon always was a "crow" and a battle ensues. After a few moments of sword fighting, Jon shoves his sword into Orell's chest and whispers "You were right the whole time", before pulling it out and leaving Orell to die. Orell wargs into the mind of his eagle with his dying breath and attacks Jon, but Jon fights him off.
- Night King (portrayed by Richard Brake in seasons 4 and 5, and Vladimir "Furdo" Furdik from season 6 to 8)
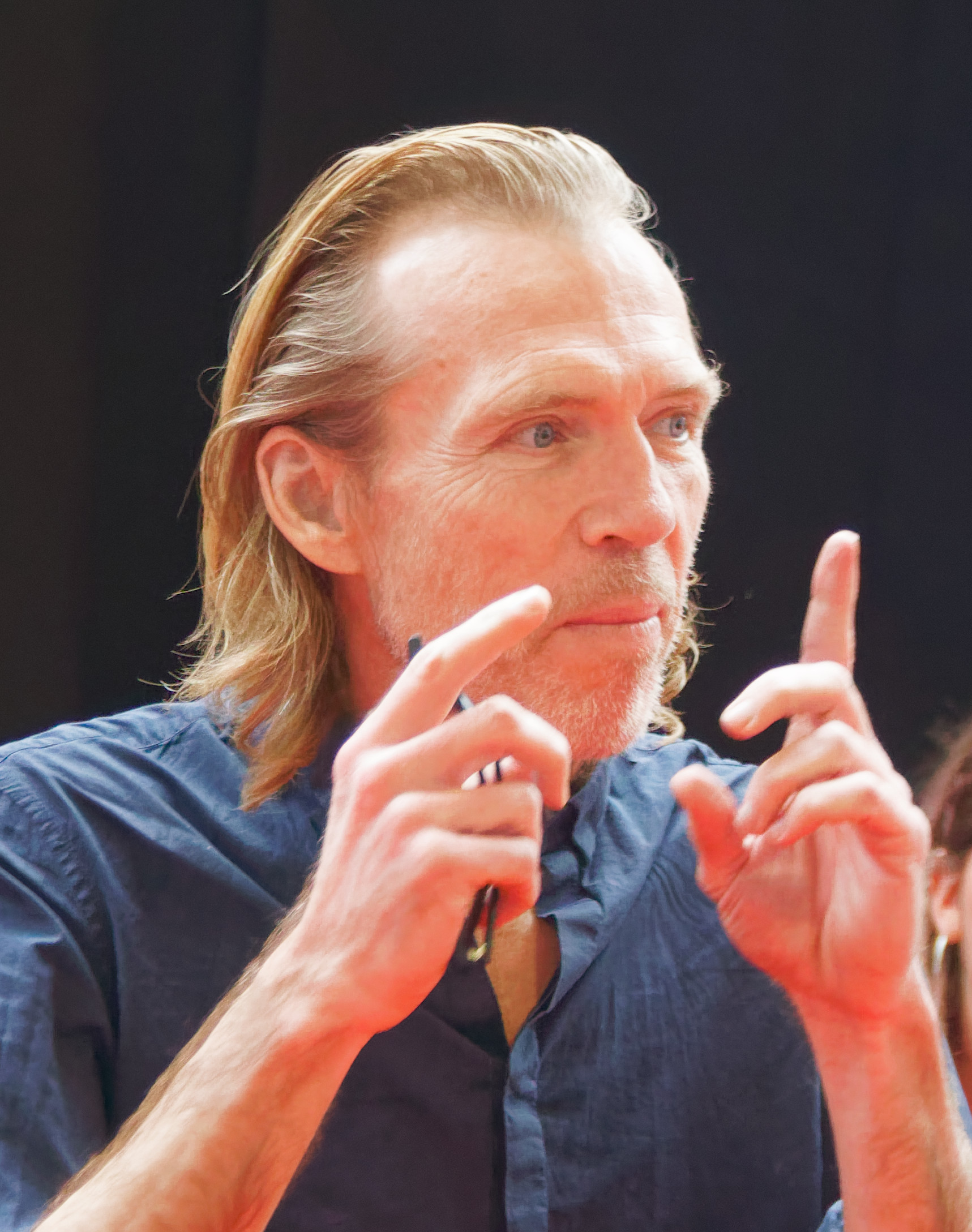
  Richard Brake
  is the leader and first of the White Walkers. He converts Craster's baby sons into White Walkers for his army, and later leads an all-out assault on Hardhome, a wildling settlement. In the ensuing massacre, he witnesses Jon Snow slay one of his lieutenants. In the aftermath, the Night King revives all of the fallen as wights for his army. In season 6, it is revealed through a vision by Bran Stark that the Night King was once of the First Men, the first humans to migrate to Westeros. However, during their wars with the Children of the Forest, the man was kidnapped and forcibly and painfully converted into the first White Walker. The Children intended to use them as weapons against the First Men; however, under the Night King's leadership, the White Walkers have since gone rogue. The Night King later leads an assault at the cave of the Three-Eyed Raven after breaking its magical seal, where he personally kills the Three-Eyed Raven. In season 7, the Night King throws a spear of ice which kills Daenerys' dragon Viserion. He touches the dragon and turns it into a wight. When his army reaches the Wall, he rides on Viserion's back as the dragon's blue fire destroys the Wall. He is killed by Arya with a Valyrian blade (the same blade originally owned by Littlefinger and previously used on the failed assassination attempt of Bran Stark's life) at the Battle of Winterfell.
- Styr (portrayed by Yuri Kolokolnikov)
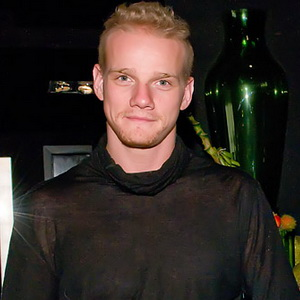
  Yuri Kolokolnikov
  One of Mance Rayder's lieutenants and the leader of the Thenn people, a clan of cannibalistic wildlings. In the battle for Castle Black, he is killed by Jon Snow, who smashes his head in with a hammer.
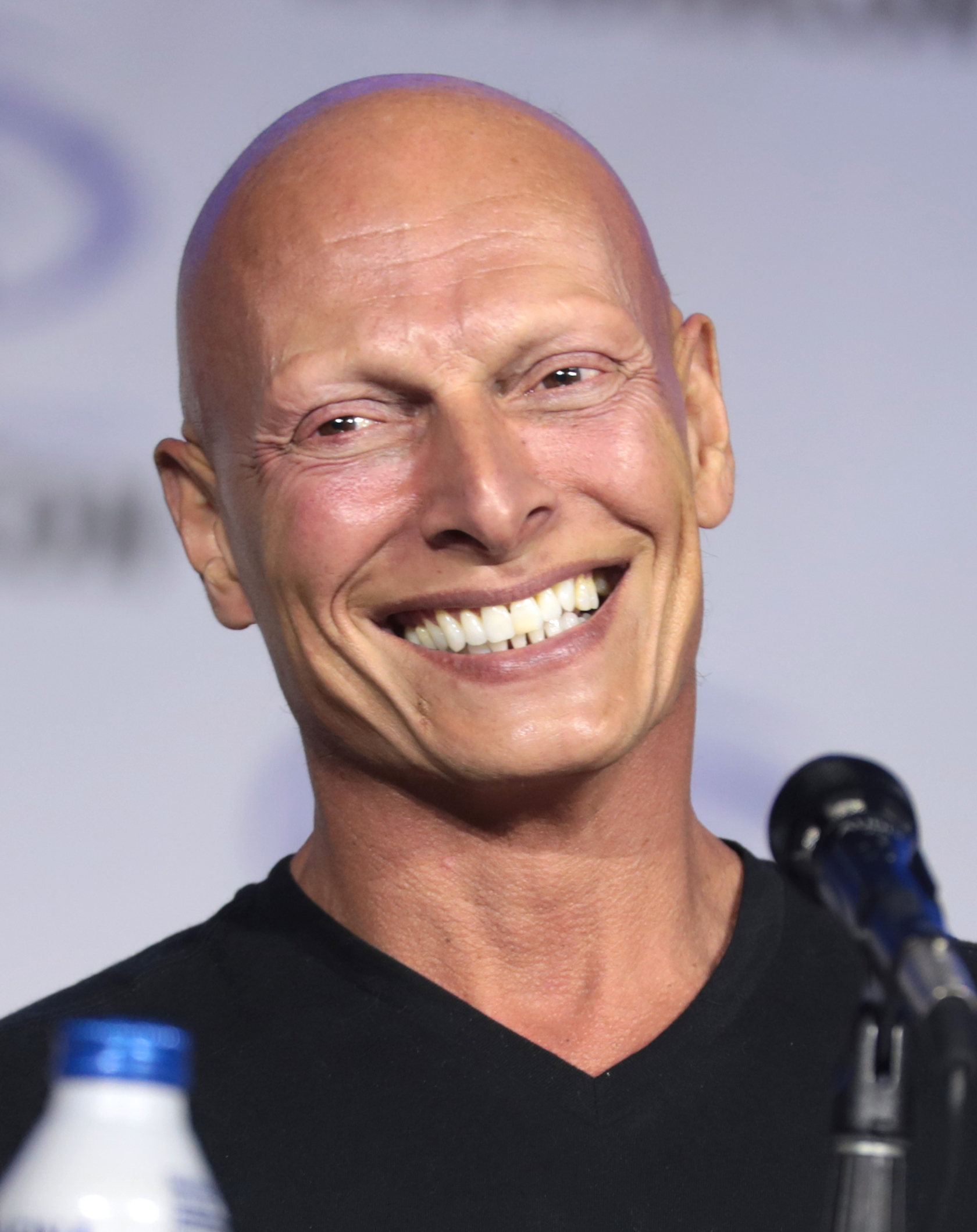
- Joseph Gatt
  Thenn warg (portrayed by Joseph Gatt) is a wildling scout under the command of Styr. He is killed by Samwell Tarly via a crossbow bolt to the head during the battle of Castle Black.
- Morag (portrayed by Deirdre Monaghan) was one of the many wives of Craster. After the mutiny at Craster's Keep, Morag becomes a servant to the mutinous led by Karl Tanner. Morag informs Karl that Craster's last son must be given to the White Walkers. After a group of the Night's Watch raid Craster's Keep, and kill the mutineers, Morag refuses the protection of the Watch and requests the Craster's Keep be burned.
- Sissy (portrayed by Jane McGrath) is one of the many daughter wives of Craster. After the mutiny at Craster's Keep, Sissy becomes a servant to the mutinous led by Karl Tanner, who personally beats her. During the Night's Watch's attack on Craster's Keep, Sissy stabs Karl in the back.
- Three-Eyed Raven (portrayed by Struan Rodger in season 4, and Max von Sydow in season 6)
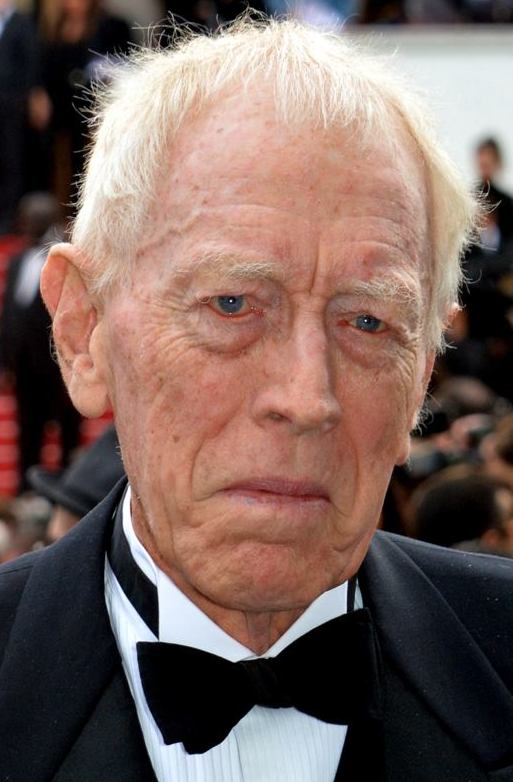
  Max von Sydow
  is a figure who appears in Bran Stark's dreams, following his fall and injury. In Bran's dreams, the raven appears to be trying to lead him into the Stark family crypt, predicting his father's death. In season 3 he keeps appearing in Bran's dreams and wants him to follow him. In season 4, Bran finally finds him, in the form of a wise old man, who promises to help Bran learn to fly. In season 6, he trains Bran in greensight and shows him visions of the past. When the Night King marks Bran during a vision gone wrong, he sacrifices himself to allow Bran and Meera to escape. In House of the Dragon, he is portrayed by Joshua Ben-Tovim.
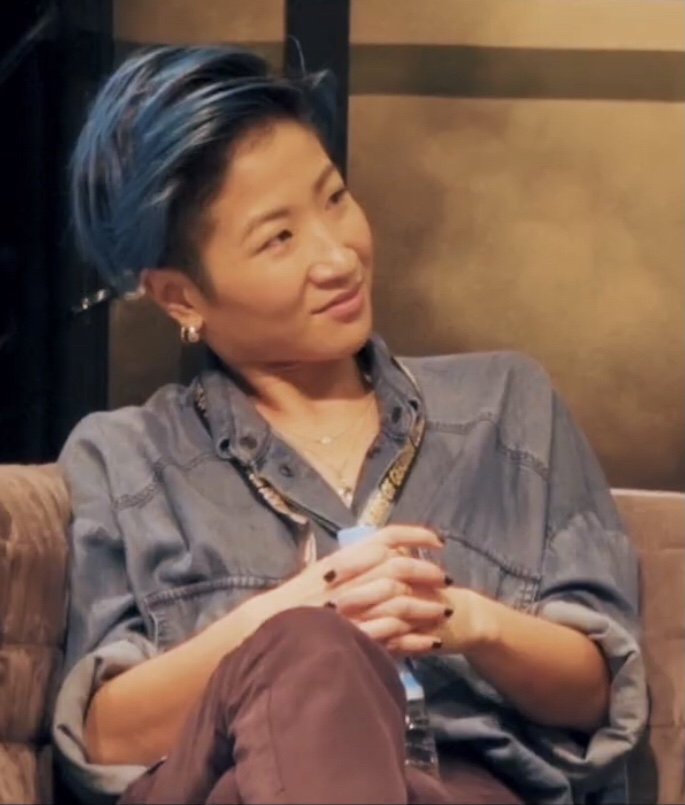
- Kae Alexander
  Leaf (portrayed by Octavia Alexandru in season 4, and Kae Alexander in season 6) appears to rescue Bran, Meera and Hodor from the reanimated skeletons outside the Three-Eyed Raven's cave and takes them to the Three-Eyed Raven herself. When the Night King attacks with his army, she is killed in the ensuing battle.
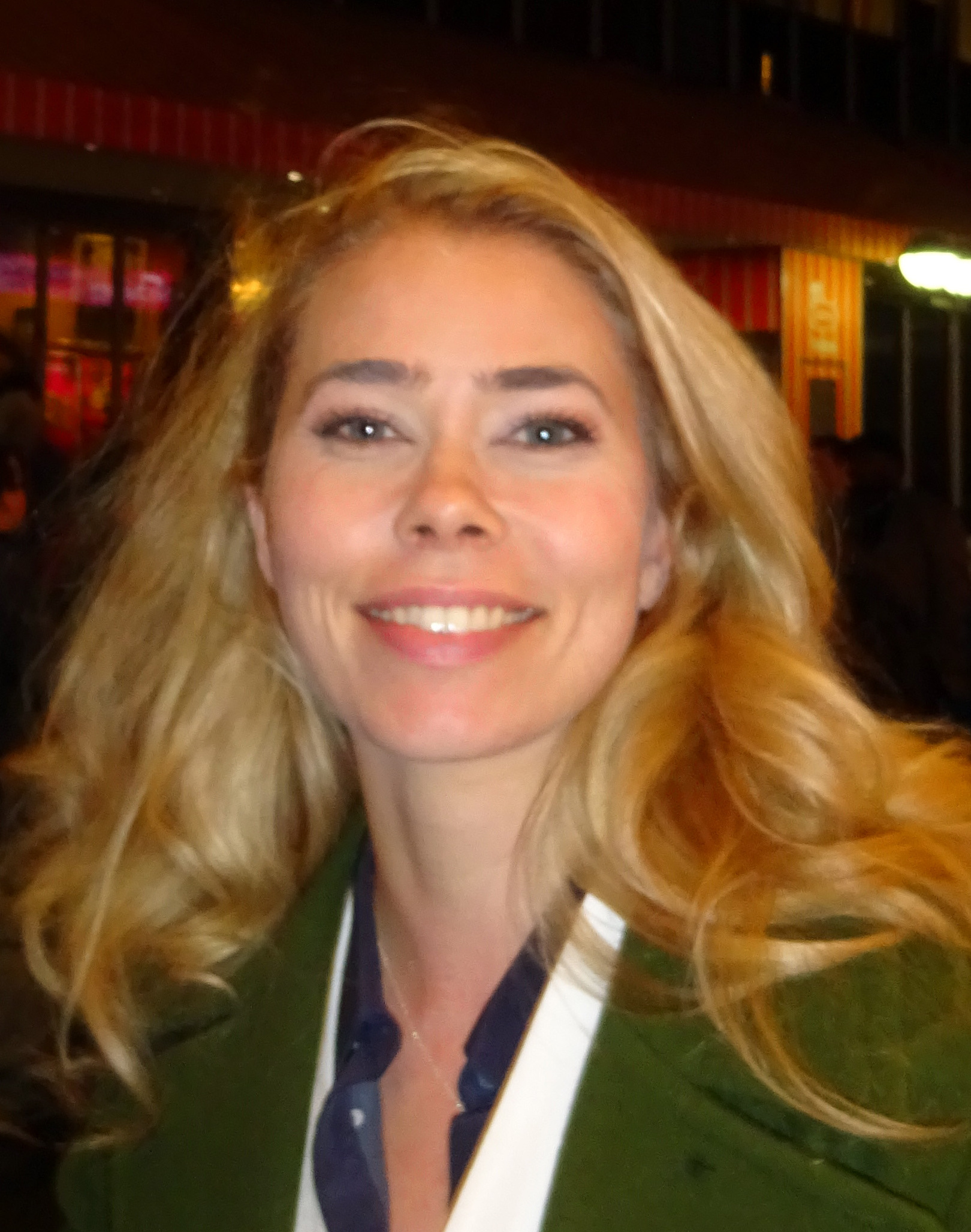
- Birgitte Hjort Sørensen
  Karsi (portrayed by Birgitte Hjort Sørensen) was a spear wife, and leader of an ice-river clan. When Jon Snow comes to Hardhome to allow the wildlings across the wall, Karsi hesitantly agrees to let her people on the boats. She is killed by the Army of the Dead when they attack Hardhome, and is resurrected as a wight.
- Loboda (portrayed by Zahary Baharov) was an elder of the Thenns as Hardhome. When Jon Snow comes to Hardhome to allow the wildlings across the wall, Loboda remains suspicious. When the Army of the Dead attack Hardhome, he is killed fighting a White Walker.

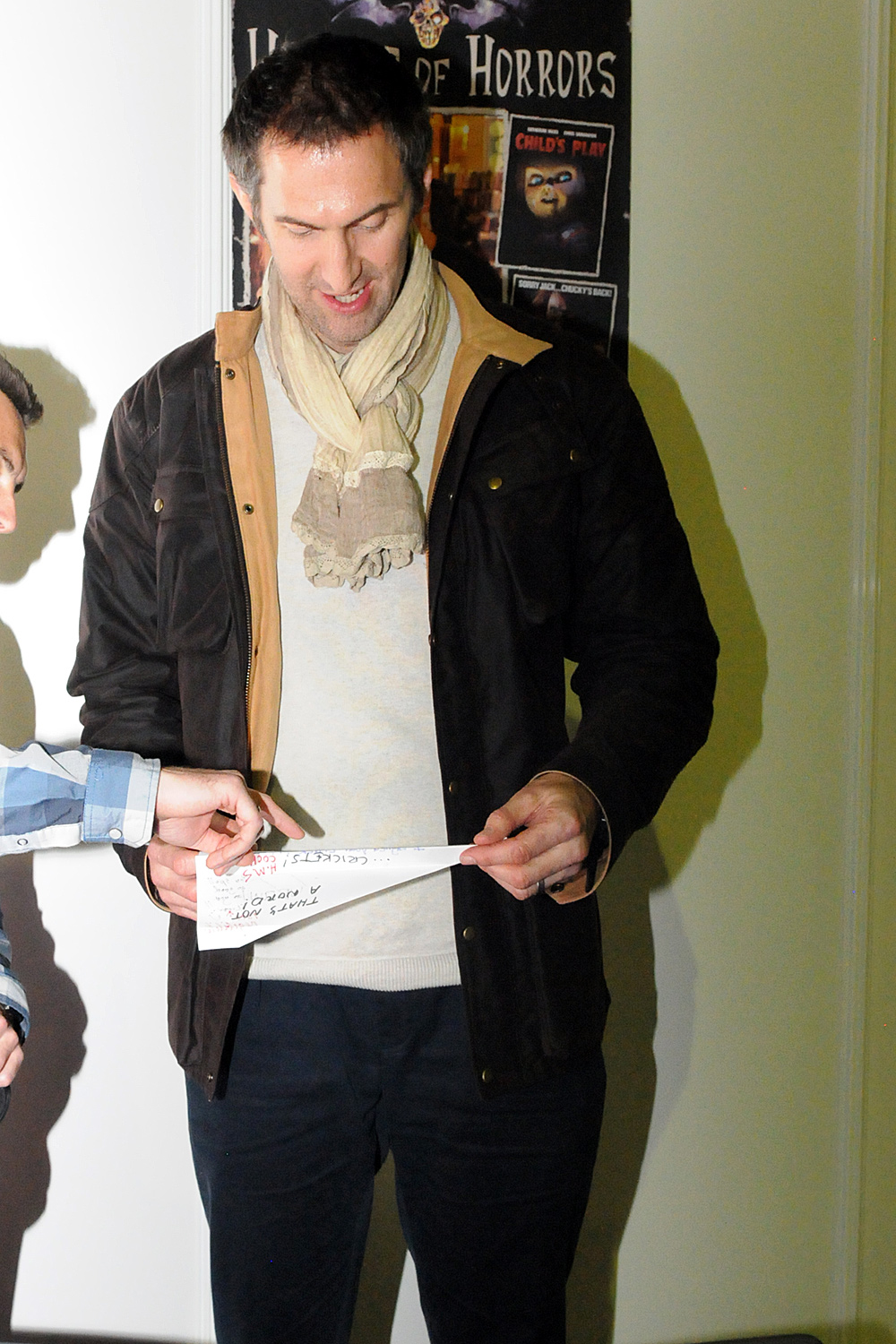
Ian Whyte

- Wun Weg Wun Dar Wun (portrayed by Ian Whyte) is a giant from Hardhome. He agrees to Jon's offer to allow the wildlings to pass through the Wall to escape the coming White Walkers, and escapes the ensuing massacre. Upon being alerted of Jon's death, Wun Wun joins the wildlings in returning to Castle Black to overthrow Alliser Thorne. After Jon is revived from the dead, he pleads with the wildlings to help him retake Winterfell from Ramsay Bolton, and Wun Wun is the first to agree. During the Battle of the Bastards, Wun Wun brings down a number of men and manages to breach the gates to Winterfell, but is shot with enough arrows and spears to bring him to his knees, and ultimately shot dead by Ramsay with an arrow to the eye.
- Johnna (portrayed by Ali Lyons) was a wildling who lived on Hardhome. Johnna is the daughter of Karsi and the older sister of Willa. When Jon Snow and Tourmund Giantsbane propose the wildlings resettle in the gift, in exchange for support against the White Walkers, Karsi agrees, and Johnna and her sister are loaded onto a boat, with Johnna looking after Willa. Karsi is killed in the Massacre of Hardhome. The sisters eventually travel south of the Wall, when they arrive at Castle Black.
- Dim Dalba (portrayed by Murray McArthur) is an elderly warrior and raider and one of the prominent leaders in the Free Folk army gathered by Mance Rayder. Following the defeat of the wildling army in the Battle of Castle Black, he leads his followers to the relative safety of Hardhome. In season 6, he pledges his army to fight for Jon Snow in the battle against the Boltons.

=== Animals ===
==== Direwolves ====
Direwolves are a canine species closely related to wolves but are much larger and stronger. In the book series, fully grown

direwolves are described as being as large as horses and are highly intelligent.

Thought to have gone extinct south of the Wall, six orphaned direwolf pups are found by Robb Stark and Jon Snow at the start of A Game of Thrones, the first book of the novel series, and are distributed among the six Stark children as pet companions. Four of them are still alive at the end of the fifth book A Dance with Dragons. In the HBO television adaptation, only two are alive at the end of the series.

- Ghost is Jon Snow's male direwolf, named due to it being albino and always quiet. Ghost is born the runt of the litter but later grows into the largest of the six Stark direwolves. He accompanies Jon to Castle Black. Following the Night's Watch mutiny, he is imprisoned by Karl and Rast. He is later freed by Bran Stark and mauls Rast to death before rejoining Jon and the loyal Night's Watch brothers. Though he is taken back to Castle Black, Alliser Thorne spitefully orders Jon to lock up Ghost. When the wildlings reach Castle Black, Jon orders Sam to free Ghost, and the direwolf subsequently helps the Night's Watch by mauling several wildlings to death. He survives the battle. After Jon departs for Hardhome, Ghost remains at Castle Black and scares off two Night's Watch bullies after they beat Sam and attempt to rape Gilly. After Jon is murdered by mutineers led by Alliser Thorne, Davos and the loyalists bring Ghost to help protect Jon's body. Once the mutineers are defeated and arrested, Ghost rests by Jon's body, and is later the first to witness Jon's resurrection back to life. Once Jon executes the mutineers and reunites with his sister Sansa, Ghost leaves Castle Black with Jon, but does not participate in the battle against the Boltons. After the Starks win, Ghost returns to Winterfell with Jon, and survives the battle against the Night King. Jon entrusts Ghost to Tormund when the latter departs back north beyond the Wall.
- Grey Wind was Robb Stark's male direwolf, named for its swift speed. He accompanies Robb on his campaign against the Lannisters and often fights alongside him in the War of the Five Kings. When Robb is betrayed by Walder Frey and Roose Bolton, Grey Wind is locked up in a pen and killed with crossbows.
- Lady was Sansa Stark's female direwolf, named due to it being the smallest and prettiest of the pups. After an incident on the Kingsroad when Nymeria bites Joffrey, Cersei first demands that Nymeria be killed, and when Nymeria cannot be found, demands that a direwolf be killed. Despite his objections, Ned Stark obeys the king's order but kills Lady personally, though he sends her body north instead of allowing Cersei to have her skin.
- Nymeria is Arya Stark's female direwolf, named after a legendary Rhoynish warrior queen whom Arya admires. On the way to King's Landing, Crown Prince Joffrey Baratheon attacks Arya with a sword after she attempts to defend her friend, the butcher's son Mycah, from his abuse. Nymeria comes to protect Arya and bites Joffrey in the arm. Knowing that Joffrey will lie to the court about what actually transpired, Arya forces Nymeria to flee to prevent it from being killed. A very long time afterward, Arya reunites with Nymeria in the Riverlands on her way back home to Winterfell and finds out that Nymeria has joined a pack of wild wolves. Arya attempts to urge Nymeria to return with her, but Nymeria turns away and remains with her new pack.
- Summer was Bran Stark's male direwolf. When an assassin attempts to murder the comatose Bran, Summer tears out the assassin's throat, saving both Bran and Bran's mother Catelyn. Summer and Shaggydog survive the sacking of Winterfell by Ramsay Snow and join Bran, Rickon, and their group on their journey to the Wall to find Jon Snow. When they stumble across Craster's Keep, Bran mentally takes over Summer's body to scout the area, but Summer falls into a trap and is imprisoned. He is later freed and continues the journey north with Bran. During the battle with the skeletons outside the Three-Eyed Raven's cave, Summer mauls several and escapes with Bran into the caves. After the White Walkers and the Wights attack the tree, the group is forced to escape. Only Meera and Bran make it out alive as Hodor, Summer, the Children of the Forest, and the Three-Eyed Raven are all slain by the undead while giving Bran time to escape.
- Shaggydog was Rickon Stark's male direwolf, and is the only black one and the most temperamental of all the direwolf pups, whom Jojen Reed describes as "full of fear and rage". Following the sacking of Winterfell, Shaggydog and Summer join Rickon, Bran, Osha and the Reed siblings on their journey to the Wall to find Jon Snow. When the journey beyond the Wall is deemed too dangerous for Rickon, the group splits up, and Shaggydog accompanies Rickon and Osha to go to House Umber at Last Hearth. However, after Greatjon dies, his son Smalljon decides to ally with the Boltons and goes to Ramsay Bolton, to whom he gives Osha and Rickon as hostages, while presenting Shaggydog's severed head as proof of Rickon's identity.

==== Dragons ====
- Drogon is the black one of Daenerys' three dragons. Visibly the biggest and Daenerys's favourite dragon, Drogon is named after Khal Drogo, her late husband. Throughout seasons 2 and 3, Drogon is loyal to Daenerys, but in season 4, he roars in her face when she tries to stop him from harming the other dragons over food, which makes her realise that she may be losing control over her dragons. While in Meereen, Daenerys receives two complaints from the citizens of Slaver's Bay about Drogon's behaviour, one of them a shepherd whose flock of sheep Drogon torched, and the second a farmer whose three-year-old daughter Drogon killed. Though Drogon disappears before he can be captured, he saves Daenerys from an ambush in Daznak's Pit and flies off with her on his back, though he is wounded by the Sons of the Harpy in the process. He later lands in the Great Grass Sea, where Daenerys will be captured by Dothrakis. Drogon will finally join with her and his brothers and they finally sail towards Westeros. When Drogon discovers Daenerys' lifeless body, he is overwhelmed with anger and grief, realizing how his mother's obsession for the Iron Throne brought her to her own death. Drogon then proceeds to burn the Iron Throne until it is nothing but a puddle of molten slag. He then grasps Daenerys' body in his talons and flies with it across the Narrow Sea.
- Rhaegal was the green one of Daenerys' three dragons. He is named after Daenerys' deceased brother, Rhaegar Targaryen. When Daenerys begins to lose control over them, she locks Rhaegal and Viserion in the catacombs beneath Meereen. She later goes to visit them, but they attempt to attack her, forcing her to flee. After being freed by Tyrion, Rhaegal flies to Westeros and is ridden by Jon Snow later on during the Battle of Winterfell. Rhaegal is eventually killed by Euron Greyjoy's fleet when Daenerys approaches King's Landing to strike a final attack on Cersei's troops.
- Viserion was the yellow one of Daenerys' three dragons. He is named after Daenerys' deceased brother, Viserys Targaryen. When Daenerys lost control over them, she locked Rhaegal and Viserion in the catacombs beneath Meereen. She later goes to visit them, but they attempt to attack her, forcing her to flee. Viserion was killed with an ice spear during a battle with the White Walkers beyond the Wall, only to be resurrected by the Night King. With the Night King riding on his back, Viserion breathes blue fire at the Wall, which then disintegrates. After the Battle of Winterfell, Viserion's body collapses into its skeletal form after Arya kills the Night King.

== See also ==
- Characters in A Song of Ice and Fire
- List of Game of Thrones episodes
- Northern Inuit Dog
