= List of Strike Back episodes =

Strike Back is a British action thriller military television series, broadcasting on Sky One in the United Kingdom, and Cinemax in the United States. It is based on a novel of the same name by novelist and former Special Air Service (SAS) soldier Chris Ryan. Strike Back follows the actions of Section 20, a secretive branch of the British Secret Intelligence Service (MI6), who operate several high risk, priority missions throughout the globe.

The series began broadcasting on Sky One on 5 May 2010, showing the first six-part series. After a second series was commissioned, it was announced that Cinemax would co-produce the franchise. The ten-part second series, undergoing the banner title Project Dawn in the United Kingdom, first aired on Cinemax on 12 August 2011. A ten-part third series, under the banner title Strike Back: Vengeance, has aired in the United Kingdom and United States. The fourth series, Strike Back: Shadow Warfare, has aired both in the United Kingdom, and the United States. The fifth series, Strike Back: Legacy, aired from 3 June to 29 July 2015. A sixth series, Strike Back: Retribution, began airing in the UK on 31 October 2017. A seventh series, Strike Back: Revolution, began airing in the US on 25 January 2019.

As of 5 May 2022, 76 episodes have aired.

== Series overview ==
Series	Banner title	Episodes	Originally released		First aired	Last aired
Series	Banner title	Episodes	First released	Last released	First aired	Last aired
1	Strike Back	6	5 May 2010	19 May 2010	25 October 2013	29 November 2013
2	Project Dawn	10	21 August 2011	23 October 2011	12 August 2011	21 October 2011
3	Vengeance	10	2 September 2012	4 November 2012	17 August 2012	12 October 2012
4	Shadow Warfare	10	28 October 2013	30 December 2013	9 August 2013	18 October 2013
5	Legacy	10	3 June 2015	29 July 2015	31 July 2015	9 October 2015
6	Retribution	10	31 October 2017	28 February 2018	2 February 2018	6 April 2018
7	Revolution	10	28 February 2019	2 May 2019	25 January 2019	29 March 2019
8	Vendetta	10	25 February 2020	28 April 2020	14 February 2020	17 April 2020

== Episodes ==
=== Series 1: Strike Back (2010) ===
No.	Title	Directed by	Written by	U.S. air date	U.S. viewers (millions)	U.K. air date	U.K. viewers (millions)
1	Episode 1	Daniel Percival	Jed Mercurio	25 October 2013	0.259	5 May 2010	1.008
2	Episode 2	Daniel Percival	Jed Mercurio	1 November 2013	0.218	5 May 2010	0.803
3	Episode 3	Daniel Percival	Jed Mercurio & Alan Whiting	8 November 2013	0.301	12 May 2010	0.857
4	Episode 4	Daniel Percival	Jed Mercurio & Alan Whiting	15 November 2013	0.275	12 May 2010	0.764
5	Episode 5	Edward Hall	Robert Murphy	22 November 2013	0.279	19 May 2010	0.890
6	Episode 6	Edward Hall	Robert Murphy	29 November 2013	N/A	19 May 2010	0.872

=== Series 2: Project Dawn (2011) ===
No.	Title	Directed by	Written by	U.S. air date	U.S. viewers (millions)	U.K. air date	U.K. viewers (millions)
7	Episode 1	Daniel Percival	Frank Spotnitz	12 August 2011	0.567	21 August 2011	1.137
8	Episode 2	Daniel Percival	Frank Spotnitz	19 August 2011	0.169	28 August 2011	1.185
9	Episode 3	Bill Eagles	Frank Spotnitz	26 August 2011	0.255	4 September 2011	1.098
10	Episode 4	Bill Eagles	Frank Spotnitz	9 September 2011	0.212	11 September 2011	1.090
11	Episode 5	Alex Holmes	Richard Zajdlic	16 September 2011	0.302	18 September 2011	0.982
12	Episode 6	Alex Holmes	Richard Zajdlic	23 September 2011	0.336	25 September 2011	1.022
13	Episode 7	Paul Wilmshurst	Simon Burke	30 September 2011	0.270	2 October 2011	0.943
14	Episode 8	Paul Wilmshurst	Simon Burke	7 October 2011	0.335	9 October 2011	1.104
15	Episode 9	Daniel Percival	Tony Saint	14 October 2011	0.244	16 October 2011	1.061
16	Episode 10	Daniel Percival	Tony Saint	21 October 2011	0.249	23 October 2011	1.126

=== Series 3: Vengeance (2012) ===
No.	Title	Directed by	Written by	U.S. air date	U.S. viewers (millions)	U.K. air date	U.K. viewers (millions)
17	Episode 1	Bill Eagles	Tony Saint	17 August 2012	0.390	2 September 2012	0.770
18	Episode 2	Bill Eagles	Tony Saint	17 August 2012	0.390	9 September 2012	0.749
19	Episode 3	Paul Wilmshurst	James Dormer	24 August 2012	0.333	16 September 2012	0.725
20	Episode 4	Paul Wilmshurst	James Dormer	31 August 2012	0.266	23 September 2012	0.693
21	Episode 5	Julian Holmes	Richard Zajdlic	7 September 2012	0.325	30 September 2012	0.751
22	Episode 6	Julian Holmes	Richard Zajdlic	14 September 2012	0.263	7 October 2012	0.736
23	Episode 7	M. J. Bassett	John Simpson	21 September 2012	0.358	14 October 2012	0.885
24	Episode 8	M. J. Bassett	John Simpson	28 September 2012	0.310	21 October 2012	0.849
25	Episode 9	Bill Eagles	Tony Saint	5 October 2012	0.235	28 October 2012	0.821
26	Episode 10	Bill Eagles	Tony Saint	12 October 2012	0.249	4 November 2012	0.826

=== Series 4: Shadow Warfare (2013) ===
No.	Title	Directed by	Written by	U.S. air date	U.S. viewers (millions)	U.K. air date	U.K. viewers (millions)
27	Episode 1	M. J. Bassett	Simon Burke & Tim Vaughan & M. J. Bassett	9 August 2013	0.493	28 October 2013	0.796 (Note: 728,000 on Sky 1, 68,000 on Sky 1+1)
28	Episode 2	M. J. Bassett	Simon Burke & Tim Vaughan & M. J. Bassett	16 August 2013	0.364	4 November 2013	0.805 (Note: 725,000 on Sky 1, 80,000 on Sky 1+1)
29	Episode 3	Julian Holmes	James Dormer	23 August 2013	0.331	11 November 2013	0.781 (Note: 716,000 on Sky 1, 65,000 on Sky 1+1)
30	Episode 4	Julian Holmes	James Dormer	6 September 2013	0.506	18 November 2013	0.726 (Note: 635,000 on Sky 1, 91,000 on Sky 1+1)
31	Episode 5	Paul Wilmshurst	John Simpson	13 September 2013	0.417	25 November 2013	0.732 (Note: 599,000 on Sky 1, 133,000 on Sky 1+1)
32	Episode 6	Paul Wilmshurst	John Simpson	20 September 2013	0.447	2 December 2013	0.701 (Note: 569,000 on Sky 1, 132,000 on Sky 1+1)
33	Episode 7	Stephen Woolfenden	Simon Burke & Ben Newman	27 September 2013	0.309	9 December 2013	0.820 (Note: 689,000 on Sky 1, 131,000 on Sky 1+1)
34	Episode 8	Stephen Woolfenden	M. J. Bassett & Tim Vaughan	4 October 2013	0.312	16 December 2013	0.832 (Note: 717,000 on Sky 1, 115,000 on Sky 1+1)
35	Episode 9	M. J. Bassett	Richard Zajdlic	11 October 2013	0.400	23 December 2013	0.742 (Note: 622,000 on Sky 1, 120,000 on Sky 1+1)
36	Episode 10	M. J. Bassett	Richard Zajdlic	18 October 2013	0.436	30 December 2013	0.709 (Note: 622,000 on Sky 1, 87,000 on Sky 1+1)

=== Series 5: Legacy (2015) ===
No.	Title	Directed by	Written by	U.S. air date	U.S. viewers (millions)	U.K. air date	U.K. viewers (millions)
37	Episode 1	M. J. Bassett	M. J. Bassett & Tim Vaughan & James Dormer	31 July 2015	0.237	3 June 2015	0.989 (Note: 902,000 on Sky 1, 87,000 on Sky 1+1)
38	Episode 2	M. J. Bassett	M. J. Bassett & Tim Vaughan & James Dormer	7 August 2015	0.275	10 June 2015	0.718 (Note: 628,000 on Sky 1, 90,000 on Sky 1+1)
39	Episode 3	Julian Holmes	James Dormer	14 August 2015	0.221	17 June 2015	0.609 (Note: 549,000 on Sky 1, 60,000 on Sky 1+1)
40	Episode 4	Julian Holmes	James Dormer	21 August 2015	0.204	24 June 2015	0.611 (Note: 539,000 on Sky 1, 72,000 on Sky 1+1)
41	Episode 5	Brendan Maher	Jack Lothian	28 August 2015	0.251	1 July 2015	0.798 (Note: 680,000 on Sky 1, 118,000 on Sky 1+1)
42	Episode 6	Brendan Maher	Jack Lothian	11 September 2015	0.234	8 July 2015	0.626 (Note: 545,000 on Sky 1, 81,000 on Sky 1+1)
43	Episode 7	M. J. Bassett	Richard Zajdlic & Ed Whitmore	18 September 2015	0.166	15 July 2015	0.558 (Note: 496,000 on Sky 1, 62,000 on Sky 1+1)
44	Episode 8	M. J. Bassett	Ed Whitmore & Jack Lothian	25 September 2015	0.280	22 July 2015	0.591 (Note: 513,000 on Sky 1, 78,000 on Sky 1+1)
45	Episode 9	M. J. Bassett	Jack Lothian	2 October 2015	0.196	29 July 2015	0.810 (Note: 699,000 on Sky 1, 111,000 on Sky 1+1)
46	Episode 10	M. J. Bassett	Jack Lothian	9 October 2015	0.286	29 July 2015	0.694 (Note: 601,000 on Sky 1, 93,000 on Sky 1+1)

=== Series 6: Retribution (2017–18) ===
No.	Title	Directed by	Written by	U.S. air date	U.S. viewers (millions)	U.K. air date	U.K. viewers (millions)
47	Episode 1	M. J. Bassett	Jack Lothian	2 February 2018	0.135	31 October 2017	0.503
48	Episode 2	M. J. Bassett	Jack Lothian	9 February 2018	0.133	7 November 2017	0.822
49	Episode 3	Brendan Maher	Jack Lothian & James Payne & Steve Bailie	16 February 2018	0.089	14 November 2017	0.754
50	Episode 4	Brendan Maher	Jack Lothian & James Payne & Steve Bailie	23 February 2018	0.138	21 November 2017	0.555
51	Episode 5	M. J. Bassett	Jack Lothian	2 March 2018	0.112	28 November 2017	0.569
52	Episode 6	Debs Paterson	Jack Lothian	9 March 2018	0.093	31 January 2018	0.602
53	Episode 7	Bill Eagles	Jack Lothian & Simon Allen	16 March 2018	0.132	7 February 2018	0.660
54	Episode 8	Bill Eagles	Jack Lothian & Simon Allen	23 March 2018	0.145	14 February 2018	0.562
55	Episode 9	M. J. Bassett	Jack Lothian	30 March 2018	0.130	21 February 2018	0.516
56	Episode 10	M. J. Bassett	Jack Lothian	6 April 2018	0.095	28 February 2018	0.527

=== Series 7: Revolution (2019) ===
No. overall	No. in season	Title	Directed by	Written by	U.S. air date	U.S. viewers (millions)	U.K. air date	U.K. viewers (millions)
57	1	Episode 1	Bill Eagles	Jack Lothian	25 January 2019	0.116	28 February 2019	0.447
58	2	Episode 2	Bill Eagles	Jack Lothian	1 February 2019	0.113	7 March 2019	0.616
59	3	Episode 3	Paul Wilmshurst	Jack Lothian	8 February 2019	0.060	14 March 2019	0.631
60	4	Episode 4	Paul Wilmshurst	Jack Lothian	15 February 2019	0.114	21 March 2019	0.59
61	5	Episode 5	Steve Shill	Jack Lothian	22 February 2019	0.090	28 March 2019	0.656
62	6	Episode 6	Steve Shill	Jack Lothian	1 March 2019	0.096	4 April 2019	0.564
63	7	Episode 7	Mark Everest	Jack Lothian & Chris Cornwell	8 March 2019	0.121	11 April 2019	0.608
64	8	Episode 8	Mark Everest	Jack Lothian	15 March 2019	0.127	18 April 2019	0.559
65	9	Episode 9	Bill Eagles	Jack Lothian	22 March 2019	0.100	25 April 2019	0.515
66	10	Episode 10	Bill Eagles	Jack Lothian	29 March 2019	0.133	2 May 2019	0.504

=== Series 8: The Final Season (2020) ===
No. overall	No. in season	Title	Directed by	Written by	U.S. air date	U.S. viewers (millions)	U.K. air date	U.K. viewers (millions)
67	1	Episode 1	Paul Wilmshurst & Bill Eagles	Jack Lothian	February 14, 2020	0.077	February 25, 2020	0.441
68	2	Episode 2	Paul Wilmshurst	Jack Lothian	February 21, 2020	0.059	March 3, 2020	0.808
69	3	Episode 3	Bill Eagles	James Dormer & Jack Lothian	February 28, 2020	0.063	March 10, 2020	0.69
70	4	Episode 4	Bill Eagles	James Dormer & Jack Lothian	March 6, 2020	0.034	March 17, 2020	0.553
71	5	Episode 5	Jon Jones	Jack Lothian	March 13, 2020	0.093	March 24, 2020	0.244
72	6	Episode 6	Jon Jones	Jack Lothian	March 20, 2020	0.059	March 31, 2020	0.61
73	7	Episode 7	John Strickland	Jack Lothian	March 27, 2020	0.100	April 7, 2020	0.664
74	8	Episode 8	John Strickland	Jack Lothian	April 3, 2020	0.089	April 14, 2020	0.647
75	9	Episode 9	Bill Eagles	Jack Lothian	April 10, 2020	0.044	April 21, 2020	0.643
76	10	Episode 10	Bill Eagles	Jack Lothian	April 17, 2020	0.133	April 28, 2020	0.744

== Home video releases ==
Series	DVD release dates		
Series	Region 1	Region 2	Region 4
1	—	5 May 2011	5 May 2011
2	7 August 2012	14 November 2011	5 December 2012
3	6 August 2013	5 November 2012	24 December 2014
4	4 August 2015	6 January 2014	—
5	1 March 2016	10 August 2015	—
