= Strike Back (TV series) =

British/American television series

- The broadcast title of the series since the second series, Project Dawn.
- Genre: Action-adventure; Drama; Spy thriller
- Based on: Strike Back by Chris Ryan
- Written by: Simon Burke; James Dormer; Jed Mercurio; Robert Murphy; Tony Saint; John Simpson; Frank Spotnitz; Alan Whiting; Richard Zajdlic
- Directed by: M. J. Bassett; Bill Eagles; Edward Hall; Alex Holmes; Daniel Percival; Julian Holmes; Paul Wilmshurst; Stephen Woolfenden
- Starring: Richard Armitage; Andrew Lincoln; Philip Winchester; Sullivan Stapleton; Amanda Mealing; Michelle Lukes; Rhona Mitra; Liam Garrigan; Robson Green; Milauna Jackson; Daniel MacPherson; Warren Brown; Alin Sumarwata; Roxanne McKee; Nina Sosanya; Phil Dunster; Katherine Kelly; Jamie Bamber; Yasemin Allen; Varada Sethu
- Opening theme: "Short Change Hero" – The Heavy (Series 2 onwards)
- Country of origin: United Kingdom
- Original language: English
- No. of seasons: 8
- No. of episodes: 76 (list of episodes)

Production
- Executive producers: Andy Harries; Huw Kennair-Jones; Sharon Hughff; Daniel Percival; Elaine Pyke; Tony Saint; Frank Spotnitz
- Producers: Sue De Beauvoir; Andrew Benson; Michael Casey; Chris Clough; Trevor Hopkins; Bill Shepard; Chris Thompson; Nuala O'Leary; Lawrence Cochran; Huberta Von Liel
- Production locations: South Africa (Series 1–4); Hungary (Series 2, 4–6); Thailand (Series 5); Slovenia (Series 5); Jordan (Series 6); Malaysia(Series 7); Croatia (Series 8)
- Running time: 42-48 minutes
- Production company: Left Bank Pictures

Original release
- Network: Sky One (United Kingdom); Cinemax (United States)
- Release: 5 May 2010 – 17 April 2020

Strike Back is a British action thriller television series based on the 2007 novel of the same name by novelist and former Special Air Service soldier Chris Ryan. The series follows the actions of Section 20, a secretive branch of the British Secret Intelligence Service (SIS, aka MI6), who operate several high risk, priority missions around the world. The six-part first series began broadcasting on Sky One on 5 May 2010.

After a second series was commissioned, it was announced that Cinemax would co-produce the franchise. The first episode of the ten-part second series, under the banner title Project Dawn in the United Kingdom, first aired on Cinemax on 12 August 2011. The ten-part third series, under the title Strike Back: Vengeance, began airing on Cinemax on 17 August 2012. On 3 October 2012, Cinemax and Sky commissioned a fourth series, Strike Back: Shadow Warfare, which was broadcast on Cinemax beginning 9 August 2013. A ten-episode, fifth series titled Strike Back: Legacy aired in 2015, with the last episode airing on 29 July, and at that point, this was to be final series for the show.

On 8 December 2016, Cinemax and Sky announced they would revive the show for a sixth series, Strike Back: Retribution which debuted on 31 October 2017 on Sky One in the UK, and in the US on Cinemax on 2 February 2018. On 27 March 2018, Strike Back was renewed for a seventh series titled Strike Back: Revolution. Filming commenced in late 2018, with a release date of 25 January 2019 on Cinemax and 28 February 2019 on Sky One. On 27 February 2019, Cinemax renewed the series for an eighth and final series titled Strike Back: Vendetta, which premiered on 14 February 2020.

Ratings for Strike Back were relatively high for the original networks. The Sky One premiere was viewed by almost 400,000 viewers (according to overnight figures), tripling the average audience share for the channel's time slot after three months. Project Dawn premiered to more than 600,000. The Cinemax premiere saw the network's best ratings since 2005.

== Episodes ==
Series	Banner title	Episodes	Originally released		First aired	Last aired
Series	Banner title	Episodes	First released	Last released	First aired	Last aired
1	Strike Back	6	5 May 2010	19 May 2010	25 October 2013	29 November 2013
2	Project Dawn	10	21 August 2011	23 October 2011	12 August 2011	21 October 2011
3	Vengeance	10	2 September 2012	4 November 2012	17 August 2012	12 October 2012
4	Shadow Warfare	10	28 October 2013	30 December 2013	9 August 2013	18 October 2013
5	Legacy	10	3 June 2015	29 July 2015	31 July 2015	9 October 2015
6	Retribution	10	31 October 2017	28 February 2018	2 February 2018	6 April 2018
7	Revolution	10	28 February 2019	2 May 2019	25 January 2019	29 March 2019
8	Vendetta	10	25 February 2020	28 April 2020	14 February 2020	17 April 2020

=== Chris Ryan's Strike Back (2010) ===
John Porter (Richard Armitage) led an SAS rescue mission in Iraq, on the eve of the invasion in 2003. During the operation, Porter spared the life of a thirteen-year-old suicide bomber. Shortly after, the boy apparently killed two of Porter's team. Porter was held responsible by his commanders and forced to resign.

Seven years later, Porter is "reactivated" following the kidnap of journalist Katie Dartmouth (Orla Brady), daughter of a former government minister, by the same terrorists whom he had fought in 2003, including the same boy, As'ad. Porter succeeds in rescuing Dartmouth and joins Section 20, headed by Hugh Collinson (Andrew Lincoln), who had also taken part in the fateful mission. By the end of the series, it is revealed that Collinson was the one who killed the two soldiers, and covered this up. Section 20 officer Layla Thompson (Jodhi May) discovers his guilt, and blackmails Collinson into saving Porter's life in Afghanistan. There, Porter learns that during the mission, Collinson panicked and mistook the soldiers for terrorists. Taliban members raid their location, and Collinson is mortally wounded while aiding Porter's escape.

=== Project Dawn (2011) ===
Porter is captured by a Pakistani terrorist called Latif (Jimi Mistry) while investigating Project Dawn, one of Latif's planned operations. Sergeant Michael Stonebridge (Philip Winchester) finds Damian Scott (Sullivan Stapleton), a disgraced ex-Delta Force operative who cannot even find work with private military contractors. Scott had previously worked with Porter to track Latif. After Porter is executed, Section 20 discover that Porter left the team clues to a hotel in New Delhi, India, where a group of terrorists attempt to capture a weapons scientist with knowledge of hidden weapons of mass destruction originally used to plant in Iraq, which serves as a part of Project Dawn. The weapon, namely VX nerve gas, was kept in storage, and Latif knew of its existence.

Section 20's worldwide search for Latif ends in Budapest, Hungary, where they learn he is implanting explosives inside suicide bombers' bodies, which in turn will release the VX. The attempted attacks against a World Summit were actually a diversion to capture former Pakistani general Akmal Ramiz (Silas Carson), who Latif fears will make Pakistan more accessible to the west. He also captures Section 20 head Colonel Eleanor Grant (Amanda Mealing) in an attempt to confess to "Operation Trojan Horse", which planned to plant VX in Iraq, while also exposing Porter and framing Scott; Grant attempted to cover up the operation in shame. In the end, Grant forces Latif to shoot an empty VX canister, with the explosives still intact, killing them both. Although Scott gains the file that would clear his name, he decides to burn the file and remain in Section 20. Meanwhile, Stonebridge leaves the organisation to be with his pregnant wife.

=== Vengeance (2012) ===
Former military intelligence operative Major Rachel Dalton (Rhona Mitra) takes charge of Section 20. Its operatives work throughout Africa to recover four nuclear triggers which have fallen into the wrong hands after a mission in Somalia. The triggers were originally sold to Conrad Knox (Charles Dance), an English billionaire and philanthropist based in South Africa, who runs the Knox Foundation. The Foundation has been set up with the aim of disarming unstable regions, but it becomes apparent that Knox is arming his own militia with the weapons and is building nuclear weapons containing the triggers. He intends to liberate Africa "to a point where its voice is not just heard but listened to." Owing to Knox's influence, Section 20 is forced to go dark to stop him.

In the meantime, Stonebridge seeks revenge on Craig Hanson (Shane Taylor) for murdering his wife and returns to Section 20, while Scott has to contend with Central Intelligence Agency (CIA) agent Christy Bryant (Stephanie Vogt), with whom he used to carry out contract killings. Scott also has a relationship with Rebecca, a Mossad contract assassin (Lyne Renée). By the conclusion of the series, two of the bombs are recovered, and the remaining two are disarmed before they can destroy Johannesburg. Stonebridge fulfills his revenge and Knox, fleeing the failed attempt, dies by accidentally shooting himself in a street altercation with the very South Africans he hoped to empower.

=== Shadow Warfare (2013) ===
Scott and Stonebridge are recalled from holiday in California to capture Leo Kamali (Zubin Varla), a high-ranking member of a terrorist cell led by al-Zuhari, an elusive terrorist. After capturing him in Colombia, it is revealed that Kamali is working deep cover with the CIA to stop al-Zuhari. As Kamali is pressured to work with Section 20, Dalton is suspended by Lt. Colonel Philip Locke (Robson Green), who takes charge. Dalton is later killed by the Real Irish Republican Army (IRA), who have joined forces with al-Zuhari's group. In the meantime, Scott and Stonebridge are wanted by the Russian mafia after killing the son of mob boss Arkady Ulyanov (Marcel Iureș) in Colombia. Scott learns he fathered a child from one of his past relationships, while Stonebridge is infected with a neurotoxin during one of Section 20's missions in Beirut, which affects his combat abilities.

After attacking the British Embassy in Budapest, the IRA and al-Zuhari's group steal a NATO hard drive and send it to a prison in Russia where a Swedish hacker and prisoner, Erik Andersson, is forced to decrypt it. While on mission in Russia, Section 20 also become aware of a secretive facility where al-Zuhari's scientists are weaponising smallpox to be used to attack NATO bases. After the mission, Stonebridge is given the antidote to the toxin, and Kamali is executed by al-Zuhari's men for being a double agent. Section 20 learn that al-Zuhari's group intends to attack a NATO base in Berlin, Germany, where it is revealed that Kamali faked his death, having been behind the operation the entire time (it is revealed that the Israelis killed al-Zuhari six months before). After the terrorists successfully infect a train and the NATO base's hospital, Section 20 thwart Kamali's plot to fly a plane over Berlin to infect the city. Both Kamali and Ulyanov are killed by 20 during an exchange arranged by Locke. In his last moments, Kamali reveals that his daughter Ester has a pendant that contains the cure to the smallpox, though only enough to save those infected at the hospital.

=== Legacy (2015) ===
Strike Back returned to Cinemax on 31 July 2015 for the final series of ten new episodes. Initially scheduled for summer 2014, the series had to be pushed back owing to an off-set injury to series star Sullivan Stapleton.

Scott and Stonebridge are sent on a mission to rescue Chloe Foster, the kidnapped daughter of Robin Foster, a British diplomat negotiating North Korea's nuclear disarmament. Robin is forced to carry a bomb into the chambers of the North Korean delegation, killing a general. Section 20 investigates Office 39, a clandestine branch of the North Korean army, and identifies Robin's wife, Mei Foster, as an Office 39 deep-cover agent. Mei has spent her life trying to advance North Korea's nuclear programme and has used her position to broker a deal with the yakuza to acquire key components for long-range missiles. Section 20 are unsuccessful in intercepting a shipment of vanadium, leading Scott and Stonebridge to infiltrate North Korea and sabotage their missile production, setting the programme back decades. Mei is blamed for the failure—despite repeatedly warning her government about Section 20—and turns rogue, activating a network of sleeper agents across Europe. They build an improvised nuclear device and plan to set it off at a summit in Geneva. Section 20 operatives disarm the bomb but the diplomatic fallout sees Whitehall disavow them. Scott and Stonebridge are ambushed by a CIA kill team and go on the run.

=== Retribution (2017) ===
Terrorist leader Omair Idrisi (Don Hany) is captured by British special forces, only to be freed by his wife Jane Lowry (Katherine Kelly) during a prisoner transfer on the Syrian-Jordanian border. Colonel Adeena Donovan (Nina Sosanya) recruits Sergeant Thomas 'Mac' McAllister (Warren Brown), Sergeant Samuel Wyatt (Daniel MacPherson), Lance Corporal Gracie Novin (Alin Sumarwata) and Captain Natalie Reynolds (Roxanne McKee) into the revived Section 20 to capture Idrisi and Lowry. Section 20's mission takes them across North Africa where Idrisi is seemingly killed in an airstrike. The team pursue Lowry into Hungary where they learn that she is trying to locate a rogue Russian biochemist in order to acquire a sample of the nerve agent Novichok. Idrisi is revealed to have survived the airstrike where he was captured by Octagon, a private military contractor running a secret and illegal extraordinary rendition program. Lowry intends to use the Novichok to break her husband out of a black site in Poland. When Section 20 thwart her plans by destroying the Novichok laboratory, Lowry attacks the black site directly and succeeds in freeing Idrisi. Section 20 follow them to Croatia where Reynolds and Novin learn that Donovan recruited Lowry, at the time a prostitute, for "Project Tenebrae". Lowry infiltrated Idrisi's terrorist cell and convinced Donovan and the British government to fund a symbolic terror attack designed to further her cover. However, Lowry was radicalised by Idrisi and attacked a civilian target instead, killing an American diplomat. With British Intelligence complicit in a terror attack, Lowry stole a copy of "the Atlas", a database of British and American operations which she intended to give to Russia. Idrisi was subsequently captured, prompting Lowry to hide the Atlas on an island off the Croatian coast. Reynolds and Novin are forced to kill Donovan when it becomes apparent that Section 20 was reactivated to kill Lowry, recover the Atlas and cover up Project Tenebrae. McAllister and Wyatt are unable to prevent the Russians from securing the Atlas, leading Section 20 to raid a Russian intelligence bunker and steal a database of their own. Disavowed by their governments, Section 20 trade the database server for the Atlas and the series ends with the four trying to escape pursuit by the Russians.

=== Revolution (US) / Silent War (UK) (2019) ===
The seventh series was announced in 2018 and premiered in 2019. Brown, MacPherson and Sumarwata all reprise their roles from Retribution and are joined by Jamie Bamber as Section 20's new commanding officer Colonel Alexander Coltrane and Yasemin Kay Allen as Katrina Zarkova, a Russian agent in South-East Asia. Between the announcement of the new series and its broadcast, the UK title was changed to "Silent War".

The story sees Section 20 investigating the downing of a Russian bomber in the South China Sea and the disappearance of its nuclear payload. The team cross paths with Katrina Zarkova, the leader of a Russian Alpha Group unit tasked with discreetly locating the bomb which is believed to be in the possession of someone named "Kingfisher". With her unit dead, Zarkova forms an uneasy alliance with Section 20 to the frustration of her handler Pavel Kuragin. Together they track the bomb to India where it is dismantled and reassembled as two portable nuclear devices before being smuggled into Myanmar, camouflaging its Russian origins. Kuragin reveals to Zarkova that Kingfisher is not a person, but the code-name of a clandestine operation that he is a part of.

Kuragin and Zarkova take the bombs to Indonesia and provide one to a dormant Islamist terror network. Kuragin arranges to have them caught by a rogue special forces team, intending to use the incident to instigate a military coup and install a new government that is friendly to Russian interests. This will restore Russia's political influence and bolster its flagging economy in the wake of international sanctions imposed after the annexation of Crimea. Section 20 intervene and thwart Kuragin's plans, prompting him to go rogue. The Russian government disavow him and enlist Section 20's aid in finding him. The search leads them to the Philippines, where Kuragin brings down a Cold War-era satellite containing the launch keys to a chemical weapons facility in Azerbaijan. Kuragin intends to launch missiles carrying VX nerve gas at London to force Russia and the West into a war. He rationalises the inevitable destruction of Russia as necessary to restore its dignity. Novin kills Kuragin before Zarkova can force him to stop the launch, leading Section 20 to risk their lives destroying the facility.

=== Vendetta (2020) ===
The final season, Vendetta, was announced in December 2019 and premiered on 14 February 2020. The series was announced without a subtitle. Brown, MacPherson, Sumarwata and Bamber all reprise their roles from Retribution and are joined by Varada Sethu as Lance Corporal Manisha Chetri. Sethu had appeared as a supporting character in Retribution before she was promoted to the main cast. When an Albanian crime family kidnaps a scientist responsible for the development of a top-secret British bio weapon, the covert special-ops soldiers of Section 20 are sent on a mission to secure the virus and take down its potential black-market buyers. But what starts as a relatively straightforward mission quickly escalates into a race against the clock to neutralize an even deadlier weapon of mass destruction pursued by a pair of jihadist brothers, whose terrifying ambitions threaten global conflict. Along the way, Section 20 reunites with rogue Russian operative Katrina Zarkova to form a tenuous alliance that raises questions of friendship, loyalty and duty.

== Cast and characters ==
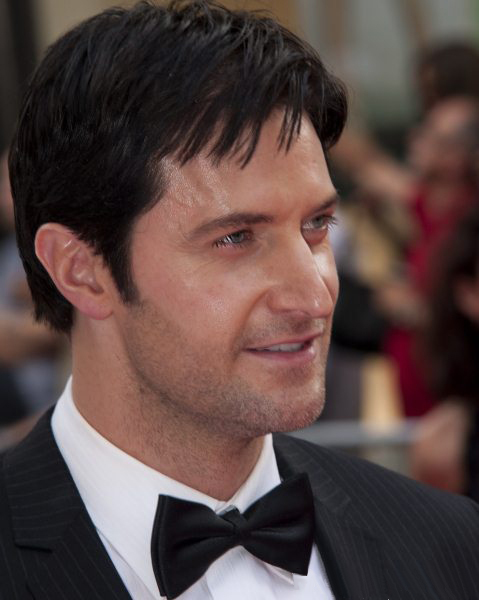
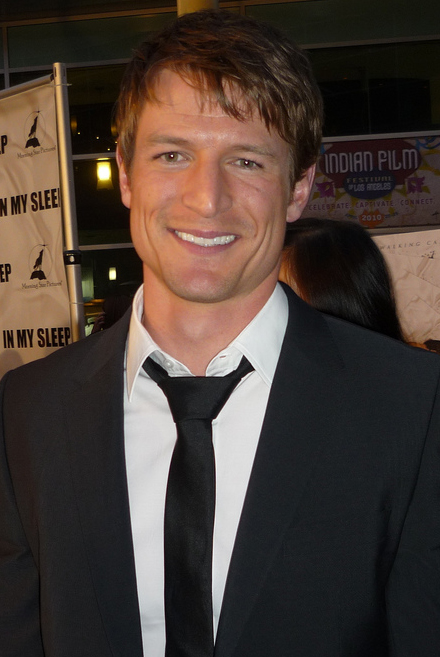
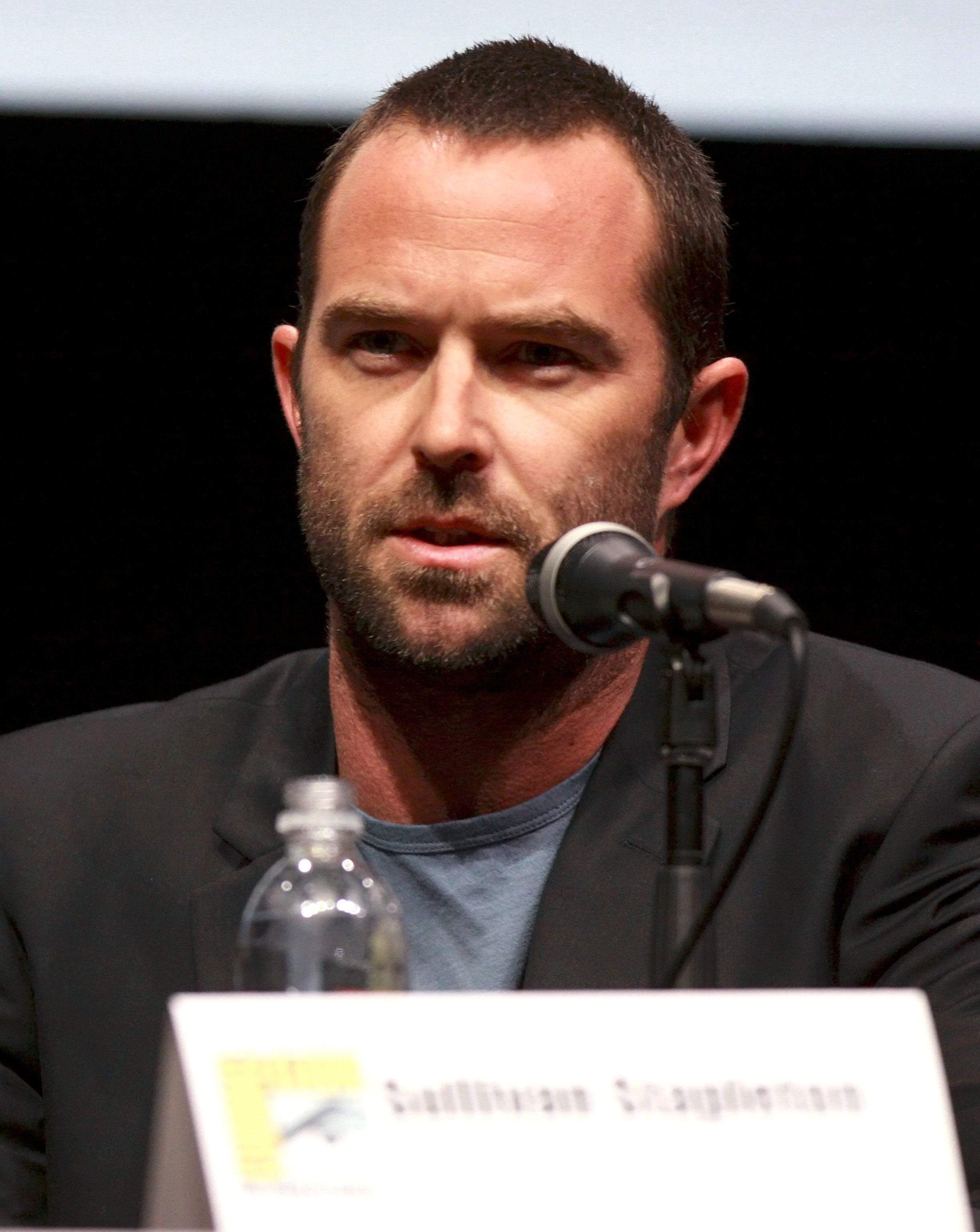
Richard Armitage (left) plays first series lead John Porter. However, owing to other acting commitments, he could not return as a regular in Project Dawn, so Philip Winchester (centre) and Sullivan Stapleton (right) replaced Armitage as the series leads until the sixth series when new leads were introduced.

Richard Armitage plays the first series protagonist, SAS Sergeant John Porter, a character who is brought back into service by Section 20 seven years after he resigns from a botched rescue mission. Armitage describes the character as "sort of like Lucas North [the character he played on the BBC espionage series Spooks], only on some kind of go-faster drug." Following the announcement of the second series, Armitage had to drop out of the role, following his commitment to appear as Thorin Oakenshield in The Hobbit films. He was replaced by Sullivan Stapleton, who plays former United States Delta Force Sergeant Damian Scott, and Philip Winchester who plays British SBS Sergeant Michael Stonebridge. Stapleton was originally contracted to appear in two series but stayed on until series 5.

In the first series, Andrew Lincoln plays Hugh Collinson, Porter's comrade in the 2003 mission and Section 20 boss. Jodhi May plays Lieutenant Layla Thompson, an "ambitious woman working in a male-dominated field that she's climbed to the top of". Over the course of the first series she grows to distrust Collinson. Shelley Conn plays Sergeant Danni Prendiville, a Section 20 officer who has an affair with Porter. Colin Salmon appears as civil servant James Middleton, and Orla Brady plays kidnapped Sky war correspondent Katie Dartmouth.

In series two, Amanda Mealing plays Collinson's successor, Colonel Eleanor Grant, described as a "smart, tough military leader who is skilled with a gun and diplomacy, but knows when to break a rule or two." Eva Birthistle plays Captain Kate Marshall, a "crack commando" who oversees Section 20's military personnel, and with whom Stonebridge had an extra-marital affair. Rhashan Stone plays Major Oliver Sinclair, Grant's right-hand man, and Section 20's second-in-command. Michelle Lukes plays Sergeant Julia Richmond, one of the newer recruits of Section 20 with the ability to speak seven languages. Jimi Mistry plays Project Dawn villain Latif, the Pakistani terrorist and mastermind behind the eponymous plot.

In the third series Vengeance, Rachel Dalton, played by Rhona Mitra, replaces Grant who was killed off at the conclusion of Project Dawn. Richmond becomes more active in the field in this series. The primary antagonists of Vengeance are guns-for-hire Karl Matlock, played by Vincent Regan. and Conrad Knox, a billionaire who is using his humanitarian work as a front to build his own militia, played by Charles Dance.

The sixth series Strike Back: Retribution introduces a new set of characters to replace Scott and Stonebridge; they include Daniel MacPherson as Sergeant Samuel Wyatt, Warren Brown as Sgt Thomas 'Mac' McAllister, Roxanne McKee as Captain Natalie Reynolds (for one series only) and Alin Sumarwata as Lance Corporal Gracie Novin.

Jamie Bamber plays the new commanding office Colonel Alexander Coltrane starting with Strike Back: Revolution in 2019.

== Production ==
=== Development ===
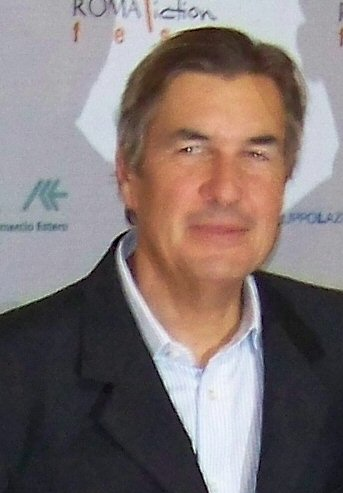
Andy Harries pitched the series to BSkyB, even though he had not read the book.

The television series is based on a novel of the same name by Chris Ryan, a former SAS soldier who was known as the only member of his unit, Bravo Two Zero, to evade capture by Iraqi forces during the Gulf War in 1991, and was regarded as the most difficult escape for a British soldier. Ryan became a novelist after leaving the SAS. Andy Harries, the chief executive of his production company, Left Bank Pictures, saw the novel Strike Back at an airport while on holiday, but never got around to reading it. Regardless, he still managed to pitch the idea of a series from the novel to Sky's Head of Drama Elaine Pyke, who commissioned it. Harries said of the experience, "I read the back of the book just to remind myself, I remember Elaine saying 'what's the story' and I said 'Don't worry about that, it's really the thrust of the piece.'" The commission became part of Sky's £10 million commitment to producing original dramas based on novels following the network's success in adapting the Discworld novels from Terry Pratchett. It was also a part of Sky's attempt to replicate the pace of American-based action series including 24. Chris Ryan became involved in the project by acting as a series consultant and script advisor. Harries also served as a producer on the show.

A second series of Strike Back was commissioned by Sky in August 2010, for a longer run of 10 episodes. Later, in February 2011, it was announced that Sky entered an international co-production deal with the American television network Cinemax, as the network wanted to introduce a new original drama series. The first episodes of the series was written by The X-Files alum Frank Spotnitz. Spotnitz was brought in to start the second series with the purpose to re-imagine the show, as the producers needed it to work in the absence of first series lead Richard Armitage, owing to the actor's commitment to The Hobbit film series in New Zealand.

=== Training ===
In the first series, Armitage had to "bulk up for the role." The actor spent ten weeks with a trainer in the UK, before moving to Johannesburg, where the first series was shot, and participated in more training; however, he had to spend ten days after arriving to acclimatise to the city's high altitudes. Before the second series, more main cast members took up intensive bootcamp style training in South Africa by former SAS and SBS operators. The two leads Stapleton and Winchester underwent the most intensive training. The actors were trained in many aspects including running, teamwork, tactical manoeuvres with and without weapons and other various military tactics. Winchester recalled his training experience, "[Sullivan Stapleton] and I would meet every morning at 6am. We would run to a chosen location and on the way we had to memorise street names and directions and then our trainers would say 'that car that you just passed what was the licence plate number?' Our trainers were ex-SAS guys who made us study everything in detail, for example, we learnt step by step how to enter a room in twos, then alone. At the same time, we had to be constantly aware of where our weapon was trained."

The series uses a vast array of firearms and other weapons, including side arms, assault and sniper rifles, rocket-propelled grenades, hand grenades and other explosives as well as knives and other weapons. In training, cast members started by carrying weights that mimicked the weapons so they could get used to carrying them during filming. They were later taught how to handle various firearms used in the series to make it appear as real as possible, they were taught to disassemble and re-assemble, fire and reload the weapons used before scenes/shooting. Former SAS and SBS servicemen gave many of the cast weapons training, and were also on hand during the filming to oversee and advise the cast members on the proper handling and use of the various weapons and tactics used in different scenes.

=== Filming and locations ===
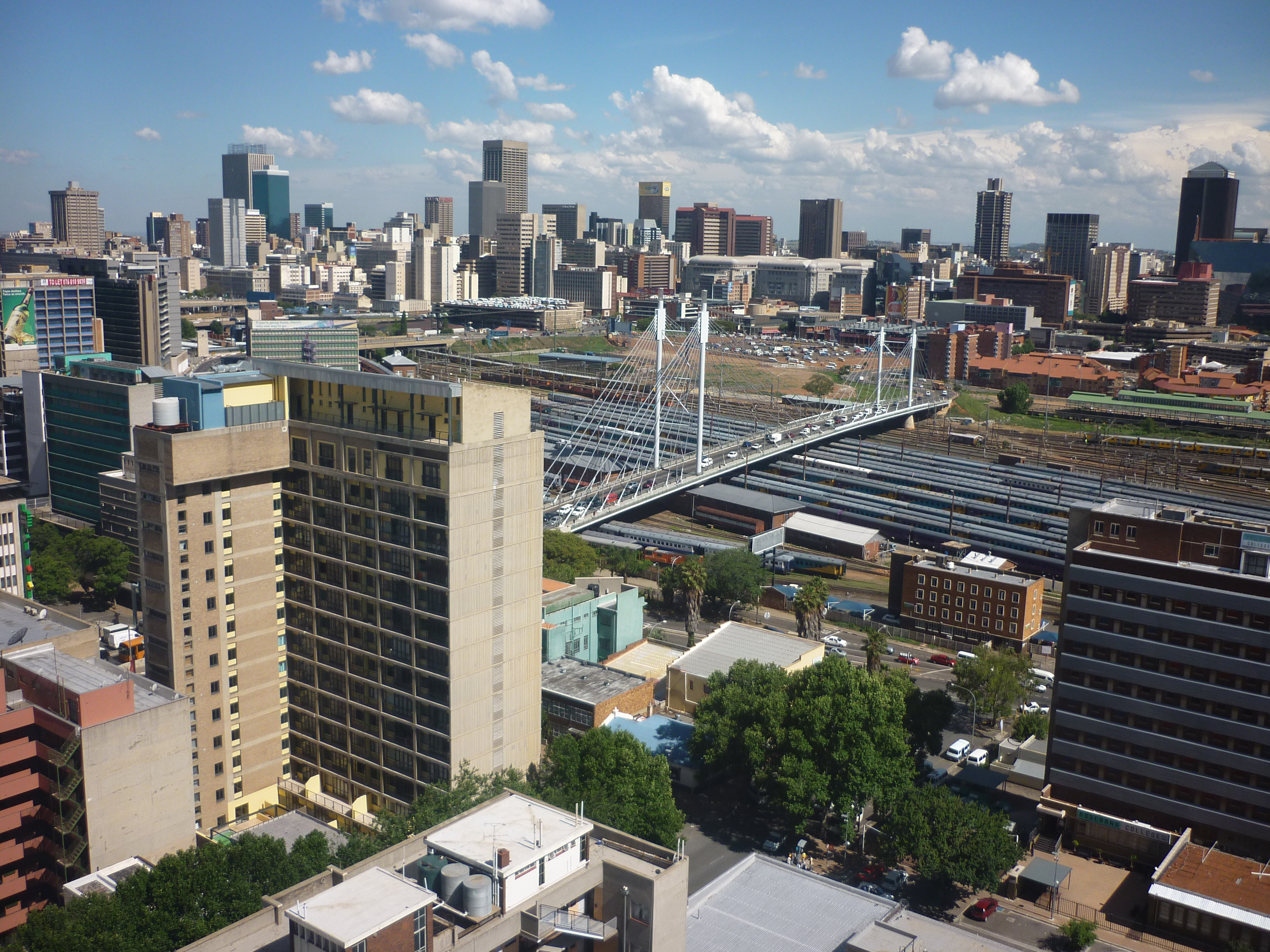
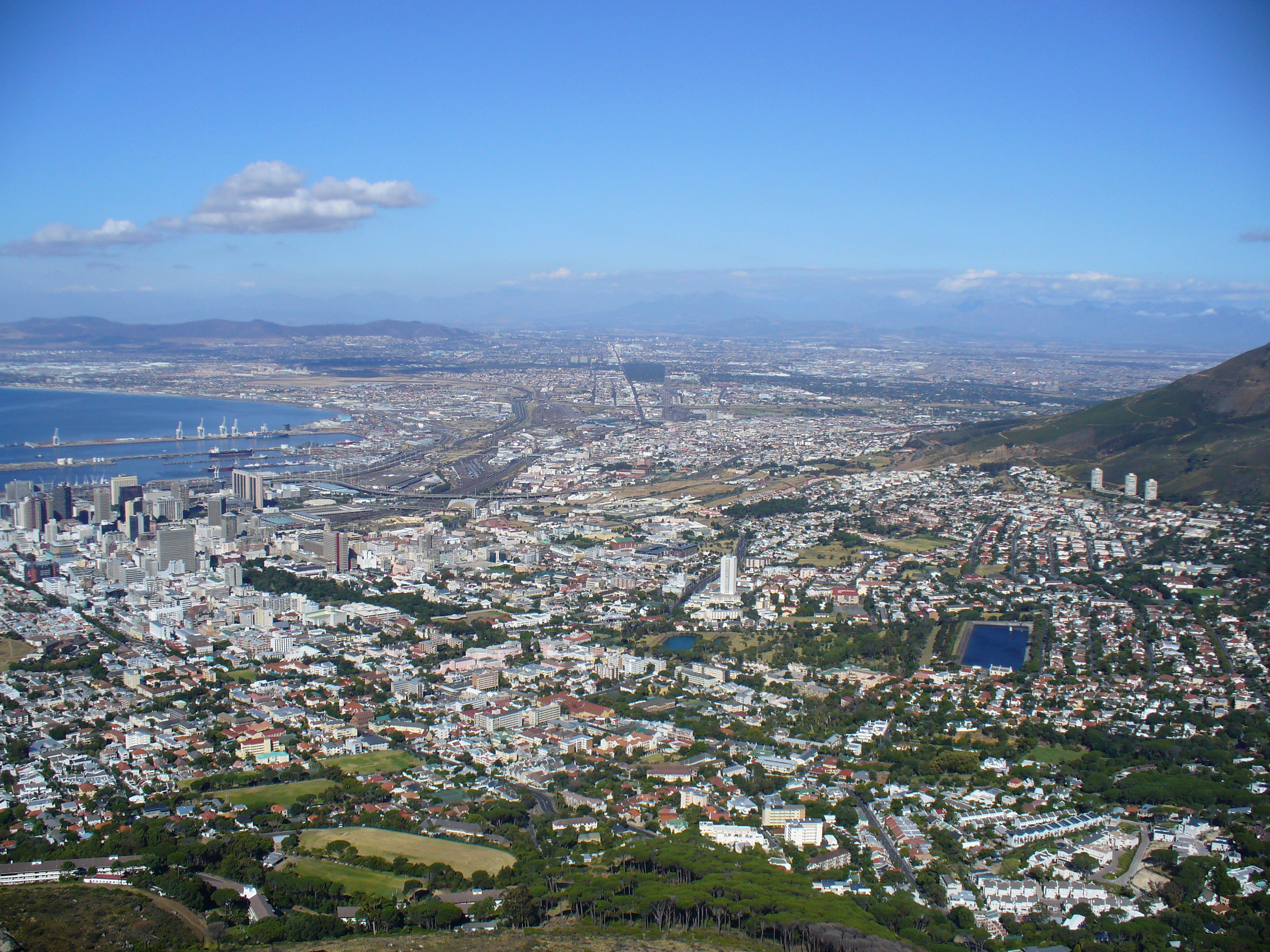
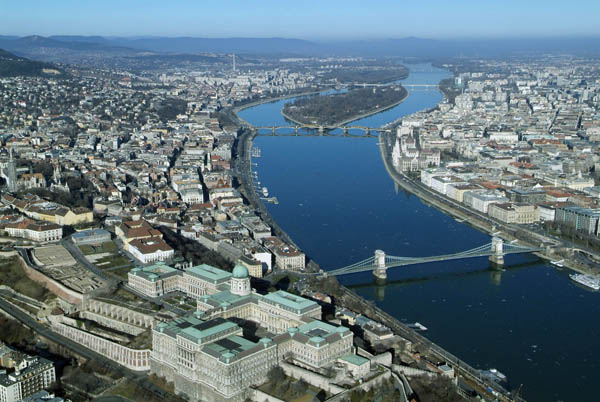
The principal filming locations include Johannesburg (left) and Cape Town, South Africa (centre), and Budapest, Hungary (right).

Filming the first series began in South Africa in August 2009, and was shot with 35mm film. 35mm cameras were used because the crew regard them as "the best and most flexible capture medium" available. Three Kodak film stocks were used for filming the series, along with a variety of Arri cameras. Each scene uses a minimum of two cameras, but the crew regularly use four camera angles.

Having worked in South Africa several times in the past, Mancub decided to use the country as the filming location for the series, as he felt it could replicate anywhere in the world. The first series was largely filmed in the Gauteng province, including its capital, Johannesburg. Local crew members were used to collaborate with the British crew. Starting with Project Dawn, Cape Town was largely used as a filming location, with other episodes filmed in Durban and Springbok, Northern Cape. Before filming Project Dawn, the production crew were scouting other filming locations throughout Europe, South America and the United States. The series would additionally be shot in Budapest, Hungary. Some other scenes were also shot in the UK. The first two episodes of Vengeance were originally scheduled to film in Mozambique, but a week before filming was due to start the country had "a massive freedom fighter rally."

== Broadcast and reception ==
=== Broadcast and ratings ===
The series aired on Sky One in the United Kingdom. The first series began airing on 5 May 2010, originally showing two episodes for three weeks. According to overnight viewing figures, the premiere episode was seen by 398,000 viewers and a 1.7 per cent audience share, becoming one of the most viewed non-terrestrial broadcasts, and more than tripled Sky One's average audience in their slots from the previous three months. Project Dawn began on 21 August 2011, but was showing just one episode a week that time. Overnight ratings saw a substantial increase over the first series premiere, having been seen by 616,000 viewers, with a 2.6 per cent audience share. Vengeance premiered on 2 September 2012; however, overnight ratings decreased to 385,000, and was beaten by new episodes of The Simpsons and Sinbad, which aired on the same channel.

The United States did not initially air the first series, but on 25 October 2013 it was aired with the title Strike Back: Origins. The first series to air in the US was Project Dawn, and was known as "Season One" in the country, it began airing on Cinemax on 12 August 2011. The premiere attracted 567,000 viewers on its first telecast, and an additional 500,000 viewed the two following encores. Despite the limited availability of the network on American television (only 16.7 million homes have Cinemax available), it was the best ratings performance for the network since a broadcast of the film Titanic in 2005. Vengeance premiered with two back-to-back episodes, on 17 August 2012. It attracted 390,000 viewers, with encores increasing viewership to more than half a million. Vengeance averaged 310,000 viewers with an 18 to 49 rating of 0.13.

The series was also made available in other countries. In Australia, the first series aired on ABC1, with Project Dawn airing on Channel Seven. In Canada the show airs on HBO Canada, while in France, it is shown on Canal+. In Belgium, the second series of the show began airing on La Deux on 28 April 2013 while the channel did not show the first series.

=== Critical reception ===
Strike Back received generally positive reviews from television critics. It has an overall metacritic rating of 71, indicating generally favourable reviews based on 30 critics. Its first season received a rating of 64, increasing to 78 in season 3.

=== Awards and nominations ===
Strike Back was nominated for six accolades, winning two. In 2010, the first series was nominated for Best Digital Choice for the National Television Awards. In 2012, the series was nominated for a Primetime Emmy Award for Outstanding Main Title Design, and Eva Birthistle was nominated for Best Actress in a Supporting Role TV in the ninth annual Irish Film & Television Awards in 2012. In the same year, Strike Back won a UK Screen Association Conch Award for Best Audio on TV Drama of the Year. Additionally the series won a Royal Television Society Award for Best Special Effects, with South African company Big Bang Stunts & Effects being the recipient. It was also nominated for Best Sound in Drama in 2010.

== Home media releases ==
The first series of Strike Back was released on a two-disc set on DVD and Blu-ray Disc on 7 June 2010 in the United Kingdom (Region 2), just two weeks after the conclusion of the series on television. In Australia (Region 4), the DVD was released on 3 May 2011, while the Blu-ray was released later on 2 June. The release consisted of all six episodes, which were edited to three feature-length episodes, along with special features, namely cast interviews and behind the scenes featurette.

The second series, Project Dawn, was released on a three-disc set on DVD and Blu-ray on 14 November 2011. Along with the ten episodes, the set includes the special featurettes Top Secrets: Making Strike Back: Project Dawn, Firearms Training, and Scott Vs Igor Fight Scene featurettes, as well as broadcast titles. On the same day of its release, a collection of both series were also released on DVD and Blu-ray. In the United States (Region 1), the series, labelled Strike Back: Cinemax Season One, was released on 7 August 2012. The American release includes audio commentaries from various cast and crew members on five episodes, along with a DVD and digital copy on the Blu-ray edition. Vengeance was released on DVD on 5 November 2012 in the UK. The fifth series was available only in the UK until 1 March 2016, at which time the North American DVD and Blu-ray disc versions were released. Series 1–5 are available in the UK as PAL DVDs, and series 2–5 (North American Cinemax series 1–4) have all been available in North America as NTSC DVDs and Blu-ray discs since 1 March 2016. A manufacture-on-demand DVD of the final series, The Last Shot, was released via the Warner Archive Collection on August 25, 2020.

== Future ==
=== Feature film ===
It was announced in October 2015 that plans to make a Strike Back feature film were in the early planning stages, with the two leads, Winchester and Stapleton, to reprise their roles.
