= Strike Back: Project Dawn =

- Blu-ray cover for the series.
- No. of episodes: 10

Release
- Original network: Sky1; Cinemax
- Original release: 12 August – 21 October 2011

Series chronology
- ← Previous; Strike Back Next → Vengeance

Strike Back: Project Dawn, as it is known in the United Kingdom, is a ten-part British action television serial and is the second series of Strike Back. However, the only cast member to return from the first series was Richard Armitage in the first episode. The main cast for the series includes Philip Winchester, Sullivan Stapleton, Amanda Mealing, Eva Birthistle, Michelle Lukes and Rhashan Stone. The series follows the actions of Section 20, a secret branch of the British Secret Intelligence Service (MI6), particularly two of its officers, Michael Stonebridge (Winchester) and former American Delta Force operative Damian Scott (Stapleton). Section 20 leads a worldwide manhunt to find and capture Pakistani terrorist Latif, who is plotting an operation of his known as "Project Dawn".

Sky announced Strike Back would be returning for a third series after the first aired. They entered a co-production deal with the American premium cable network Cinemax, who wanted to introduce new original drama series to the network. In order to prepare for their roles several main cast members spent a month training with former officers of the Special Air Service and Special Boat Service. Filming began in February 2011 and took place across South Africa and Hungary.

The series began broadcasting on Cinemax in the United States on 12 August 2011, with the premiere being seen by nearly 1.1 million viewers, the highest ratings achieved by the network since 2005. It later began broadcasting on Sky1 in the United Kingdom on 21 August with higher ratings than that of the first series. Critical reaction of the series was generally favourable in the United States; however, British reviewers were more mixed. Reviewers made comparisons to various other television dramas including 24, Sleeper Cell, Spooks and The Unit. Project Dawn was released on DVD and Blu-ray in Region 2 on 14 November 2011. In October 2011, Cinemax announced it has renewed Strike Back for another 10-part series, to be titled Strike Back: Vengeance.

== Episodes ==
In this table, the number in the first column refers to the episode's number within the entire series, "US viewers in millions" refers to how many Americans watched the episode on Cinemax, while "UK viewers in millions" refers to how many Britons watched the episode on Sky1. The series plays out as five two-part episodes.

No.	Title	Directed by	Written by	U.S. air date	U.S. viewers (millions)	U.K. air date	U.K. viewers (millions)
7	Episode 1	Daniel Percival	Frank Spotnitz	12 August 2011	0.567	21 August 2011	1.137
John Porter (Armitage) is kidnapped by Pakistani terrorist Latif, who is masterminding "Project Dawn". As Porter is one of only two westerners who can identify Latif, Section 20 head Colonel Eleanor Grant (Mealing) appoints Sergeant Michael Stonebridge (Winchester) to find the other; dishonourably discharged Delta Force operative Damian Scott (Stapleton), in Kuala Lumpur, Malaysia. When Scott is brought to London, Section 20 witness Porter's live execution. As the team mourn their loss, Scott realises that Porter used code in the execution video, directing the team to a hotel in New Delhi, India. Scott and Stonebridge's arrival is soon followed by a gang of terrorists (likely recruited by Latif from the insurgent group Lashkar-e-Taiba, which has conducted a number of similar terrorist attacks in India in real life), who hold everybody hostage and demand that someone named Mahmood reveals himself. Stonebridge and two of the hostages escape and meet with Scott; however, they find themselves surrounded when one of the hostages turns out to be the terrorist leader.
8	Episode 2	Daniel Percival	Frank Spotnitz	19 August 2011	0.169	28 August 2011	1.185
Scott and Stonebridge evade the terrorists and find Mahmood, who turns out to be a woman, Iman Zubedah (Sasha Behar). Zubedah reveals she knows the location of hidden weapons of mass destruction (WMD) that were to be planted in Iraq to vindicate the war. After Scott is recaptured and taken to the lobby with the other hostages, Zubedah is escorted out by the terrorist leader, assumed to be Latif (Scott earlier admits that he never actually saw him). Stonebridge rescues Zubedah and kills the leader. When the Indian military storm the hotel, Scott fails to stop the terrorists from dropping a bomb, but Stonebridge arrives in time to catch it. Zubedah is later brought to Pakistani intelligence officer Jamal Ashkani (Mistry), who is revealed to be Latif; Zubedah is later found dead. After Scott is assigned to Section 20, he reveals to Stonebridge that Porter's code was directed at Scott; Porter no longer trusted Section 20, believing it is embroiled in a conspiracy involving Latif, the WMDs, his capture, and Scott's dishonourable discharge. Scott and Stonebdrige decide to investigate the possible corruption.
9	Episode 3	Bill Eagles	Frank Spotnitz	26 August 2011	0.255	4 September 2011	1.098
Section 20 set up base in Cape Town, South Africa to track former Provisional Irish Republican Army (IRA) terrorist Daniel Connelly (Liam Cunningham), who is believed to be associated with Latif. Connelly and his gang rob an armoured truck, and clone a hard drive belonging to Kenneth Bratton's (Alistair Petrie) weapons company ATAT, which contains information on chemical weapons. Porter previously rescued Bratton from Iraq in 2003. Connelly also has Bratton's family watched in order to get him to cooperate. The gang hires Buckley, an American hacker, to break into the hard drive, due to the fact that their previous hacker had been killed by one of the guards during the armored truck robbery. However, as Scott and Stonebridge chase him, Stonebridge is forced to kill him, forcing Scott to pose as Buckley and lead Section 20 to Connelly. When Scott meets the gang, however, they capture him and send him to a farm where they strap a bomb to him. Stonebridge soon arrives at the farm, but as he is about to move in, the bomb detonates.
10	Episode 4	Bill Eagles	Frank Spotnitz	9 September 2011	0.212	11 September 2011	1.090
It is revealed that Scott is alive; Connelly directed the bomb away from his body as a test to see if he would call for help. When he passes by not doing so, Scott is told he is to override the security system of Bratton's secure facility, with the help of the hard drive and Major Oliver Sinclair (Rhashan Stone). Bratton calls Captain Kate Marshall (Birthistle) for help in his family's protection. Kate learns that ATAT was under pressure to plant VX nerve gas in Iraq. During the meeting, the two are kidnapped by Connolly's men. Stonebridge tracks her to the facility Scott was sent to hack into. Connelly gains access to a package of VX before killing Bratton. Though Scott and Stonebridge capture Connelly and confiscate the VX, they find Kate rigged with a bomb. Connelly promises to disarm it if they let him go; however, he goes back on the deal and escapes, while Kate dies in the ensuing explosion. Grant later follows Connelly to Mozambique to kill him.
11	Episode 5	Alex Holmes	Richard Zajdlic	16 September 2011	0.302	18 September 2011	0.982
Section 20 capture Gerald Crawford (Iain Glen), a former Royal Marine-turned-arms dealer with ties to Latif, before making a sale. However, Crawford reveals the weapons were supposed to be an exchange for his daughter, Doctor Clare Somersby (Laura Haddock), who was kidnapped by the Janjaweed (a tribe of armed rebels) from an aid hospital in Darfur, Sudan. Section 20 agrees to rescue her, so long Crawford provides information on Latif's whereabouts. When he and the team arrive in Khartoum, Scott learns from Maggie (Rachel Shelley), a journalist he once slept with, that Crawford has accomplices who are following the exchange and will kill anybody in their way. During the exchange, they and Section 20 kill the Janjaweed members, but chieftain Tahir (Adewale Akinnuoye-Agbaje) escapes with Clare again. Scott is shot in the spleen by Crawford's men before they too are killed. As Maggie and Sinclair take Scott to a hospital, Crawford, Stonebridge and Jacoub (Abdul Salis), Maggie's driver whose family was a casualty of the Janjaweed, decide to follow Clare.
12	Episode 6	Alex Holmes	Richard Zajdlic	23 September 2011	0.336	25 September 2011	1.022
Scott and Sinclair are arrested at the hospital, though Grant later secures their release when the politician behind the arrest is loyal to Tahir. Meanwhile, Stonebridge is in "self-destruct mode" after Kate's death, and Crawford attempts to get him to focus. He also reveals that there is a British spy working for Latif, but would not divulge the name until Clare is safe. They soon find the Janjaweed camp; a local woman kills herself with a grenade to stop the Janjaweeds from raping her, allowing a distraction for Stonebridge to rescue Clare. However, they still have to drive back to Khartoum with the Janjaweed hot on their trial. Crawford is later shot by government forces. While they attempt to save him, their vehicle breaks down, and they are forced to fight Tahir's men. All the Janjaweed, and Tahir, are killed by the time Grant arrives, but Crawford dies from his injuries, but not before telling Clare the spy's name.
13	Episode 7	Paul Wilmshurst	Simon Burke	30 September 2011	0.270	2 October 2011	0.943
Grant has a female officer and psychologist, Marianna (Natalia Avelon), seduce Scott in an effort to learn more about him. Meanwhile, a minibus in Kosovo with five European Union officials is hijacked by Albanian terrorist and drug, human and organ trafficker Hassani (Mel Raido). He demands the release of his cousin, Rana, from Vienna, Austria. Grant controversially allows it, because one of the hostages is MI6 agent John Allen (Adrian Rawlins), Latif's spy. During the exchange, however, an unknown gunman (later revealed to be a CIA operative) kills Rana, forcing Scott and Stonebridge to rescue the hostages. Furthermore the rescue helicopter at the pick up point fails to arrive, forcing the group to find another location. When their truck runs out of petrol, Scott and Stonebridge attempt to steal another from Hassani's fortified heroin factory. A United States Army patrol later arrives to pick them up; however, it is revealed the soldiers are loyal to Hassani. Scott, Stonebridge and the hostages are taken to his stronghold.
14	Episode 8	Paul Wilmshurst	Simon Burke	7 October 2011	0.335	9 October 2011	1.104
Scott and Stonebridge learn that Allen is actually a double agent working to keep track on Latif's plans. Later, the hostages are taken in two separate transports, where the males are taken for organ harvesting, and the females for sex slavery. However, Scott finds that one of the American soldiers secretly gave him a gun to organise an escape. Following the escape, they search for the camp holding the female hostages. On the way, they encounter Hassani's men. Stonebridge stays behind to fight them off while the rest journey on to the other camp; however, one of the hostages dies while running through a mine field. Meanwhile, Hassani meets with Latif and Allen at the camp; Latif then has Allen and Hassani killed after they hand over intelligence on a weapons bunker in Chechnya. After Scott liberates the camp and rescues a captured Stonebridge, the hostages are taken to safety.
15	Episode 9	Daniel Percival	Tony Saint	14 October 2011	0.244	16 October 2011	1.061
Stonebridge learns that his wife Kerry (Moen) is pregnant, and she is forcing him to choose between her and his job. In the meantime, Section 20 find that eight people entered a weapons bunker in Chechnya, but none have since left. Scott and Stonebridge are sent there with the hope of capturing Latif. However, they find no one inside because there is an exit tunnel. Following orders to retrieve all computers, the Georgian Commandos set off a booby-trap, trapping Scott and Stonebridge in the tunnel. They journey through the tunnel system and find labs where Latif's scientists were working on VX delivery systems. They follow Latif's men to a nearby town, only to find themselves ambushed and forced to retreat. They do, however, believe that Latif intends to detonate containers of VX against civilian targets. Scott learns that Grant used Marianna to profile him. Section 20 then learns that Latif intends to attack a World Summit in Budapest, Hungary, and sets up base there. They follow a suspicious van to a warehouse; Scott and Stonebridge go there, and capture Latif.
16	Episode 10	Daniel Percival	Tony Saint	21 October 2011	0.249	23 October 2011	1.126
As Grant interrogates Latif, Section 20 spots two known terrorists arriving in Budapest. Scott and Stonebridge catch the first, who detonates the VX container placed inside his body in a tram; Scott and Stonebridge evacuate the area. On their return, Latif has sent a strike team to the Section base, and they ambush it; Latif escapes and captures Grant, along with Akmal Ramiz (Silas Carson), a Pakistani presidential candidate from the summit. Stonebridge is assigned to identify the second suicide bomber in a protest crowd, while Scott follows Grant's GPS. Latif forces Grant or Ramiz to confess to "Operation Trojan Horse", which dealt with planting VX in Iraq, setting up Porter and framing Scott that lead to his dishonourable discharge. Stonebridge stops the second bomber, but Latif remotely activates the canister; Stonebridge is able to remove and disarm it. Meanwhile, Latif kills Ramiz after Grant wishes to confess. He later realises that Scott is nearby and takes Grant hostage. However, Grant, no longer wishing to live with her guilt, forces Latif to shoot the VX canister she has in her possession, killing them both. Scott, now knowing he could clear his name, decides to burn the file instead, believing Grant did give him a second chance. Stonebridge decides to leave.

== Cast and characters ==
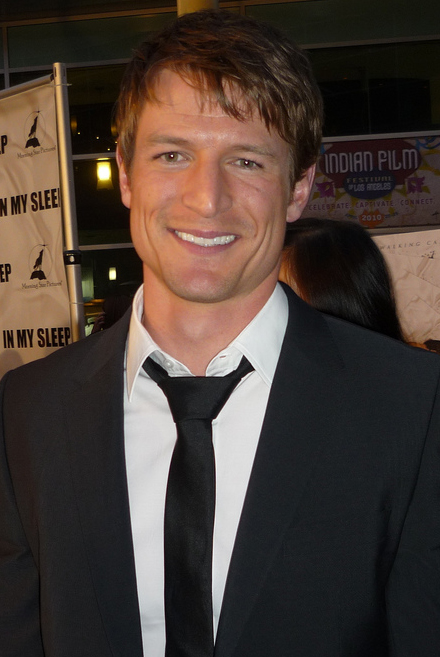
Philip Winchester portrays Michael Stonebridge.

Philip Winchester plays Sergeant Michael Stonebridge, a Royal Marine commando and former Special Boat Service (SBS) operator, now assigned to Section 20 who is partnered with Scott to help track down a kidnapped Porter. Stonebridge works for Section 20 and is in charge of his team on the ground. Although the character is married to his wife Kerry (Alexandra Moen), he has an affair with colleague Kate Marshall (played by Birthistle). Winchester describes Stonebridge as "dedicated, disciplined, always plays by the rules and often saves the day. Stonebridge directs his energy trying to protecting others," though as the story unfolds, the audience would see that Stonebridge "is not the knight in shining armour."

Sullivan Stapleton plays Damien Scott, a former United States Delta Force operator who is familiar with the antagonists of the second series, and an acquaintance of John Porter. He is recruited by Section 20 to help Sergeant Michael Stonebridge find and rescue the kidnapped Porter. Stapleton describes Scott as cocky, rebellious and arrogant, and that it was good to have somebody like him in Section 20 because "he is the one that usually goes in first and takes the bullets, whereas Stonebridge arrives at the last minute and saves the day." The actor opined that Scott is chosen for the dangerous role because he is daring and does not have any immediate family members who rely on him. Of Scott and Stonebridge's working relationship, Stapleton said "they have a professional respect for each other" but start to annoy each other. When the actor first read the script for Project Dawn, he saw himself for the role as Scott. Because Stapleton is an Australian actor, he had to speak with an American accent throughout the series. He was wary whether he did it right because he barely worked with Americans on the show, but believed he did okay when HBO, the network that operated Cinemax, was satisfied with it. Stapleton has signed up for another Strike Back series should it be commissioned.

Amanda Mealing plays Colonel Eleanor Grant, a "smart, tough military leader who is skilled with a gun and diplomacy, but knows when to break a rule or two." She is the new head of Section 20, replacing Hugh Collinson from the first series. Mealing described Grant as "hard as nails," "very contained, very direct," and "very driven." Grant is also very distant from her team; "she commands so she is not their pal but, at the same time, the guys are like her family. They spend so much time together moving from place to place. But, in a kind of motherly way, she has to keep them in check and sometimes they need a firm hand." The actress called her role "the best role I've ever had," adding "when I'm doing action scenes like flying in helicopters, the hardest thing is to keep a serious face as all I want to do is scream for joy." She researched for her role by taking advice from a female officer in a similar high-ranking position as Grant is. One piece of advice the officer gave Mealing was "you mustn't try to be one of the boys or they'll lose respect for you, but you've got to be in charge."

Eva Birthistle plays Captain Kate Marshall, a "crack commando" who oversees Section 20's military personnel. She and Stonebridge have an affair. The actress was taken by the script, and although she was cast for the role, she had not done action in her past acting career, and felt it would be a "fun experience" to play the character. When Birthistle went through military training, her goal was "just to keep up with everybody and not give up, pass out, throw up or cry." Rhashan Stone plays Major Oliver Sinclair, Grant's right-hand man who helps her gather intelligence. Mealing called their working relationship as "very strong" and "simpatico." Sinclair is the section's second-in-command. Michelle Lukes plays Sergeant Julia Richmond, one of the newer recruits of Section 20. Lukes describes her character as "exceptionally bright and technically brilliant," with the ability to speak seven languages. Jimi Mistry plays the antagonist Latif, the terrorist mastermind behind Project Dawn. Richard Armitage returns as John Porter, the protagonist of the original Strike Back series, in the first episode. Originally, Armitage's role in the series was not clarified when production was announced. In January 2011, the Herald Sun reported he dropped out of the series because he would be playing Thorin Oakenshield in The Hobbit films. However, it was later reported he would return for the second series in a secondary rather than primary role.

== Production ==
=== Development ===
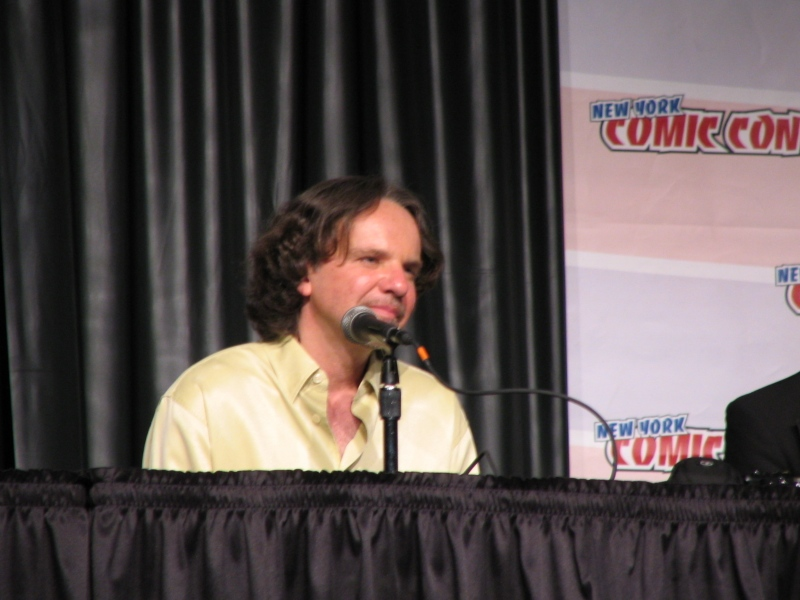
Frank Spotnitz wrote the first four episodes of Strike Back: Project Dawn.

Strike Back began as a six-part series from Sky1, based on a book of the same name from former Special Air Service (SAS) soldier turned novelist Chris Ryan. It transmitted two episodes weekly from 5 to 19 May 2010. The first two episodes more than tripled Sky1's audience share in its timeslot in the past three months. In August 2010, Sky1 controller Stuart Murphy commissioned a second series to consist of a longer run of ten episodes. Left Bank Pictures continued their role as the production company. In February 2011, it was announced that Sky entered a co-production deal with the American television network Cinemax, as the network wanted to introduce new drama series. Strike Back became one of two television projects to be produced by British and American networks in 2011, the other being Torchwood: Miracle Day, which was produced between the BBC and Starz.

Frank Spotnitz, Richard Zajdlic, Tony Saint and Simon Burke were contracted as the series writers, while Alex Holmes, Bill Eagles, Paul Wilmshurst and Daniel Percival serve as the series directors. Andy Harries and Elaine Pyke were the show's executive producers, with Percival and Spotnitz working as Co-Executive Producers. In addition, Michael Casey, Trevor Hopkins and Sue De Beauvoir were the series producers, with Bill Shepard serving as co-producer. Spotnitz wrote the first episodes. He was approached to write for the series because the producers needed somebody to reimagine the show as Armitage was committed to The Hobbit in New Zealand, by introducing two new leads. Spotnitz described the process; "We had this great format, this great world of 'Strike Back' and then we had to imagine who were the new characters who were going to drive the show in the second year." Before Project Dawn was even announced, the crew were scouting for locations in South Africa, where the first series was shot, as well as investigating other parts of the world including the United States, South America, and Europe.

=== Training ===
"We went on an overnight military tactical mission. The men that trained us really put us through it. I slept in my kit because I knew they were going to wake us up in the middle of the night and make us run up the hill."

— Sullivan Stapleton on the training

Before filming began, several of the main cast members were sent to a boot camp in South Africa and went through intensive and rigorous military training by former SAS and SBS soldiers. Stapleton and Winchester had more training than Birthistle, who just wanted to make sure she could at least be a believable soldier. The actors were trained in several aspects including running, teamwork, and weapons. Mealing, meanwhile, did not go through as much training as the other actors, but did spend mornings training with a commander for the SBS who is also a military adviser on the show. Winchester recalled, "Sully and I would meet every morning at 6am. We would run to a chosen location and on the way we had to memorise street names and directions and then our trainers would say 'that car that you just passed what was the licence plate number?' Our trainers were ex-SAS guys who made us study everything in detail, for example, we learnt step by step how to enter a room in twos, then alone. At the same time, we had to be constantly aware of where our weapon was trained."

The physical trainers also had to ensure that not only did the actors look like soldiers before filming, but also to keep them looking that way throughout the shoot. In addition, Stapleton and Winchester had to lose and gain weight, respectively. Winchester had to be on a diet of 4,000 calories a day, which included taking protein shakes between meals. The actor described the diet as "a workout in itself", having found it "exhausting" eating more food than he was used to. In total, training took approximately one month.

=== Filming ===
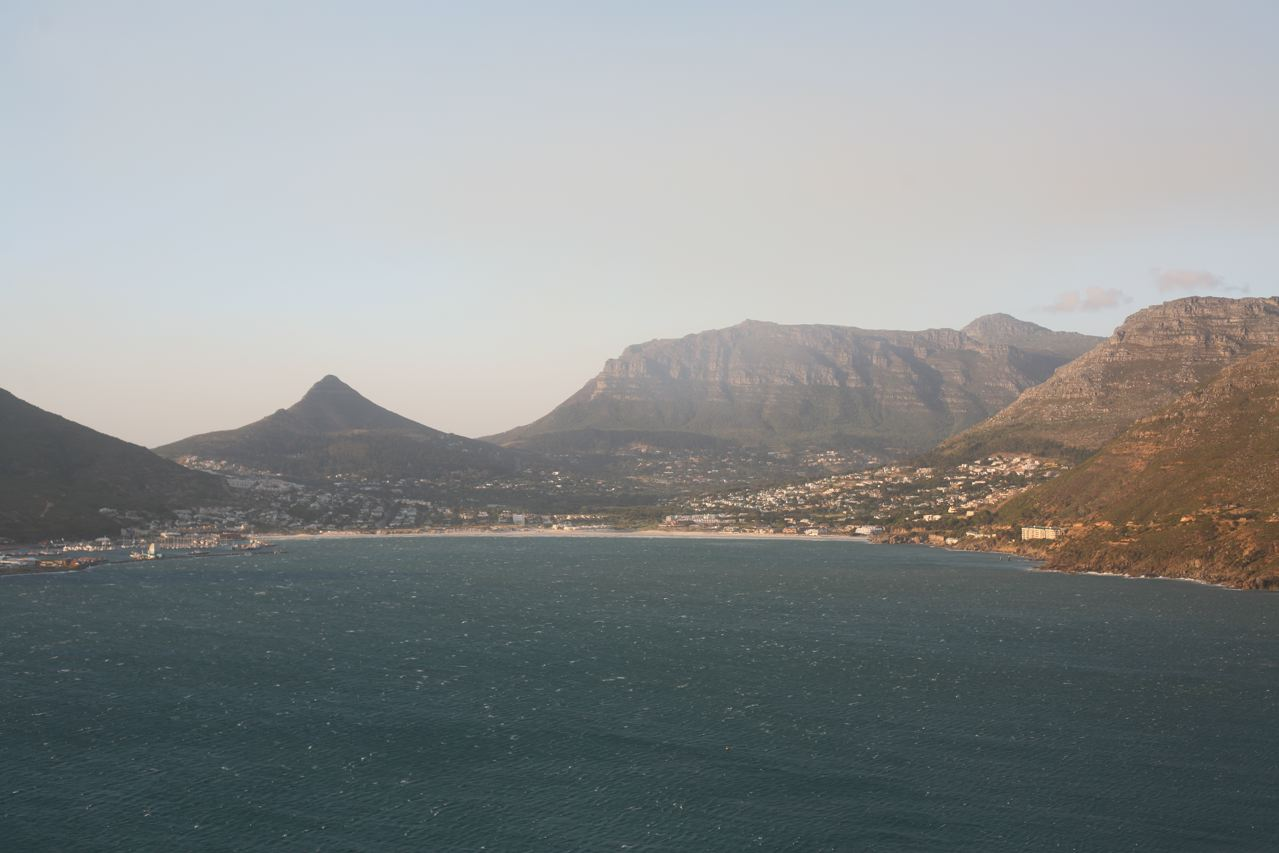
The series was largely filmed in Cape Town, South Africa, with some scenes being shot in the suburb of Hout Bay (pictured).

Filming began in February 2011, and concluded in the late summer (from the Northern Hemisphere's perspective). Filming largely took place in South Africa, particularly in Cape Town, but also in Durban and Springbok, Northern Cape. Outside South Africa the series was also filmed in Budapest, Hungary, and the UK. Among the separate locations the series takes place in, the New Delhi hotel in the first two episodes were shot in Cape Town, and the suburbs of Hout Bay doubled as Mozambique. Throughout the shoot the actors were allowed to perform the majority of their own stunts. Military advisors were on hand to teach the actors how to perform certain stunts, and to tell them what they did wrong during the take. The series includes a number of sex scenes, many of which were performed by Stapleton. In an interview with the British newspaper Metro, the actor stated "I've done my fair share of nude scenes in the past but not as much as this – not as risqué, anyway," adding that while he got used to it, he was always "a bit nervous running around in front of 50 people with no clothes on. The sex scenes were usually with an actress I'd just met, so it's like: 'How's it going? I'm Sullivan and this is me nude.' It's nerve-racking at first but you have as much fun as you can with it."

== Release ==
=== Broadcast and ratings ===
Project Dawn began broadcasting on 12 August 2011 in the United States. The first telecast at 10 pm was seen by 567,000 viewers, while the 11 pm and midnight encores almost doubled viewership, adding 500,000, giving a total of nearly 1.1 million viewers. Although Cinemax is available in 16.7 million homes at the time of the broadcast, it was the best ratings performance for the network since a broadcast of the film Titanic in 2005. It was also on-par with the pilot of the Starz series Spartacus: Blood and Sand in 2010, which also aired on the same timeslot. In the United Kingdom, the series began broadcast on 21 August 2011. The first episode, airing at 9 pm was seen by a total of 616,000 viewers, with an audience share of 2.6 per cent. As far as overnight ratings are concerned, it performed better than the first episode of the previous series, which was seen by 398,000, and a 1.7 per cent audience share.

=== Home video release ===
Project Dawn was released on both DVD and Blu-ray Disc, published by 2entertain, in the United Kingdom on 14 November 2011. It was released with an "18" British Board of Film Classification (BBFC) certificate (indicating it is unsuitable for viewers under the age of 18 years). Special features include Top Secrets: Making Strike Back: Project Dawn, Firearms Training and Scott Vs Igor Fight Scene featurettes, as well as broadcast titles. In the United States the series was released on DVD and Blu-ray on 7 August 2012, with the inclusion of audio commentaries by Daniel Percival.

== Critical reactions ==
=== United States ===
"If something has been missing from your TV screen since "24" went off the air, like an unapologetic, fist-pumping, nonstop action thriller with compelling good guys and loathsome bad guys, Cinemax's new "Strike Back" needs to be your appointment television for the next 10 weeks. It would be plenty good enough if "Strike Back" were just a TV reincarnation of all those Steven Seagal action flicks from a few years back. Because, sadly, the industry seems to have given up on that kind of popcorn thriller, figuring the audience either prefers special effects or is playing video games."

— David Hinkley, New York Daily News

The American review site Metacritic rated the series a 64 out of 100, indicating "generally favorable" reviews from 12 critics. David Hinkley of the New York Daily News rated it four stars out of five, stating it is "a little cartoonish in the same way Seagal or Arnold Schwarzenegger action movies were cartoonish, exaggerating characters and action. But "Strike Back" also differs sharply and significantly in that the villains here aren't the random abstract caricatures from those films, like throwback Nazis or Jamaican drug lords," adding that the villains give the series "an added level of intensity, because we have a more visceral sense of the potential consequences." Linda Stasi of the New York Post rated it three out of four stars, summing up the series as; "Good action, good characters and, besides, it's the only show in the history of TV where the term, "[fucking prick]" is code. I mean, you gotta love that, no?"

Aaron Riccio of Slant Magazine also rated it three out of four stars, stated "Strike Back isn't brilliant television, but it's plenty entertaining, and by fitting the action of 24 with the grit of The Unit (and the nudity of Cinemax), it fills a .22 caliber hole in American television." However, Riccio added that the downside to the series was that "not enough time is given over to the fractious "buddy-cop" relationship between the two main characters, Scott and Stonebridge, whereas quite a bit of time is spent with the villains." Hank Stuever of The Washington Post called it "surprisingly stylish and addictive," adding "Fans of "24," which bowed last year, still ask me how to fill that void. They want just enough intelligence-agency hooey to make the unbelievable seem somewhat real. Until "Strike Back," I didn't have a good answer." Stuever lauded Scott and Stapleton's portrayal, stating he is "the real find here, a thoroughly unlikable loser" who "saves the show from a dour sense of duty," adding that Stapleton "seems to have been created in a laboratory experiment that grafted Ewan McGregor's personality and smile onto Hugh Jackman's body – with more than adequate results."

Matt Fowler of IGN rated it seven out of ten, noting that American viewers do not have to see the first series to be caught up, but added "British fans might lament the absence of Richard Armitage's John Porter who was the ass-kicking hero of the original series." Mike Hale of The New York Times described the series as a "variation on "24" that offers reasonably competent action scenes, depressingly casual depictions of torture and death, and a comic-book conspiracy story line while also being an efficient nudity delivery system." Brent MacKnight rated the series five out of ten, calling it a "decent enough action yarn with slick production values," but was critical that the series was "more concerned with gratuitous nudity [...] each episode includes a lifetime's worth of breasts and butt cheeks–than creating a story with any substance, character, or emotional weight." Rob Owen of the Pittsburgh Post-Gazette was more critical of the series, stating "At first, "Strike Back" seems like a highbrow series on the order of "[Spooks]," but after a few minutes it "conforms to the Skinemax nickname with a graphic sex scene," with "multiple exclamations of the f-word and bloodshed galore." Owen summed "Strike Back shows off high production values and an intense, fast-paced story reminiscent of 24 or Sleeper Cell that occasionally dips into the ridiculous [...] It's too bad the show's graphic nature, especially the bloodshed, is so off-putting as to make the series unwatchable."

=== United Kingdom ===
After the series premiered in the United Kingdom, British critics were mixed in their reviews. Jonathan Bernstein of The Guardian gave the series a positive review, stating "It's awesome! Everything that's capable of exploding explodes. What was a decent but unexceptional military action show is now Naked 24." Jonathan Angwin of CultBox rated it three out of five stars, called it "the body of Spooks with very little of the brains," adding that the series is "silly, immature, shocking, but undoubtedly entertaining and certainly not boring." Patrick Samuel of Static Mass also rated Project Dawn three out of five stars, stating that the main story was "an intriguing one with implications of a conspiracy deep within MI6," but was critical that the series mostly focused on Scott rather than the other main characters, the movement of the storyline, and that Scott and Stonebridge "seemed to be most inapt pair to lead missions as they blow their cover on several occasions, endangering others." However, Samuel praised the series' action sequences, saying that they "[did] not disappoint."

Paul Dean of Faded Glamour believed that Strike Back "remains pretty good at what it does—providing Sky viewers with their weekly Die Hard fix," adding "series two won't win any new converts, but it looks very much like it will continue to serve up the same pacey, unpretentious and unambiguous action as its predecessor." Jack Foley of IndieLondon rated it 2.5 out of five. Foley felt the death of Porter in the first episode was "striking" since Armitage was the "main reason for watching." The reviewer also believed that while the first series "offered a keen mix of Spooks and 24 that expertly blended top-drawer action with some emotional complexity and intrigue," the second series "already feels inferior to both by virtue of the fact that its brains appear to lie in its pants, or blown from Porter's head." Keith Watson of Metro stated that Project Dawn was merely "gung-ho nonsense."
