= Bomber (2009 film) =

- Theatrical release poster
- Directed by: Paul Cotter
- Written by: Paul Cotter
- Produced by: Maureen A. Ryan
- Starring: Shane Taylor; Benjamin Whitrow; Eileen Nicholas
- Cinematography: Rick Siegel
- Edited by: Matt Maddox
- Music by: Stephen Coates
- Release date: 14 March 2009 (SXSW)
- Running time: 84 minutes
- Country: United Kingdom
- Language: English

Bomber is a 2009 British comedy-drama film directed and written by Paul Cotter and starring Shane Taylor, Benjamin Whitrow, and Eileen Nicholas. The plot is about an 83-year-old man returning to Germany for a long-planned journey of atonement.

== Plot ==
Lovelorn art school graduate Ross is down in the dumps when his 83-year-old father announces plans for a family road trip to Germany. During World War II, Ross's father accidentally bombed a small German town and he's regretted the mistake ever since. He's determined to make amends but getting to Germany won't be easy, because it's been years since father and son have exchanged a kind word. Along the way, they learn to be better, more compassionate people.

== Awards and reception ==
Bomber premiered at the 2009 SXSW (South by Southwest) Film Festival in the Narrative Competition. The film subsequently appeared at film festivals across the world, including Filmfest München, Torino, Raindance, Mill Valley, and Gothenburg. Along the way, Bomber picked up these awards:

- Winner, Best Director, Savannah Film Festival
- Winner, Best Feature, Sonoma International Film Festival
- Winner, Best Feature, San Luis Obispo Film Festival
- Winner, Best Feature and Audience Award, Estes Park Film Festival
- Winner, Best Feature, 540 Film Festival
- Winner, Best UK Feature, Falstaff International Film Festival
- Winner, Best Actress, BendFilm
- Winner, Best Actress, Nashville Film Festival
- Winner, Best Actress, Kyiv International Film Festival
- Honoree, New Director's Grand Jury Prize, Nashville Film Festival
- Runner-up, Best Feature, Anchorage International Film Festival
- Nominee, Best Micro-Budget Feature, Raindance
