= Strike Back: Vengeance =

Season of television series

- Blu-ray cover for the series.
- No. of episodes: 10

Release
- Original network: Sky1; Cinemax
- Original release: 17 August – 12 October 2012

Series chronology
- ← Previous; Project Dawn Next → Shadow Warfare

Strike Back: Vengeance, as it is known in the United Kingdom, is a ten-part British action television serial and is the third installment of Strike Back. The main cast for the series includes Philip Winchester, Sullivan Stapleton, Rhona Mitra, Michelle Lukes, Rhashan Stone, Liam Garrigan, Charles Dance, Shane Taylor and Vincent Regan. In the series, Section 20 are on the hunt for four nuclear triggers, which are in the hands of billionaire and philanthropist Conrad Knox (Dance), across continental Africa. In the meantime, Michael Stonebridge (Winchester) wants to avenge his wife's murder, and Damian Scott (Stapleton) contends with a past acquaintance.

Vengeance was commissioned by Sky1 and Cinemax (the second year since Cinemax was brought on board to co-produce the show) in October 2011. The series began filming in January 2012 and took place across South Africa. It premiered in the United States on 17 August 2012, and later in the United Kingdom on 2 September. Viewership averaged 310,000 for Cinemax and 770,000 for Sky1. Critical reactions of Strike Back: Vengeance were generally positive. Vengeance was released on DVD in Region 2 on 5 November 2012 and in Region 1 on 6 August 2013.

== Episodes ==
No.	Title	Directed by	Written by	U.S. air date	U.S. viewers (millions)	U.K. air date	U.K. viewers (millions)
17	Episode 1	Bill Eagles	Tony Saint	17 August 2012	0.390	2 September 2012	0.770
Diplomat Patrick Burton (Tim Pigott-Smith), junior attaché Rachel McMillan (Mitra) and Libyan civil servant Keemal are kidnapped by Somali warlord Huseyin Waabri. As Damian Scott (Stapleton) is sent to rescue them, Keemal is revealed to be in possession of four nuclear triggers, and bargains them for his freedom. However, during the trade mercenaries Karl Matlock (Regan) and Jessica Kohl (Natalie Becker) kill Keemal, compromising Scott's position, leading to his capture. Meanwhile, Sergeant Michael Stonebridge (Winchester) adapts to his new career training recruits, while his wife Kerry (Alexandra Moen) has to deal with a miscarriage. During a live-ammunition training exercise, Stonebridge is forced to kill Jake Hanson, who has posttraumatic stress from his tours in Afghanistan, when he breaks down and attempts to kill the other recruits. After learning of Scott's capture, Stonebridge and Sergeant Julia Richmond (Lukes) volunteer to rescue him. The operation is initially successful; however, they are surprised to learn that McMillan has military training.
18	Episode 2	Bill Eagles	Tony Saint	17 August 2012	0.390	9 September 2012	0.749
"McMillan", real name Rachel Dalton, is revealed to be a military intelligence operative assigned to intercept the nuclear triggers. Knowing of the escape, Waabri places a bounty on their heads. He also meets Matlock who offers to buy the triggers. The escapees confiscate the triggers, but unknown to them they have been swapped by Waabri's girlfriend (who is murdered after handing them over to Waabri's contact). Furthermore, their inbound rescue helicopter is forced to turn back after taking heavy ground fire. They are surrounded by Waabri's militia when they are "rescued" by Matlock's helicopter. Scott trades the triggers for Waabri; however, Matlock discovers the fake triggers and kills Waabri. The group are ambushed by the militia again, until they are rescued by an African Union peacekeeping unit. However, in the process Burton dies. It is revealed Matlock is taking orders from billionaire Conrad Knox (Dance) in Cape Town, South Africa. Back in the UK, Dalton is promoted to lead Section 20. Craig Hanson (Shane Taylor), Jake's brother and Stonebridge's friend, now a mercenary, avenges his brother's death by murdering Kerry.
19	Episode 3	Paul Wilmshurst	James Dormer	24 August 2012	0.333	16 September 2012	0.725
Stonebridge is reassigned to Section 20, though he desires to kill Hanson. Section 20, meanwhile, learn that the triggers are in Niger, in the hands of Othmani (Saïd Taghmaoui). Their first lead to a compound is sidetracked by a Central Intelligence Agency (CIA) air strike. Scott is briefly taken by the CIA, and gets reacquainted with Christy Bryant (Stephanie Vogt), who has a history with him. Section 20 follow Othmani to a hotel in Niamey. He evades them, but is soon tracked again to the Algerian border where he is captured by Tuareg warriors. The matriarchal leader Markunda (Laëtitia Eïdo) plans to auction Othmani between the British and El Soldat, Othmani's brother who plans to buy the triggers. However, El Soldat's men attempt to take Othmani by force, but are stopped by Scott and Stonebridge. They believe the triggers are on a bus, but as they intercept it, El Soldat's men arrive, forcing Scott and Stonebridge to abandon the search and escape.
20	Episode 4	Paul Wilmshurst	James Dormer	31 August 2012	0.266	23 September 2012	0.693
Scott, Stonebridge, Markunda and Othmani are holed up in a farmhouse in the Algerian Hoggar Mountains. As the local farmer patches up Othmani, El Soldat's men arrive and destroy their transport. After Scott and Stonebridge defeat the first wave of attackers, they wait until nightfall to escape. However, they are prevented from doing so by Matlock and Kohl. Meanwhile, Major Oliver Sinclair (Stone) learns that Dalton had a sexual relationship with Othmani while working in intelligence. After meeting Bryant, Dalton learns that El Soldat plans to betray Othmani after gaining his hands on the triggers. After talking with Othmani, he reveals that he had the triggers with him the entire time. A second wave of El Soldat's men attacks the house. Othmani, realising that Dalton told the truth about his brother, blows himself and his brother up. However, Matlock and Kohl confiscate the triggers. Hanson arrives in Cape Town to work for Knox.
21	Episode 5	Julian Holmes	Richard Zajdlic	7 September 2012	0.325	30 September 2012	0.751
Section 20 return to Cape Town to recover former nuclear weapons scientist Peter Evans (Paul Freeman) after his daughter and grandson are kidnapped. Evans and the team narrowly escape the airport past Matlock and the Mossad. Dalton learns that Evans worked with the Israelis on a South African nuclear weapons programme back during the apartheid period, and Matlock wants him to build weapons from the nuclear triggers. The Section are later made aware that Knox is masterminding the operation, after discovering that a gun from one of Matlock's men matches one from Rwanda, supposedly decommissioned by Knox's humanitarian foundation, as well as finding photographs of him and Evans' partner John Devers, who was killed by Mossad. After failing to rescue the hostages in Cape Town Stadium, Scott and Stonebridge returns to Evans, where a Mossad team ambush their safe house. Scott realises that the lead female agent Rebecca Levi (Lyne Renée) placed a tracking device on him when they had sex earlier in the episode. He splits off from Stonebridge and Evans. However, Stonebridge splits off when he spots Hanson and fires at him, allowing Matlock to capture Evans.
22	Episode 6	Julian Holmes	Richard Zajdlic	14 September 2012	0.263	7 October 2012	0.736
Hanson escapes Stonebridge's clutches. Rebecca turns down Scott's offer to join forces and rescue Evans and his family. Evans, meanwhile, is taken to Knox to rig the triggers into four nuclear bombs, with the intent on liberating Africa, "to a point where its voice is not just heard but listened to". Stonebridge meets Ava (Olivia Grant), Knox's daughter, as a shipment of weapons from Sierra Leone is rerouted to the docks instead of Knox's decommission facilities, to convince her of her father's corrupt dealings. Section 20 report the shipment to the local police; however, when the police raid, Scott is arrested before he can shoot Hanson. Realising that Stonebridge is telling the truth, Ava tells him about one of Knox's facilities. Section 20 raid the facility, and although the hostages are rescued, the mercenaries escape with the nuclear weapons. As the hostages are taken to safety, Rachel kills Evans. To prevent deportation from South Africa by corrupt official Joseph Dreyer (Nick Reding), who is in league with Knox, Dalton decides that Section 20 should go dark in order to catch him.
23	Episode 7	M. J. Bassett	John Simpson	21 September 2012	0.358	14 October 2012	0.885
Matlock's team performs a prison break of political prisoner and friend of Knox Walter Lutulu (Eamonn Walker) in Zimbabwe. Section 20 follow Lutulu's activist daughter Lilian (Tracy Ifeachor), who is also being followed by members of the CIO, Zimbabwe's secret police. Kohl takes Lilian and sends her to her father. Lutulu discovers that Knox has nuclear weapons, and is angered. Dreyer learns of Section 20's activities and has the team arrested, save for Scott and Stonebridge who are out, by Knox's mercenaries, and sent to an abandoned prison run by former Recces (South African Special Forces) where Sinclair is killed. Dalton breaks her teammates free and attempt an escape, later aided by Scott and Stonebridge. Richmond kills Dreyer. Bryant is seen meeting Knox. Later, Lutulu headlines a public speech, where an assassination attempt is made on him. As Scott helps in sending him to a hospital, Stonebridge catches the shooter, and they hide from an angry mob in an empty precinct.
24	Episode 8	M. J. Bassett	John Simpson	28 September 2012	0.310	21 October 2012	0.849
As an angry mob gathers outside the precinct, Stonebridge comes across the lone police officer there. When reinforcements arrive, Stonebridge realises that it is Kohl and a partner in disguise. Stonebridge kills them, but in retaliation, Matlock attacks the precinct, kills the shooter and captures Stonebridge. Meanwhile, at a hospital, two doctors are revealed to be assassins and finish off Lutulu. After Scott and Lilian escape Hanson's team, Matlock calls Scott for a trade: Stonebridge for Lilian. Realising that Knox is involved with her father's death, she agrees to it. At Knox's camp, she reads her father's journal that mentions Knox has nuclear weapons. She secretly meets Scott to reveal Knox's location. As they assault the camp, Lilian shafts Knox in the press. Knox escapes; however, Scott and Stonebridge intercept one of the nuclear weapons.
25	Episode 9	Bill Eagles	Tony Saint	5 October 2012	0.235	28 October 2012	0.821
Knox hires corrupt lawyer Christian Lucas (Nyasha Hatendi) to help sell one of the remaining weapons to a Nigerian militia. Section 20 track the weapon outside Johannesburg. However, as Scott and Stonebridge chase the truck, the driver is fired upon by local police; the crash results in the truck's explosion, causing radiation to leak. Stonebridge realises that his desire for revenge is distracting him. As a result of the leak, Section 20 is now assisted by South African authorities. Bryant also offers assistance, but Dalton turns her down, and Scott warns her she is not to be trusted. Scott and Stonebridge find a link between Knox and Lucas. After saving him from gangsters, they plant a tracker on Lucas for his next meeting with Knox. However, it becomes apparent that Bryant told Knox about Lucas. Stonebridge gives chase to a fleeing Hanson as Scott follows Bryant. Stonebridge corners Hanson, but he is forced to stand down after they are surrounded by police officers, and Hanson is arrested instead. Knox kills Lucas.
26	Episode 10	Bill Eagles	Tony Saint	12 October 2012	0.249	4 November 2012	0.826
Scott confronts Bryant in her safe house, where she reveals that she has her own plan to stop Knox, after which she believes that the CIA, who disavowed her, will reinstate her. She promises to reveal the location of the meeting place between Knox and the Nigerians. When Scott returns to Section 20, he reveals that she was his handler when he worked several contract killings in 2005 until he killed a target's child. Bryant reveals the meeting place, but during the raid Knox, Matlock and the Nigerian leader escapes. Section 20 realises that Knox intends to detonate the remaining bombs under his father's old bank. In the meantime Hanson escapes police custody and kills Matlock when he is no longer committed to the mission. Dalton spots Knox, who reveals he is holding a dead man's trigger. Scott and Stonebridge find the two bombs, and are instructed to defuse them at the same time. However, they are held up by the Nigerians and Hanson, respectively. Scott dispatches the Nigerians, and Stonebridge kills Hanson. They then both manage to defuse the bombs just before Knox could detonate them. Knox shoots Dalton before killing himself for his failure. Dalton survives, and four days later, makes a deal with Whitehall to continue Section 20's operation.

== Cast and characters ==
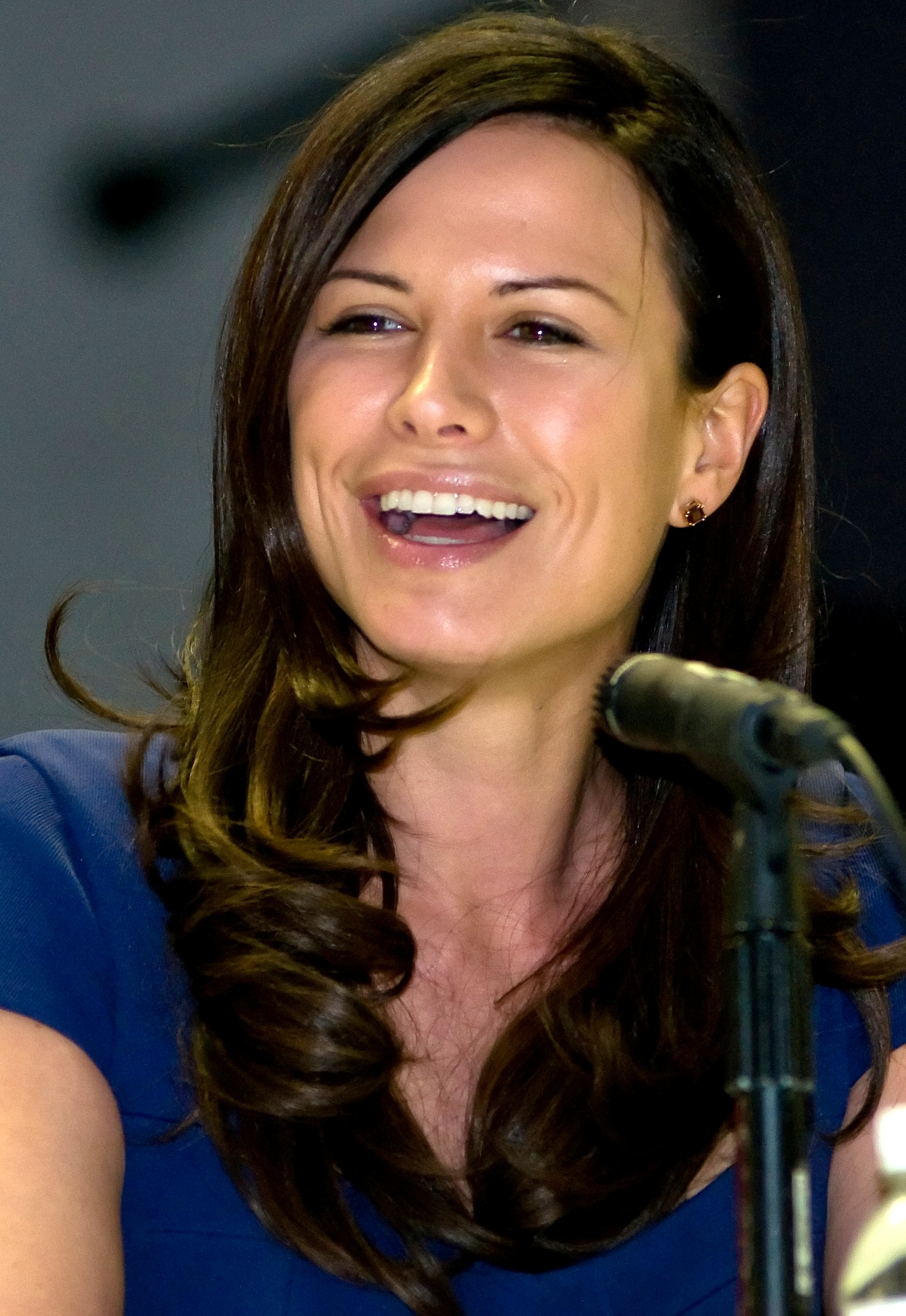
Rhona Mitra replaced Amanda Mealing's role as head of Section 20 following Colonel Grant's death in the conclusion of Strike Back: Project Dawn.

Philip Winchester returns as Sergeant Michael Stonebridge. At the conclusion of the second series, his wife became pregnant, and he was contemplating leaving the service to raise his child, the third series would follow the aftermath of his decision. Winchester states that in the beginning of the series, something happens to Stonebridge, and as a result the character becomes darker, which carries throughout the series. Sullivan Stapleton also returns as Stonebridge's partner, former Delta Force operator Damian Scott. Stapleton was originally contracted to appear in the show for two years after joining Strike Back. Rhashan Stone also returns as Major Oliver Sinclair, and Michelle Lukes as Sergeant Julia Richmond. Richmond becomes more involved in the field in Vengeance. Liam Garrigan plays Section 20 officer Sergeant Liam Baxter.

In January 2012 it was announced that Rhona Mitra was cast as Captain (promoted to major) Rachel Dalton, replacing Colonel Eleanor Grant (Amanda Mealing) as head of Section 20 following her death at the conclusion of Project Dawn. Mitra described the character's role as the leader of Section 20 as "she's not mum, she's not auntie, she's like sister, and it's like a sister coming to tell the brothers what to do," as well as being like "a lioness who's been dropped in amongst silverbacks." Mitra found the experience to be "intellectually, physically and creatively" stimulating.

Charles Dance plays Conrad Knox, the series' primary antagonist. Knox is using his organisation, to clean the streets of Africa by taking away its weapons, as a front to arm his own militia. Vincent Regan plays mercenary Karl Matlock, Knox's "task man," and Natalie Becker plays sniper and Matlock's partner Jessica Kohl. The South African television and radio personality had to learn how to put together, fire, and reload six different firearms. Stephanie Vogt recurs as Christy Bryant, a Central Intelligence Agency (CIA) operative who holds "big dark" secrets over Scott. Shane Taylor recurs as Craig Hanson, a character who worked with Stonebridge before the latter joined Section 20.

== Production ==
=== Development ===
Strike Back began with a six-part first series developed by BSkyB, and broadcast two episodes a week from 5 to 19 May 2010 on Sky1. It was based on a book of the same name from former Special Air Service (SAS) soldier turned novelist Chris Ryan. A second series with a longer run of ten episodes, Strike Back: Project Dawn, was commissioned by Sky in August 2010, and in February 2011, it was announced that Sky entered a co-production deal with the American television network Cinemax. On 6 October 2011, Cinemax announced they renewed the show for a ten-part third series (or second season in the United States). Sky1 announced the renewal one day later.

Tony Saint returned to write a number of episodes as well as co-executive produce the series, while Bill Eagles and Paul Wilmshurst returned to direct; Eagles directed four episodes, while Wilmshurst directed two. Julian Holmes directed episodes five and six, and film director M. J. Bassett also directed two episodes of the series. Andy Harries and Huw Kennair-Jones executive produced the series. The series also included consultants who work in counterterrorism, who provided insight into the environment.

=== Training ===
Like the preceding series, the cast were trained by former special forces officers. Stapleton was allowed to perform some stunt driving. Lukes meanwhile, spent three and a half weeks training as her character would be more involved out in the field. Some cast members felt they went in with more responsibility for Vengeance; Realising that some of the fans and military officers pointed out some procedural errors in Project Dawn, the cast were more accurately trained to correct them.

=== Filming ===
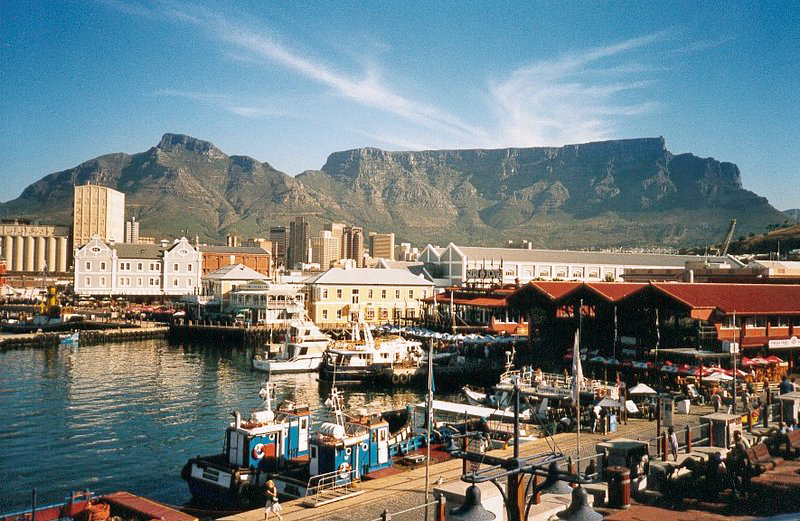
Filming mostly took place in Cape Town (pictured) and Western Cape, South Africa.

Filming began in South Africa in January 2012. The first block of two episodes were originally set to be shot primarily in the neighbouring country of Mozambique. However, one week beforehand, there was a "freedom fighter rally" that took place in the country, and the production staff had to rethink their strategy, as they felt that it would be unsafe to film action sequences while civilians were using live weapons. However, two days were spent filming some interior scenes in Mozambique, but the cast were not allowed to carry firearms. The rest of the block resumed filming in Cape Town, and the rest of the series was largely shot in the city, Western Cape, and Johannesburg. Production made use of local civilians to play crowds. In one such instance locals portrayed a group of rioters in the township of Langa in Cape Town.

The cast were able to perform most of their own stunts, although they carried risks. In one particular instance during a shoot on a rooftop, Stapleton and Winchester were singed during a grenade prop stunt. Although both took cover, a whirlwind carried the blast to the actors.

== Release ==
=== Broadcast and ratings ===
In the United States, a promotional trailer was first released on Cinemax's sister network HBO before the fifth season premiere of the popular supernatural drama True Blood. The show premiered on 17 August 2012, showing the first two episodes back-to-back, and continued weekly until the finale on 12 October. The series advertised two songs from the 2012 Bob Dylan album Tempest; "Early Roman Kings" were included in a teaser clip of the show, and "Scarlet Town" was featured in the premiere. Vengeance premiered to 390,000 American viewers, with encores increasing the viewership to over half a million. Ratings for the series premiere was down by approximately half compared with the premiere episode of Project Dawn, which was seen by almost 1.1 million viewers. Vengeance averaged 310,000 viewers, and an 18 to 49 rating of 0.13, on Cinemax.

In the United Kingdom, the series was premiered on Sky1 on 2 September 2012 at 9pm, and continued weekly until 4 November. According to preliminary numbers 385,000 viewed the series premiere, equalling a 1.6 per cent audience share in its timeslot, and became the third most watched non-sports broadcast on pay-TV, behind The Simpsons and Sinbad, which also aired on Sky1. Ratings were down compared with the premiere of Project Dawn, which was seen by 616,000 according to preliminary figures. Final numbers for the Vengeance premiere raised the initial figure to 770,000, though it was still down from the 1.137 million that had seen the Project Dawn premiere.

=== Home video release ===
Vengeance was released on DVD, published by 2entertain, in the United Kingdom on 5 November 2012. It was released with a "15" British Board of Film Classification (BBFC) certificate (indicating it is unsuitable for viewers under the age of 15 years). It will later be released on DVD and Blu-ray Disc in the United States on 6 August 2013, with special features including audio commentaries.

== Critical reactions ==
The American review site Metacritic rated the series a 75 out of 100, indicating "generally favorable" reviews from six critical reviews.
