= Shane Taylor (actor) =

British-American actor (born 1974)

- Born: March 13, 1974 (age 52); Dover, Kent, England
- Occupation: Actor
- Years active: 1999–present

Shane Taylor is a British-American actor, known for appearing in the miniseries Band of Brothers and the serial Strike Back: Vengeance.

== Career ==
Taylor co-starred as the Louisianan medic Eugene Roe in the British-American miniseries Band of Brothers. A relatively minor character in the series, Roe is nevertheless the protagonist of the sixth episode, "Bastogne", which follows his struggles to help the men as they endure frigid conditions, low supplies, and constant enemy fire. Taylor's performance was praised as "a marvel of economy" by Emily St. James of The A.V. Club, who wrote, "Watch how little he moves or speaks, unless he absolutely needs to...He's exactly the right man for this part and for the way that Roe's long slog through this siege begins to feel like an unending nightmare".

In 2009, Taylor starred in the British dark comedy film Bomber as a character who accompanies his elderly father (Benjamin Whitrow) to Germany, as the old man wishes to atone for his actions during World War II. In Strike Back: Vengeance, which aired in 2012, Taylor guest starred as a ruthless mercenary. He described his character as "a mad, bad, crazy lad" and former colleague of Stonebridge (Philip Winchester). While filming his action scenes, Taylor sustained a black eye after accidentally coming into contact with Winchester. Taylor also cracked his rib, causing them to delay filming his final big action scene until the last day of shooting. In 2013, he co-starred in the film Walking with the Enemy.

== Select filmography ==
- All Along the Watchtower (1999)
- Where the Heart Is (1999)
- Dangerfield (1999)
- King of the Bingo Game (short) (1999)
- Room to Rent (2000)
- P.O.V. (2000)
- Band of Brothers (2001)
- Comedy Lab (2004)
- Shinobido (video game) (2005)
- Bomber (2009)
- The Day of the Triffids (2009)
- Devil's Playground (2010)
- Strike Back: Vengeance (2012)
- Walking with the Enemy (2013)
- Quirke (2014)
- Sons of Liberty (2015)
- Hunter Killer (2018)
- The Exorcism of Karen Walker (2018)
