= Rhashan Stone =

American actor

- Born: November 3, 1970 (age 56); Elizabeth, New Jersey, U.S.
- Occupations: Actor, playwright, comedian, singer, composer, musician
- Years active: 1993–present
- Spouse: Olivia Williams (m. 2003)
- Children: 2
- Parent(s): Joanne Stone (mother); Russell Stone (stepfather)
- Relatives: Madeline Bell (aunt)

Rhashan Stone (born November 3, 1970) is an American actor, comedian and musician. He has had main roles in series such as Bodies (2004–2005), Mutual Friends (2008), Strike Back (2010–2012), The Smoke (2014), Ballot Monkeys (2015), Keeping Faith (2019–2021) and Hollington Drive (2021).

== Early life ==
Stone was born in Elizabeth, New Jersey to soul and jazz singer Joanne Stone. When he was six years old, his mother married the British singer/songwriter Russell Stone, and they moved to the UK to live with him. Together, his mother and stepfather formed the singing duo R&J Stone. His aunt Madeline Bell was also involved in the music industry and became the lead singer for Blue Mink. When Stone was 11, his mother died from a brain tumor. In later years, he studied acting at the Mountview Academy of Theatre Arts. Stone is a classically trained singer, musician and composer of jazz, soul and gospel music.

== Career ==
Stone started his stage career in 1991 in As You Like It by Cheek by Jowl at the Albery Theatre. As a stage actor, he has performed in productions for The Royal Shakespeare Company, The National Theatre, the Royal Court Theatre and in London's West End. He played Claudio in Much Ado About Nothing at the Barbican Theatre in 1997, Hero in the Sondheim musical A Funny Thing Happened on the Way to the Forum at Regent's Park Open Air Theatre in 1999, and the king's brother Clarence in Richard III at the Swan Theatre, Stratford-upon-Avon in 2001.

== Personal life ==
Stone married actress Olivia Williams in 2003; the couple have two daughters.

== Filmography ==
Film and television
Year	Title	Role	Notes
1993–1994	Desmonds	Bernie	3 episodes
1996	Goodnight Sweetheart	James T	1 episode
1997	The Detectives	Dr Monk	1 episode
1998	Picking Up the Pieces	Steve	1 episode
2002	Holby City	Craig Campbell	1 episode
2003	The Bill	Paul Sharpe	6 episodes
2003	Wondrous Oblivion	Frank Worrell	Film
2003	The Crouches	Sam	2 episodes
2004–2005	Bodies	Tom Gorman	9 episodes
2005	Perfect Day	Steve	
2006	Perfect Day: The Millennium	Steve	
2007	Casualty	Ken Gilroy	1 episode
2008	Bike Squad	Sgt. Trev Ellington	TV film
2008	Love Soup	Nigel	1 episode
2008	A Deal Is A Deal	Ash	
2008	Mutual Friends	Dev	6 episodes
2008	Outnumbered	Vicar	1 episode
2009	Taking The Flak	Jeremy Morrison	1 episode
2009	Land Girls	Cpl. Willard Lacey	1 episode
2009	Coppers	D.S. Gordon Fenterman	Short film
2009	The Armstrong and Miller Show	Various Characters	1 episode
2010	Dollhouse	Test Subject	1 episode
2011	Episodes	Howard	2 episodes
2009–2011	Horrible Histories	Various	4 episodes
2011	Black Mirror	Jeff	Episode: "The Entire History of You"
2011	Strike Back: Project Dawn	Major Oliver Sinclair	10 episodes
2012	Strike Back: Vengeance	Major Oliver Sinclair	7 episodes
2012	Silk	Ed Marmor	2 episodes
2014	Bluestone 42	Colin Walters, Minister for the Armed Forces	1 episode
2014	The Smoke	Mal Milligan	8 episodes
2015	Ballot Monkeys	Obi	4 episodes
2016	Agatha Raisin	Jez Bloxby	5 episodes
2017	Apple Tree Yard	Robert	2 episodes
2017	Carters Get Rich	Tony Carter	Lead role (6 episodes)
2019–2020	101 Dalmatian Street	Doug	Voice (11 episodes)
2019–2021	Keeping Faith	DI Laurence Breeze; CID detective	Series 2 and 3
2020–present	Rhyme Time Town	Hickory Dickory Dock & Judge Dish	Voice (3 episodes)
2021	McDonald & Dodds	Al	Season 2 Episode 3
2021	Baptiste	Benjamin	2 episodes
2021	The Trick	Gareth Ellmann	TV film
2022	Best & Bester	Guy	
2022	Hollington Drive	Fraser	4 episodes
2023	The Chelsea Detective	Pete McLoud	Season 2 Episode 4
2023	All the Light We Cannot See	French museum foreman	2 episodes
2023	Midsomer Murders	Joel Myhill	"Book of the Dead"
