= Paul Wilmshurst =

British television director (born 1961)

- Born: Paul Dominic Wilmshurst; 15 December 1961 (age 64); London, England
- Occupation: Television Director
- Website: https://www.paulwilmshurst.com

Paul Wilmshurst (born 15 December 1961) is a British television director, producer, and screenwriter. He is known for his work across drama, documentary, and docudrama formats, with credits including Doctor Who, Strike Back, The Last Kingdom (TV series), Hiroshima, and The Day of the Jackal (TV series) (2024).

He has received an International Emmy Award and two BAFTA nominations.

== Early life and education ==
Wilmshurst studied English at Churchill College, Cambridge, followed by a postgraduate diploma in journalism at City University, London. He began his career in journalism before moving into documentary filmmaking.

== Career ==
Wilmshurst started directing documentaries for British television, with early credits including Mob Law (1998), a profile of Las Vegas mob lawyer Oscar Goodman, and White Tribe (2000), presented by Darcus Howe. He also worked on The Gambler (2000) with Jonathan Rendall.

In 2005, he wrote, produced, and directed Hiroshima, a dramatized documentary commemorating the 60th anniversary of the atomic bombing. The programme won the International Emmy Award for Best Documentary and a BAFTA Television Award for Best Visual Effects.

In 2008 Wilmshurst wrote and directed the Channel 4 true-life drama Forgiven for which actress Lucy Cohu won an international Emmy award for Best Actress for her role. The drama was well reviewed at the time and was later listed as one of the 50 Best Television Programmes of the Decade in The Times: "32: Forgiven (2006) It is easy to condemn child abuse. It is much harder to try to understand it, to engage with the abuser and stop it from happening. Paul Wilmshurst's harrowing drama with Lucy Cohu showed unbelievable courage."

Wilmshurst transitioned into directing television drama with credits that include multiple episodes of the BBC's Doctor Who, notably "Kill the Moon", "Mummy on the Orient Express", and the 2014 Christmas special "Last Christmas". He directed episodes of Da Vinci’s Demons, Indian Summers, and The Last Kingdom, as well as five seasons of the action drama Strike Back.

Wilmshurst's work in children's drama includes Combat Kids, which was nominated for a BAFTA, and Runaway (TV serial), a CBBC drama miniseries.

In 2024, Wilmshurst directed three episodes of the Sky/Peacock thriller The Day of the Jackal (TV series), a television adaptation of the novel by Frederick Forsyth. The series, starring Eddie Redmayne and Lashana Lynch, received positive critical reception and several award nominations.

== Awards ==
- International Emmy Award – Best Documentary, Hiroshima (2005)
- BAFTA Television Award – Best Visual Effects, Hiroshima (2005)
- International Emmy Award – Best Actress for Lucy Cohu in Forgiven (2008), directed by Wilmshurst

== Personal life ==
Wilmshurst lives in North London.

== Filmography ==
=== Television ===
Year	Title	Role	Notes
2026	Number One Fan	Director	TV series
2024	The Day of the Jackal (TV series)	Director	Episodes 6, 7 & 8
2024	Belgravia: The Next Chapter	Director	Episodes 1, 2, 3 & 4
2022	The Last Kingdom (TV series)	Director	Episodes 4, 5 & 6
2020	Strike Back: Vendetta	Director	Episodes 1 & 2
2019	Strike Back: Revolution	Director	Episodes 3 & 4
2018	Jamestown (Season 2)	Director	Episodes 1 & 2
2017	Jamestown	Director	Episodes 5 & 6
2016	Indian Summers (Season 2)	Director	Episodes 7, 8, 9 & 10
2015	A.D. The Bible Continues	Director	Episodes 7 & 8
2014	Doctor Who	Director	Kill the Moon; Mummy on the Orient Express; Last Christmas
2013	Strike Back: Shadow Warfare	Director	Episodes 5 & 6
2012	Da Vinci's Demons	Director	Episode 5 "The Tower"; Episode 6 "The Devil"
2012	Strike Back: Vengeance	Director	Episodes 3 & 4
2011	Strike Back: Project Dawn	Director	Episodes 7 & 8
2010	Combat Kids	Director, Producer	Episodes 1, 2 & 3
2010	Law & Order: UK	Director	Shaken
2010	Silent Witness	Director	Home (Parts 1 & 2)
2009	Runaway	Director, Writer, Producer	Episodes 1, 2 & 3
2008	Trial & Retribution	Director	Conviction (Parts 1 & 2)
2007	Forgiven	Director, Writer, Producer	
2006	I Shouldn't Be Alive	Director, Writer, Producer	Kidnapped in the Killing Fields
2005	Hiroshima	Director, Writer, Producer	
2004	Pissed on the Job	Director, Writer, Producer	
2003	Seven Wonders of the Industrial World	Director, Writer, Producer	The Brooklyn Bridge
2003	Dogumentary	Director, Writer, Producer	Rewind the Summer
2001	Frank Skinner on Frank Skinner	Director, Producer	Biography of comedian Frank Skinner
2000	The Gambler	Director	With Jonathan Rendall
2000	White Tribe	Director, Producer	Documentary series with Darcus Howe
2000	Secrets & Lines	Director, Writer, Producer	Inside the world of cocaine dealers
1999	Diceworld	Director, Producer	Documentary series with Luke Rhinehart
1998	A Little Bit of Elvis	Director, Producer	Frank Skinner and Elvis Presley's blue velvet shirt
1998	Mob Law	Director, Writer	A film portrait of Oscar Goodman
