= Strike Back: Shadow Warfare =

- Poster for the series.
- No. of episodes: 10

Release
- Original network: Sky1; Cinemax
- Original release: 9 August – 18 October 2013

Series chronology
- ← Previous; Vengeance Next → Legacy

Strike Back: Shadow Warfare, as it is known in the United Kingdom is a ten-part British action television serial and is the fourth series of Strike Back. It was commissioned by BSkyB and Cinemax on 3 October 2012 and first broadcast on 9 August 2013 on Cinemax and 28 October 2013 on Sky1. Philip Winchester, Sullivan Stapleton, Rhona Mitra, and Michelle Lukes returned as the main cast for the series.

In the series, focus is on Section 20's pursuit of elusive terrorist al-Zuhari, and his cartel partners, across several global locales including Colombia, Beirut, and Europe.

== Episodes ==
No.	Title	Directed by	Written by	U.S. air date	U.S. viewers (millions)	U.K. air date	U.K. viewers (millions)
27	Episode 1	M. J. Bassett	Simon Burke & Tim Vaughan & M. J. Bassett	9 August 2013	0.493	28 October 2013	0.796 (Note: 728,000 on Sky 1, 68,000 on Sky 1+1)
In Lebanon, Section 20 operative Liam Baxter (Liam Garrigan) is compromised and executed. Rachel Dalton (Mitra) investigates who sold out Baxter, leading her to a thought-to-be-dead MI6 agent, Sebastian Grey (Clunes). Damian Scott (Stapleton) and Michael Stonebridge (Winchester) are recalled from holiday to find Baxter's executioner, Leo Kamali (Zubin Varla), a member of a terrorist organisation led by al-Zuhari, in the jungles of Colombia. The two team up with an American Drug Enforcement Administration (DEA) team, led by Kim Martinez (Jackson). Kamali is being sheltered by cartel leader Miguel Gomez (Raoul Trujillo), in his compound. Scott spots Mossad agent Rebecca Levi (Lyne Renée), last seen in Vengeance, posing as Kamali's girlfriend. After capturing Kamali the team kills Viktor Ulyanov, a representative of the Russian mafia, during the escape. They return to their rendezvous to find Martinez's team dead, and are soon ambushed by Gomez's men. Stonebridge manages to hijack an armed riverboat as a getaway vehicle. Though they manage to evade their pursuers, Gomez fires a rocket-propelled grenade at the team from higher ground, destroying the boat.
28	Episode 2	M. J. Bassett	Simon Burke & Tim Vaughan & M. J. Bassett	16 August 2013	0.364	4 November 2013	0.805 (Note: 725,000 on Sky 1, 80,000 on Sky 1+1)
The team survive the blast, but Kamali escapes. Rebecca leads the team to a Stock Exchange in Bogotá, where Kamali has a safe deposit box, to find him. They break in using the exchange's president, also Gomez's brother. After taking the contents of the box, the team contend with local authorities and Gomez's men, resulting in Rebecca's death by Gomez. After Martinez and Julia Richmond (Lukes) locate Kamali's safehouse from the contents, Scott and Stonebridge apprehends Kamali, who claims to be a Central Intelligence Agency (CIA) operative under deep cover to infiltrate al-Zuhari. Scott and Stonebridge are captured and tortured by Gomez after Section 20 learn the CIA did not employ Kamali. Kamali, however, rescues the two, and Scott kills Gomez. In Beirut, Dalton finds and questions Grey, who reveals the name James Leatherby before he is killed by a gunman of al-Zuhari. Dalton is then rescued by Colonel Philip Locke (Green), an SAS legend who is overseeing Section 20. They both later arrive in Colombia and learn from a CIA agent that Kamali is in fact a deniable operative, although Section 20 manage to convince him to work with them or be arrested for Baxter's murder.
29	Episode 3	Julian Holmes	James Dormer	23 August 2013	0.331	11 November 2013	0.781 (Note: 716,000 on Sky 1, 65,000 on Sky 1+1)
In Beirut, Kamali meets Amir, a courier. Amir realises he is being followed by Scott and Stonebridge. Amir's men attack, but Amir is mortally wounded. Scott and Stonebridge blackmail him into revealing that Leatherby (Dougray Scott) is bringing al-Zuhari from Syria. In Moscow, Arkady Ulyanov (Marcel Iureș), Viktor's father, learns of the identities of his son's killers and sends a woman to Beirut to seduce Scott. Kamali meets and pays Leatherby in a casino, but fails to get the location of al-Zuhari's arrival. Section 20 then kidnap Leatherby's boyfriend, who reveals the time and location to an airfield. Stonebridge is unknowingly contaminated while ambushing the landing party. Instead of al-Zuhari, they find a woman named Sophia Abboud (Agni Scott), the daughter of a former Syrian minister of finance. Locke arrives to suspend Dalton following her increasingly erratic behaviour, and abuse of morphine, effectively taking over Section 20. Dalton decides to kidnap Sophia, believing she knows something about al-Zuhari.
30	Episode 4	Julian Holmes	James Dormer	6 September 2013	0.506	18 November 2013	0.726 (Note: 635,000 on Sky 1, 91,000 on Sky 1+1)
Leatherby kidnaps Kamali's daughter Ester (Amy-Leigh Hickman). Section 20 work to rescue her as Locke instructs Kamali to find Dalton, who is interrogating Sophia. Section 20 find Leatherby's compound and rescue Ester, but are later ambushed and cornered by Leatherby's Hezbollah allies. They capture Leatherby's boyfriend in exchange for safe passage. Leatherby complies, but after realising what he has done, shoots his boyfriend and then gets shot and killed by Stonebridge. Dalton meanwhile, learns that Sophia is al-Zuhari's wife. Kamali arrives, posing as a friend of al-Zuhari, and allows her to escape. He and Dalton tail her to an address, but instead of finding al-Zuhari, they find a woman Locke later recognises as Mairead McKenna (Catherine Walker) of the Real Irish Republican Army, who kills Dalton and Sophia and recovers a memory card hidden in Sophia's watch. A Russian mafia hitman arrives in Beirut to follow Scott and Stonebridge, the latter of which is experiencing periods of impaired vision.
31	Episode 5	Paul Wilmshurst	John Simpson	13 September 2013	0.417	25 November 2013	0.732 (Note: 599,000 on Sky 1, 133,000 on Sky 1+1)
Section 20 tracks McKenna to Budapest, Hungary. They capture and interrogate Sean O'Riordan (Francis Magee), an old IRA arms dealer, who reveals the time and location of a secret weapons trade. After he dies in a car accident, Section 20 obtain a flash drive containing a video message from al-Zuhari, which was to be released publicly after a future terrorist attack. McKenna meanwhile, seduces and murders an employee of the British Embassy to obtain access to the building. Scott, Stonebridge and Martinez ambush the weapons trade at a train yard, and McKenna is captured. However, Stonebridge fails to stop the IRA from escaping with the weapons when his impaired vision affects his combat abilities, prompting him to see a doctor. Before McKenna can reveal anything from the interrogation, the embassy is under pressure from the Irish government to extradite her to the UK. However, at the airport the team are ambushed by IRA soldiers, resulting in McKenna's escape, and Locke's capture.
32	Episode 6	Paul Wilmshurst	John Simpson	20 September 2013	0.447	2 December 2013	0.701 (Note: 569,000 on Sky 1, 132,000 on Sky 1+1)
To find Locke, Scott and Stonebridge intimidate Mousawi, al-Zuhari's Hungarian contact. Mousawi reveals Locke is in an abandoned factory used by the IRA and al-Zuhari's men, before they are attacked by the Russian mafia hitman. After killing him, Section 20 successfully rescue Locke, who surmises that McKenna intends to attack a NATO hub. Three of McKenna's vans surround the British Embassy. Although Scott takes out one of the vans, the other two fire mortars at the embassy. In the chaos, an IRA team led by McKenna breaks into the building dressed as medics with the stolen access to clone sensitive NATO information from the secret basement area. Though they succeed in passing the harddrive, Locke captures McKenna for information on the identity of the IRA operative who killed his son twenty years before. Instead, McKenna attempts to shoot Locke, but is killed by Kamali. Later, Richmond manages to track the harddrive to Russia.
33	Episode 7	Stephen Woolfenden	Simon Burke & Ben Newman	27 September 2013	0.309	9 December 2013	0.820 (Note: 689,000 on Sky 1, 131,000 on Sky 1+1)
The NATO harddrive is located in Black Bear Prison outside Moscow, owned by Ulyanov. Section 20 further discover that Ulyanov, who is allied with al-Zuhari, is using Swedish hacker Erik Andersson (Andreas Utterhall), a prisoner, to decrypt the harddrive. To recover it, Scott and Stonebridge get themselves arrested as cocaine dealers and are sent to the prison, where they learn that Andersson is working under duress; his friends are being held hostage. Michael learns that he is infected with a neurotoxin, and has as long as two days to live unless he is injected with an antitoxin. Martinez and Richmond locate and rescue the hostages, but not before Andersson finishes the decryption. Kamali believes that al-Zuhari wants him dead after his car explodes. To rescue Andersson, Scott and Stonebridge start a prison riot, as Federal Security Service (FSB) Major Nina Pirogova (Tereza Srbova) arrives at the prison, apparently to collect Ulyanov's bounty on them, but it is revealed she is working with Locke to break them out. Andersson is being transferred; Stonebridge tries to rescue him, but he too is being taken away in the same van, while Scott and Pirogova are captured by prison guards.
34	Episode 8	Stephen Woolfenden	M. J. Bassett & Tim Vaughan	4 October 2013	0.312	16 December 2013	0.832 (Note: 717,000 on Sky 1, 115,000 on Sky 1+1)
Scott and Pirogova break out while they are being transported to Ulyanov, and are saved from their pursuers by Martinez and Richmond. Meanwhile, Andersson and Stonebridge are taken to a secret biochemical facility in Drezna where scientists are testing prisoners with weaponised smallpox, which al-Zuhari wants to obtain. Stonebridge is deemed useless by the head doctor, Takenaka (Togo Igawa), due to his condition. He manages to kill his captors, however, and learns from Andersson, who is infected with the smallpox, that he tagged all of NATO's cleanskins. After Stonebridge calls Section 20, they and Spetsnaz covertly surround the facility as Kamali arrives using his terrorist cover. After Ulyanov arrives, Section 20 and Spetsnaz raid the facility, where Scott gives Stonebridge the antitoxin. Ulyanov manages to escape with Kamali, whose cover is blown, and a sample of the smallpox. Later, the members of Section 20 watch a video recording of al-Zuhari's men executing Kamali.
35	Episode 9	M. J. Bassett	Richard Zajdlic	11 October 2013	0.400	23 December 2013	0.742 (Note: 622,000 on Sky 1, 120,000 on Sky 1+1)
Section 20 follow al-Zuhari's main enforcer, Qassein (Philip Arditti), to Berlin, Germany. Realising Ester is a target, Scott and Stonebridge rescue her from Qassem at a fair. Meanwhile, from a captured Drezna doctor, Locke learns the facility was funded by Maroun Saleh (Tony Jayawardena), a wealthy businessman. Martinez and Richmond follow him to compound led by Raza Hassan (Fred Maamar Fortas), al-Zuhari's right-hand man. The team attack the compound by night; though Saleh and Hassan are both killed, the team retrieve a flash drive with the identities of the cleanskins. One of them, Colonel Novotny (Iván Fenyö), is posing as a Czech diplomat travelling to Frankfurt to attend a NATO meeting. Scott and Stonebridge intercept him on a train bound for the city. However, Novotny releases the smallpox in one of the carriages. Scott stops the train from approaching a populated area by parking a lorry at a level crossing, where Novotny dies. Afterwards, Scott and Stonebridge find that Ester's safe house is compromised, and the pair are taken hostage by Qassein and Kamali, who faked his death.
36	Episode 10	M. J. Bassett	Richard Zajdlic	18 October 2013	0.436	30 December 2013	0.709 (Note: 622,000 on Sky 1, 87,000 on Sky 1+1)
Kamali reveals that he was the one responsible for the entire plot (al-Zuhari was in fact killed by the Israelis six months before) and is going to release the smallpox as revenge for his wife's death. Scott and Stonebridge escape capture, where Section 20 learns Kamali has implanted several cleanskins to Ramstein Air Base. As one of the cleanskins releases the virus in the hospital wing, infecting Martinez and others, Kamali hijacks an aircraft with the intent of flying over Berlin to release the virus and infect the city. Scott and Stonebridge rescue Richmond, who Kamali captured on the aircraft, before it takes off, where the plane is shot down. Kamali is not on board, and he and Ester are captured by Ulyanov, who demands Scott and Stonebridge turn themselves in, in exchange for Kamali. The exchange goes awry, resulting in Kamali and Ulyanov's deaths, though in his dying moments Kamali tells Ester that the necklace he gave her contains the cure to the virus. Section 20 take the cure to the base, where there is only enough to save those infected at the NATO base.

== Cast ==
Returning cast members for the series include Philip Winchester and Sullivan Stapleton, who return as protagonists Sergeant Michael Stonebridge and ex–Delta Force operative Sergeant Damian Scott, respectively, Rhona Mitra as Major Rachel Dalton, the head of Section 20 in Strike Back: Vengeance, the previous season, Michelle Lukes as Sergeant Julia Richmond, and Liam Garrigan as Sergeant Liam Baxter. Other cast members will be introduced in the series. Robson Green appears as a new member of Section 20, new commanding officer Lieutenant Colonel Philip Locke. Dougray Scott appears as James Leatherby, a rogue operative. Milauna Jackson is introduced as U.S. Drug Enforcement Administration Special Agent Kim Martinez working with Section 20. Zubin Varla plays Leo Kamali, a CIA operative, undercover with a terrorist group, whose loyalties are suspect. Martin Clunes plays Sebastian Grey, a former MI6 officer working in Beirut. Swedish actor Andreas Utterhall portrays a computer genius forced to work for the Russian mafia.

== Production ==
On 3 October 2012, Cinemax and Sky1 announced the renewal of Strike Back for a fourth series, the third with Cinemax's participation. M. J. Bassett, Julian Holmes and Paul Wilmshurst return as directors, whilst Simon Burke, James Dormer, John Simpson and Richard Zajdlic return as series writers. The series was produced by Left Bank Pictures, with company director Andy Harries serving as executive producer, with Michael Casey as series producer. Co-executive producers include Bassett, Dormer and Tim Vaughan, with Selwyn Roberts and Chris Thompson as producers and Bill Shepard as the co-producer. Consultants who work in counterterrorism, return as advisers to provide insight into the environment. Like past seasons, the cast receive military training so that they can perform most of their own stunts. Production of the series began in January 2013, and took six months to complete. Filming began in South Africa, used to double Beirut and Colombia for the first four episodes. The first two episodes features water sequences, which were filmed at the KwaZulu-Natal province. In March 2013, production moved to Budapest, Hungary to double as several Eastern European locations for the remainder of the series until filming concluded in June.

== Release ==
=== Broadcast and ratings ===
In the United States the season premiered at the 10 p.m. time slot on Friday, 9 August 2013 on Cinemax. It premiered with 493,000 viewers on its first broadcast, with 195,000 of those viewers aged from 18 to 49 years, signifying a 0.2 rating in that demographic. Ratings were a rise of over 100,000 from the premiere of Vengeance. In the United Kingdom, Shadow Warfare will premiere at 9 p.m. on Monday, 28 October 2013.

== Critical reactions ==
The American review site Metacritic rated the series a 78 out of 100, indicating "generally favorable" reviews from five critical reviews.
