= Benjamin Whitrow =

British actor (1937–2017)

- Whitrow in 1991
- Born: Benjamin John Whitrow; 17 February 1937; Oxford, Oxfordshire, England
- Died: 28 September 2017 (aged 80); Wimbledon, London, England
- Education: Dragon School; Tonbridge School; Royal Academy of Dramatic Art
- Occupation: Actor
- Years active: 1964–2017
- Spouse: Catherine Cook (m. 1972)
- Partner: Celia Imrie
- Children: 3, including Angus Imrie

Benjamin John Whitrow (17 February 1937 – 28 September 2017) was a British actor. He was nominated for the BAFTA TV Award for Best Actor for his role as Mr Bennet in the 1995 BBC version of Pride and Prejudice, and voiced the role of Fowler in the 2000 animated film Chicken Run. His other film appearances included Quadrophenia (1979), Personal Services (1987) and Bomber (2009).

== Early life and education ==
Whitrow was born on 17 February 1937 in Oxford, Oxfordshire, the son of Mary Alexandra (Flaunders) and Philip Whitrow, a teacher at St Edward's School, Oxford.

Whitrow attended two independent schools: The Dragon School in Oxford and Tonbridge School, in the town of Tonbridge in Kent, followed by the Royal Academy of Dramatic Art.

== Life and career ==
Whitrow made his professional debut in Peter Ludwig Brent's Chance of Heaven at the Irving Theatre in 1955. He then served in the King's Dragoon Guards during his national service from 1956 to 1958, and was partly stationed in Malaya.

In 1959, after leaving the army, he resumed his acting career playing Hector Hushabye in George Bernard Shaw’s Heartbreak House at the Empire, Belfast. He then spent an eight-year apprenticeship in rep before joining the National Theatre company at The Old Vic under Laurence Olivier, who praised him saying "Benjamin Whitrow has never given a bad performance”.

He performed with the Royal Shakespeare Company on multiple occasions. In 1981 he appeared in Passion Play by Peter Nichols. In 1991 he played Falstaff in The Merry Wives of Windsor. He returned again in 2000, to play Sir Anthony Absolute in Richard Brinsley Sheridan’s The Rivals, and, the following year, Justice Shallow in Henry IV, Part II, a role in which, according to theatre critic Michael Coveney, he was "unforgettably hilarious".

In 1980 he played J.R. Ackerley, writer and literary editor of The Listener, in a dramatised biography We Think The World Of You, titled after Ackerley's 1960 novel of the same name, for the BBC's flagship arts programme Omnibus. That year's series won Best Programme/Series Without Category at the 1981 British Academy Television Awards.

In 1982 he appeared as the businessman in the film version of Brimstone and Treacle by Dennis Potter, directed by Richard Loncraine, which was nominated for the Gold Hugo for Best Feature at that year's Chicago International Film Festival, the Golden Charybdis at the Taormina International Film Festival, and which won the Grand Prix des Amériques at the Montreal World Film Festival.

Also in 1982, he played the Headmaster in A Shocking Accident, based on the short story of the same name by Graham Greene, which was nominated for a Gold Hugo for Best Short Film at the 1982 Chicago International Film Festival, for Best Short Film at the 36th British Academy Film Awards, and won the Oscar for Best Live Action Short at the 55th Academy Awards in 1983.

A lifelong fan of the writings of the English author Denton Welch, he was instrumental in bringing the third, revised version of Welch's journals to print in 1984, having made the acquaintance of one of Welch's friends who had possessed the manuscript of the original editor's edition. Whitrow appeared in the hard-hitting police drama,The Sweeney, in which he played Det. Chief Supt. Braithwaite.

He played Russell Bryant in the original radio version of After Henry by Simon Brett, which ran for four series between 1985 and 1989.

He starred in the ITV sitcom Ffizz alongside Richard Griffiths, about the joint-owners of a wine-business, which ran for two series between September 1987 and 29 August 1989.

In 1989, Whitrow appeared in episode four of the BBC Two sketch show A Bit of Fry and Laurie (series one), playing an irate member of the audience who claimed that Stephen Fry and Hugh Laurie had stolen several of their sketches from him.

Between 1990 and 1992, Whitrow appeared in the sitcom The New Statesman as Paddy O'Rourke, a Labour shadow minister who feigned an Irish accent when in public to attract the working-class vote.

Whitrow was nominated for the BAFTA TV Award for Best Actor for his portrayal of Mr Bennet in the 1995 adaptation of Pride and Prejudice.

In 2000 Whitrow performed as Maynard Keynes in 'Wooing in Absence', adapted by Patrick Garland from the letters of Maynard Keynes and Lydia Lopokova played by Natalia Makarova at Charleston Farmhouse then at Tate Britain.

Also in 2000 in the animated movie Chicken Run Whitrow voiced the character of Fowler, an old rooster who claims to have fought in World War II.

In 2009 Whitrow starred in the comedy-drama Bomber, about an 83-year-old man returning to Germany with his wife and son for a long-planned journey of atonement, which won the Best Feature award at five different independent film festivals.

His final film role was in 2017, as Sir Samuel Hoare in Darkest Hour, directed by Joe Wright, which was nominated for an Oscar for Best Picture at the 90th Academy Awards, and for Best Film at the 71st British Academy Film Awards.

Whitrow's last work was two plays for BBC Radio 4, in which he played the late Poet Laureate Sir John Betjeman. Mr Betjeman's Class was his last completed work; he died during the recording of Mr Betjeman Regrets, with the voice work being completed by Robert Bathurst. Both plays were broadcast on BBC Radio 4 over Christmas 2017.

=== Personal life ===
Whitrow was married to Catherine Cook, with whom he had two children. He also had a son, Angus Imrie, with actress Celia Imrie. He has five grandchildren, 2 of them being Max Whitrow and Milo Whitrow, the sons of Tom Whitrow, the producer of This is MY House and Four in a Bed.

Whitrow died from a brain haemorrhage in Wimbledon, London on 28 September 2017, aged 80.

== Select filmography ==
=== Film ===
- 1963: The Small World of Sammy Lee as Joan's Client (uncredited)
- 1963: West 11 as Minor Role (uncredited)
- 1979: Quadrophenia as Mr. Fulford, Jimmy's Boss
- 1982: Brimstone and Treacle as Businessman
- 1982: A Shocking Accident as Headmaster
- 1986: Clockwise as Headmaster #1
- 1987: Personal Services as Mr. Marsden
- 1988: Hawks as Mr. Granger
- 1988: On the Black Hill as Arkwright
- 1988: A Man for All Seasons as Thomas Cromwell
- 1992: Damage as Civil Servant
- 1992: Chaplin as Station Master
- 1995: Restoration as Merivel's Father
- 1997: The Opium War as Lord Palmerston
- 1997: The Saint as chairman at Oxford
- 1997: FairyTale: A True Story as Mr. Binley
- 1998: Jilting Joe as Arthur
- 2000: Chicken Run as Fowler (voice)
- 2006: Scenes of a Sexual Nature as Eddie Wright
- 2009: Bomber as Alistar
- 2017: Darkest Hour as Sir Samuel Hoare (final film role)

=== Television ===
- 1973: The Merchant of Venice (TV Movie) as the Duke of Venice (opposite Laurence Olivier as Shylock)
- 1973: The Brontes of Haworth as Arthur Bell Nicholls
- 1975–1981: Play for Today as James Sellars / Phillips / Tom / House Master / Josh
- 1978: The Sweeney as Det. Chief Supt. Braithwaite
- 1980: We Think The World Of You as J. R. Ackerley
- 1981: Bognor as Eric Gringe
- 1981: Troilus and Cressida (TV Movie) as Ulysses
- 1982: Tales of the Unexpected , Episode: What Have You Been Up To Lately?, as Fergus Locke
- 1982: Harry's Game as Davidson
- 1983: Shackleton as Captain Scott
- 1983: Agatha Christie's Partners in Crime as Sir Arthur Merivale
- 1984: Hay Fever (TV Movie) as Richard Greatham
- 1985: Dempsey & Makepeace (TV Movie) as Lindsay
- 1985: Bergerac as B J Farrell
- 1987–1989: Ffizz as Hugo Walker
- 1990: Chancer as Robert Douglas
- 1991: Rumpole of the Bailey as The Reverend Bill Britwell
- 1991–1992: The New Statesman as Paddy O'Rourke
- 1995: Pride and Prejudice as Mr Bennet
- 1996: Inspector Morse (The Daughters of Cain) as Brownlee
- 1997: The History of Tom Jones: A Foundling as Squire Allworthy
- 1999: Jonathan Creek as Rupert Clifford-Wright
- 2001: Monarch of the Glen as Toad
- 2001–2009: Midsomer Murders as Sir Malcolm Frazer / Hugo Balcombe
- 2005: The Queen's Sister (TV Movie) as Cronin
- 2006: Agatha Christie's Poirot (Episode: "After the Funeral") Timothy Abernethie
- 2014: New Tricks as Edward Fraser
- 2015: Toast of London as Ken Suggestion
- 2015: Man Down as Tim
- 2015: Wolf Hall as Archbishop Warham

=== Radio ===
- 1980: Unman, Wittering & Zigo as the headmaster; by Giles Cooper; BBC R4 7/8/1980.
- 1984: Dracula in White by Peter Redgrove; BBC R4 7/3/1984.
- 1984: Tragedy at Law as the Judge; by Cyril Hare; BBC Radio 4 Saturday Night Theatre 7/4/1984.
- 1985–1989: After Henry as Russell; BBC Radio 4 series by Simon Brett.
- 1992: A Warden for All Saints as James Montague, by H.S. Bhabra; BBC R4 29 April 1992.
- 1995: In The Red as the bank manager murderer; by Mark Tavener; BBC Radio 4 series 5/1/1995-16/2/1995.
- 1997: MR James Ghost story readings – The Late Book.
- 1999: Plum's War by Michael Butt, BBC R4 7/7/99.
- 2003: Brideshead Revisited by Evelyn Waugh, dramatised by Jeremy Front, BBC R4 8/3/2003.
- 2003: The Last Bark of the Bulldog by Jonathan Smith; Benjamin Whitrow portrays Winston Churchill; BBC R4 21 June 2003.
- 2011: Portrait of Winston, by Jonathan Smith; sequel to The Last Bark of the Bulldog; BBC R4 13 September 2011
- 2017: Mr Betjeman's Class and Mr Betjeman Regrets both by Jonathan Smith; BBC R4 25 December 2017 and 26 December 2017
