= Daniel Percival (director) =

British director and screenwriter

Daniel Percival is a British BAFTA-winning director and screenwriter of television drama.

== Career ==
Having originally trained as a film editor Percival started directing documentaries for the BBC in the mid 1990s. One of his earliest successes was a two-part series about depression for Channel 4 in England, New Britain on the Couch, presented by psychologist Oliver James, as well as Ancient Inventions.

Percival concentrated on drama work after 2000. He wrote for Waking the Dead, and co-wrote and directed the political thriller The State Within. The series, a joint production of BBC Films and BBC America, follows Sir Mark Brydon (Jason Isaacs), the British Ambassador to Washington, who is caught in the centre of a political conspiracy threatening to depose Western governments. As such, he must prevent a war, all whilst facing his own personal dilemmas. The series was nominated for two Golden Globe Awards in the categories 'Best Mini-Series or Motion Picture Made for Television' and 'Best Actor - Miniseries or Television Film'. Other work includes Death Comes to Pemberley and Jimmy McGovern's Banished, and several Frank Spotnitz productions, such as Chris Ryan's Strike Back, Crossing Lines, Hunted and Leonardo.
