= Tony Saint =

English novelist, playwright and screenwriter

- Born: 1968
- Occupation: Screenwriter

Antony David Saint (born 1968, west Northumberland, England) is an English novelist, playwright and screenwriter.

== Early life ==
He had contact with the theatre through the People's Theatre in Heaton. Whilst at university he was guitarist in a rock band The Little Caesars. In 1993, he joined the UK Immigration Service where he worked for ten years. He later wrote a book, Refusal Shoes, based on this experience.

== Career ==
His credits include 2009's Micro Men (about the men and development stories behind the BBC and Sinclair home computers), the 2008 The Long Walk to Finchley (on the early career of Margaret Thatcher), and one episode of The Whistleblowers in 2007 for ITV. He also wrote the 2006 TV play Service. In 2012 he wrote the crime drama The Interceptor, which was broadcast on BBC One.

He co-created and wrote on the Das Boot television series, which acts as a sequel to the original 1981 film. Saint also worked on the third series of the French crime drama Lupin, and on the third series of Tehran.

== Personal life ==
He was married in April 1998 in Northumberland.

== Publications ==
- Refusal Shoes ISBN 1-85242-773-6, July 2003 (all published by Serpent's Tail)
- Blag ISBN 1-85242-844-9, 2004
- The ASBO Show ISBN 1-85242-920-8, 2007
