= Strike Back =

Strike Back may refer to:

- Strike Back (album), a 1986 album by the German band Steeler
- Strike Back, a 2007 novel by author Chris Ryan
- Strike Back (TV series), a TV series based on the Ryan novel
  - Chris Ryan's Strike Back, the first series, aired in 2010
  - Strike Back: Project Dawn, the second series, aired in 2011
  - Strike Back: Vengeance, the third series, aired in 2012
  - Strike Back: Shadow Warfare, the fourth series, aired in 2013
  - Strike Back: Legacy, the fifth series, aired in 2015
  - Strike Back: Retribution, the sixth series, aired in 2017
  - Strike Back: Revolution, the seventh series, aired in 2019
  - Strike Back: Vendetta, the eighth and final series, aired in 2020
