= Christian Antidormi =

Australian actor (born 1992)

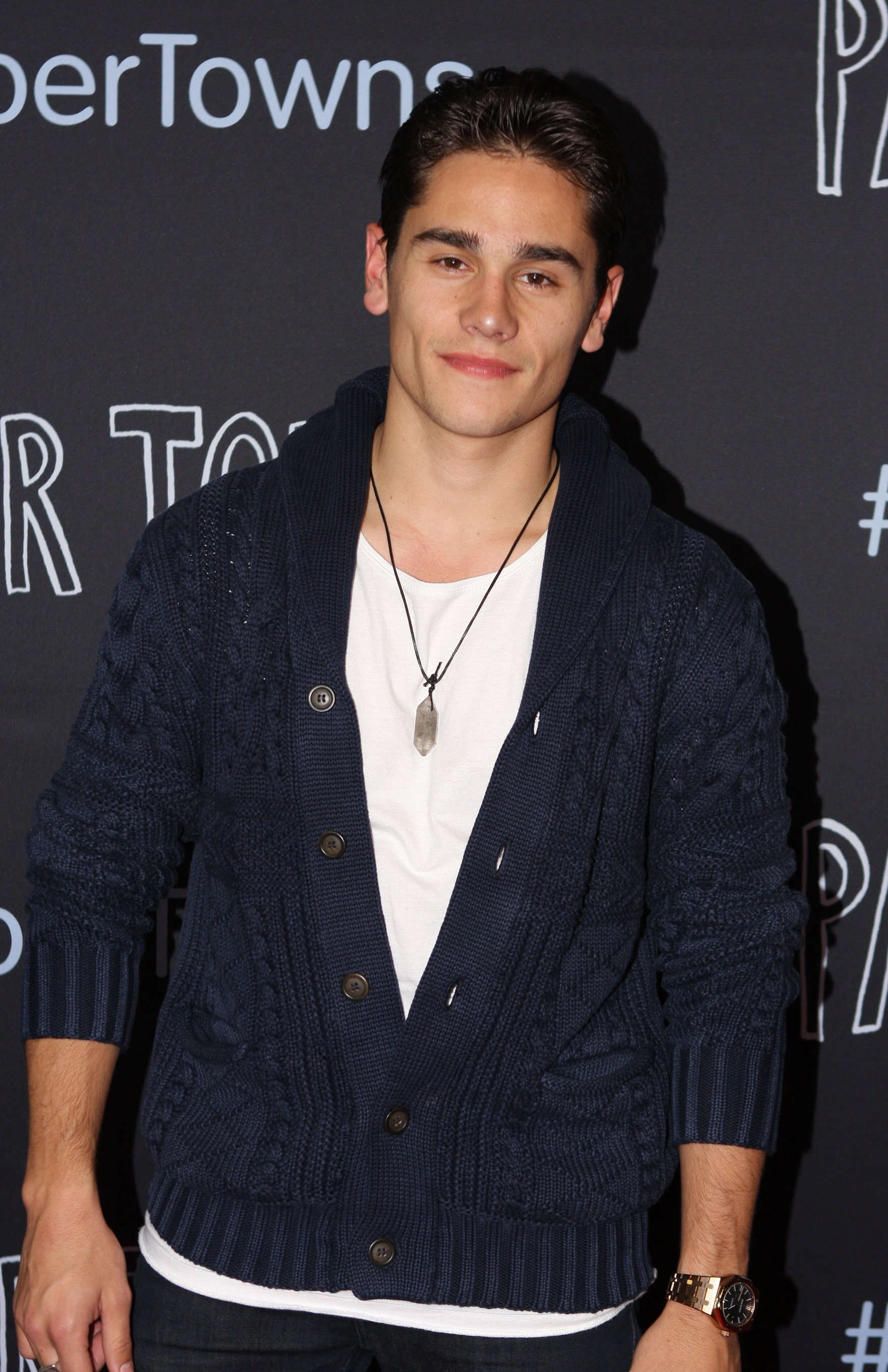
- Antidormi at the premiere of Paper Towns
- Born: 20 May 1992 (age 34); Sydney, Australia
- Occupation: Actor
- Years active: 2008–present

Christian Antidormi (born 20 May 1992) is an Australian actor. He is known for his roles in several television productions, including As The Bell Rings, Home and Away, and the US television series, Spartacus: War of the Damned.

== Early life ==
Antidormi was born and raised in Sydney's southern suburbs. He played football (soccer) for 14 years and actively participated in karate, swimming, and tennis. Antidormi discovered his love of dramatic arts and hip hop dancing at the age of 15. His interest and talent in hip hop lead him to numerous stage and music video productions and competitions, including Cassie Davis I Like it Loud music video, and the National Hip Hop solo title at the prestigious Peter Oxford-Showcase Australian Dance Championships.

Antidormi's passion for the arts led him to take on singing, as well as become a part-time Hip-Hop teacher at his former dance school All Starz Performing Arts Studio in Sydney. Antidormi took the path of film and television, and participated in numerous acting courses at some of Australia's leading acting schools The Australian Film and Television Academy (TAFTA) and the Australian Theatre for Young People.

== Career ==
Antidormi made his acting début in 2008 in the AFI award-winning Australia television mini-series, False Witness, produced by Screentime Australia' for the Australian subscription television channel UK.TV, which aired in several countries around the world.

In 2009, Antidormi landed his breakout television role starring in Disney Channel's locally produced short-form comedy series As The Bell Rings. Antidormi starred in series 3 and 4 that aired on Foxtel/Austar in 2010/2011.

He appeared in two short films, I Spy and Pride and was cast as a recurring guest in the Seven Networks soap opera television series Home and Away as Jaden Post. Antidormi also appeared in the Seven Network drama television series Packed to the Rafters in 2012.

In July 2012, Antidormi played the role of Tiberius, the son of Marcus Crassus in the third and final season of the American historical action television series Spartacus: War of the Damned.

He was photographed for a coffee table book titled In The Tub (photographed and directed by TJ Scott, Spartacus Director). All proceeds from the coffee table book go to the Breast Cancer Foundation - Release 2013.

== Filmography ==
Year	Title	Role	Notes
2008	False Witness	Street kid	TV mini-series
2009–2011	As the Bell Rings S3	Vince	Main role Seasons 3+4; 16 episodes
2010	StepXStep	Lead	TV series, Pilot
2011	I Spy	Chris	Leading Role, Short film
2012	Pride	Leo	Leading Role, Short film
2012	Home and Away	Jayden Post	Guest role, 5 episodes
2012	Spartacus: War of the Damned	Tiberius Licinius Crassus	Main role, 9 episodes
2015	Strike Back: Legacy	Finn	Guest role, 5 episodes
2020	Roswell, New Mexico	Forrest Long	Recurring role
2024	The Lincoln Lawyer	Sly Funaro Jr.	Guest role, 3 episodes
2025	Mafia: The Old Country	Cesare Massaro	Video game
2025	Honey Don't!	Colligan	
