= Brian Fortune =

Irish actor

Brian Fortune is an Irish actor.

== Career ==
He is best known for his role as Othell Yarwyck in the HBO series Game of Thrones.

He has appeared in numerous Irish television and film projects, including Wrath of the Crows (2013) and A Nightingale Falling (2014). He also starred in Christian Blake (2008), The Inside (2012) and Cold (2013), by director Eoin Macken. He played the main character in the independent Irish film The Last Show (2015), directed by Rita Marie Lawlor.

== Filmography ==
=== Film ===
| Year | Title | Role |
|---|---|---|
| 2005 | Hill 16 | Mr. Brady |
| 2008 | Christian Blake | Dr. Rush |
| 2010 | Shackled | Jim McDonald |
| 2012 | The Inside | Eamo |
| 2013 | Wrath of the Crows | Hugo |
| 2013 | An Irish Exorcism | Father Byrne |
| 2013 | Cold | John Maguire |
| 2013 | How to Be Happy | Larry |
| 2014 | A Nightingale Falling | Tom Nolan |
| 2015 | The Last Show | The Director |
| 2015 | Spider's Trap | Mr. Carter |
| 2016 | Model Hunger | Colin |
| 2016 | The Secret Scripture | Psychiatrist analyst |
| 2017 | Soulsmith | Terry |
| 2019 | The Professor and the Madman | Head Board Member |

=== Television ===
| Year | Title | Role | Notes |
|---|---|---|---|
| 2011–2016 | Game of Thrones | Othell Yarwyck | 14 episodes |
| 2012 | Cuckoo | Brendan | |
| 2015 | Vikings | Injured Noble | 1 episode ("Paris") |
