= Tereza Srbova =

Czech actress and model

Tereza Srbová
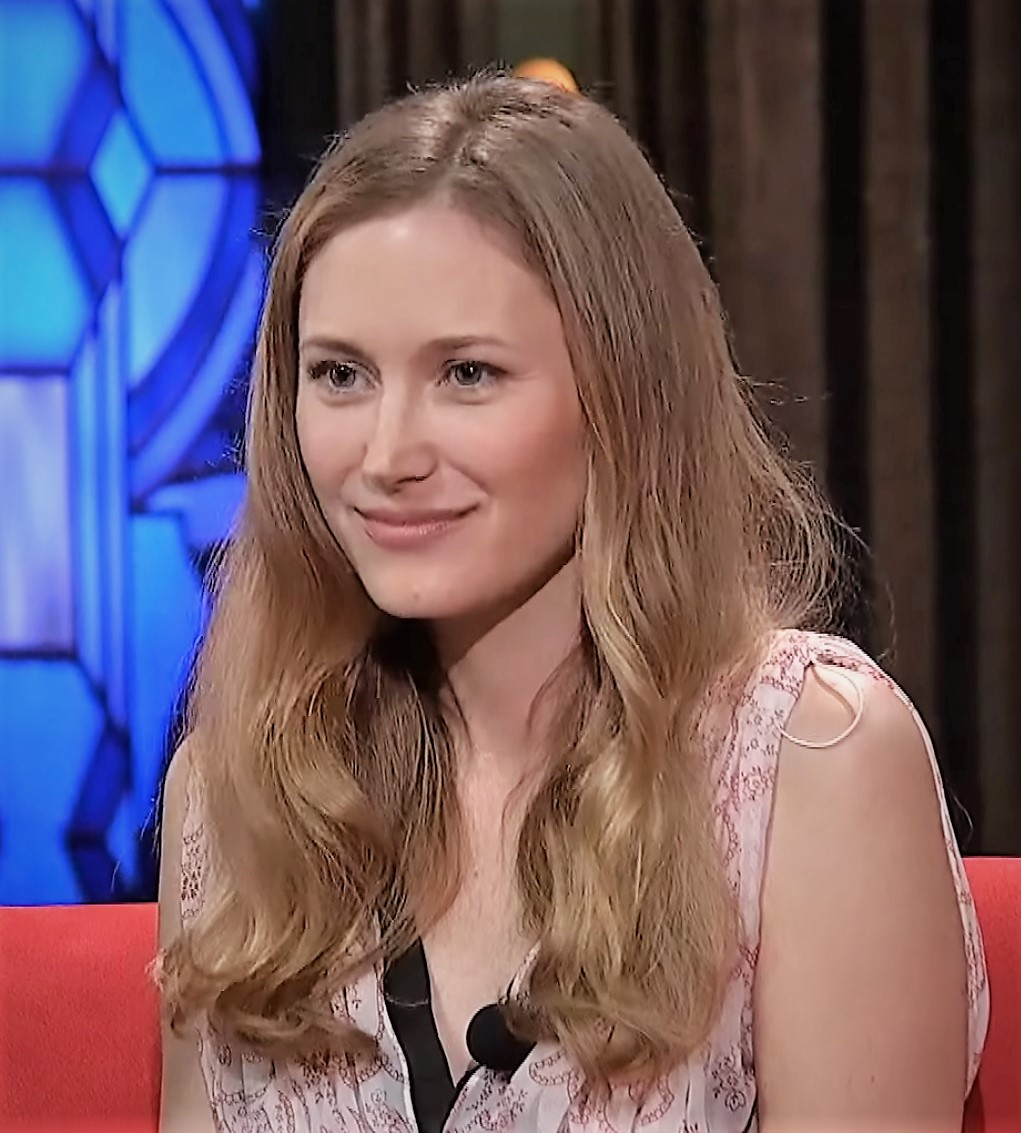
- Srbova on Show Jana Krause in 2019
- Born: 23 June 1984 (age 41); Prague, Czechoslovakia
- Occupations: Actress, model, writer

Tereza Srbová (born June 23, 1984) is a Czech actress, writer and model best known for her roles in David Cronenberg's Eastern Promises, Trevor Nunn's Red Joan, HBO/Cinemax series Strike Back and Tom Clancy's Jack Ryan.

== Early life and education ==
When Srbova was a child she sang in the Czech children's choir Bambini di Praga.

She earned a master's degree in culture anthropology from the Faculty of Arts, Charles University.

== Modelling ==
While undertaking her studies, she was approached by Elite Model Management Paris and appeared in many high-end campaigns such as Christian Dior, Mauboussin, Clarins, Crombie and Martini. She spent a year as an in-house model for designer Azzedine Alaïa.

She has been photographed for many magazines such as L'Officiel, Elle, Harper's Bazaar, Cosmopolitan, Vogue, The Face, Surface, FHM and Madame Figaro.

From 2001 to 2006 she appeared in numerous print and television commercials, including Panasonic, Evian, Wrigley, T-Mobile, Jaguar Cars, Absolut Vodka, Oriflame, Keri Lotion and Beck's Brewery.

== Acting ==
In 2007 she transitioned to acting when her first audition won her the role of Ukrainian prostitute Kirilenko in David Cronenberg's 2007 film Eastern Promises. That same year, she appeared in the films St. Trinian's and Eichmann, followed in 2008 with a role in Inkheart.

In 2010 Srbova played her first lead role, as Silka in the Lionsgate horror Siren. In this film, Srbova performed the song "Elephants" by Warpaint.

In 2013, Srbova played the recurring role of agent Major Nina Pirogova in the Cinemax television series Strike Back: Shadow Warfare, reprising her role in the 2015 series Strike Back: Legacy.

In 2019 Srbova co-starred in the spy drama Red Joan opposite Judi Dench and Sophie Cookson. The film premiered at Toronto International Film Festival in 2018.

In 2022 Srbova appears as Jana Breza in four episodes of the third season of Tom Clancy's Jack Ryan.

== Writing and Directing ==
In 2017 Srbova wrote and directed her short film debut, Meanders. It received a short film award at the Ischia Global Film & Music Festival (Italy), a special jury mention at Fano Film Festival (Italy), screened as part of the official selection at Sose International Film Festival (Armenia), and received the Award of Excellence at Canada Shorts.

Her first book, a graphic novel titled Sidonie, came out in October 2021 at Labyrint Publishing Prague. Its story is based on the biography of Sidonie Nádherná. The novel was nominated for the Golden Ribbon award (Zlatá stuha).

== Filmography ==
=== Film ===
- Eastern Promises (2007)
- St Trinian's (2007)
- Eichmann (2007)
- Inkheart (2008)
- Siren (2010)
- 360 (2011)
- The Inside (2012)
- Red Joan (2018)

=== Television ===
- Strike Back: Shadow Warfare (2013) - 3 episodes
- Strike Back: Legacy (2015) - 3 episodes
- Houdini & Doyle (2016) - 1 episode
- Tom Clancy's Jack Ryan (2022) - 4 episodes
