= Stalking the Bogeyman =

American play by Markus Potter and David Holthouse

- Original Off-Broadway poster
- Original language: English
- Written by: Markus Potter & David Holthouse
- Based on: This American Life's Stalking the bogeyman

Premiere
- Place: North Carolina Stage Company; Asheville, North Carolina Off-Broadway London
- Official website

Stalking the Bogeyman is an American play by Markus Potter and David Holthouse with additional writing by Shane Zeigler, Shane Stokes & Santino Fontana. It is based upon David Holthouse's Westword newspaper article, where Holthouse wrote about how he had once planned to kill his childhood rapist. Potter chose to adapt the play after listening to Holthouse's story on a This American Life podcast, and the play had its world premiere at the North Carolina Stage Company in September 2013. An off-Broadway production ran from September 29, 2014 until November 9, 2014 at New World Stages. A new production of the play opened in London on July 11, 2016. The play made its Australian premiere at the historic Old Fitzroy Theatre in Sydney on May 23, 2018. The play received an Outer Critics Circle Award nomination off-Broadway, and three Offies, including best production.

== Synopsis ==
When he was seven, David Holthouse was raped by a 17-year-old acquaintance whom he knew through friends of his parents. The teenager threatened to kill him if he did not comply with his wishes, and after he was finished, David was threatened with violence if he did not keep quiet. Twenty-five years later, David can no longer remain silent when he learns that the man who destroyed his childhood has moved into his new neighborhood. With key ties to the leader of an Arizona gang and other illicit connections, David meticulously plans the murder of the Bogeyman. Feature story: STALKING THE BOGEYMAN: VENGEANCE OR HEALING?

== Productions ==
Production	Producer(s)	Run
World Premiere	North Carolina Stage	September 18 - October 13, 2013
Off-Broadway	NewYorkRep	September 29, 2014 - November 9, 2014
West Coast Premiere	University of Alaska Anchorage	April 1–24, 2016
Off-West End London	David Adkin & NewYorkRep	July 13 - August 6, 2016
Australian Premiere	Neil Gooding & NewYorkRep	May 23 - June 23, 2018

Off-Broadway
The Off-Broadway production was Directed by Markus Potter. The production included scenic design by David Goldstein, Costume Design by Tristan Raines, Lighting Design by Cory Pattak, and Original Music and Sound Design by Erik T. Lawson. The cast included Murphy Guyer, Roxanne Hart, Erik Heger, John Herrera, Roderick Hill, and Kate Levy.

Off-West End of London

Stalking The Bogeyman opened at Southwark Playhouse Theatre, London on 13 July, running to 6 August 2016. The production, again directed by Markus Potter, features Gerard McCarty and Glynis Barber. Set & costume design is by Rachel Stone, lighting design by Rob Casey, original music by Erik T. Lawson, sound design by David Gregory and Casting by Anne Vosser. It is produced by David Adkin and NewYorkRep in association with Joel Fisher, Adam Richman and The Telling Company.

== Cast ==
Character	Off-Broadway	Off-West End
David Holthouse	RODERICK HILL	GERARD MCCARTHY
Bogeyman	ERIK HEGER	MIKE EVANS
Nancy Holthouse	KATE LEVY	GLYNIS BARBER
Robert Holthouse, Emmit Jacobson	MURPHY GUYER	GEOFFREY TOWERS
Russ Crawford, Payaso, Coach Billy	JOHN HERRERA	JOHN MORIATIS
Carol Crawford, Dr. Leavitt*	ROXANNE HART	AMY VAN NOSTRAND

*In the Off-West End Production, the character of Dr Leavitt was replaced with the character of Molly.

== Reviews and critical response ==
OFF-BROADWAY

“BREATHTAKING! Based on the riveting true story adapted from This American Life, the production’s trip to the stage has only deepened it.”
- The New York Times

“DON’T MISS Stalking the Bogeyman. A dynamic play of sobering substance. Well-written and sensitively acted. Potent stuff that never soft soaps the issues and leaves you stunned. HIGHLY RECOMMENDED."
- Rex Reed, New York Observer

“One of the most powerful and gripping pieces of theatre you will find anywhere in New York. RUN & SEE IT! Given the subject matter and thought-‐provoking performances, STALKING THE BOGEYMAN is going to engage you well beyond the final blackout. This isn’t an easy play to forget.”
‐ BroadwayBox.com

“Potter’s stark, unforgiving staging and matter-‐of-‐fact design.”
‐ Talkin’ Broadway

“The successful dramatization owes as much to Markus Potter’s effective narrative structure as to its thoughtful staging, design and excellent ensemble.”
‐ The Broadway Blog

“Careful and cogent direction by Markus Potter.”
‐ Huffington Post

“Markus Potter has created a production that is impeccable in its stagecraft.”
‐ New York Theater

“A shattering true story – and as adapted and directed by Markus Potter the effect is viscerally powerful.”
‐ Northern Valley Suburbanite / NJ.com

“Consistently precise blocking, effective narrative structure, and thoughtful staging from Markus Potter.”
‐ The Broadway Blog

“This is a fascinating study of human understanding, compassion, and grace. Issues of sexual molestation and abuse have long been topics for movies of the week and television crime dramas, but watching this story unfold on stage brings a visceral permanence to an awkward and uncomfortable topic. Kudos to adaptor and director Markus Potter for handling such a delicate matter with dramatic strength and truth."
‐ Manhattan Digest

“Good theater boils down to one thing: a great story, told well. STALKING THE BOGEYMAN adapted and directed by Markus Potter is a gripping tale based on the true story of David Holthouse.”
‐ Broadway.com

“A successful dramatization with effective narrative, thoughtful staging, and excellent ensemble.”
‐ The Broadway Blog

“Brave storytelling of a delicate subject – something you don’t see often in the theatrical world. Each second of this new play directed by Markus Potter is an exciting revelation.”
‐ NY Theater Now

“A fast-‐paced powerful new play directed by Markus Potter that keeps you on the edge of your seat. Definitely a play I will think above for a long time.”
‐ David Lally, NY Theater Now

“Nakedly honest. Stalking the Bogeyman stands on its own engaging integrity even before you add in that it’s based on a true story. It’s something for everyone to explore – and they will proceed to process it in their minds for a long time.”
‐ Metro

“Could not be better! A highly important play that demands to be seen.”
‐ Northern Valley Suburbanite / NJ.com

“Important theater does more than entertain, and some stories, like this one left me breathless. ..Intimate, Deeply Compelling, & Powerful.”
‐ Flavorpill

LONDON REVIEWS

What's On Stage ★★★★ "Authentic and searing new drama. Skilfully woven together and expertly played."

The Reviews Hub ★★★★ "A taughtly told story of catharsis and revenge." "Unnerving energy with great performances" "Presented excellently with great depth".

London Theatre ★★★★ "Markus Potter and David Holthouse's gripping and harrowing drama Stalking The Bogeyman does just this. Necessary and thought-provoking drama.Markus Potter's careful delivery and spirited direction absorbs the audience and has each of the characters emerge from the auditorium to join the space in the frankest way possible. On a multi-functional playing space, he moves location effortlessly, balancing the realism within the text against an immersive expressionistic set that merges David's childhood bedroom and memories with his efforts to 'stalk' the bogeyman in order to find some solace."

BBC Radio ★★★★ "EXTRAORDINARY. The best piece of theatre I've seen in years. Beautifully constructed, highly recommended."

Sunday Times ★★★★ “Brave and unflinching, Intense and tightly executed. A challenging and thought-provoking piece of theatre that needs to be told."

The upcoming ★★★★ "It keeps the audience on the edge of their seats. It is a play that needs to be seen, a story that needs to be heard."

Evening Standard ★★★★ "An Eloquent production. Potter’s unflinching vision makes for deliberately uncomfortable viewing."

Jonathan Baz Reviews ★★★★ Stalking The Bogeyman - Review "Stalking The Bogeyman is a brave and challenging play. Well-crafted writing and performance, cleverly staged."

Plays to See ★★★★ "A well-written and cleverly paced play…Powerful and precise. Thought provoking and witty piece with superb production values. A redemptive story."

British Theatre Guide ★★★★ "Well constructed and very moving." "Gripping staging" "Stunning performances"

Boyz Magazine ★★★★ "Powerful riveting drama with twists and turns that the audience never sees coming, mainly because they are so staggeringly truthful. One of the most important plays you’re likely to see this year"

London News Online ★★★★ "A play that demands to be seen. Grippingly intense. Astonishing performances…Ultimately this is an incredibly important play – brutal and honest but with a message of hope."

West End Wilma: ★★★★ "This is an intense and heartbreaking production, sensitively directed by Markus Potter, and performed by an outstanding cast."

Survivors Manchester: ★★★★ "The most beautifully inspiring experience In the theatre I have ever had." "Markus Potter and David Holthouse have produced something that is more than a script, more than a play. They have produced an access point for the world to understand the true reality of being a male survivor, and intricacies and complexities of living with the biggest secret one can ever have".

AUSTRALIA

"This is theatre on a knife edge, with infinite micro-decisions by the writers contributing to its urgency as it lifts a scab and allows us to peer at a wound most of us could barely imagine." - Sydney Morning Herald

"Graeme McRae delivers an outstanding performance. It is an incredibly important story that needs to be heard." - BroadwayWorld

"When theatre bites down hard on a subject like this you, too, are caught in its teeth." - The Sydney Morning Herald

“...this is gut punch theatre by stealth...Stalking The Bogeyman is an important, relevant story to tell. Unfortunately, not a rare story....But the truth telling mustn’t stop and at this time, in this intimate space, with this cast, this production bears witness with humanity and authority. – Sydney Arts Guide

A very involving piece of theatre that leaves you thinking and feeling a little raw from the sexual trauma that so many in our society experience. Played with heartfelt naturalism and honesty by Graeme McRae, this is the true story of David Holthouse. Stalking the Bogeyman is told in such a way that you are responding moment by moment to the life of David in his reliving of the experience and him trying to come to terms with his abuse. We the audience feel his horror, his fear, his wanting it to all go away, his awareness of other bogeymen in society, his desire for revenge, his desire to self-destruct, and his secrecy of the rape to the people closest in his life in order to protect them. – The Buzz from Sydney

Holthouse, alongside playwright Markus Potter, has created a complex, compelling piece of storytelling that could so easily have been one-dimensional and all about revenge. But there are so many other important layers to the script. They have managed to articulate all of the conflicting emotions of betrayal, pain, revenge and fear in a distinctly human way. – Theatre Now

It is an engaging production, keeping things concise and clear. Ideas in Stalking The Bogeyman are simple, and powerfully conveyed on this stage. Leading man Graeme McRae’s vulnerability as David is a vital component, that preserves our empathy comprehensively, through every step of the proceedings. The eponymous bogeyman is played by Radek Jonak, whose portrayal of malevolence is as impressive as the electrifying energy he introduces with each appearance. – Suzy Go See

Stalking the Bogeyman is a gripping story that is both stomach-turning and shocking as it is hard to fathom that this not just a playwright's imagination but is a real story. The work retains the truth and honesty without overacting so that the impact of the work is fully felt, and the weight of the content is clear. It is an incredibly important story that needs to be heard so that people protect the innocent.. – Broadway World

What you get in Stalking the Bogeyman is the raw emotion imparted from the victim... It’s a very moving, very personal and powerful account and Graeme McRae as a wounded but empathetic David holds our attention from that opening line to the very last line. The ensemble cast are uniformly excellent and the whole production, is tight and compelling. This is a difficult story and a confronting production with a subtle approach to trauma and masculinity that I haven’t seen on a Sydney stage before. – Night Writes

NORTH CAROLINA

Critical reception for the North Carolina performance was positive and the Citizen-Times praised the play's cast.
