= Andy Kellegher =

Irish actor

Andy Kellegher is an Irish actor.

== Career ==
He is best known for his role as Polliver in HBO's Game of Thrones and for his portrayal of Brendan "Beady" Burke in the Irish TV series Red Rock as a main cast member.

He has appeared in numerous Irish television and film projects, including Parked (2010), A Nightingale Falling (2014) and The Hit Producer (2014).

== Filmography ==
=== Film ===
Year	Title	Role	Notes
2010	Parked	Robbo	
2014	A Nightingale Falling	Black & Tan	
2015	The Hit Producer	Anto McNamee	
2015	Pursuit	Wayne	
2016	The Secret Scripture	Protestant church cleric	
2017	Maze	Warder Williams	
2024	The Clean Up Crew	Jack	
2024	Banhoeffer	Gestapo at the Buchenwalde	

=== Television ===
Year	Title	Role	Notes
2008	Single-Handed	Martin Riordan	2 episodes
2009	Inspector George Gently	Keith	1 episode ("Gently in the Blood")
2010	Síol	Dave	1 episode ("Éabha")
2010	The Tudors	English soldier	1 episode ("As It Should Be")
2012–2014	Game of Thrones	Polliver	3 episodes
2013	Ripper Street	Prison guard	1 episode ("In My Protection")
2013	Vikings	Saxon warrior	1 episode ("A King's Ransom")
2014	Quirke	Costigan's man	1 episode ("Christine Falls")
2015–2016	Red Rock	Brendan "Beady" Burke	22 episodes
2017	Line of Duty	Prison officer	1 episode
2025	Sherlock & Daughter	Weams	2 episodes

== Theatre ==
- The Well of the Saints, directed by Garry Hynes
- The Playboy of the Western World, directed by Garry Hynes
- The Lieutenant of Inishmore, directed by Andrew Flynn
- Country Music, directed by Andrew Flynn
- The Good Thief, directed by Andrew Flynn
- Translations, directed by Andrew Flynn (Town Hall Theatre)
- Juno and the Paycock, directed by Andrew Flynn (Cork Opera House)
- Here We Are Again Still, directed by Andrew Flynn
- Green Street, directed by Paul Meade (2012)
- The Circus of Perseverance, directed by Philip Doherty (2013)
- Retreat, directed by Bairbre Ni Chaoimh (The New Theatre, Dublin, 2014)
- Shibboleth, directed by Stacey Gregg (Peacock Theatre, 2015)
- Observe the Sons of Ulster Marching Towards the Somme, directed by Jeremy Herrin (2016)
