= Gerard McCarthy =

Northern Irish actor (born 1981)

- Born: Gerard McCarthy; 31 March 1981 (age 45); Belfast, Northern Ireland
- Occupation: Actor
- Years active: 2005–present
- Website: Official website

Gerard McCarthy (born 31 March 1981) is an actor from Belfast, Northern Ireland.

== Early life ==
McCarthy was born in Belfast and attended St. Mary's Christian Brothers' Grammar School.

== Career ==
Gerard Mccarthy was awarded Sir Kenneth Branagh's Renaissance Scholarship to train at Laine Theatre Arts, graduating in 2002.

They portrayed Kevin McSwain in BBC Two's BAFTA nominated drama The Fall, starring Gillian Anderson.

On Netflix, they can be seen alongside Derek Jacobi, Neve Campbell and Joely Richardson as Ashley Stokes in Titanic: Blood & Steel, an epic 12-part series charting the extraordinary construction of RMS Titanic in the shipyards of Edwardian Belfast. The series was nominated for five IFTA Awards, including Best Series.

They played Brondsted in the first episode of Michael Hirst's History Channel series Vikings, starring Gabriel Byrne.

McCarthy also played Rory Thompson in Samson Films' Belonging to Laura, a modern-day adaptation of Oscar Wilde's Lady Windermere's Fan directed by Karl Golden, which was nominated for Best Single Drama at the IFTA Awards.

McCarthy is known for their award-winning performance as Kris Fisher on the Channel 4 soap opera Hollyoaks from 2006 to 2010, for which they were nominated in the Best Newcomer category at The British Soap Awards and the National Television Awards.

On stage, McCarthy made their Shakespearean debut as Fenton in The Merry Wives of Windsor at Shakespeare's Globe in London. The production received widespread critical acclaim and subsequently transferred to New York and Los Angeles, with McCarthy reprising their role in both cities. 2012 also saw them return to the stage in a highly acclaimed production of Joe Penhall's Olivier Award-winning play Blue/Orange.

They subsequently filmed the BBC comedy Puppy Love, written by and starring Joanna Scanlan and Vicki Pepperdine (co-creators of the BAFTA nominated Getting On), and returned to the stage at the end of 2014 in the world premiere of Jonathan Harker and Dracula.

McCarthy's debut feature film, A Nightingale Falling, premiered at the 2014 Galway Film Fleadh.

In 2015, McCarthy returned to their homeland with the one-man show Cat - The Play by Richard Hardwick and Jamie Beamish, before commencing a national tour of Jonathan Harvey's Beautiful Thing, in which they played Tony. Shortly after this, they played George Bailey in the UK premiere of It's a Wonderful Life at Penge's Bridgehouse Theatre, directed by Guy Retallack.

2016 saw McCarthy return to Hollyoaks as a member of the core writing team; they then reprised their role of Kevin McSwain in season 3 of The Fall.

McCarthy played the leading role of David Hothouse in the UK premiere of Stalking the Bogeyman. The production received widespread critical and public acclaim; McCarthy was nominated for the Offie for Best Actor.

In 2017, McCarthy played Emmett Forrest in the Leicester Curve's production of Legally Blonde at the Opera Garnier in Monte Carlo.

In 2018, they joined the cast of the BBC drama Call the Midwife as Terry Davidson, before playing Erwin Bach in the original West End cast of Tina at the Aldwych Theatre, London.

In 2020, McCarthy filmed the role of Bobby Frank in Belfast, written and directed by Kenneth Branagh and starring Caitriona Balfe, Judi Dench, Jamie Dornan and Ciaran Hinds. In 2021, Just Johnny, a short film written by McCarthy, was filmed on location in Northern Ireland, directed by Terry Loane.

In 2025, McCarthy played the character of Jim Scott in the four-part Channel 4 drama Trespasses, alongside Lola Petticrew, Tom Cullen and Gillian Anderson. Adapted by Ailbhe Keogan from Louise Kennedy's novel and directed by Dawn Shadforth, the series is set in Northern Ireland during the Troubles.

In 2026, McCarthy withdrew from a Soho Theatre production of Stan Zimmerman's suicide-awareness play Right Before I Go at when Maureen Lipman joined the cast. McCarthy gave as the reason Lipman's views on Israel and Gaza. McCarthy had starred in the play's previous Edinburgh run. Lipman criticised the actor for being "so cowardly", suggesting that McCarthy had been radicalised, and described their withdrawal as "virtue-signalling".

In October 2026, it was announced that Exeter Northcott Theatre would stage the world premiere of Made In Liverpool, a new play by McCarthy about Stuart Sutcliffe and the formation of the Beatles. The play will open in June 2027 as part of the theatre's 60th anniversary.

== Charity work ==
McCarthy began their association with the Northern Ireland Children's Hospice in October 2007 when they overcame their fear of heights by leading a fundraising abseil event, in which they had to climb down Belfast's Europa Hotel. They then became a celebrity supporter of The White Sapphire Ball in aid of the NI Children's Hospice, which auctioned off a romantic dinner with McCarthy for £4,500. In December 2009, they took part in a celebrity version of Panic Attack and won £1000 for the NI Children's Hospice.

In January 2010, McCarthy led the Belfast4Haiti 5K run in their home city with Olympic gold medallist Mary Peters. The event was organised to raise funds for victims of the Haiti earthquake.

== Personal life ==
They came out as non-binary in 2022.
