= Alin Sumarwata =

Australian actress

- Born: Tehran, Iran
- Occupation: Actress
- Years active: 2004–present
- Spouse: Don Hany (2011–)
- Children: 2

Alin Sumarwata is an Iranian-born Australian actress, whose roles include May Stone in soap opera Home and Away, Sophia Angleton in East West 101 and Vanessa Villante in Neighbours, a role she played from 2012 to 2013, 2015 and 2019. She has also starred in Strike Back: Retribution, Strike Back: Revolution and Strike Back: Vendetta as Gracie Novin.

== Early life ==
Sumarwata was born in Tehran, Iran. She moved to Australia with her family at the age of seven. Sumarwata gained a scholarship to the Australian Theatre for Young People and later attended the Newtown High School of the Performing Arts. She worked part time in a law firm and an accounting firm, while she graduated from Macquarie University with a Bachelor of Commerce and a Bachelor of Laws.

== Career ==
One of Sumarwata's early acting jobs was a role on Indonesian television soap opera Kenapa Ada Cinta. In 2009, Sumarwata starred as Yasmin Van Koors in the mini-series, False Witness. She joined the cast of Home and Away in the recurring role of May Stone, before moving onto roles in Rescue Special Ops and East West 101.

Sumarwata stars as Isabella Fortino in short film, Dark Horse. For her portrayal of Isabella, Sumarwata won the "Best Female Actor in a Short Film" award at the Melbourne Underground Film Festival. The following year, Sumarwata appeared in Sea Patrol and Tangle.

On 5 December 2011, it was announced Sumarwata had joined the cast of Neighbours in the regular role of Vanessa Villante. Sumarwata and her family relocated from Sydney to Melbourne, so she could film her scenes. Sumarwata's character was written out in 2013. She made three guest appearances in 2015, and she reprised the role again in 2019.

In 2016, Sumarwata joined the cast of Strike Back as Gracie Novin for the show's sixth series, which began airing in 2017. She reprised the role for the seventh series Strike Back: Revolution, which aired in 2019. Sumarwata reprised the role for the final season, Strike Back: Vendetta which started airing on February 14, 2020.

== Personal life ==
Sumarwata is married to actor Don Hany. They have two daughters.

== Filmography ==
Year	Title	Role	Notes
2004	Soul Traces: The Introduction	Clara Woods	TV movie
2005	The Incredible Journey of Mary Bryant	Nani	2 episodes
2007	Death's Requiem	Sarah	Short film
2008	The Terrorist		Short film
2008	Octopus	Jane	Short film
2009	False Witness	Yasmin Van Koors	Also known as The Diplomat
2009	Home and Away	May Stone	Recurring role
2009	Rescue Special Ops	Brooke Henley	Episode: "Rescue in the Blue Mountains"
2009	East West 101	Sophia Angleton	Recurring role
2009	Dark Horse	Isabella Fortino	Short film
2010	Sea Patrol	Sylvanna Gorski	Episode: "In Too Deep"
2010	Tangle	Julie	Episode: "Sleepwalking"
2011	Burning Man	Nurse	Film
2012–2013, 2015, 2019	Neighbours	Vanessa Villante	Main cast
2015	Mary: The Making of a Princess	Princess Alexandra, Countess of Frederiksborg	TV movie
2016	Jack Irish	Galerry Owner	2 episodes
2017	Strike Back: Retribution	Lance Corporal Gracie Novin	Main cast
2019	Strike Back: Revolution	Lance Corporal Gracie Novin	Main cast
2019	My Life Is Murder	Morgana Finch	Episode: "Feet of Clay"
2020	Strike Back: Vendetta	Lance Corporal Gracie Novin	Main cast
