= Jason Bostic =

American football player (born 1976)

Profile
- Positions: Cornerback, safety

Personal information
- Born: June 30, 1976 (age 50); Fort Lauderdale, Florida
- Listed height: 5 ft 9 in (1.75 m)
- Listed weight: 190 lb (86 kg)

Career information
- High school: Cardinal Gibbons (Fort Lauderdale, Florida)
- College: Georgia Tech

Career history
- 1999–2000: Philadelphia Eagles
- 2002: Buffalo Bills
- Stats at Pro Football Reference

Jason Devon Bostic (born June 30, 1976) is an American former football defensive back in the National Football League for the Philadelphia Eagles and the Buffalo Bills. He played college football at Georgia Tech. He attended Cardinal Gibbons High School in Fort Lauderdale, where he primarily played as a running back.

== Biography ==
Following his career at Georgia Tech, Bostic went undrafted in the 1999 NFL draft. Bostic was signed by the Philadelphia Eagles to a contract but failed to make the team out of training camp. Signed to the Eagles practice squad, Bostic was promoted to the active roster late in the season due to several injuries to the starting defensive backs on the Eagles roster, and played in his first career game on January 3, 2000 against the St. Louis Rams, where he recorded three tackles in the 38-31 win.

After Allen Rossum was traded to the Green Bay Packers, Bostic made the active roster out of training camp in the 2000 season, ultimately playing in all sixteen regular season games.

== Personal life ==
Bostic is a cousin of former Philadelphia Eagles running back James Bostic.
