= Red Joan =

2018 British drama film

- UK Theatrical release poster
- Directed by: Trevor Nunn
- Written by: Lindsay Shapero
- Produced by: David Parfitt
- Starring: Stephen Campbell Moore; Sophie Cookson; Tom Hughes; Ben Miles; Nina Sosanya; Tereza Srbova; Judi Dench
- Cinematography: Zac Nicholson
- Edited by: Kristina Hetherington
- Music by: George Fenton
- Production companies: Trademark Films; Quickfire; Embankment Films; Twickenham Studios; Cambridge Picture Company
- Distributed by: Lionsgate
- Release dates: 7 September 2018 (TIFF); 19 April 2019 (United Kingdom)
- Running time: 101 minutes
- Country: United Kingdom
- Language: English
- Box office: $9.8 million

Red Joan is a 2018 British spy drama film, directed by Trevor Nunn, from a screenplay by Lindsay Shapero. The film stars Sophie Cookson, Stephen Campbell Moore, Tom Hughes, Ben Miles, Nina Sosanya, Tereza Srbova, and Judi Dench.

The film is based on a novel of the same name written by Jennie Rooney, which was itself inspired by the life of Melita Norwood. Norwood worked at the British Non-Ferrous Metals Research Association as a secretary and supplied the Soviet Union with nuclear secrets. The information that Norwood betrayed to the Soviets hastened the pace at which they developed nuclear bomb technology.

Red Joan had its world premiere at the Toronto International Film Festival on 7 September 2018 and was released on 19 April 2019, by Lionsgate in the United Kingdom.

== Plot ==
The young Joan Smith studies physics at Cambridge University. Her Russian Jewish friends Sonya and Leo Galich introduce her to socialists and radical politics. Sonya introduces Leo as her cousin. Joan falls in love with the intense intellectual Leo.

Joan is recruited to work for the wartime Tube Alloys project to build an atomic bomb for Britain and meets scientist Max Davis. Leo tries to recruit Joan to spy for the Soviet Union, but she rejects him and ends their relationship, accusing him of using her. Joan and Max travel by ship to Canada, to work on atomic bomb research. She falls in love with Max, but he ends their relationship saying he wants Joan as his wife, not his mistress, but his wife will never agree to a divorce. Joan and Max visit Montreal, where Leo contacts Joan again at the Université de Montréal, urging her to spy for the Soviet Union, but she again refuses. Joan is appalled by the 1945 atomic bombings of Hiroshima and Nagasaki, and is frightened by suggestions that Britain develop its own atomic bombs for possible use against the Soviet Union. She contacts the Galiches to provide information about the British nuclear programme to the Soviet Union.

Joan finds her work increasingly difficult in the Cold War atmosphere of suspicion and paranoia. After she again accuses Leo of using her, he dies, apparently by suicide although murder by the KGB is later suggested. Sonya flees Britain. Joan learns that Sonya had a child with Leo, adding to her sense of betrayal, and she returns to Max. After the Soviet Union explodes its first atomic bomb in 1949, Max is arrested and charged with espionage for the Soviets. Joan visits Max in prison where he tells her his wife has agreed to a divorce. Joan confesses to Max that she provided the intelligence that led to him being charged. He forgives her. Joan obtains Max's release by blackmailing Sir William Mitchell, a high-ranking diplomat and Soviet spy, who Joan has known since they were in University. She threatens to send a photo of him kissing his long-time male lover to his wife and the tabloids. William agrees to help and reveals that Sonya, not he, has always run the spy ring. Joan and Max escape to Australia with new identities supplied by Mitchell, as the Stanleys.

In 2000, Joan is arrested and charged with espionage. She is interrogated by two Scotland Yard detectives, whom she accuses of misunderstanding her life, but she gradually concedes that she had provided information to the Soviets. The tabloid press vilifies her as a traitor, calling her "Red Joan". Her lawyer son, Nick Stanley, is at first prepared to defend her but disavows her when he learns that she is indeed guilty. Joan eventually convinces him that her only motive was to stop nuclear weapons being used again. He agrees to defend her and stands by her as she faces the tabloid journalists outside her home.

== Cast ==
- Judi Dench as Joan Elizabeth Stanley
  - Sophie Cookson as young Joan Smith
- Nina Sosanya as Ms Hart
- Tom Hughes as Leo Galich
- Tereza Srbova as Sonya
- Stephen Campbell Moore as Professor Max Davis (alias as M. Stanley)
- Ben Miles as Attorney Nick Stanley, son of Joan Stanley and Max
- Freddie Gaminara as William, later Sir William Mitchell
- Raj Swamy as Kharak
- Laurence Spellman as Patrick Adams
- Stephen Boxer as Peter Kierl
- Robin Soans as Clement Attlee
- Kevin Fuller as Detective Philips
- Simon Ludders as Ship's Captain
- Ciarán Owens as Detective Hughes
- Irfan Shamji as Journalist
- Adrian Wheeler as Heckler at Rally
- Steven Hillman as Prison Guard
- James Yeates as Reporter
- Connor Wolf as Student
- Phill Langhorne as Uniformed Officer

== Production ==
The film stars Judi Dench and Sophie Cookson, and is directed by Trevor Nunn. David Parfitt is the producer, and the screenplay is by Lindsay Shapero.

=== Filming ===
Filming was done on location at Cambridge University, in the two colleges featured in the original novel, Newnham College and St. John's College, and elsewhere in and around Cambridge. Some scenes were filmed at The Historic Dockyard Chatham. Farnborough Historic Wind Tunnels were used for a nuclear reactor building. Senate House in London stood in for the Université de Montréal. A Victorian house in Highgate was used for the various bedsits, college rooms and Joan's flat. The unused wing of a hospital in Ilford was used for the interiors of Tube Alloys. The café and lingerie shop were recreated in Hemel Hempstead.

== Release ==
The film had its world première at the Toronto International Film Festival on 7 September 2018. Shortly after, IFC Films acquired U.S. distribution rights to the film. It was released in the United States and in the United Kingdom on 19 April 2019.

=== Box office ===
Red Joan grossed $1.6 million in the United States and Canada and $8.2 million in other countries for a worldwide total of $9.8 million.

=== Critical response ===
On review aggregator Rotten Tomatoes, the film has an approval rating of 30%, based on 151 reviews, with an average rating of 5/10. The site's critics consensus reads, "A fascinating real-life story dramatized in perplexingly dull fashion, Red Joan wastes its tale's incredible intrigue – as well as the formidable talents of Judi Dench." Metacritic reports a normalized score of 45 out of 100, based on 22 critics, indicating "mixed or average reviews". Pamela Hutchinson wrote in The Guardian that the film "can't disguise its mediocrity", while Peter Bradshaw argued that the film "squander[ed] its greatest acting asset". A critic in The Telegraph agreed that "Judi Dench is wasted in this absurd portrayal..."
