= The Inside (film) =

2012 Irish horror thriller film directed by Eoin Macken

- DVD cover
- Directed by: Eoin Macken
- Written by: Eoin Macken
- Produced by: Franco Noonan; Eoin Macken
- Starring: Tereza Srbova; Kellie Blaise; Emmett Scanlan
- Cinematography: Eoin Macken; David Laird
- Edited by: Eoin Macken
- Music by: The Brilliant Things; Greg French; Kevin Whyms
- Production companies: Bounty Films; Black Canvas Pictures
- Distributed by: Monster Pictures/Eureka Video
- Release dates: 26 August 2012 (FrightFest); 3 January 2013 (United Kingdom)
- Running time: 93 minutes
- Country: Ireland
- Language: English

The Inside is a 2012 Irish horror thriller film directed, written and produced by Eoin Macken. The film is about a group of young women who hold a party at a disused warehouse where they are violently attacked by a gang of vagrants before a malevolent, supernatural force is unleashed.

== Plot ==
The film opens with gloomy footage of night-time Dublin and a female radio DJ talking about three girls who recently went missing in the city centre. While in a pawnshop a young man (Eoin Macken) pawns his ring for cash, offered €50 he demands €200, and eventually accepts €75 and a second hand camcorder. He discovers a tape still inside, sits in a cafe, plays back the footage on the camera and watches the film.

In the footage, a group of girls; Sienna (Kellie Blaise), Cara (Tereza Srbova), Louise (Vanessa Fahy) and Sian (Natalia Kostrzewa) are heading out for the 21st birthday of Corina (Siobhan Cullen). As a gift, Sienna and Cara have bought Corina a video camera, with which they plan to record the evening's events. They blindfold Corina and instead of going to a club they break into a disused, abandoned and ramshackled warehouse on a secluded back street, much to Sian's disapproval. Once there, they start drinking, Corina's boyfriend Barry (Sean Stewart) arrives, and they reminisce and share secrets. After Barry leads Sian to a toilet, the remaining girls complain and back-stab about Sian. Louise then takes the camera and discovers Barry having sex with Sian.

Then three vagrant, violent men; Eamo (Brian Fortune), Scat (Karl Argue) and Hughie (Emmett Scanlan) break in and gatecrash the party. They terrorise, verbally torment, abuse, and physically and sexually assault the women, and the women scream and wail in fear and despair. Sienna tries to confront them only to be head-butted by Hughie. When Barry tries to intervene, Hughie beats him to death and instigates a game of spin the bottle to rape the women. Whilst Sian is being raped by Eamo, the lights go out, odd sounds emanate from the building, old televisions switch themselves on and a baby's haunting cries are heard. Moments later, Eamo is yanked from Sian by an unseen force, quickly followed by Sian herself.

The negative energy from the brutality of the vagrants awakens a dormant, malevolent, demonic, supernatural force with a thirst for flesh and souls within the building. A brave Cara and hysterical Louise take the camcorder around the building, and try and escape using the narrow beam of the camera's built-in light via the labyrinthine, brick basements with decrepit corridors. They are approached by Scat who is hysterical about something he has seen and begs them not to leave him alone. After shutting the door behind him, they find a dead Corina with her eyes gouged out. They then notice arches and ominous, arcane symbols and shapes signs on the walls in the dark. Louise enters a trance and is approached by a shambling, ghoulish, gore-covered, malign, emaciated naked figure (Patrick Moynan).

A distressed Cara runs away and finds Sienna, they continue trying to find a way out from room to room but are trapped in the building. They are found by Hughie and shortly followed by The Creature. They break through a door leaving them behind, Sienna picks another lock, then Cara also enters a trance and is taken by The Creature. Sienna runs off through decrepit brick basements to a catacomb in an effort to evade The Creature, she discovers a dead workman and hides from The Creature before being followed and stalked by it, she then runs back, escapes from the warehouse and abandons the camcorder.

After finishing watching the video, The Man uses the footage as a guide to retrace the steps to where the events occurred. The man tracks down the warehouse and makes his way into the basement. He walks into the aftermath and finds Sian and Louise. Sian cries for help as The Creature approaches, The Man tells her to be quiet and hides, she is then attacked and consumed by The Creature. After The Creature leaves, The Man then tries to rescue Louise, but while in a hypnotic trance she hits him over the head with a stone, escapes from the warehouse and is hit by a car.

== Cast ==
- Tereza Srbova as Cara
- Kellie Blaise as Sienna
- Siobhán Cullen as Corina
- Natalia Kostrzewa as Sian
- Vanessa Fahy as Louise
- Sean Stewart as Barry
- Emmett Scanlan as Hughie
- Karl Argue as Scat
- Brian Fortune as Eamo
- Eoin Macken as The Man
- Patrick Moynan as The Creature
- Jenny Huston as Radio DJ
- Liam Alex Heffron as Dead Workman

== Production ==
The Inside was shot on a prosumer HD camcorder in six days. The assault scene was performed in a single 14-minute take. Eoin Macken states in the making-of that there are a lot of things in Irish history to inspire horror films; and he eschews banshees, leprechauns, and sídhe in favor of something more abstractly-formed (partly inspired by the worst in man, as well as possibly a paucity of imagination).

== Release ==
The Inside premiered at Empire, Leicester Square as part of the London FrightFest Film Festival on 26 August 2012.

The film was released in UK cinemas on 3 January 2013. The DVD of the film was released on 25 March 2013. The film's UK television premiere was on the Horror Channel on 2 December 2013.

== Reception ==
Review aggregator Rotten Tomatoes has collected one negative review, resulting in a 33% approval rating.

Tom Jollife of Scream Magazine said "Like Rec, The Inside is one of the most terrifying found footage films ever," and described the film as "Paranormal Activity meets The Blair Witch Project...On steroids. Brilliant!" FlickeringMyth.com said "It's well acted, very naturalistic, but again, on a cinematic level, it's not easy to watch. The film is most interesting in the middle third as the film turns supernatural and we follow the camera holder and whoever she happens to be with. It's quite involving, making good use of a very creepy setting, especially the underground caverns." Mark Adams of Screen Daily said "The violence is quite nasty, with the hand-held camerawork making it even more intense." Wayne Simmons Zombie Hamster described the film as a "very effective film that shows with the right care and attention, and a talented cast and crew... It's well shot and produced with the best possible use made of its set..." Golden State Haunts And Events said "The Inside is a hard, violent, visceral psychological horror, which gets into your belly, and leaves an unnerving disturbed feeling after watching it."

Cine Outsider felt "the basics of a decent if unadventurous Found Footage horror are certainly here, and as someone who still has a soft spot for the subgenre and a fondness for torch-lit sequences set in dark and crumbling basements, I really wanted to like it a lot more than I did." Stuart Willis of Sex Gore Mutants said "The Inside starts in a fairly unpromising manner but soon picks up thanks to the performances... The scenes where the guys terrorise the lasses is authentically intense, bringing to mind the infamous home invasion sequence from Henry: Portrait of a Serial Killer. Even the score at this point is reminiscent of John McNaughton's essential chiller..." They added the "film could probably terrify someone with little or no experience of the modern horror genre... the first 40 minutes are its most interesting and that the lack of original ideas in its latter half seriously hampered its clearly passionate attempts to scare audiences witless." Horrorphilia said of the film "you don't have any character development at all... it is above average for a first person horror film... If you are a huge first person point of view type of horror fan lover then it's definitely worth a watch."

Joel Harley of Horror Talk said "despite the obvious ambition and talent behind the camera, the thing about The Inside is that it's actually unwatchable..." Screen Jabber said "The camera never stays still... Despite being a supposedly unedited recording, the film still cuts and the camera develops suspiciously artistic faults only at key points where it enhances the story. Brilliantly, this amateur footage being watched straight off a handycam comes with an ominous electronic score. The screenplay is nails on a blackboard excruciating. The girls alone are shrill, and annoyingly crass..." Brutal As Hell called it "...lazy, nonsensical, misogynistic, classist and a monumental waste of time... The Inside does nothing more than establish some horrible characters to be killed by some standard boogeyman, with no imagination, flair or talent in its repetitive execution."

Becky Bartlett of FrightFest said "The Inside is dull – filled with characters it is impossible to care about, flitting between psychological human chiller and unexplained, supernatural horror, with a desperately tedious screenplay, this is a confused movie with tacked on additions to compensate for a lack of focus or an interesting concept." Anton Bitel of Little White Lies thought "The Inside offers a stale vision of inescapable entrapment that you, like these hapless partygoers, will wish would just end - and then suddenly it does, in a manner both arbitrary and unsatisfying. Dull to look at, and not much going on inside either." Russ Gomm of Chris and Phil Present thought "If the film wasn't so painfully dull and technically inefficient it might have been able to take a reasonable idea and turn it into an interesting ten-minute short film, but this is not worthy feature film material." Dread Central said the "'found footage' nightmare that will likely have even the most ardent fans of the subgenre legitimately debating whether the format is one of the worst things to ever happen in the world of horror."

== See also ==
- Found footage (pseudo-documentary)
