= A Nightingale Falling =

- Film poster
- Directed by: Garret Daly; Martina McGlynn
- Written by: Garret Daly; Martina McGlynn
- Story by: Pj Curtis
- Produced by: Garret Daly; Martina McGlynn; Gerry Burke; Pj Curtis
- Starring: Tara Breathnach; Muireann Bird; Gerard McCarthy; Brian Fortune; Elliot Moriarty; Andy Kellegher; Rosemary Henderson; Michael James Ford; Mark Tankersley; Blathnaid Ryan; Maura Clancy; Derek O'Sullivan
- Cinematography: Garret Daly
- Edited by: James Daly
- Music by: Graeme Stewart
- Production company: Mixed Bag Media
- Distributed by: Great Movies
- Release date: 12 September 2014 (Ireland)
- Running time: 110 minutes
- Country: Ireland
- Language: English

A Nightingale Falling is a 2014 Irish film set during the Irish War of Independence based on the 2012 novel by PJ Curtis. Directed by Garret Daly and Martina McGlynn, and written by Daly, the film stars Tara Breathnach, Muireann Bird and Gerard McCarthy. The story concerns two sisters who care for a wounded soldier. The film was released in Irish cinemas in September 2014, and received its Irish television premiere on UTV Ireland on Easter Sunday, 5 April 2015.

== Cast ==
- Tara Breathnach as May Collingwood
- Muireann Bird as Tilly Collingwood
- Gerard McCarthy as Captain Shearing
- Brian Fortune as Tom Nolan
- Elliot Moriarty as Jackie Nolan
- Andy Kellegher as Black & Tan
