= Cardinal Gibbons High School (Fort Lauderdale, Florida) =

Catholic school in the United States

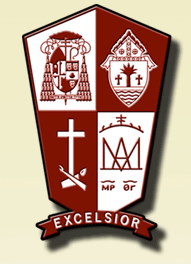
- 2900 NE 47th Street, Fort Lauderdale, Florida, 33308, United States

Information
- Type: Private secondary school
- Motto: "Excelsior" (Latin: Ever Onward)
- Religious affiliation: Roman Catholic
- Established: 1961
- Oversight: Archdiocese of Miami
- Principal: Oscar Cedeño
- Grades: 9–12
- Enrollment: 1,175 (2017–18)
- Colors: Red and white
- Nickname: Chiefs
- Website: cghsfl.org

Cardinal Gibbons High School, commonly known as Cardinal Gibbons or CGHS, is a private, Roman Catholic college-preparatory school in Fort Lauderdale, Florida. Cardinal Gibbons High School was established in 1961 and was named after James Gibbons, the second Cardinal in the United States. CGHS is operated under the authority of the Roman Catholic Archdiocese of Miami.

== History ==
Cardinal Gibbons High School was established in September 1961 by Archbishop Coleman F. Carroll as a Coeducational, gender-separate secondary educational institution. Archbishop Carroll appointed Thomas A. Dennehy as the first supervising principal, with Marie Schramko heading the Girls’ Division and Henry Mirowski leading the Boys’ Division. The school opened its doors to 176 freshmen and sophomores in two campus buildings. Over the years, the school expanded to include eleventh and twelfth grades, an enlarged faculty, and new facilities such as a field house, science wing, cafeteria, gymnasium, and additional classrooms—ultimately growing to ten academic buildings. Today, the 18-acre campus features ten buildings, along with an interactive Media and Technology Center, four state-of-the-art science labs, a 300-seat chapel, and athletic fields for baseball and football.

In 1972, the school merged both genders. On June 17, 1973, Joseph Huck was appointed to succeed Dennehy as supervising principal. From September 1974 to December 2002, Joseph J. Kershner served as supervising principal. Upon Kershner's retirement on December 2, 2002, Paul D. Ott was appointed interim principal. His appointment as principal became effective July 1, 2003.

In 2019, Cardinal Gibbons transitioned to a President/Principal leadership model. Thomas Mahon, former Vice Principal and previous Dean of Students, was appointed President/CEO, while Oscar Cedeño, formerly Dean of Students, became Principal. In 2021, the school returned to the traditional Principal/Vice Principal structure, with Cedeño. In 2021, a new academic wing was added to the school for fine arts and STEM activities, totaling 10 buildings.

== Crest ==
In the upper right-hand corner is the crest of the Archdiocese of Miami, a palm tree planted between two crosses. The flowing waters surrounding the base of the crest signify the State of Florida. In the upper left-hand corner is the coat of arms of James Cardinal Gibbons with the words, “Emitte Spiritum Tuum,” meaning "Send forth thy Spirit." In 1886 Gibbons was elevated to Cardinal Archbishop of Baltimore, becoming the second American to attain that rank in the Catholic Church.

The bottom half of the crest is reserved for the shields of the two religious communities who have taught at Cardinal Gibbons. The one to the left is the Franciscan emblem, the stigmata of Saint Francis extended over the hand of Christ. The one to the right is the Piarist emblem. On the Piarist shield is Mary, the Mother of God, in Greek lettering. Her crown above the Latin "Maria" symbolizes her endless reign over the Order and her inspirational guidance over schools.

Stretching across the bottom of the Crest is the Latin word "Excelsior," the school motto, encouraging the students "ever onward.”

== Notable alumni ==
=== Actor ===
- John O'Hurley - Actor, comedian, singer, author, game show host and television personality

=== Baseball ===
- Josh Fogg - Former MLB pitcher who played for several teams between 2001 and 2009.
- Ryan Shealy - Former professional baseball player who played six seasons as a first baseman

=== Basketball ===
- Taurean Green - Former professional basketball player who is now an Assistant Coach, Player Development for the Florida Gators

=== Football ===
- Coleman Bennett - Football running back; son of Donnell
- Donnell Bennett - Former football fullback in the NFL for the Kansas City Chiefs and Washington Commanders
- Christian Blake - Professional football player
- Khris Bogle - Football defensive end for the Michigan State Spartans. Previously played for the Florida Gators
- Jason Bostic - Former football defensive back for the Philadelphia Eagles and Buffalo Bills
- Tron LaFavor - Former professional football defensive back for the Chicago Bears
- R.J. McIntosh - Football defensive back for the Saskatchewan Roughriders of the Canadian Football League
- Ahmad Moten Sr. - Football defensive tackle for the Miami Hurricanes
- Kamari Moulton - Football running back for the Iowa Hawkeyes
- Dylan Rizk - Football quarterback for the Stanford Cardinal. Previously played for the UCF Knights
- R Mason Thomas - Professional football defensive end for the Kansas City Chiefs
- Blair Walsh - Former professional football player who was a placekicker in the NFL for six seasons

=== Government ===
- Michael Ferguson - Member of the Florida House of Representatives from the 100th district (2026–present)

=== Military ===
- Eric Golnick - American veteran of the United States Navy and an advocate for mental healthcare among military veterans

=== Racing ===
- Ryan Hunter-Reay - Professional racing driver best known as a winner of both the Indianapolis 500 and the IndyCar Series

=== Swimming ===
- Anamarija Petricevic - Olympian 1988 Seoul, European Champion, World Championship finalist and World Cup multiple medalist, Hall of Fame Induction Class of 2024-2025.
