= Strike Back: Vendetta =

British-American action television series

- No. of episodes: 10

Release
- Original network: Sky One; Cinemax
- Original release: 14 February – 28 April 2020

Season chronology
- ← Previous; Revolution

Strike Back: Vendetta (sometimes referred to as Strike Back: The Final Season) is a ten-part British action television series, and serves as the eighth and final series of Strike Back. The series features returning cast members Daniel MacPherson, Warren Brown, Alin Sumarwata, Jamie Bamber and Varada Sethu. The series made its premiere on 14 February 2020.

Vendetta takes place some time after the events of Revolution. Section 20 are given a mission to stop two brothers from unleashing a series of terrorist attacks against the West, but gradually uncover a conspiracy between Western intelligence agencies.

== Cast ==
Section 20

- Daniel MacPherson as Sergeant Samuel Wyatt, US Joint Special Operations Command
- Warren Brown as Sergeant Thomas "Mac" McAllister, British Army (ex-United Kingdom Special Forces)
- Alin Sumarwata as Lance Corporal Gracie Novin, Australian Army Special Operations Command
- Jamie Bamber as Colonel Alexander Coltrane, British Army, the commanding officer of Section 20
- Varada Sethu as Lance Corporal Manisha Chetri, British Army

Law enforcement and government officials

- John Michie as Sir James Spencer, the Deputy Chief of MI6
- Jacob Fortune-Lloyd as Constable Yoni Spiegel, Israel Police
- Lorraine Burroughs as Carolyn Fortier, Senior Supervisor of the CIA Directorate of Operations
- Yasemin Allen as Katrina Zarkova, a former Captain within the FSB's Alpha Group

Russian Military

- John Albasiny as Lieutenant Colonel Lev Kogan, deputy director of the Combined Armed Centre for Electronic Warfare
- Semir Krivić as Sebastian Levkin, Foreign Intelligence Service

Antagonists

- Goran Bogdan as Edon Demachi, the leader of the Demachi crime family
- Ivana Miličević as Arianna Demachi/Elena Stabokina, Edon's wife and the Demarchi family matriarch, who is also a deep-cover agent for Russia.
- Maxim Baldry as Loric Demachi, Edon and Arianna's son
- Tomi May as Jovan Nishani/Branko Hajrovic, a former Bosnian Serb Army officer and enforcer for the Demarchi family
- Alec Secareanu as Zayef Hiraji, a Bosnian Muslim terrorist, and Mahir's younger brother
- Bamshad Abedi-Amin as Mahir Hiraji, a Bosnian Muslim terrorist and Zayef's older brother
- Arty Froushan as Nadav Topal, a Palestinian drug dealer and taxi driver
- Daniel Donskoy as Danny Dahan, an Israeli drug runner
- Thomas Levin as Yada Haim, an Israeli crime boss and property developer
- Marjan Radanovich as Sluchevsky, a Russian sniper and assassin
- Yayan Ruhian as Kabul, a CIA asset tasked with assassinating Section 20 to cover up the agency's war crimes.

== Episodes ==
No. overall	No. in season	Title	Directed by	Written by	U.S. air date	U.S. viewers (millions)	U.K. air date	U.K. viewers (millions)
67	1	Episode 1	Paul Wilmshurst & Bill Eagles	Jack Lothian	14 February 2020	0.077	25 February 2020	0.441
Section 20 are sent to Pristina, Kosovo to extract a hostage, Dr. Helen McCluskey, from the Albanian mafia. She reveals she told them about a strain of Marburg virus the British have developed as a bioweapon, improved on from Serbian research during the Balkan War. She informs the team Coltrane has been given orders to kill her for trying to blow the whistle about the research. The team escape, but McCluskey is killed by Jovan, a mafia enforcer. The mafia raid McCluskey’s lab and escape with the bioweapon samples, engaging in a firefight when Section 20 arrive. Novin accidentally kills a civilian in the confusion and Jovan is captured. Coltrane meets with the Deputy Chief Spencer of MI6 in Macedonia, who emphasises the British government want the weapon captured as to not implicate them if it is used in a terror attack. Edon Demachi, the mafia leader, returns home and speaks to his son about his impending arranged marriage to a member of the Vironi crime family to end a blood feud. The Demachis travel to Venice to sell the virus, followed by Section 20. Coltrane interrogates Jovan, believing him to be Branko Hajrovic, a Serbian military officer he encountered in Bosnia who was behind the massacre of a village. Jovan denies this, but reveals Demachi is providing a virus sample to the buyers, who Chetri identifies as men representing someone named Zayef. Mac and Wyatt narrowly stop one releasing the sample in the city. Novin hesitates, allowing another to escape. Coltrane and Jovan are attacked in the hospital by Demachi hitmen, and Jovan later dies after confessing he is Branko.
68	2	Episode 2	Paul Wilmshurst	Jack Lothian	21 February 2020	0.059	3 March 2020	0.808
Edon Demachi reveals to Arianna that they are in $8 million of debt, but he will clear it when paid for the virus. Hoping to utilise Loric’s dislike of his father, Section 20 tracks him down to a strip club to recruit him, and although a firefight breaks out he agrees to take a tracker from Novin. Mac accepts Coltrane's offer to send him for officer training. Returning home, the Demachis are met by the Vironi patriarch who calls off the arranged marriage between the families, resulting in Edon and Arianna killing him. Intercepting the bioweapon buyer in Albania, Mac learns that Zayef and his brother Mahir Hiraji are Bosnian Muslims seeking revenge against the west due to inaction of UN and NATO forces during the Bosnian War, in which they lost their family. The team intercept Mahir and Demachi making the deal on a train to Tirana, but Zayef’s men ambush the train and kill Demachi’s men after they obtain the weapon. Mac kills an injured Demachi and obtains the weapon’s tracker. Section 20 attack the jihadis and incinerate the virus using explosives, but the brothers escape. Coltrane becomes concerned their decision to abandon the bioweapon means the brothers are pursuing something more dangerous. Arianna Demachi vows to hunt down Section 20 to avenge her husband’s death.
69	3	Episode 3	Bill Eagles	James Dormer & Jack Lothian	28 February 2020	0.063	10 March 2020	0.69
Military scientist Lev Kogan steals a classified project named Imperiya from a facility in Tambov and escapes. In Tel Aviv, Section 20 believe Kogan to be the seller Zayef is meeting with and prepare to capture him, but he escapes in a taxi driven by Nadav Topal, after also being pursued by Captain Katrina Zarkova. Zarkova reveals that Imperiya is a devastating cryptoviral Trojan horse developed by the Russian Combined Armed Centre for Electronic Warfare, and agrees to work with the team to capture Kogan. Tracking him to an apartment building, they engage in a firefight with drug dealer Danny Dohan, a friend of Topal’s who helps him steal the device after discovering it is value. Zarkova kills Kogan, only to be betrayed by her handler after obtaining intel from Section 20. She kills him and returns to Section 20. Befriending Israel Police constable Yoni Speigel from the shootout, Mac discovers the Hirajis are entering the country via bus from Jordan. However when he and Wyatt attempt to intercept them, Spiegel arrives with backup who are gunned down by Hiraji’s men. Topal gives Imperiya to Yada Haim, a crime boss and property developer hoping he can secure a buyer and receive a cut. Coltrane, Chetri and Novin infiltrate a party hosted by Haim to obtain Imperiya, and succeed with help from Zarkova. However, the venue is besieged by gangsters led by Danny, who comes to Topal's rescue after he is betrayed by Haim.
70	4	Episode 4	Bill Eagles	James Dormer & Jack Lothian	6 March 2020	0.034	17 March 2020	0.553
Zayef and his men escape from the bus station, with Spiegel blaming Mac and Wyatt for the death of his men. Danny realises the lockbox has been taken, and the team exit the mansion whilst engaging in a firefight with his men, but Novin is captured and Topal kills Haim. Zarkova helps track Danny to a building in Neve Sha'anan using SVR intelligence, but Coltrane is ordered by Spencer to eliminate her and secure Imperiya in exchange for him authorising Novin's rescue. Topal is contacted on Kogan's burner phone by Zayef, who still wishes to make the deal. Danny tortures Novin with suffocation for the lockbox code, but she breaks free and rejoins the arriving team, who are able to escape when Coltrane assists with sniper fire and kills Dahan. Topal is killed by Spiegel, who recovers Imperiya. Mac, Novin and Zarkova steal the device from evidence, but the police station is attacked by Zayef's men and Spiegel is killed. Chetri informs Zarkova of the kill order, so she abandons Mac and Novin during a shootout with the jihadis, but is quickly rammed off the road by Zayef, who takes the device. The team catch her up and find themselves outgunned by the jhadis, causing Coltrane to rescind the kill order and rely on her to provide cover fire. He reports her as killed in action to Spencer and the Russians and provides her with a Slovak passport to start a new life outside the military.
71	5	Episode 5	Jon Jones	Jack Lothian	13 March 2020	0.093	24 March 2020	0.244
Having gone into hiding in Sarajevo, Zayef kills one of his men in a fit of unstable rage, which concerns his brother. Mahir later meets with a local allied terror cell, but is tracked and kidnapped by Section 20. During interrogation, he reveals knowledge that Mac got his previous team killed, indicating he has accessed classified British military documents. After Chetri finds a tracker in his pendant, the site is overrun by Zayef's men. Mac surrenders Mahir to save the team when they run low on ammunition. Coltrane, though furious at his decision, agrees to travel to Münich after Mac insists Mahir responded to the city's name during interrogation. The team receives intel Zayef plans to upload Imperiya to the Münich Stock Exchange and then attack a United Nations Security Conference in the city. Coltrane informs Spencer of the developments. The Hirajis activate Imperiya, but Zayef reveals Mahir has betrayed him to an unknown party and straps him to a suicide vest. Mahir is caught by the team, telling them his brother is at a nearby apartment block and the conference attack was a ruse, but the device detonates before he can reveal who he was working for. Whilst Novin and Chetri triage casualties, Mac pursues Zayef alone without comms and discovers him meeting with Arianna Demachi, but is wounded from a shot to the neck as the two escape.
72	6	Episode 6	Jon Jones	Jack Lothian	20 March 2020	0.059	31 March 2020	0.61
Some time after the Münich incident, Mac has quit Section 20 and has started a new life back in England with a wife and daughter. He believes that he is being stalked by a yellow car and tries to convince Wyatt and Novin that it is driven by an associate of Zayef when the two visit him. Mac becomes infuriated when they do not believe him. He begins seeing a psychotherapist to cope with his post-traumatic stress disorder and slowly opens up about his military life. Mac expresses regrets over not being able to save the lives of many of the people that had helped him, including a disillusioned Taliban sniper who aided him in Afghanistan, but was later killed via enhanced interrogation. However, his psychotherapist persuades him that he made a difference. The entire episode is then shown to have been an hallucination as Mac bleeds out in the corridor while Section 20 try to save him. The yellow car that has been haunting him is revealed to be a toy car lying beside him, and a drawing by his daughter the graffiti on the walls of the apartment block. Despite Wyatt and Novin's best efforts, Mac dies of his wounds, but is shown to be in peace in his fading hallucination.
73	7	Episode 7	John Strickland	Jack Lothian	27 March 2020	0.100	7 April 2020	0.664
Section 20 coordinates a raid of a terrorist training camp in Bosnia to extract financier Riad Sharif, hoping he can lead them to Zayef. They find him dead, and barely escape from his men. Coltrane confides in Spencer about his guilt over Mac's death. Using intel from Sharif and facial recognition on Munich CCTV footage, Chetri discovers Loric Demarchi was in the housing complex where Mac was killed 43 minutes before the Imperiya attack. Meanwhile, the Demarchi's have been consolidating their power over the Albanian mafia since Edon's death, killing the heads of three out of the four the ruling families. The fourth, arms dealer Daniel Kalmedi, is spared, but refuses to cooperate and escapes. Loric and Arianna agree to sell Kalmedi's supply of military grade weapons to Zayef so he can unite and arm terror cells across Europe; in exchange, Zayef will lead them to Section 20. Kalmedi is tracked by the team to an airfield in Tepelenë, where they rescue him from the Demarchi's men. Loric and Zayef break into a bank and steal a safety deposit box where Kalmedi kept the location codes for his stockpile. However, a dying Kalmedi provides Chetri with the codes as well. The team locate the stockpile at the Port of Durrës, but upon entry find themselves in a kill box. They are ambushed by Arianna's men, which she tells Coltrane by phone is gjakmarrja, or revenge for her husband's death.
74	8	Episode 8	John Strickland	Jack Lothian	3 April 2020	0.089	14 April 2020	0.647
Section 20 escapes the ambush and successfully board the ship containing Zayef and the weapons shipment on the Adriatic Sea. Despite being given a kill order by Spencer, Coltrane tells Wyatt and Novin to bring in Zayef alive, concerned they are involved in a conspiracy due to the Hidjaris' knowledge of Marburg virus and Imperiya device, and that Spencer knew information about Mac that Coltrane never disclosed. Captured and his weapons destroyed, Zayef tells the team both Mahir and Sharif were deep cover agents with MI6 and the CIA involved in false flag terrorism operations, and he has also been set up to provide an excuse for military intervention in the Balkans. He takes them to a hard drive containing evidence of Mahir's activities at his village in Bosnia, but Spencer arrives with private military contractors shortly after, having been tipped off by Chetri. He explains intervention in the region was necessary to stop the flow of weapons to European terror cells, but the whole group is then attacked by a CIA hit squad operating on Fortier's orders trying to cover up the agency's involvement in the affair. Although they fight off the men, Spencer is killed and Coltrane executes Zayef when the latter confesses he let Mac die a slow death. Despite wanting to be removed from a military blacklist, Chetri abandons the team with the hard drive as she does not want the conspiracy to be covered up. Meanwhile, Arianna kills her own son to assume the role of family matriarch, cementing her position of power. She is later revealed to be a deep cover Russian agent, and is congratulated by her handler on securing the Russian military's ties with the Albanian criminal underworld.
75	9	Episode 9	Bill Eagles	Jack Lothian	10 April 2020	0.044	21 April 2020	0.643
After a minor firefight in Albania, both Section 20 and Fortier reach an impasse on finding Chetri, and the two groups reluctantly agree to work together on bringing her in alive. From a CIA station in Zagreb, Croatia they track her to a meeting in the city with Sgt. Mark Weathercombe, a member of the Royal Military Police SIB. However, it is revealed that Weathercombe is being blackmailed by the Krasnyye Volki, a covert Russian military unit under Arianna's orders, who kill him and kidnap Chetri during a firefight with the team. Fortier and her staff are killed when hidden explosives detonate in the station. Retreating to a CIA safe house, Novin theorises the Russians want Hiraji's intel to gain power over the British and American governments. Coltrane reluctantly contacts Zarkova, who uncovers the lone survivor of the station attack, analyst Bruno Rodgers, is a Russian double agent, and also unveils Arianna Demarchi's identity as a Russian operative. Novin and Wyatt apprehend Rogers before he is repatriated, and learn Chetri is being taken to a black site in Crimea. Chetri is brutally interrogated by Arianna's men at the site, and she appears to capitulate and give them access to the cloud site where she stored Hiraji's intel. However, the code activates a virus that destroys the data when it is accessed. Novin, Coltrane and Wyatt parachute into the area to extract her, but are unable to penetrate the interrogation room, and are forced to watch Arianna execute Chetri and escape. Exiting the site, they agree to split up and meet across the border in two days. Four months later, Coltrane is shown to be interned in a Russian work camp in Siberia.
76	10	Episode 10	Bill Eagles	Jack Lothian	17 April 2020	0.133	28 April 2020	0.744
Wyatt helps Coltrane escape from the prison camp after bribing a guard, but before leaving he confronts another prisoner in the infirmary; the analyst who worked with Arianna when Chetri was killed. He discovers the GRU is investing $250 million in Arianna, using her to take over the Albanian mafia and establish links with organised crime throughout Europe. Novin interrogates Arianna's former handler Sevastian Levkin at a casino in Yerevan, Armenia, and executes him to avenge Chetri. Coltrane reveals Arianna is due to receive the money in the garrison town of Nova Golensk on the Black Sea, and proposes destroying the majority of it, stealing the rest and killing Arianna. Wyatt questions the morality of doing so, viewing it as a vengeful criminal act as opposed to a military operation. Realizing the move to not be expected by the Russians due to its unlikelihood of success, the team manages to break into the military tunnels underneath the town and find the vault containing the money. They take $15 million for themselves and use explosives to blow up the remaining pallets, but are forced to leave without Arianna when they are detected. The team break into a restaurant and offer the owner the stolen money to get them a doctor for Novin, who had been shot during the escape. However, he notices the notes all have identical serial numbers, revealing Arianna switched the pallets with counterfeit currency before the team arrived. Months later, Arianna has betrayed her Russian handlers and the Albanians, using the money to flee and start anew in Guanajuato, Mexico. She is tracked down by Coltrane, who executes her. Coltrane is met by a fully healed Novin and Wyatt to discuss their future. Revealing they are no longer blacklisted, Coltrane attempts to convince the two to stay in Section 20, but they politely refuse and part ways.
