= Eric Golnick =

- Military career
- Allegiance: United States
- Branch: United States Navy

Eric Golnick is an American veteran of the United States Navy and an advocate for mental healthcare among military veterans, with a particular emphasis on preventing United States military veteran suicide. He grew up in a military family and graduated with honors from the University of Miami, earning a Bachelor of Arts in 2009 and a Master of Arts in International Administration in 2014. After commissioning as a Naval Officer, Golnick participated in operations across Asia, including the response to the 2011 Tōhoku earthquake and tsunami.

Following his military service, which included experiences that led to overcoming challenges with alcohol and PTSD, Golnick became a vocal advocate for veterans' mental health. He has been a Senior Policy Analyst at U.S. Southern Command and later as a Strategic Planner at the Natick Army Research Labs. In 2016, he co-founded Forge Health, where he is CEO, focusing on providing mental health and substance abuse treatment for veterans, first responders, and their families.

Forge Health has partnered with the Veterans Administration to expand mental health services and has adapted its offerings to include telemedicine during the COVID-19 pandemic. Golnick has testified before Congress on veterans' mental health issues and has received recognition for his work, including an honorary Doctor of Humane Letters from the University of Miami in 2023.

== Early life and education ==
Golnick grew up in a military family. He attended Cardinal Gibbons High School in Fort Lauderdale, Florida. He graduated with a bachelor's degree with honors from the University of Miami in 2009 and later completed a master's in International Administration at the University of Miami in 2014. He attended Officer Candidate School in 2009 and was commissioned as a Naval Officer. Golnick has credited his experiences at the University of Miami for shaping his approach to leadership and career development.

== Military service ==
During his military service, Golnick was involved in operations and exercises across Asia. He worked for the Commander of U.S. Naval Forces in Japan and participated in contingency operations during the 2011 Tōhoku earthquake and tsunami, and nuclear meltdown at the Fukushima nuclear power plant. These experiences, along with witnessing the suicide of a fellow sailor and facing challenges as a gay Naval officer under the military's “don’t ask, don’t tell” policy, contributed to Golnick's decision to leave active duty.

Golnick later took on the role of Senior Policy Analyst and Legal Protections Process program manager in the Policy and Strategic Initiatives Division, J-5 Directorate, U.S. Southern Command Headquarters in Doral, Florida, from 2012 to 2016. He later was a Strategic Planner at the Natick Army Research Labs in Natick, Massachusetts. He has worked with the United States President's National Security Council, the Office of the Secretary of Defense, the Joint Chiefs of Staff, and the U.S. Congress on many topics regarding U.S. foreign policy and veterans affairs.

After leaving the military, he began to drink alcohol excessively. He developed Post-traumatic stress disorder from his time in the United States military. He eventually got sober and found a therapist who understood military culture. These events later informed his work in advocating for mental health care for veterans.

== Post-military career ==
=== Forge Health and VFR (Veterans and First Responders) healthcare ===
In 2016, Golnick co-founded Forge Health and ias the CEO of Forge VFR Healthcare (Veteran and First Responder Healthcare), focusing on providing care for substance abuse and mental health issues to veterans, first responders, and their families. He founded the organization based on his own experience with substance abuse and the challenges of finding culturally competent treatment as a veteran. The first facility opened in Manchester, New Hampshire.

Forge Health partnered with the Veterans Administration in 2018 to expand mental health care services to veteran communities, contributing to the National Strategy for Preventing Veteran Suicide. During the COVID-19 pandemic, Forge Health extended its services to include telemedicine, offering care for veterans, first responders, and their families. Forge Health offers various services, including intensive outpatient group therapy for substance use and mental health issues, telehealth therapy, and brief treatment options for those facing the challenges of the COVID-19 pandemic. The organization aims to provide veterans with timely access to treatment and support underserved populations, including women, LGBTQ veterans, and those with any discharge status.

=== Congressional testimony ===
Golnick has testified before Congress on topics related to veterans' mental health care, suicide prevention, and substance abuse treatment, advocating for improved access to care for veterans.

=== Honorary degree and recognition ===
In May 2023, Golnick spoke at the undergraduate degree ceremony for the University of Miami's College of Arts and Sciences and Division of Continuing and International Education, where he was given an honorary doctorate. In his speech, he shared his experiences with PTSD, substance abuse, and his transition to co-founding Forge Health. He encouraged graduates to prepare for life's hardships and emphasized the importance of mental and physical health.

He was announced as part of the 2021 Class of the Stand-To Veteran Leadership Program through the Bush Institute.

=== Advocacy ===
Eric Golnick has made contributions to veteran and first responder advocacy, particularly concerning mental health and community support. Golnick has written about the vulnerability of former military members to extremist ideologies, particularly following their transition to civilian life, due to factors like unaddressed trauma, substance use, and a diminished sense of belonging.

==== LGBTQ ====
He has been involved in LGBTQ mental health advocacy in the U.S. military. In June 2020, Representative Chris Pappas (NH-01) convened a roundtable with Golnick to address the unique challenges faced by LGBTQIA veterans and first responders and to discuss a newly organized therapy group tailored for their needs.

==== Mental health ====
He is an advocate for suicide prevention among veterans, focusing on the urgent need for mental health and substance abuse support. He collaborates with the VA to provide immediate assistance, addressing the rising suicide rates among younger veterans and emphasizing the importance of family support in the healing process. He emphasizes the importance of proactive strategies for veterans and first responders to combat seasonal affective disorder (SAD) and depression during winter. He has sought to support veterans who are affected by fireworks during holiday celebrations. He had a conversation with Robert Asencio about PTSD and substance abuse.

==== COVID-19 pandemic ====
He addressed the immediate emotional toll of COVID-19 pandemic on healthcare workers, including exhaustion and anxiety, and stresses the importance of self-care and seeking therapy to prevent long-term PTSD. He also spoke out about the need to support military veterans during the pandemic.
