= Peter Oxford =

Australian dancer and entrepreneur (born 1970)

- Born: July 23, 1970 (age 56); Mount Druitt
- Occupation: Dance industry professional
- Known for: Founder of Showcase Australian Dance Championships (Showcase Dance), Hollywood Bound Championship

Peter Oxford (born July 23, 1970) is an Australian dancer and entrepreneur, best known for founding the Showcase Australian Dance Championships.

== Career ==
Oxford grew up in Mount Druitt, Sydney, Australia, having been adopted at the age of one. He started dancing at a young age, performing on various television and stage shows, and winning international competitions in the United States and Australia. He founded the Oxford Academy of Dance in Sydney in 1988, directing it until 2000.

In March 1994, he founded Showcase Dance, Australia's first national dance competition. Starting with about 7,000 acts per year, it grew to 19,000 by 2016, and has been held in 20 cities in Australia and New Zealand. In 1995 he founded the Dancer of the Year Pageant. In 2015 he founded a second competition called Hollywood Bound, which takes place at the same time as Showcase.

Outside of Australia, Oxford has judged dance competitions in the United States, Canada, Portugal, New Zealand and Singapore, and has produced shows in the US & Malaysia. In 2007 he hosted the World Dance Championship in Las Vegas. Oxford has worked to improve government regulations and safety requirements for the Australian dance industry. In 2014 he called a national meeting for major dance groups, studios and Ausdance representatives, to draft proposals for "establish a national governing body, a comprehensive child-safety training program and an accreditation scheme."

Oxford also started Australia's first gay cruise, "All Gay Cruises", in 2007, in partner with P&O Cruise Lines. In 2009 he produced Australia's second gay cruise out of Adelaide.

== Personal life ==
Oxford lives in Rosebery, New South Wales. .

== See also ==
- Dance in Australia
