= Strike Back: Legacy =

- Region 2 DVD cover art
- No. of episodes: 10

Release
- Original network: Sky1; Cinemax
- Original release: 3 June – 29 July 2015

Series chronology
- ← Previous; Shadow Warfare Next → Retribution

Strike Back: Legacy, as it is known in the United Kingdom is a ten-part British action television serial, and serves as the fifth series of Strike Back. The main cast of the series includes Philip Winchester, Sullivan Stapleton, Robson Green, Michelle Lukes, Milauna Jackson and Michelle Yeoh. The series, which continues the actions of the military intelligence unit Section 20, shows the team initially working to rescue the daughter of the British Ambassador in Thailand, but later the situation escalates when the plot was orchestrated by Office 39, a North Korean crime syndicate working to goad North Korea into conflict with the West.

Production began in early 2014. Midway through, production was halted for six months when Stapleton suffered a head injury; production halted to allow Stapleton's complete recovery as the cast are required to be in peak physical condition. Filming took place across Thailand and Hungary. The series premiered on 3 June 2015 on Sky1 in the United Kingdom, and would later premiere on Cinemax in the United States on 31 July. Strike Back: Legacy received generally positive reviews from television critics. Legacy was originally marketed as the final season of the series, until it was renewed for a sixth series on 8 December 2016.

== Cast ==
Section 20

- Philip Winchester as Sergeant Michael Stonebridge, Royal Marines (former Special Boat Service)
- Sullivan Stapleton as Sergeant Damien Scott, United States Army (former Delta Force)
- Robson Green as Lieutenant Colonel Phillip Locke, British Army (former Special Air Service), the commanding officer of Section 20
- Michelle Lukes as Sergeant Julia Richmond, British Army, Chief Communications Officer for Section 20
- Milauna Jackson as Special Agent Kim Martinez, Drug Enforcement Administration (former United States Army Military Police)

Government Officials

- Tim McInnerny as Robin Foster, British Ambassador to Thailand
- James Wilby as Charles Ridley, Section 20's superior based in Whitehall
- Stephanie Vogt as Christy Bryant, a Central Intelligence Agency officer
- Tereza Srbova as Major Nina Pirogova, Russian Federal Security Service
- Christian Antidormi as Finn Scott, Damian Scott's estranged teenage son

Antagonists

- Michelle Yeoh as Mei Foster / Lieutenant Colonel Li Na, a North Korean sleeper agent working for Office 39
- Will Yun Lee as Lieutenant Colonel Kwon, a North Korean soldier and operative for Office 39
- Max Beesley as Ray McQueen, a British expatriate gangster in Bangkok
- Vithaya Pansringarm as Divisional Superintendent Changrok, a corrupt member of the Royal Thai Police
- Masa Yamaguchi as Shiro, the son of a Yakuza crime lord who overseas operations in South East Asia
- Michael McElhatton as Christopher Desmond / Oppenheimer, an Irish freelance bombmaker
- Alex Humes as Ivan Myshkin, a Russian Mafia enforcer hired by Li Na and Kwon
- Dustin Clare as Faber, a Stillwater mercenary working for the CIA and later Whitehall
- Leo Gregory as Mason, a Stillwater mercenary working for the CIA and later Whitehall
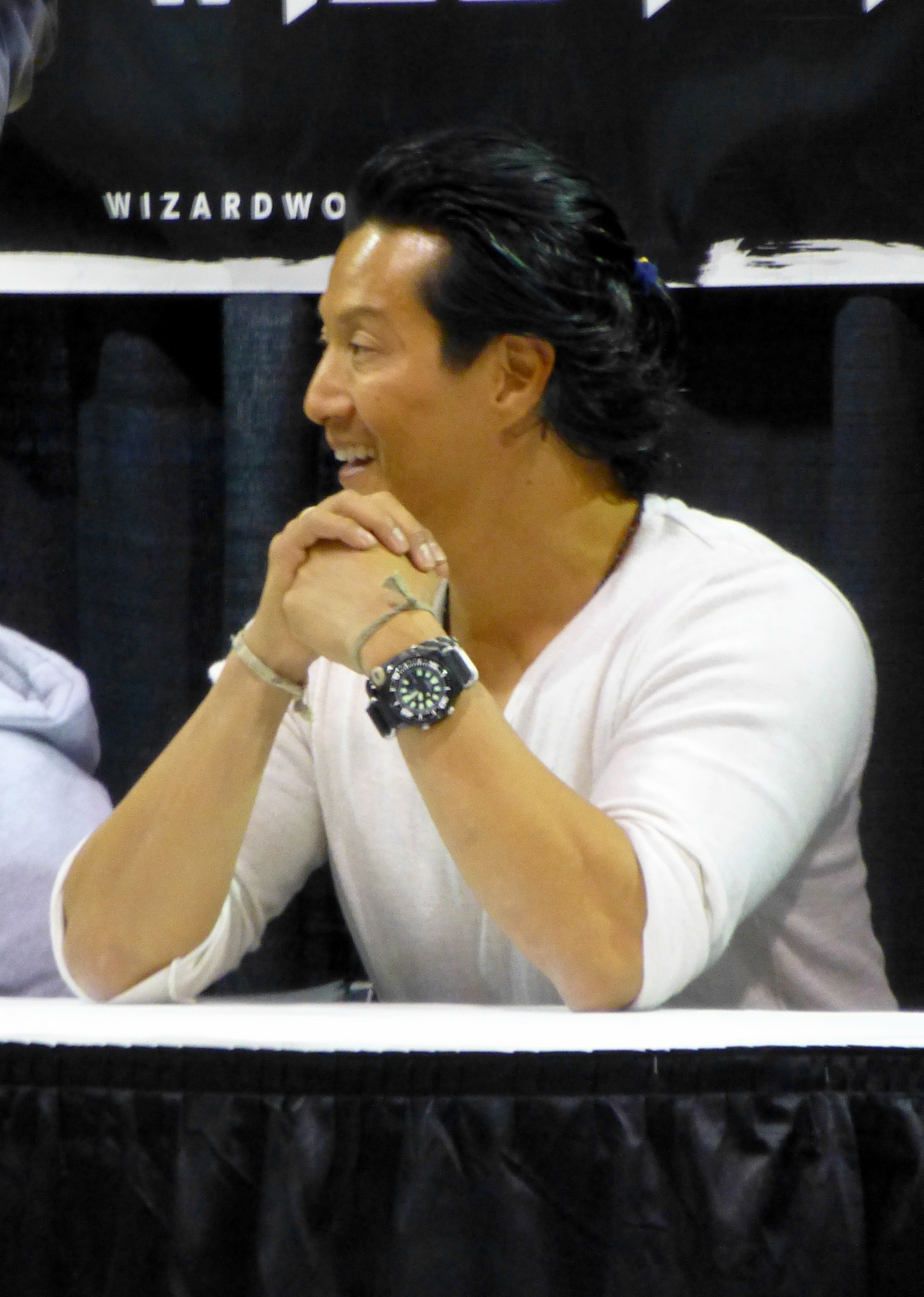
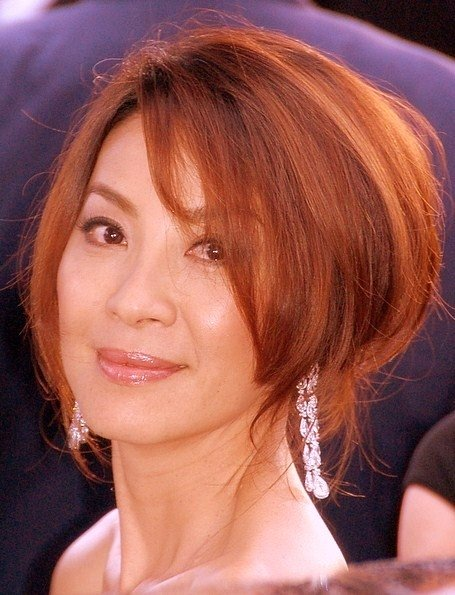
Will Yun Lee (left) and Michelle Yeoh (right) are among the guest stars of the season. Strike Back was Yeoh's first television role.

Philip Winchester and Sullivan Stapleton return as the series protagonists, the "unlikely pair of counterterrorism operatives" Sergeants Michael Stonebridge and Damien Scott, respectively. Robson Green, Michelle Lukes and Milauna Jackson also return as the main characters from the last series, playing Colonel Philip Locke, Sergeant Julia Richmond and Kim Martinez, respectively.

In September 2014, Cinemax released the names of a number of guest stars to appear in the season. Max Beesley was revealed to be playing an expatriate gangster. Tim McInnerny portrays the British Ambassador to Thailand, while Michelle Yeoh plays his wife. Strike Back is the Yeoh's first television role. Meanwhile, Will Yun Lee would appear in the series, as a villainous operative of the "North Korean State Security Department". Lee and Yeoh's participation would give what Variety's Patrick Frater described as "a significant Asian angle to the fourth season". On his Twitter account, Lee described his experience as "one of the craziest, fulfilling shows I got to fire guns, fight and cause destruction in."

Other guest stars included Dustin Clare, James Wilby, Adrian Paul, Joseph Gatt, Christian Antidormi, Michael McElhatton, Leo Gregory, Mark Griffin, Wolf Kahler, Andrew Pleavin, Eliza Bennett, Masa Yamaguchi, and British mixed martial artist Michael Bisping. Stephanie Vogt is set to reprise her role as Christy Bryant from Strike Back: Vengeance. Of the guest cast, particularly Beesley and Yeoh, head of drama for Sky Cameron Roach said "it's fantastic to have Michelle and Max join the cast of Strike Back for its final season, which will be its biggest ever."

== Episodes ==
No.	Title	Directed by	Written by	U.S. air date	U.S. viewers (millions)	U.K. air date	U.K. viewers (millions)
37	Episode 1	M. J. Bassett	M. J. Bassett & Tim Vaughan & James Dormer	31 July 2015	0.237	3 June 2015	0.989 (Note: 902,000 on Sky 1, 87,000 on Sky 1+1)
Section 20 are called into Bangkok to rescue Chloe Foster (Eliza Bennett), the kidnapped daughter of British Ambassador and longtime friend of Colonel Philip Locke (Green) Robin Foster (Tim McInnerny). The team find the compound where she is being held, but during the raid the kidnappers escape with Chloe. After identifying the lead kidnapper as expatriate gangster Ray McQueen (Max Beesley), Sergeants Michael Stonebridge (Winchester), Damien Scott (Stapleton) and Julia Richmond (Lukes) plant a tracker on him in his favourite nightclub. McQueen soon realises he is being tailed and tries to escape with Chloe again, while also contacting Foster to deliver a bomb to the embassy where he is negotiating with the North Koreans. Scott and Stonebridge have under fifteen minutes to find McQueen, who is hiding in a shanty town, while also engaging with a local gang who are working for him. They ultimately rescue Chloe and apprehend McQueen, but Locke fails to stop Foster in time, and the bomb detonates.
38	Episode 2	M. J. Bassett	M. J. Bassett & Tim Vaughan & James Dormer	7 August 2015	0.275	10 June 2015	0.718 (Note: 628,000 on Sky 1, 90,000 on Sky 1+1)
Foster survives the blast, but a North Korean general is dead. Scott and Stonebridge prepare to bring in McQueen for questioning, but he is taken into custody by corrupt police officers, who are under orders from McQueen's employer Li to execute him. Scott and Locke save him, but McQueen will not co-operate unless his wife is safe. Kim Martinez (Jackson) and Richmond pick her up before the corrupt officers can, and McQueen reveals that Li is a member of "Office 39", a covert North Korean crime syndicate; they set up the embassy bombing to goad North Korea into conflict with the West. Scott and Stonebridge infiltrate Li's compound and gather hard drives to learn more of Office 39's operation. Meanwhile, the corrupt officers attempt to seize Section 20's base. McQueen forfeits his life to allow his wife and the team to escape. The attack leads Locke to suspect an Office 39 mole from the embassy. It is revealed to the audience that the mole is Mei (Michelle Yeoh), Foster's wife, who kills Foster in the hospital.
39	Episode 3	Julian Holmes	James Dormer	14 August 2015	0.221	17 June 2015	0.609 (Note: 549,000 on Sky 1, 60,000 on Sky 1+1)
Section 20 question Luane, a secretary who they suspect is the mole. Foster's autopsy shows he was poisoned with potassium chloride after she was arrested, leading Locke to conclude that Mei was his killer. Meanwhile, Scott goes to meet with his son Finn (Christian Antidormi) for the first time when he arrives in Bangkok. Section 20's base is soon attacked by the Yakuza, under the false belief that they killed their boss. They chase Scott and Finn as well, and the two end up on the run in the jungle. The rest of Section 20 survive the attack, and Locke goes to confront Mei, who subdues him and escapes. The team learn of a car dealership run by the new boss Shiro (Masa Yamaguchi), who Mei has manipulated into killing the last boss, also his father, and from there they find his private island. The team gather intelligence and learn that the Yakuza is selling vanadium to Office 39, so they could upgrade North Korea's missile technology. Stonebridge fails to apprehend Shiro, and finds himself pinned down by heavy fire.
40	Episode 4	Julian Holmes	James Dormer	21 August 2015	0.204	24 June 2015	0.611 (Note: 539,000 on Sky 1, 72,000 on Sky 1+1)
Stonebridge is saved by two Central Intelligence Agency (CIA) operatives, Faber (Dustin Clare) and Mason (Leo Gregory), who were working undercover to rendition Shiro to the United States. Locke allows them to continue their mission if they aid Section 20 to stop the vanadium shipment in a depot the Yakuza are using as a front. When they covertly enter the depot, Mason and Faber compromise the mission to attempt to kill Shiro, as it is their actual mission. The rest of the team chase two trucks with the vanadium. After one is destroyed, the Yakuza park the second and ambush Section 20. Richmond draws out the Yakuza so Martinez can destroy the second truck. Locke learns from Shiro (before he is killed by the CIA agents) that the trucks were a diversion; the vanadium is already bound for North Korea. Furthermore, Richmond is shot and captured by Mei. Scott and Finn escape to safety on a fisherboat. Scott, now hearing of Richmond's capture, races to rescue her, but is devastated to find her dead on a dirt road.
41	Episode 5	Brendan Maher	Jack Lothian	28 August 2015	0.251	1 July 2015	0.798 (Note: 680,000 on Sky 1, 118,000 on Sky 1+1)
Scott and Stonebridge smuggle themselves into North Korea to destroy the vanadium. They meet with an MI6 contact, who hands them weapons and a map to a smelting factory in North Hamgyong Province where the vanadium is held, after which they escape a team of North Korean troops. Mei, real name Li-Na, arrives home and reunites with Kwon (Will Yun Lee), a former lover, who is assigned to ensure Li-Na reintegrates into North Korea. Li-Na orders Office 39 agents to kidnap Finn in Bangkok. As Locke and Martinez look for him, Scott and Stonebridge sneak into the smelting factory by hiding inside a local governor's car. Despite facing off against heavy resistance, Scott and Stonebridge manage to destroy the factory. As they prepare to leave North Korea, Scott learns of Finn's capture, and that Li-Na will kill him should they not surrender; Scott and Stonebridge turn themselves in.
42	Episode 6	Brendan Maher	Jack Lothian	11 September 2015	0.234	8 July 2015	0.626 (Note: 545,000 on Sky 1, 81,000 on Sky 1+1)
Scott and Stonebridge's capture attracts media attention, prompting Whitehall official Charles Ridley (James Wilby) to deny their existence, whilst ordering Locke not to rescue them. Locke disregards the order when Martinez spots hand signals from Stonebridge, leading to an exfiltration point. The two go to Vladivostok to enlist the help of Federal Security Service (FSB) agent Nina Pirogova (Tereza Srbova), who previously assisted Section 20 in Shadow Warfare. Meanwhile, Li-Na uses Finn to coerce Scott and Stonebridge to "confess" on video that their mission was sanctioned by the British and Americans to destabilise North Korea. The three break captivity and hold Li-Na hostage long enough to escape the heavily guarded compound, but Finn is wounded in the process. They are eventually rescued by Locke, Martinez and Pirogova and return to Russia where Finn receives medical treatment. Martinez leaves the team to return to her previous position in the Drug Enforcement Administration (DEA). Li-Na is about to be executed by her father for her failure when she is saved by Kwon, and the two become rogue agents. The two are later spotted in Vienna, where Section 20 learn they are planning an attack against Europe.
43	Episode 7	M. J. Bassett	Richard Zajdlic & Ed Whitmore	18 September 2015	0.166	15 July 2015	0.558 (Note: 496,000 on Sky 1, 62,000 on Sky 1+1)
In Vienna, one of Pirogova's assets Nadia Dansky (Tieva Lovelle) steals and clones the mobile phone of Ivan Myshkin (Alex Humes), a Russian mafia enforcer working with Li-Na. She meets Pirogova at an opera house, where Myshkin tracks down and kills Dansky. With the gathered intelligence, Locke discovers that Kwon will meet "Oppenheimer" (Michael McElhatton), codename for an infamous IRA bomber. Section 20 surveil the meeting, where Locke realises that "Oppenheimer" is his son's killer. "Oppenheimer" gets away while Scott captures Kwon, who refuses to divulge Li-Na's location. Scott and Stonebridge trick him into escaping so that they can follow him, but Kwon discovers the ruse and loses them. Pirogova follows Myshkin to a bank and spots Li-Na, while Kwon kidnaps the bank manager's wife to ensure they gain access to a vault. From there, Li-Na gathers a notebook from a safe deposit box. Scott and Stonebridge arrive to engage Myshkin's men, but Li-Na and Kwon escape, while Myshkin escapes with a captive Pirogova.
44	Episode 8	M. J. Bassett	Ed Whitmore & Jack Lothian	25 September 2015	0.280	22 July 2015	0.591 (Note: 513,000 on Sky 1, 78,000 on Sky 1+1)
Scott and Stonebridge continue their pursuit, rescuing Pirogova, but they lose Li-Na and Kwon when they are held up by local police. Myshkin reveals that the notebook contains codes before Pirogova leaves to hand him into the FSB. Scott and Stonebridge track down the decoder the Russians kidnapped to crack the notebook's code. When the decoder is revealed to be on Kwon's side, he escapes, and Kwon later kills him when he fulfills his use. Meanwhile, Locke uncovers an Office 39 agents working as a nuclear technician, leading the team to conclude Li-Na is having a nuclear bomb created. Scott and Stonebridge intercept the nuclear material before Kwon can. Kwon and the Russians eventually surround them, however, and steal it back. Locke confronts "Oppenheimer", who reveals that Locke was his intended target, and that it was in fact one of Locke's superiors who ordered the bombing. When "Oppenheimer" does not divulge where Li-Na is going, Locke kills him. Scott and Stonebridge discover that Li-Na and Kwon intend to attack the United Nations headquarters in Geneva.
45	Episode 9	M. J. Bassett	Jack Lothian	2 October 2015	0.196	29 July 2015	0.810 (Note: 699,000 on Sky 1, 111,000 on Sky 1+1)
Ridley disbands Section 20 and orders the team home, but the three defy orders and continue to Geneva. Scott and Stonebridge enter the building but are spotted by Office 39 agents masquerading as security guards, who aid Li-Na and Kwon to hold delegates hostage in the council chamber with the nuclear bomb. Li-Na makes a live television announcement, vilifying UN's treatment of North Korea. Scott and Stonebridge find that a secretary, Carol (Anne-Solenne Hatte), is an Office 39 agent, but the two convince her that Li-Na's mission is not sanctioned by North Korea, so Carol decides to work with them. Stonebridge pretends to be captured so he and Scott can kill the other Office 39 agents, including Kwon. Li-Na does not reveal the code to disarm the bomb, so Scott calls retired CIA bomb disposal expert Mitchell Johnson (Andrew Pleavin) and succeeds in defusing it. Section 20 take Li-Na into their custody and hand her over to a rendition team led by Faber and Mason. The team realise that they are a team of mercenaries under orders from Ridley to kill them all; Li-Na dies and Locke is mortally wounded. Scott and Stonebridge escape by helicopter, but it is damaged from gunfire and crashes soon after.
46	Episode 10	M. J. Bassett	Jack Lothian	9 October 2015	0.286	29 July 2015	0.694 (Note: 601,000 on Sky 1, 93,000 on Sky 1+1)
Scott and Stonebridge are stranded in the Alps with the mercenaries in pursuit. Scott knows that the CIA hide weapons caches across Europe, so they find a telephone at the farm of a retired Austrian soldier Oscar (Wolf Kahler) to call Christy Bryant (Stephanie Vogt), a past acquaintance from Vengeance, for the location of the nearest one, at a nearby dam. After they leave, the mercenaries come across Oscar's farm and torture him for their location. Scott and Stonebridge arrive at the dam, but the mercenaries arrive soon after. Furthermore, the cache is empty. When they are surrounded, Scott and Stonebridge destroy a part of a dam, killing some mercenaries, and jump into a river, but Scott is shot in the abdomen in the process. After fighting through more mercenaries, the two make it to a safe house with Bryant. After Scott is treated, he learns that Bryant was offered money by the team to turn them over. The mercenaries surround the safe house and kill Bryant. Scott and Stonebridge weather the initial assault, but they soon find themselves in a barn, surrounded. Faber offers to spare them if they pay him off. Instead, Stonebridge kills Faber. The remaining mercenaries attack again, and although they are out-flanked, Scott and Stonebridge fight until the screen fades out. In the next scene, Stonebridge confronts Ridley, and makes him acknowledge the dogtags of the team members killed (seen are Richmond, Locke, and Scott, though there are more than 3 delivered). After weaseling an answer that he was just following orders from Whitehall, Stonebridge threatens to kill him, and leaves. The series concludes with Stonebridge seeking out Finn on the open road, and revealing that Scott is alive and retired from service. They part ways as friends, but then Stonebridge comes back to join Scott and Finn on their way to Vegas.

== Production ==
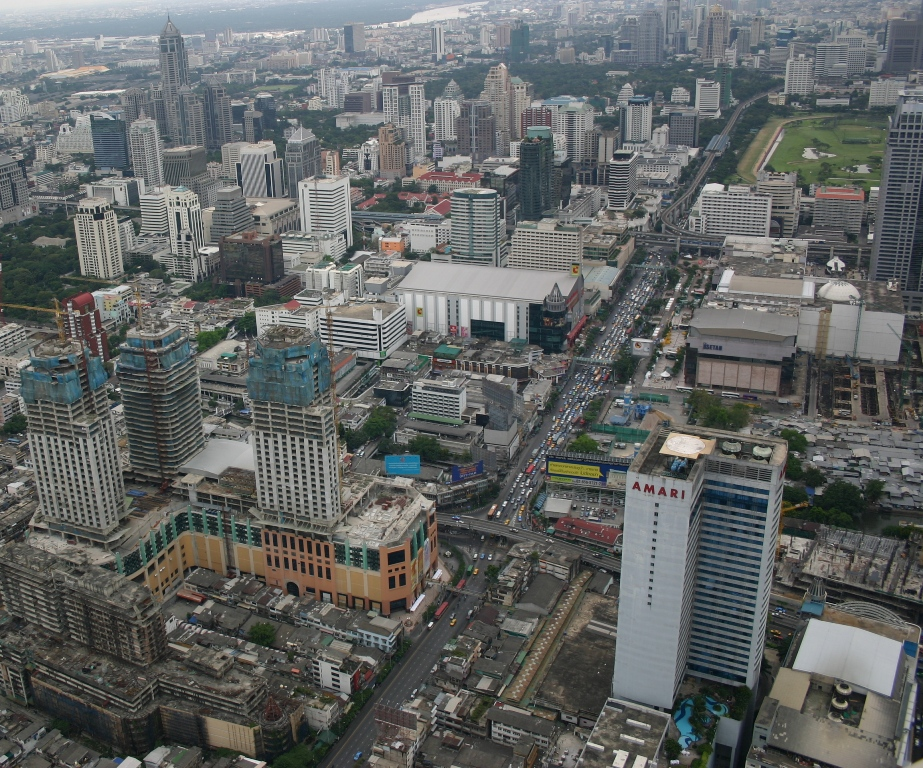
Production began in Bangkok, Thailand.

On 28 October 2013, Cinemax and Sky commissioned a ten-episode fifth series, and the fourth since Cinemax's partnership with Sky on the programme. This came with the announcement that it would also be the final series of the show. As to why Strike Back would conclude with its fifth series, Robson Green explained "you can't write a story like this, and then continue the series". The actor added; "it just got better and better and it couldn't really go anywhere else. But you should always leave your audience wanting more, and I think the finale does that. It really is a very emotional ending". Green also stated that there were talks to continue the series in some form, either on another network, on streaming media (such as Amazon Video), or produce a film, but ultimately, "towards the end, we knew it was definite that it wasn't going to go again". Producer Selwyn Roberts commented that the series would finish with "a great ending, a very American ending. When you see it, you'll know."

M. J. Bassett, Julian Holmes and Brendan Maher directed the series, while Bassett, Jack Lothian, James Dormer, Richard Zajdlic, Ed Whitmore and Tim Vaughan wrote it. The series was produced by Left Bank Pictures, with company director Andy Harries, and Sky's Cameron Roach, serving as executive producer. Michael Casey and Sharon Hughff were the series producers, while Bassett and Dormer worked as co-executive producers.

Before filming, cast members underwent intensive training sessions in order to perform stunts on the heavy action-based show. Shooting began in early 2014 in Bangkok, Thailand. According to Roberts, the crew chose to film in Thailand because "the costs are very competitive and we get a very good deal here". Filming began during the "Bangkok Shutdown", a political crisis in Thailand. Despite this, there were no filming schedule obstructions, although according to Roberts, "the only problem we had was being unable to sleep," adding that the hotel the cast and crew stayed in were blocked with political rallies "day and night until four o'clock in the morning, it was very noisy." Following the crisis, the crew found it easier to work as the military authorities were more inclined to allow them to film where and what they wanted. Outside Bangkok, filming took place in Krabi. Legacy was filmed using a variety of cameras, including Alexas, Canons, Red cameras, as well arial drones cameras. The series' visual effects were produced by Darkside Studios, having created 396 visual effects shots.

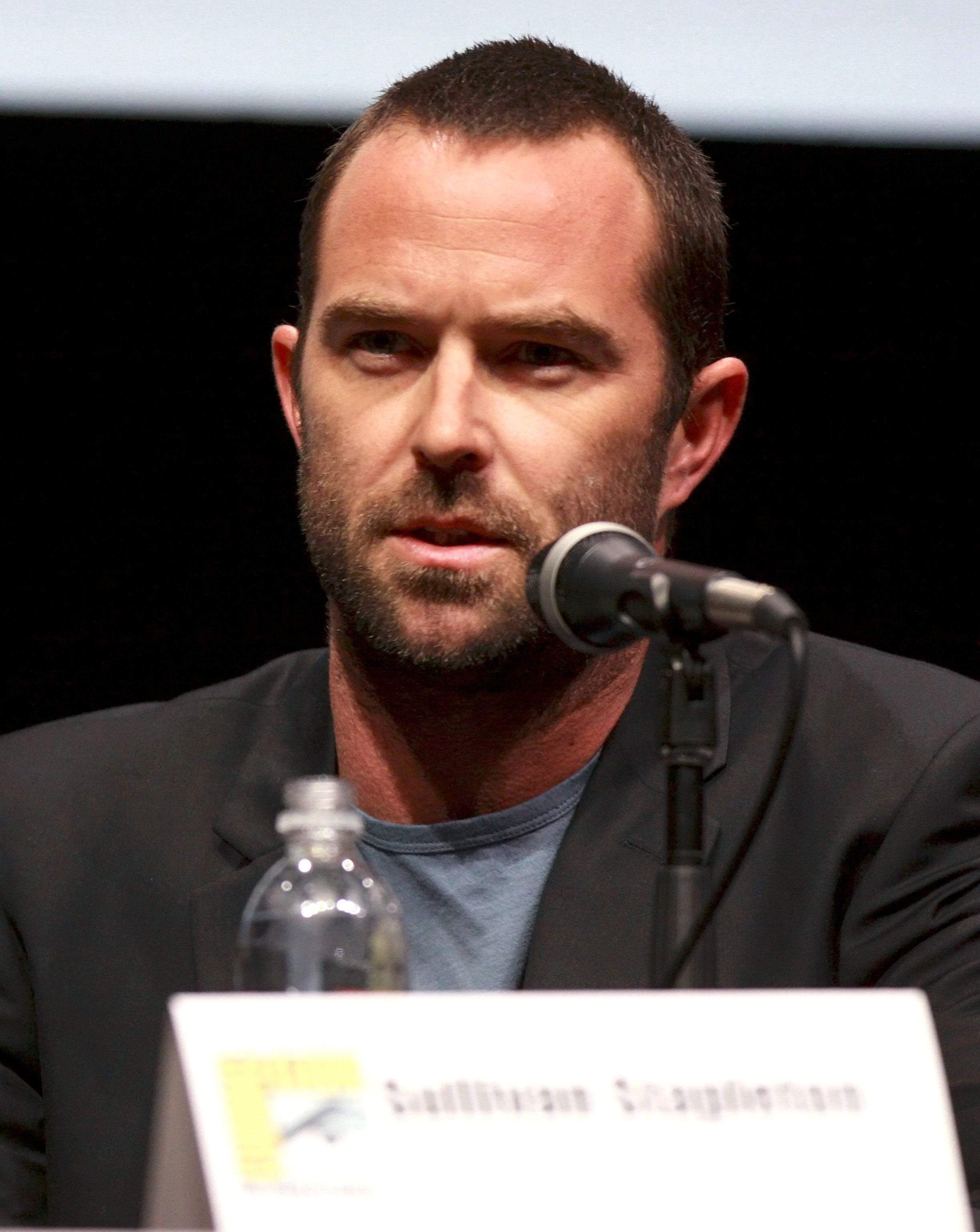
Production was halted for six months due to Sullivan Stapleton's off-set injury.

On 26 February 2014, it was reported that Sullivan Stapleton was injured while offset. At the time, the nature of the injury was undisclosed. Later, in March, it was revealed that Stapleton fell off a tuktuk, a form of public transport in Thailand, during a night out and as a result suffered a serious head injury. Beforehand, Stapleton had filmed his scenes in order to take time off to promote 300: Rise of an Empire, a film in which the actor starred in. However, he had not been able to do so since the injury. In the meantime, production continued until the principal photography in Thailand was completed. Production would later go on hiatus for six months to allow for Stapleton's complete recovery, as the cast are required to be in peak physical condition. Filming resumed in September 2014 in Hungary with additional filming returning to Thailand. The last episode of the season was primarily filmed in Slovenia.

== Reception ==
=== Broadcast ===
Strike Back: Legacy was initially scheduled for broadcast during Summer 2014, but it had to be pushed back to the next year due to Stapleton's injury. The series first began airing in the United Kingdom on the satellite channel Sky1 on Wednesday, 3 June 2015, during the 9 to 10 pm time slot, and would air every Wednesday until its two-hour finale on 29 July. Following the broadcast of the series premier, the first four episodes were released on Sky's On Demand service. According to overnight viewing figures, the first episode was seen by 424,000, representing 2.2 per cent of the television audience during its time slot. It is considered one of the higher rated broadcasts outside terrestrial channels. However, the second episode dropped to 289,000 viewers and a 1.4 per cent audience share. The final two episodes were seen by 191,000 and 143,000 and a one per cent audience share in their respective hours.

Legacy would later begin airing in the United States on the premium cable channel Cinemax on Friday, 31 July 2015, during the 10 to 11 pm timeslot. The season would continue weekly (with the exception of a week break between episodes five and six on 4 September) until its finale on 9 October. The first series was watched by 237,000 American viewers, and a 0.09 rating in the adult 18–49 demographic.

=== Critical reactions ===
"It's an action show that's always been smarter, funnier and plain better than it needs to be, with great chemistry between leads Philip Winchester and Sullivan Stapleton (both of whom will be headlining NBC dramas this fall), action sequences that put the best of network TV (including "Arrow") to shame and a winning mix of fun and genuine stakes."

— Alan Sepinwall of HitFix

The review aggregator website Rotten Tomatoes reported a 100% approval rating with an average rating of 7.7/10 based on 11 reviews. The website's consensus reads, "Strike Back's final season promises a big finish fueled by compelling characters and sensational video game-style action". Metacritic rated the series a 74 out of 100, indicating "generally favorable" reviews from 6 critics.

Gill Crawford of the Radio Times thought it "could give the likes of Jason Bourne and Ethan Hunt a run for their money", and praised the action scenes, stating that it was "breathlessly paced, with some seriously well-choreographed chase sequences through Bangkok's canals and alleyways". Greg Ellwood of Entertainment Focus stated that the season "wasted no time on making good on the promise to be bigger and better", adding "Scott and Stonebridge popping up out of the water below the enemy hideout to pursuits on jetski and dirt bikes that have you on the edge of your seat. Adam Sweeting of The Arts Desk, however, rated Legacy two stars out of five, stating that it "won't surprise anyone, but it won't disappoint its devotees either", and that it was "a slick mix of movie-like production values and infinitesimal demands on the viewer's intellect". Ultimately, Sweeting thought that "searching for meaning in Strike Back is like asking a garden shed for investment tips, but it's amusing to watch some quite good actors trying to take the script seriously".

=== Home media release ===
Strike Back: Legacy was released on DVD in the United Kingdom by media publisher 2 Entertain on 10 August 2015. It was released with an "18" British Board of Film Classification (BBFC) certificate (indicating it is unsuitable for viewers under the age of 18 years).
