= Christian Blake =

American football player (born 1996)

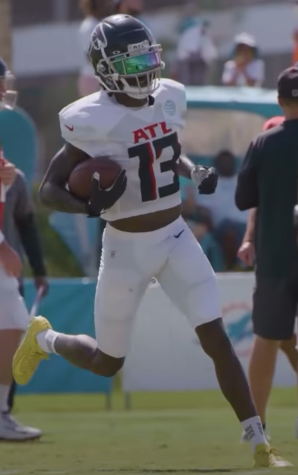
- Blake with the Atlanta Falcons in 2021

No. 13
- Position: Wide receiver

Personal information
- Born: June 8, 1996 (age 30); Plantation, Florida, U.S.
- Listed height: 6 ft 1 in (1.85 m)
- Listed weight: 181 lb (82 kg)

Career information
- High school: Cardinal Gibbons (Fort Lauderdale, Florida)
- College: Northern Illinois
- NFL draft: 2018: undrafted

Career history
- Atlanta Falcons (2018–2021); Arizona Cardinals (2022)*; Pittsburgh Steelers (2022)*
- * Offseason or practice squad member only

Career NFL statistics
- Receptions: 28
- Receiving yards: 257
- Stats at Pro Football Reference

Christian Blake (born June 8, 1996) is an American former professional football player who was a wide receiver for the Atlanta Falcons of the National Football League (NFL). He played college football for the Northern Illinois Huskies.

== Professional career ==
Pre-draft measurables
Height	Weight	Arm length	Hand span	40-yard dash	10-yard split	20-yard split	20-yard shuttle	Three-cone drill	Vertical jump	Broad jump	Bench press
6 ft 0 3/8 in (1.84 m)	179 lb (81 kg)	31 5/8 in (0.80 m)	9 3/8 in (0.24 m)	4.51 s	1.64 s	2.62 s	4.40 s	6.83 s	34.5 in (0.88 m)	10 ft 6 in (3.20 m)	9 reps
All values from Pro Day

=== Atlanta Falcons ===
Blake signed with the Atlanta Falcons as an undrafted free agent on May 1, 2018. He was waived on September 1. Blake was re-signed to the practice squad on September 10. He was released on September 26. Blake was re-signed to the practice squad on December 18. He signed a reserve/future contract with the Falcons on December 31.

On August 31, 2019, Blake was waived by the Falcons and was signed to the practice squad the next day. He was promoted to the active roster on October 23.

Blake signed a contract extension with the Falcons on March 11, 2021.

=== Arizona Cardinals ===
On May 16, 2022, Blake signed with the Arizona Cardinals. He was waived by the Cardinals on August 2.

=== Pittsburgh Steelers ===
On August 11, 2022, Blake signed with the Pittsburgh Steelers. He was released by the Steelers on August 23.
