= Strike Back: Revolution =

British-American action television series

- No. of episodes: 10

Release
- Original network: Sky One; Cinemax
- Original release: 25 January – 2 May 2019

Season chronology
- ← Previous; Retribution Next → Vendetta

Strike Back: Revolution (known as Strike Back: Silent War in the UK) is a ten-part British action television series, and serves as the seventh series of Strike Back featuring returning cast members Daniel MacPherson, Warren Brown and Alin Sumarwata. New cast members include Jamie Bamber and Yasemin Allen. The series premiered 10 January 2019 on OCS Choc in France, 25 January 2019 on Cinemax in the United States and premiered on 28 February 2019 on Sky One in the United Kingdom.

The series is set six months after the events of Retribution and sees the Section 20 team re-activated and placed under a new commander. They are sent to Malaysia to investigate a crashed Russian bomber and form an uneasy alliance with Russian FSB Alpha Group agent Katrina Zarkova to locate a missing nuclear weapon.

== Cast ==
Section 20

- Daniel MacPherson as Sergeant Samuel Wyatt, US Joint Special Operations Command
- Warren Brown as Sergeant Thomas "Mac" McAllister, British Army (ex-United Kingdom Special Forces)
- Alin Sumarwata as Lance Corporal Gracie Novin, Australian Army Special Operations Command
- Jamie Bamber as Colonel Alexander Coltrane, British Army, the new temporary commanding officer of Section 20
- Varada Sethu as Lance Corporal Manisha Chetri, British Army

Federal Security Service (FSB)

- Yasemin Allen as Captain Katrina Zarkova, FSB Alpha Group
- Alec Newman as Lieutenant Pavel Kuragin, FSB Alpha Group Support
- Marek Vasut as Colonel Beshnov, the leader and commanding officer of Alpha Group

Law Enforcement and Government Officials

- Ann Truong as Inspector Amy Leong, Royal Malaysia Police
- Adrian Edmondson as James McKitterick, British High Commissioner to Malaysia
- Victoria Smurfit as Special Agent Lauren Gillespie, United States Drug Enforcement Administration
- Naeim Ghalili as Colonel Aldo, Indonesian Special Forces Command
- Richard Dillane as Chief of General Staff Pokrovsky, Russian Armed Forces

Antagonists

- Tom Wu as Laoshu, a mercenary and enforcer for the Shun-Ko Triad
- Teik Leong Lim as Kim Wei-Fong, the leader of the Shun-Ko Triad
- Shivani Ghai as Anjali Vartak, a wealthy Indian Hindu nationalist
- Aidan McArdle as Connor Ryan, a corrupt Irish lawyer working for Vartak
- Rudi Dharmalingam as Gopan Laghari, the leader of Hindu militant organisation Shuddh Raashtr
- Chris Obi as Jean-Baptiste Zaza, a Tutsi Rwandan drug lord based in Myanmar and leader of the Punchan Cartel
- Faizal Hussein as Hassan Ahmed, the leader of Indonesian Islamic terror group Alssaff Alddina
- Marama Corlett as Natasha Petrenko, a rogue Russian Foreign Intelligence Service (SVR) officer allied with Kuragin
- Alex Waldmann as Artem Orlov, a former member of the 482nd Russian Marine Battalion allied with Kuragin
- Cecep Arif Rahman as Jericho

== Episodes ==
No. overall	No. in season	Title	Directed by	Written by	U.S. air date	U.S. viewers (millions)	U.K. air date	U.K. viewers (millions)
57	1	Episode 1	Bill Eagles	Jack Lothian	25 January 2019	0.116	28 February 2019	0.447
Six months after the events of Retribution, Mac, Wyatt and Novin remain on suspended duties on base in Nairobi, Kenya. Royal Signals Lance Corporal Zoe Davis approaches FSB Captain Katrina Zarkova in Kuala Lumpur about a potential deal, but is later killed in her apartment and her intel stolen. Section 20 are reactivated and sent to investigate under the temporary command of Colonel Alexander Coltrane. In Malaysia, they ambush and confront Zarkova's Alpha Group safehouse, although the Russians deny killing Davis. The safehouse is then ambushed by triads, and after a gunfight which kills Zarkova's team, Mac and Wyatt are arrested. While in jail at the local police precinct in Kuala Lumpur, McCalister specifies that Reynolds has taken the fall for the events of Retribution, and is now working with NGOs in Sudan. After being released by Inspector Amy Leong, Section 20 discover Zarkova's team was investigating the disappearance of a Russian supersonic bomber, from which a nuclear missile was stolen by the triads. They trace Zarkova and the triads’ operations officer to a skyscraper in the city to determine the location of the missile, but are heavily ambushed and only just able to escape via helicopter with the help of Coltrane.
58	2	Episode 2	Bill Eagles	Jack Lothian	1 February 2019	0.113	7 March 2019	0.616
After a planned STAFOC raid to obtain the warhead fails, Inspector Leong revokes Section 20's clearance to operate in Kuala Lumpur. Fearing that someone in Moscow was paid off to reveal her team's location to the triads, Zarkova forms an uneasy alliance with Section 20. After obtaining intel from Zarkova's handler, Pavel Kuragin, Coltrane discovers British High Commissioner James McKitterick is being forced to work with the triads to pay off a gambling debt. The team follows him to a meeting with the triads where he is forced to authorise a diplomatic transfer to transport the warhead out of the city. Zarkova and Wyatt are able to evacuate an injured McKitterick, but he later commits suicide. Wanting to avenge Davis, Novin disobeys orders and pursues Laoshu, engaging in a brutal fight and eventually killing him. The rest of the team and Leong pursue the warhead to the Hulu Langat District, and although they are able to arrest the leader of the triad, the warhead is transported away via helicopter. Contacting her superior, Colonel Beshnov, Zarkova indicates she intends to betray Section 20 once she has used them for their resources to locate the missile.
59	3	Episode 3	Paul Wilmshurst	Jack Lothian	8 February 2019	0.060	14 March 2019	0.631
The warhead arrives in Goa, India, where it is delivered to Anjali Vartak, a wealthy Islamophobic Hindu nationalist, who appears to want it converted into two suitcase nukes. Professor Yamal Shah, a scientist kidnapped to work on the project, escapes and is rescued by Section 20; however, owing to a mistake by newcomer Lance Corporal Manisha Chetri, he is killed by Vartak's men when the exfil is interrupted by the Holi Festival. Having been approached by Kuragin during the festival, Zarkova attempts to duplicate files from the team's computer system, but is caught by Coltrane and restrained. Novin, Wyatt and Mac attend a charity fundraiser hosted by Vartak with the intention of cloning her hard drives to discover the location of the bombs; however, the operation is interrupted by Professor Shah's daughter Samira, who attempts to avenge her father and is shot, causing Wyatt to be apprehended by security. Mac and Novin are able to escape with Connor Ryan, an Irish lawyer working for Vartak, in the hope that he can provide them with intel. Meanwhile, the Crib comes under attack, with Coltrane, Chetri and Zarkova narrowly escaping and destroying their systems. Zarkova is shot in her bulletproof vest by Gopan Langhari, a Hindu militant working for Vartak, before she can enter the escape vehicle.
60	4	Episode 4	Paul Wilmshurst	Jack Lothian	15 February 2019	0.114	21 March 2019	0.59
With Zarkova having been saved by her plate carrier, the team retreats to an MI6 safehouse to continue the mission. Wyatt is able to escape from Vartak's men, not before noticing her confusion at his mention of the suitcase nukes. Wyatt and Mac accompany Ryan to his law firm to retrieve the information, but the building is attacked by Gopan and his men and Ryan is killed. Unable to crack Ryan's hard drive, the team ambushes Kuragin and use his equipment to track down the secondary location of the suitcase nukes. Vartak confronts Gopan about building the devices, having only enlisted him to build small scale dirty bombs to detonate in mosques around the city. Gopan acknowledges that he was hired by Kingfisher to rebuild the warhead and disguise its origin. Upon discovering a national newspaper has evidence of her dealings with Gopan, Vartak desperately flees with a suicide vest and is pursued by Wyatt, who is able to stop her detonating the device in a Muslim family's house by pushing her out of a window, accidentally killing her. The rest of the team follows the nukes and engage in a firefight, but are unable to stop the transport from escaping. Chetri is able to use a drone to identify the driver as Nemo Kyaw, a Burmese national. Zarkova shoots Gopan, who reveals as he dies that he was told to spare her during the attack on the Crib, and that Russians are behind the whole ordeal.
61	5	Episode 5	Steve Shill	Jack Lothian	22 February 2019	0.090	28 March 2019	0.656
Nemo Kyaw is run off the road whilst driving through the fictional Punchan region of Myanmar (part of the Golden Triangle) and has the bombs stolen by Jean-Baptiste Zaza, a Rwandan-born drug lord and influential leader of the Punchan Cartel. The team meets with Coltrane's contact in the region, DEA Special Agent Lauren Gillespie, who provides them with intel allowing them to destroy Zaza's communication network and eavesdrop when he switches to regular channels. She also blackmails Wyatt into killing Zaza's lieutenant instead of bringing him in for questioning. Section 20 discover Zaza intends to sell the devices to Al-Shabaab, but when the group's arms broker Gabrielle Barre is accidentally killed on arrival, Novin takes her place at the deal. Novin uses Zarkova's data leaching device to try and ascertain the location of the nukes, but before the extraction is complete Zaza receives a message informing him of her true identity and a firefight breaks out. The team narrowly escape, with Novin and Zarkova getting away via Barre's seaplane. Colonel Beshnov arrives in the country and meets with Kuragin, telling him be believes Zarkova is the mysterious “Kingfisher”, and part of an ultra-nationalist plot within the FSB. He is then shot by Kuragin, who reveals it is he, not Zarkova, who is behind the plot before killing him.
62	6	Episode 6	Steve Shill	Jack Lothian	1 March 2019	0.096	4 April 2019	0.564
Having crash landed the damaged seaplane, Novin and Zarkova are captured by soldiers and taken to a local prison. Mac confronts Wyatt about him being blackmailed by Gillespie, causing Wyatt to reveal he was part of a special operations unit in Iraq that went rogue and started killing civilians, forcing him to kill his colleagues to stop it. Zaza and the corrupt prison warden agree to have Novin and Zarkova killed in a prison fight, but they end up teaming up with the inmates sent to kill them to escape the facility. The two escape with the help of Mac and Wyatt, but discover the intel has been destroyed. Chetri discovers it was Gillespie that betrayed Novin to Zaza. Confronted by Coltrane, she reveals an alliance with Zaza to gain information about other cartels in the region, having used a DEA slush fund to help finance his rise to power. After abandoning Coltrane, she is kidnapped by Kuragin and taken to where Zaza is keeping the nukes. Section 20 follows, and is able to kill Zaza and acquire the devices, although Gillespie is killed. On exit, Wyatt is shot by Kuragin who takes the devices with Zarkova, although he is eventually found by Mac and Novin. Zarkova confronts Kuragin, who admits to killing Beshnov and her team in Malaysia. Zarkova calls 'Directorate 338' in Moscow to report Pavel's crimes, but after a brief conversation she lowers her weapon and salutes Kuragin.
63	7	Episode 7	Mark Everest	Jack Lothian & Chris Cornwell	8 March 2019	0.121	11 April 2019	0.608
Wyatt returns to work, with the gunshot having missed all of his vital organs. Kuragin travels with Zarkova to Jakarta, Indonesia, where they are forced to raise their own funds by robbing a jewelry store as punishment for killing Beshnov. Chetri uncovers information on Roman Lesnitsky, an FSB analyst with information on Kuragin. Although extracting him from Saratov is forbidden by Whitehall, Coltrane tells the team it has been approved. In Russia, Lesnitsky informs Coltrane, Novin and Mac that he is the architect of the “Kingfisher” project, a response to Western economic sanctions after the annexation of Crimea. The team are attacked during the exfil and Lesnitsky flees, but tells them of a man involved named Hassan Ahmed, the recently released founder of an Indonesian Islamic terrorist group. Kuragin and Zarkova meet with Ahmed, but are followed and ambushed by Section 20. Ahmed is able to escape, but the team, Zarkova and Kuragin are arrested by Indonesian Kopassus commandos led by Colonel Aldo, who take the Russians away in separate transport. Coltrane confesses to Chetri the team has not had permission to operate since Myanmar. Novin deduces the soldiers are corrupt and plan to execute them, but they are rescued by Coltrane. Chetri tracks Ahmed alone to an abandoned shopping mall in the city, but is captured when she sees his team preparing one of the suitcase nukes.
64	8	Episode 8	Mark Everest	Jack Lothian	15 March 2019	0.127	18 April 2019	0.559
Wyatt and Novin enter the shopping mall, where they are able to obtain Hassan and the device, but are pursued by Aldo's commandos. It is revealed Hassan's device was never intended to be armed, but to be “discovered” and foiled by Aldo in order to make the current government seem weak. This would allow Aldo's faction to rise to power and lead a puppet government for the Russians, allowing them to exert international influence and circumvent economic sanctions. Coltrane and Mac meet with Army Chief of Staff General Dewanto, but are attacked by various hostiles resulting in Dewanto being injured. Chetri is revealed to have been kidnapped by Pavel, who uses her to repair a remote detonator, as he intends to go against Lesnitsky's plan and activate the device. Wyatt and Novin escape the mall; however, both Hassan and Aldo are killed, leaving no witnesses to testify to Pavel's machinations. Questioning her loyalties, Zarkova aids Novin in disarming the device when Pavel activates it, and later releases Chetri from captivity as she is no longer willing to go through with Pavel's plans. In the aftermath, Coltrane is interrogated at a black site in Moscow in order to help corroborate Zarkova's claims about Kuragin's true intentions. He and Section 20 are then asked by Zarkova and members of the Russian government to help them bring in Pavel before he causes a war between Russia and the West.
65	9	Episode 9	Bill Eagles	Jack Lothian	22 March 2019	0.100	25 April 2019	0.515
Four months later Coltrane, Zarkova, Chetri, Mac and Novin remain in pursuit of Pavel. They secure the second nuclear bomb from the Taliban in Mingora, Pakistan and learn thar an associate of Kuragin sold it for $10 million. Superiors in London and Moscow give them a deadline of ten days to capture Kuragin before support for the joint operation is pulled. They track Kuragin's associate, rogue SVR officer Natasha Petrenko, to Hong Kong. Wyatt, now working as a private bodyguard for American security tech businessman Caleb Montgomery—and secretly tracking Kuragin independently—finds himself in the same location. During a sale of software between Petrenko and Montgomery, Section 20 reunites with Wyatt and apprehends the two, but Petrenko escapes when Pavel attacks the club with an IED. The two Russians then liaise with Artem Orlov, a rogue former Russian Marine and storm a secret satellite station, using Montgomery's computer worm software to cause a Russian satellite storing missile launch keys to crash into an ISIL stronghold in the Philippines. Mac, Wyatt and Novin are able to obtain secure the keys before they can be sold by ISIL to Pavel's group, but a large gunfight erupts during their exfil. Pinned down, Coltrane helps Section 20 escape by providing covering fire, but he is disarmed and captured by Pavel, Petrenko and Orlov before he can rejoin the group.
66	10	Episode 10	Bill Eagles	Jack Lothian	29 March 2019	0.133	2 May 2019	0.504
Section 20 are able to rescue Coltrane and capture Pavel. Rendezvousing at a Russian Army base in the Philippines, Coltrane promotes Novin to Acting Sergeant and team leader as she was the only operative who did not disobey orders and try to save him. Section 20 are thanked by the Russians for their assistance, but are informed Zarkova is due to be court martialled for disobeying orders in Malaysia, and they are forbidden from questioning Kuragin or will be treated as foreign hostiles. The FSB convoy transporting Pavel and the keys is attacked by Petrenko with a UAV and Orlov leading a team of mercenaries, which allows Kuragin and Petrenko to escape. Orlov is killed in a firefight with Mac and Wyatt. Zarkova reveals the teams Russian liaison Chief of General Staff Pokrovsky is working with Kuragin, and he is killed by Coltrane. The team track Kuragin and Petrenko to a secret VX chemical weapons site in Azerbaijan, undeclared to the West after the fall of the Soviet Union. Kuragin uses the keys to target three chemical missiles at London, Paris and Berlin. He injures Zarkova and forces Novin to kill him rather than give up the override code. Wyatt kills Petrenko. With Chetri unable to cancel the launch sequence, the team uses plastic explosive to blow up the missiles in their silos and prevent the launch. They barely escape the complex as it is destroyed. Tending to an injured Zarkova, the group drives away from the destroyed facility.
