= Strike Back: Retribution =

- No. of episodes: 10

Release
- Original network: Sky One; Cinemax
- Original release: 31 October 2017 – 28 February 2018

Series chronology
- ← Previous; Legacy Next → Revolution

Strike Back: Retribution is a ten-part British action television series, and serves as the sixth series and second revamp of Strike Back, with a new cast including Daniel MacPherson, Warren Brown, Roxanne McKee and Alin Sumarwata. The series premiered on 31 October 2017 on Sky One in the United Kingdom and 2 February 2018 on Cinemax in the United States.

The series focuses on Section 20, a clandestine multinational Special Forces team. Section 20 has been re-formed after the events of Legacy and placed under new leadership. The team is tasked with locating notorious terrorist Omar Idrisi and his British wife, Jane Lowry, before they can seemingly start a terrorist attack against the West.

== Cast ==
Section 20

- Daniel MacPherson as Sergeant Samuel Wyatt, US Joint Special Operations Command
- Warren Brown as Sergeant Thomas "Mac" McAllister, British Army (former United Kingdom Special Forces)
- Roxanne McKee as Captain Natalie Reynolds, British Army (former Special Reconnaissance Regiment)
- Alin Sumarwata as Lance Corporal Gracie Novin, Australian Army Special Operations Command
- Nina Sosanya as Colonel Adeena Donovan, British Army, the commanding officer of the revived Section 20
- Phil Dunster as Lance Corporal Will Jensen, British Army Intelligence Corps

Special Guest

- Philip Winchester as Michael Stonebridge, former Special Boat Service operator and Section 20 operative, who disappeared after the events of Strike Back: Legacy.
- Sullivan Stapleton as Damien Scott, former Delta Force operator and Section 20 operative, who disappeared after the events of Strike Back: Legacy.

Military officials

- Corey Johnson as Colonel Parker, US Joint Special Operations Command
- Selva Rasalingam as General Ajeeb Farid, leader of a breakaway section of the Libyan National Army
- Attilla Árpa as Major General László, Hungarian TEK (the character previously appeared in Strike Back: Project Dawn)
- Louise Gold as Crowther, Section 20's superior based in Whitehall
- Scott Young as Director Mikhailov, Russian GRU

Antagonists

- Don Hany as Omair Idrisi, the renowned leader of a terrorist group
- Katherine Kelly as Jane Lowry, Idrisi's radicalised wife
- Trevor Eve as Morgan Ives, an international arms dealer dealing with Idrisi
- Adrian Bouchet as Johannes Krieger, the head of Octagon, a private military company owned by Ives
- Kelly Gough as Rosa Varga, the leader of Magyar Ultra, a white nationalist organisation
- Mark Strepan as Josef Varga, the younger brother of Rosa and second-in-command of Magyar Ultra
- Daniel Cerqueira as Dr. Kamil Markov, a Chechen chemical weapons scientist
- Peter Firth as Milos Borisovich, a Belarusian drug lord

== Episodes ==
| No. | Title | Directed by | Written by | U.S. air date | U.S. viewers (millions) | U.K. air date | U.K. viewers (millions) |
|---|---|---|---|---|---|---|---|
| 47 | Episode 1 | M. J. Bassett | Jack Lothian | 2 February 2018 | 0.135 | 31 October 2017 | 0.503 |
Sergeant Thomas McAllister (Brown) transfers captured terrorist Omair Idrisi when Idrisi's wife Jane Lowry organises an escape, leaving McAllister the sole survivor during the assault. Colonel Adeena Donovan recruits McAllister into the reformed Section 20 to find Idrisi again, starting by freeing U.S. Sergeant Samuel Wyatt (MacPherson) from soldiers in Libya; Wyatt was undercover to gather intelligence on an arms deal Idrisi intends to make to commit a major terrorist attack. Section 20 link the deal to Khaleed Al Haptani, a playboy prince who is believed to be funding terrorism. McAllister and Wyatt team with Gracie Novin (Sumarwata) and Captain Natalie Reynolds (McKee) to get Khaleed at a nightclub, when Idrisi's men arrive and capture the prince. Reynolds manages to place a tracker on Khaleed, leading them to a compound outside Tripoli. In the engagement, McAllister chases after Lowry, but is forced to give up his pursuit to save Khaleed and his cornered teammates.
| 48 | Episode 2 | M. J. Bassett | Jack Lothian | 9 February 2018 | 0.133 | 7 November 2017 | 0.822 |
Section 20 learn the arms dealer's identity from Khaleed: Morgan Ives. The team are sent to a local town where they find Ives' helicopter shot down after the deal was made with Idrisi. Though Ives survives, the team find themselves surrounded by insurgents, with more on the way and rescue delayed by a sandstorm. They procure a vehicle, but Ives is shot during the escape. They make their way to the same army base where Wyatt was held. Wyatt manages to convince the general to help them by appealing to the general's Bedouin culture. After Ives is treated, he reveals he sold Idrissi 50 stinger missiles, which have a tracking device on them, leading them to the Nafusa Mountains. During the raid in the compound, Lowry allows herself to be captured, only to escape from Novin and Reynolds later. The rest escape the compound before the Americans destroy the base with a "bunker buster", along with Idrissi and the missiles. Lowry is later spotted in Budapest meeting with far-right group Magyar Ultra.
| 49 | Episode 3 | Brendan Maher | Jack Lothian & James Payne & Steve Bailie | 16 February 2018 | 0.089 | 14 November 2017 | 0.754 |
In order to find out Lowry's intention, McAllister and Wyatt infiltrate the group, led by Rosa Varga and her brother Josef, by participating in Mixed martial arts fights the group use as a recruitment centre. Section 20 soon discover that Lowry is after Ilya Zaryn with Magyar Ultra's assistance. Meanwhile, Donovan and Reynolds find Lowry's hideout, but find it abandoned and with pictures of Section 20's past operatives. At some point in the mission, Rosa suspects McAllister and Wyatt are undercover, so McAllister "proves" his allegiance by stabbing Wyatt, albeit superficially. After Josef locates Zaryn to a hospital, Zaryn attempts to flee, but is caught by Rosa and Josef. McAllister blows his cover to recover Zaryn, but finds his gun is missing the firing pin. Novin arrives to see the Vargas drive away with Zaryn and McAllister.
| 50 | Episode 4 | Brendan Maher | Jack Lothian & James Payne & Steve Bailie | 23 February 2018 | 0.138 | 21 November 2017 | 0.555 |
The rest of the team track McAllister and Zaryn to a training camp in the countryside. They save McAllister from being hanged and collect Zaryn. When their transport breaks down after eluding the first wave of enemies, Josef jams all communication. Believing her brother to be increasingly unstable, Rosa wishes to tell Section 20 everything she knows about Lowry in exchange for her safety. Meanwhile, General Lázsló shuts down Section 20, forcing Donovan to work in secret. She discovers that Zaryn is in fact Karim Markov, a Russian scientist who allegedly killed his colleagues with Novichok, a nerve agent they invented. The rest of the team arrive at a building to deactivate the signal jammers and alert Donovan, who drives with Jensen to pick them up while the rest engage Magyar Ultra. In the process, Josef and Rosa are killed. After they escape, Donovan is forced to hand Markov over to General Lázsló under Whitehall's orders. However, soon after, Lowry intercepts and kills the Hungarian police officers before abducting Markov.
| 51 | Episode 5 | M. J. Bassett | Jack Lothian | 2 March 2018 | 0.112 | 28 November 2017 | 0.569 |
The team apprehend Lowry's accountant from Rosa's intelligence and then gain access to and freeze her accounts. Corporal Will Jensen (Dunster) finds that Lowry is being bank rolled by Milos Berisovich (Peter Firth), a Belarusian mob boss. Lowry visits her father-in-law in Hamburg for more money, but is forced to return empty handed. Section 20 track Berisovich's meth lab in Turov where Markov is making more Novichok and destroy it, though Berisovich escapes with Markov. Novin goes undercover to Berisovich's mother's funeral to confiscate his ledger. Though they succeed, McAllister and Wyatt are captured by Berisovich's men, and are being held with Lowry, who Berisovich still wants to make a deal with. The rest of the team rescue the men, but in response, Berisovich calls Yuri, his best henchman, to track down and kill Section 20.
| 52 | Episode 6 | Debs Paterson | Jack Lothian | 9 March 2018 | 0.093 | 31 January 2018 | 0.602 |
Section 20 track down Maya, a local Muslim woman Lowry radicalised, to a local airport. When she attempts to release the Novichok, Reynolds shoots her. The Novichok is fake, however, as Berisovich does not want an attack committed in his country. In the meantime, Yuri finds the team and attempts to kill Reynolds; she shoots him but he escapes. Jensen traces the gas' radiation background and learns that Markov's lab is in Pripyat, Ukraine. By the time Section 20 arrives, Berisovich had already called in the FSB to extract Markov and confiscate the Novichok. Yuri resurfaces to kill McAllister and Wyatt. However, they turn the tables and strangle him to death. They then manage to engage the FSB and contain the gas, but in the process Reynolds is exposed. Markov works on an antidote but is killed by the Russians before he can complete it. McAllister improvises and saves Reynolds, before Novin blows up the lab. Lowry uses the remainder of the gas to kill Berisovich for trying to betray her. She later gets a call from an acquaintance, who reveals that her husband is still alive.
| 53 | Episode 7 | Bill Eagles | Jack Lothian & Simon Allen | 16 March 2018 | 0.132 | 7 February 2018 | 0.660 |
Following the news of Idrisi's survival, Lowry tracks down Johannes Krieger, CEO of the private military company Octagon in Germany for her husband's location. Before being executed by Lowry, he only tells her the name Rachel Sheridan (Dervla Kirwan), a contractor who modifies black sites. To beat Lowry to the chase, Section 20 seek the help of her daughter Lila Hall, who refuses to cooperate. Instead, the team follow Lila to her mother's farmhouse. Rachel eventually reveals the location of the black site upon hearing of Lowry's name, and that she made back doors to all her facilities. Meanwhile, Vulkan, an MI6 informant working for Lowry sets up a dead drop for Jensen and Novin. It is revealed as a trap, however, and Jensen is captured and tortured to reveal Rachel's location before Novin rescues him. The rest of the team weather an assault on the farm by Lowry's men, who kidnap Rachel and kill Lila.
| 54 | Episode 8 | Bill Eagles | Jack Lothian & Simon Allen | 23 March 2018 | 0.145 | 14 February 2018 | 0.562 |
While Reynolds and Novin find Rachel dead, MacAllister and Wyatt sneak into the black site in Kłomino, Poland. Idrissi is released by a doctor working with Lowry. When the mercenaries operating the site discover the plot, they lock down the facility and capture Wyatt while Idrissi opens the cells belonging to other terrorists. After capturing McAllister, Idrissi attempts to use him as leverage for his freedom. However, tempers flare when the terrorists turn on each other. McAllister and Idrissi reluctantly work together to fight them. Meanwhile, Reynolds and Novin kill Vulkan, who held captive the family of Colonel Parker (Corey Johnson), Wyatt's former commanding officer; Parker was forced to working with Lowry to break Idrissi out, but with his family safe, Parker and Wyatt make their way to the facility, and together with Reynolds and Novin, secure Idrissi. Jensen returns to duty and works to find intelligence on "Operation Tenebrae", which Lowry mentioned during his capture. He eventually discovers classified pictures revealing Lowry and Donovan working together. Before he can react properly, Donovan suffocates him with a plastic bag.
| 55 | Episode 9 | M. J. Bassett | Jack Lothian | 30 March 2018 | 0.130 | 21 February 2018 | 0.516 |
Donovan is ordered by an official in Whitehall to kill the rest of her team to cover her tracks; Jensen managed to alert Novin of his discovery before his death. Meanwhile, the team in Poland are chased and ambushed by a group of mercenaries working for Ives, who confiscates Idrissi to get his hands on Atlas, a file containing British government secrets, including Lowry's dealing with Donovan. The team escape drowning and follow Ives to Pula, Croatia. Wyatt and MacAllister oversee a meeting between Ives, Idrissi and Lowry, with the intention of killing them. Wyatt kills Lowry, but the other two escape and the men are forced to flee from Ives' mercenaries. Reynolds confronts Donovan at the Pula Arena, who has men positioned to kill her and Novin. As Novin deals with them, Donovan confesses her actions to Reynolds before being executed. Novin finds herself surrounded, only to be saved by the reappearance of Damian Scott (Sullivan Stapleton) and Michael Stonebridge (Philip Winchester).
| 56 | Episode 10 | M. J. Bassett | Jack Lothian | 6 April 2018 | 0.095 | 28 February 2018 | 0.527 |
Scott and Stonebridge operate as freelance agents, also working to prevent Idrissi from acquiring Atlas. Idrissi is revealed to have allies in the Russian special forces interested in the Atlas, who kill Ives. 20 arrive at Atlas' location, a cemetery on Avet Island. After the Russians arrive soon after, 20 ambush them, where MacAllister kills Idrissi. However, the Russians escape with Atlas. In order to recover Atlas, the team work with Scott and Stonebridge and resolve to steal Russian intelligence to force an exchange. They manage to break into a GRU data building in Pančevo, Serbia to steal a server. In order to ensure the mission's success, Wyatt has to place his hand on a dead man's switch to the building's self destruct to allow Novin to confiscate a server and for McAllister and Reynolds to engage the Russians. After they leave, Wyatt makes a quick escape before the building explodes. The next morning, the team manage to set up a meeting with Russian officials to exchange intelligence. When they finish the Russian official orders his mercenaries to execute the team. However, Wyatt manages to destroy one of the cars and the team drive away. The series finishes with Wyatt, McAllister and Reynolds shooting at the pursuing cars while Novin attempts to drive the team to safety.

== Production ==
On December 8, 2016, Cinemax and Sky1 announced they had greenlit a brand new series of Strike Back with a brand new cast, no longer focusing on former stars Sullivan Stapleton and Philip Winchester. Daniel MacPherson, Alin Sumarwata, Roxanne McKee and Warren Brown have been cast to star in the new series instead.

- MacPherson as Sergeant Samuel Wyatt, a bar-room philosopher who works best alone and has no intention of being dragged into a team situation.
- Sumarwata as Lance Corporal Gracie Novin, a gear-head who is looking to make the step up. Genuine, honest to the point of bluntness, she's the heart and soul of the team.
- McKee as Captain Natalie Reynolds, who comes from a military family, excels at psychological profiles and seeking weaknesses in others, although she might be blinded to her own fault-lines.
- Brown as Sergeant Thomas “Mac” Macallister, a man of his word, affable, physically capable, and driven by a desire to avenge the team he's lost.

The new series focused on the now disavowed and disbanded Section 20 that is restored in order to track down a notorious terrorist following a brutal prison break. Tasked with covert military intelligence and high-risk operations, the resurrected unit embarks on a lethal manhunt that would uncover a vast web of interconnected criminal activity. As the team journeys across the Middle East and Europe, they uncover a deadly conspiracy which threatens to overwhelm them all and change the face of modern warfare forever.

The new series was written by Jack Lothian who also served as showrunner and executive producer with Andy Harries and Sharon Hughff for Left Bank Pictures. M. J. Bassett served as director and executive producer, Bill Shephard as producer. The new Strike Back series was filmed sometime in 2017. The new series debuted in the UK on Sky One on October 31, 2017 and in the US on Cinemax on February 2, 2018.

On February 13, 2018, it was announced that former stars Sullivan Stapleton and Philip Winchester would reprise their roles as Damien Scott and Michael Stonebridge for two special guest appearances later in the new series.
