= Jeremy Glazer =

American actor

- Born: Huntington Station, New York
- Occupation: Actor
- Years active: 1997–present

Jeremy Glazer is an American actor and voice artist. He is best known for his roles in the films Letters from Iwo Jima, Save Me, On the Ride, and Rust Creek. Glazer's performances include big-budget blockbusters and independent films, theatre, and television shows such as Modern Family, Grey's Anatomy, The Good Fight, and Animal Kingdom.

== Early life ==
Glazer was born and raised in Huntington Station, New York on Long Island, in a Jewish family alongside his older brother, Daniel Glazer, a former talent agent and now successful commercial real estate broker in New York. During his childhood summers, he competed in many athletics at a sports camp in West Virginia. He attended Walt Whitman High School, South Huntington and was elected President of his class from sophomore to senior year. He began performing in school theatre productions, competed in All-County Chorus, and played varsity tennis. His father, Roger Glazer, and mother, Evelyn Cohen, are retired high school health and physical education teachers.

Glazer attended the University of Delaware, majoring in Mass Communications and minoring in Theatre. During his summer semesters off from college, Glazer lived in Los Angeles and interned in the entertainment industry for talent agencies and production companies. He graduated from college with a bachelor's degree and moved to Los Angeles. He first worked as a production assistant at Paramount Pictures on television shows including The Trouble With Normal, Spring Break Lawyer and Men, Women & Dogs. Glazer later started acting.

== Career ==
He appeared in the film Letters from Iwo Jima, which was directed by Clint Eastwood in 2006, and Save Me in 2007. He co-produced and appeared in Good Dick, which premiered at the Sundance Film Festival in 2008. He has also appeared in Moonlight Serenade and When Do We Eat? playing a young Jack Klugman.

Glazer has made many appearances on the television shows Grey's Anatomy, Modern Family, The Fosters, CSI:NY, CSI: Crime Scene Investigation, Castle, Devious Maids, The Mentalist, Beauty & the Beast, Desperate Housewives, In Plain Sight, Veronica Mars, ER and Angel.

He won the LA Weekly Best Male Comedy Award for his leading role in Block Nine. Theatre roles include playing both Dorian Gray and James Vane in A Picture of Dorian Gray at the Boston Court Theatre in Pasadena, CA, and You Can't Take It With You at The Antaeus Theatre Company.

In 2019, Glazer stars in the movie Samir with Sprague Grayden, Michelle Lukes, and Peter Greene.

== Personal life ==
In November 2006, Greg Hernandez wrote in his column, "Out in Hollywood" in The Los Angeles Daily News that Glazer was actor Chad Allen's partner, both appearing in the film Save Me. In October 2008, AfterElton.com noted that Allen was Glazer's boyfriend. In May 2009, photojournalist Bill Wilson wrote in the San Francisco Sentinel that when Allen accepted a GLAAD Media Award, he announced that he had met Glazer, his partner, exactly 4 years earlier. Jeremy Glazer and Chad Allen are no longer partners. They were together from 2005 to 2011. They both appeared in the 2007 film Save Me.

== Filmography ==
=== TV ===
Year	Title	Role	Notes
2002	Providence	Chad	Episode: "Gotcha"
2003	7th Heaven	Howard Goodman	Episode: "The One Thing"
2004	Angel	Lawyer	Episode: "A Hole in the World"
2004	ER	Med Student David	Episode: "NICU"
2007	Veronica Mars	George	Episode: "Debasement Tapes"
2008	Numb3rs	Clayton Caswell	Episode: "Frienemies"
2008	Eli Stone	Derek	Episodes: "The Humanitarian", "Happy Birthday, Nate"
2009	Cold Case	Steve Wiegen	Episode: "Mind Games"
2009	In Plain Sight	Avi Rosenzweig / Andy Roth	Episode: "Aguna Matatala"
2010	Days of Our Lives	Jeff Shields	2 episodes
2010	How I Met Your Mother	Bruce	Episode: "The Wedding Bride"
2010	Victorious	Paul	Episode: "Stage Fighting"
2011	Castle	Nick Keller	Episode: "Law & Murder"
2011	CSI: NY	Mr. Booker	Episode: "Do or Die"
2011	Desperate Housewives	Geoffrey Mathers	Episode: "Suspicion Song"
2012	Beauty & the Beast	Michael Walters	Episode: "Saturn Returns"
2012	Bones	Ben	Episode: "The Warrior in the Wuss"
2012	CSI: Crime Scene Investigation	David Winnock	Episodes: "Homecoming", "Karma to Burn"
2012	Fetching	Chris	Episode: "Animal Attraction"
2012	The Mentalist	Steve Berman	Episode: "If It Bleeds, It Leads"
2012	The Young and the Restless	Jeremy	3 episodes
2013	Devious Maids	Zach Fowler	Episode: "Getting Out the Blood"
2015	Grey's Anatomy	Drew Hawkins	Episode: "All I Could Do Was Cry"
2016	This Isn't Working	Frank	Episode: "A Very Special Episode"
2016	These People	Josh	TV Mini-series also Producer
2018	The Fosters	Jeff Stolland	Episode: "Makeover"
2018	Modern Family	Kieran	Episode: "Torn Between Two Lovers"
2019	9-1-1	Ben Watson	Episode: “Christmas Spirit”
2019	The Good Fight	Avery Ward	Episode: “The One Inspired by Roy Cohn”
2020	Hidden Canyons	Harrison Ross	also Producer
2021	Special	Marc Miller	Episode: "I Don't Like It Like This"
2021	Animal Kingdom	Blake	Episode: "Free Ride"
2023	NCIS	Douglas Pritchard	Episode: "Second Opinion"

=== Film ===
Year	Title	Role	Notes
2005	When Do We Eat?	Young Artur	Playing Young Jack Klugman
2006	Letters from Iwo Jima	Marine Lieutenant	Dir. Clint Eastwood
2007	Girl Camp	Parishioner	25 minutes
2007	Save Me	Trey	Sundance Film Festival
2008	Good Dick	Café Patron	also Co-producer / Sundance Film Festival
2009	The Last Resort	Jeremy	
2009	Moon Lake Casino	Rex - Sailor	22 minutes
2009	Moonlight Serenade	Gary	
2013	Four Brothers. Or Three. Wait ... Three.	Jeremy	5 minutes
2014	Playing It Cool	New Guy	
2014	In The Clouds	Oliver	
2016	Salt Water	Sean aka Red Hat	
2016	My Christmas Love	Grant	Hallmark
2018	Rust Creek	Nick Katz	Netflix Top 10
2019	Samir	Daniel Hirshler	
2020	On the Ride	Scott Long	also Writer and Producer

=== Video game ===
Year	Title	Role	Notes
2016	Uncharted 4	Additional Voices	PlayStation
