= Unrequited =

Unrequited may refer to:

- Unrequited (album), an album by Loudon Wainwright III
- "Unrequited" (Law & Order: Criminal Intent episode), an episode of the TV series Law & Order: Criminal Intent
- "Unrequited" (The X-Files), an episode of the TV series The X-Files
- Unrequited (film), a 2010 film starring Michael Welch and David Keith

== See also ==
- Unrequited love
