= Clean, Shaven =

- Directed by: Lodge Kerrigan
- Written by: Lodge Kerrigan
- Produced by: Lodge Kerrigan
- Starring: Peter Greene; Alice Levitt; Megan Owen; Jennifer MacDonald
- Cinematography: Teodoro Maniaci
- Edited by: Jay Rabinowitz
- Music by: Hahn Rowe
- Distributed by: DreamWorks Pictures
- Release dates: August 28, 1993 (Telluride); October 18, 1993 (Chicago)
- Running time: 79 minutes
- Country: United States
- Language: English
- Budget: $60,000
- Box office: $26,351

Clean, Shaven is a 1993 drama film written, produced and directed by Lodge Kerrigan, in which Peter Winter (played by Peter Greene) is a man with schizophrenia desperately trying to get his daughter back from her adoptive mother. The film attempts to subjectively view schizophrenia and those who are affected by it.

At the 1993 Chicago Film Festival, the film won the Silver Hugo Award for Best First Feature. The film was screened in the Un Certain Regard section and nominated for the Caméra d'Or award at the 1994 Cannes Film Festival. Clean, Shaven was made a part of The Criterion Collection in 2006.

== Plot ==
The film begins with abstract images and sounds in the director's interpretation of schizophrenia. Peter Winter has recently been released from a mental institution and upon his release, must try to experience and understand a world that is all but foreign to him.

Beginning the search for his daughter Nicole, Peter's car is hit by a soccer ball. A young girl looks from beyond his windshield at him, and he gets out of the car. No actual images of the girl are shown after Peter exits his car, but the screams of a young girl are heard as if Peter is beating her. He carries a large orange bag into his trunk, and the audience is meant to presume that Peter killed this little girl.

Peter returns home, where sounds invade his very being, and he is never completely at rest. He believes that there is a transmitter beneath the skin on his head and he proceeds to remove it. Peter is also disturbed by mirrors, and typically covers up any mirrors that he can access.

The car that Peter drives becomes encased in newspaper, and he isolates himself from the outside world. Peter comes back home to find his mother Mrs. Winter still very disturbed about Peter's schizophrenia. She still treats Peter as a child, and does not want him to find his daughter.

Peter, through his travels, becomes wrapped up in the investigation of the murder of another young girl. Jack McNally, the detective on the case, is stymied because there is almost no evidence at the scene of the crime. Peter becomes a suspect in the case, but nothing found at the crime scene or in Peter's hotel room can link him to the murder.

That does not stop the detective from following Peter after he kidnaps his daughter from her adoptive mother. Just as Peter begins to reconcile himself with his daughter, McNally shows up, desperate to take Peter in as the murderer. Peter foolishly takes out a gun and aims it at the police officer to try to protect his daughter from McNally. McNally, believing that what he is seeing is the dead body of Peter's daughter, opens fire on Peter, killing him.

He finds the girl to be safe and fires Peter's gun in the air, so that he would not be charged for shooting a man unnecessarily. He then opens the orange bag and finds nothing but newspaper inside.

== Cast ==
- Peter Greene as Peter Winter
- Alice Levitt as Girl With Ball
- Megan Owen as Mrs. Winter
- Jennifer MacDonald as Nicole Winter
- Molly Castelloe as Melinda Frayne
- Jill Chamberlain as Teenager In Motel
- Agathe Leclerc as Murdered Girl
- Robert Albert as Jack McNally
- Roget Joly as Police Photographer
- René Beaudin as Boy On Bicycle
- J. Dixon Byrne as Dr. Michaels
- Eliot Rockett as Man On Ladder / Man In Jeep

== Production ==
Director Lodge Kerrigan said the inspiration for the film came from a friend who had schizophrenia. Kerrigan said he had always had an interest in mental illness and, tired of the way mental illness had been portrayed in the movies, wanted to approach the subject more realistically and show "the kind of anxiety [people with schizophrenia] live with on a day-to-day basis." Kerrigan spent a year researching the subject and then wrote the script in two months during the spring of 1990.

The film was shot on 16mm on a budget of $60,000. The production took place over a noncontinuous period of two years due to its piecemeal financing. Kerrigan, who is half-Canadian, shot the majority of exterior scenes in August 1990 in Miscou Island in New Brunswick. Most of the interior shots were filmed in November 1991 in New York. Shooting in New York was briefly interrupted when local police officers believed the filming of a robbery scene was real. Principal photography was completed by September 1992.

Of the film's plot and ending, Kerrigan commented, "I really tried to examine the subjective reality of someone who suffered from schizophrenia, to try to put the audience in that position to experience how I imagined the symptoms to be: auditory hallucinations, heightened paranoia, dissociative feelings, anxiety. I set it up that Peter, who suffers from schizophrenia, could be the killer, leading the audience down that path, but I withhold proof. There's no conclusive evidence that he is and if people feel that he's guilty, I hope that the picture holds them responsible for drawing that conclusion."

== Reception ==
=== Release ===
The film had its world premiere on September 5, 1993, at the Telluride Film Festival and received rave reviews. At the film's January 1994 Sundance screening, a filmgoer was said to have fainted during a graphic scene.

The film was released theatrically in the United States on one screen in Chicago on March 31, 1995, and grossed $5,900 in its opening week.

=== Critical response ===
The film has a 91% approval rating on Rotten Tomatoes based on 11 reviews.

Writing of the film's Chicago premiere, Roger Ebert awarded the film with 3 1/2 stars out of four and described it as "a harrowing, exhausting, painful film, and a very good one - a film that will not appeal to most filmgoers, but will be valued by anyone with a serious interest in schizophrenia or, for that matter, in film." Ebert called Greene's performance one of "great power and nerve" and concluded,

the movie is, more than anything else, an uncompromising experiment in creating, for the viewer, an idea of what schizophrenia is like. The writer and director, Lodge H. Kerrigan, has made a leap of imagination that is both courageous and empathetic: He doesn't see Peter from the outside, as a danger or a threat, but from the inside, as a suffering man who still retains those instincts that make us human, including love for our children. That society cannot see him with the same empathy is perhaps inevitable. Peter is the kind of man we quickly cross the street to avoid. Now we understand how much he needs to avoid us, as well.

The film has been cited as a favorite by filmmaker John Waters, who presented it as his annual selection within the 2000 Maryland Film Festival.

=== Accolades ===
Kerrigan won the award for Best First Feature at the 1993 Chicago International Film Festival. At the 1994 Sundance Film Festival, Clean, Shaven was nominated for the Grand Jury Prize. In 1995, Lodge Kerrigan won the Independent Spirit Award for Someone to Watch and was also nominated for Best First Feature.

== Home media ==
Clean, Shaven was later released on DVD on January 4, 2000. On October 17, 2006, the film was re-released on DVD by The Criterion Collection.
