= Sprague Grayden =

American actress (born 1980)

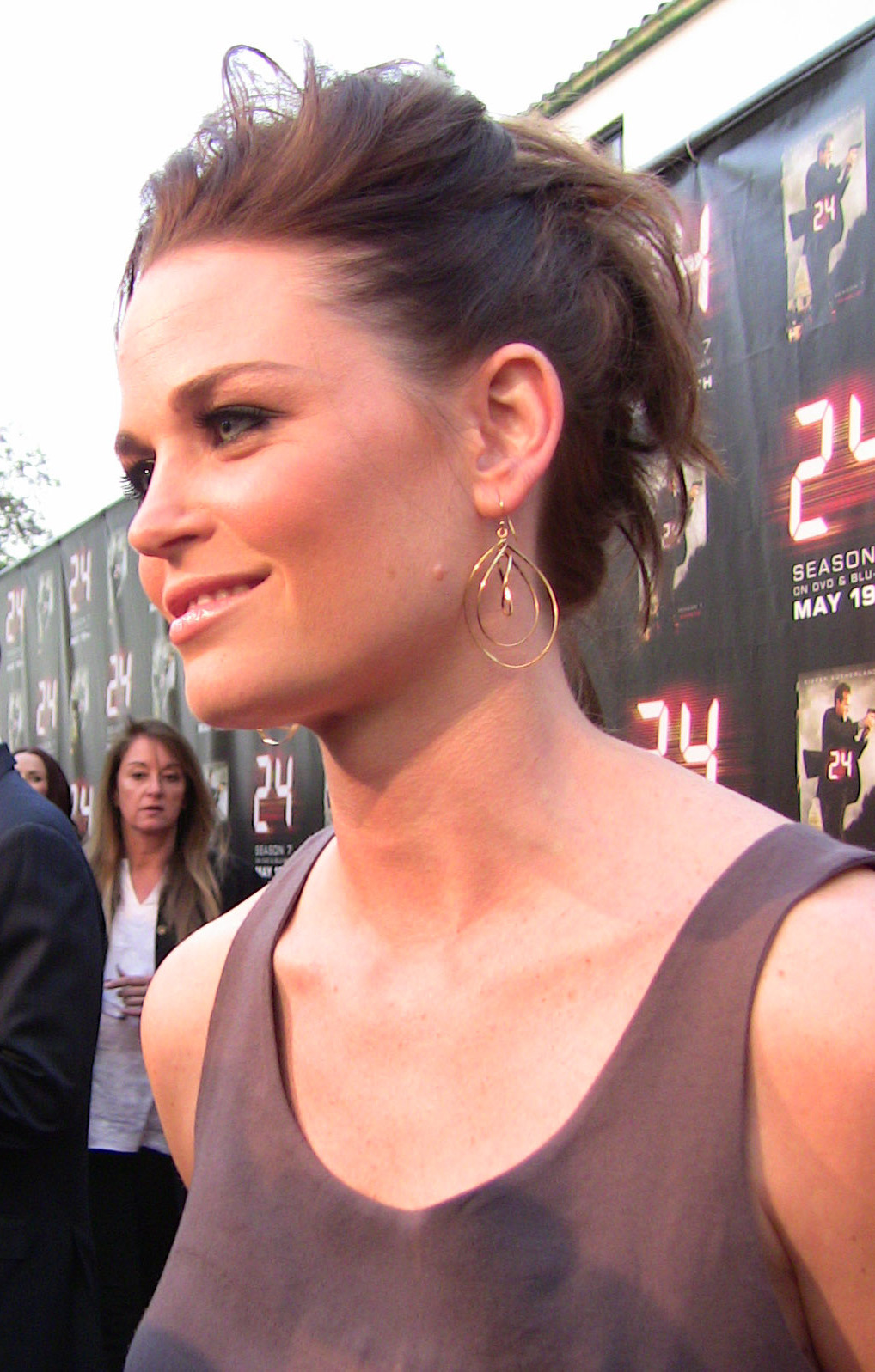
- Grayden at 24's season 7 finale screening in 2009
- Born: July 21, 1980 (age 46); Manchester-by-the-Sea, Massachusetts, U.S.
- Education: Barnard College
- Occupation: Actress
- Years active: 1989, 2001–present
- Spouse: Lex Cassar (m. 2013)
- Children: 1

Sprague Grayden (born July 21, 1980) is an American actress. She played schoolteacher Heather Lisinski in the television drama Jericho, Karen Kawalski in John Doe, first daughter Olivia Taylor in the television thriller 24, and Kristi Rey in the films Paranormal Activity 2 and 3.

== Biography ==
Grayden was born in Manchester-by-the-Sea, Massachusetts, to two schoolteachers. Sprague is her mother's maiden name. She had a younger brother, Benjamin Grayden, who died in 1999 due to injuries sustained in a fall. The actress graduated with a degree in American Studies from Barnard College, where she also performed in the drama department. In January 2013, she announced she had married her 24 co-star Alexis "Lex" Cassar. She gave birth to their son in September 2014. She describes herself as a science fiction geek and likes to collect Pez dispensers. Grayden endorsed Senator Bernie Sanders for president in the 2016 U.S. presidential election.

== Career ==
She was a performing member of the drama department at Barnard College, Columbia University. Her theater credits include productions of Hopscotch: The New York Sex Comedy, Eve Ensler's The Vagina Monologues, Sam Shepard's Fool for Love, Hamlet, Clifford Odets' Waiting for Lefty, and Ordinary Day. In 2006, she was cast as Heather Lisinski in the cult hit post-apocalypse drama Jericho. She was also cast as Donna Winston in the outlaw biker series Sons of Anarchy. In 2010 Grayden was cast as Kristi Rey in Paranormal Activity 2 and its sequel Paranormal Activity 3, while appearing in archive footage in the fourth film of the series. Grayden's other television credits include guest appearances on Crossing Jordan, One Tree Hill, CSI: NY, Private Practice, CSI: Miami, Criminal Minds, Law & Order: Los Angeles, House M.D., Grey's Anatomy, Just Add Magic, Major Crimes, and The Following.

In 2009, USA Today called her "one of TV's most interesting young actresses".

In 2019, Grayden stars in the movie Samir with Ethan Rains, Michelle Lukes, and Peter Greene.

== Filmography ==
=== Film ===
Year	Title	Role	Notes
1989	Dad	Annie Tremont (young)	
2001	Biohazardous	Laura Forman	
2006	Mini's First Time	Kayla	Main role
2008	The Last Lullaby	Jules	
2009	Wake	Marissa	
2010	Paranormal Activity 2	Kristi Rey	
2011	Paranormal Activity 3	Kristi (adult)	
2019	Samir	Autumn	
2020	Gossamer Folds	Frannie	
2021	Unknown Dimension: The Story of Paranormal Activity	Herself	Documentary film
2024	Drive Back Home	Martha	

=== Television ===
Year	Title	Role	Notes
2002, 2009	Law & Order: Special Victims Unit	Mia Kessler, Pam Galliano	Episodes: "Popular", "Liberties"
2002–2003	John Doe	Karen Kawalski	Main role
2003	Sixteen to Life	Julie	TV film
2004	Crossing Jordan	Clarissa Harrison	Episode: "Intruded"
2004–2005	Joan of Arcadia	Judith Montgomery	Recurring role (season 2)
2004–2005	Six Feet Under	Anita Miller	Recurring role (seasons 4–5); Nominated – Screen Actors Guild Award for Outstanding Performance by an Ensemble in a Drama Series
2005	One Tree Hill	Darby	Episode: "The Lonesome Road"
2005	Over There	Terry Rider	Main role
2006	CSI: NY	Jennifer Cooper	Episode: "Fare Game"
2006–2008	Jericho	Heather Lisinski	Regular role
2007	Weeds	Denise	Episodes: "The Dark Time", "Risk", "Protection"
2007	Private Practice	Susan McCullough	Episode: "In Which Sam Gets Taken for a Ride"
2008	Without a Trace	Paula Reiser	Episode: "A Dollar and a Dream"
2008	Sons of Anarchy	Donna Winston	Recurring role (season 1)
2009	CSI: Miami	Tonya Rush	Episode: "Collateral Damage"
2009	24	Olivia Taylor	Recurring role (season 7)
2010	Criminal Minds	Meg Collins	Episode: "Public Enemy"
2010	Three Rivers	Gwen Richards	Episode: "Every Breath You Take"
2010	Drop Dead Diva	Faye Newland	Episode: "A Mother's Secret"
2010	Jimmy Kimmel Live!	Kristi	Episode: "9.27"
2010	Law & Order: LA	Valerie Roberts	Episode: "Hondo Field"
2011	House	Eva	Episode: "Larger Than Life"
2011	Grey's Anatomy	Mrs. Gordon	Episode: "Unaccompanied Minor"
2011	Prime Suspect	Fionna Davey	Episode: "A Gorgeous Mosaic"
2012	Touch	Laura Davis	Episode: "Kite Strings"
2012	Major Crimes	Laura Elkins	Episode: "Cheaters Never Prosper"
2012–2013	White Collar	Ellen (younger)	Episodes: "Gloves Off", "Family Business", "In the Wind"
2013	Low Winter Sun	Maya Callis	Main role
2014	The Following	Carrie Cooke	Recurring role (season 2)
2015	True Detective	Joyce	Episode: "Church in Ruins"
2015–2016	Rosewood	Dina Katz	Episodes: "Aortic Atresia and Art Installations", "Paralytics and Priorities"
2016	Code Black	Leslie Garcia	Episode: "Love Hurts"
2016	Rush Hour	Pam Sanders	Episode: "Prisoner of Love"
2016	Pretty Little Liars	Dr. Cochran	Episode: "Exes and OMGs"
2016	Lethal Weapon	Genie Babcock	Episode: "Pilot"
2016	NCIS: New Orleans	Anne Foreman	Episode: "Suspicious Minds"
2018	Just Add Magic	Jill / Caroline	Recurring role
2018	Kevin (Probably) Saves the World	Shea	Episode: "Fishtail"
2018	Seven Seconds	Alison	TV miniseries
2018	The Last Ship	Elli	Episodes: "Air Drop", "Somos la Sangre"
2018	Station 19	Mary	Episode: "Weather the Storm"
2018	Dirty John	Tonia Sells	Episodes: "Remember It Was Me", "One Shoe"
2019	NCIS: Los Angeles	Olivia Baird	Episodes: "The Guardian", "False Flag"
2019	The Fix	Brianna Dear	Episodes: "Jeopardy!", "Making a Murderer"
2019	What Just Happened??! with Fred Savage	Sheriff Amy	Episode: "Elevator"
2020	Interrogation	Det. Carol Young	Episodes: "Carol Young & Brian Chen vs Melanie Pruitt", "Ian Lynch & Brian Chen vs Trey Carano"
2020	A Million Little Things	Lindsay Saville	Episodes: "Change of Plans", "Mothers and Daughters", "'Til Death Do Us Part"
2021	Hightown	MaryAnne	Episode: "Fresh as a Daisy"
2023	Reacher	Seaver	Episodes: "Burial," "Fly Boy"
2025	Watson	Rachel Smith	Episode: "Patient Question Mark"
2026	For All Mankind	Erin Vogel	Season 5, recurring role
