= Things I Never Told You =

- DVD cover
- Original title: Cosas que nunca te dije
- Directed by: Isabel Coixet
- Written by: Isabel Coixet
- Produced by: Coproducción España-USA; Carbo Films
- Starring: Lili Taylor; Andrew McCarthy; Peggy West; Leslie Mann; Sherilyn Lawson; Linda Ruth Goertz; Kathryn Hurd; Chanda Watts; Kathleen Edwards; Alexis Arquette; Seymour Cassel
- Edited by: Teresa Medina
- Music by: Alfonso Vilallonga
- Distributed by: Sony Pictures Classics; Wanda Films (Spain)
- Release date: 1996
- Running time: 93 minutes
- Countries: Spain; United States
- Language: English
- Box office: $850,000 (Spain)

Things I Never Told You (original title: Cosas que nunca te dije) is a 1996 Spanish-American romantic comedy-drama film directed by Isabel Coixet and starring Lili Taylor and Andrew McCarthy.

== Plot ==
The film opens with a voice-over by Don, who states that in life and relationships, "anything can happen."

Ann works at a camera shop in a small town in the Pacific Northwest of the United States. One day, she gets dumped by her boyfriend who is in Prague by phone. She makes a halfhearted suicide attempt by drinking a bottle of nail polish remover. After leaving the hospital, her psychiatrist gives her the number of a crisis help line. One evening, still distraught over being abandoned by her boyfriend, Ann calls the number and speaks with Don, who volunteers there because he finds it less depressing to talk with other depressed people about their problems than to stay at home and feel sorry for himself. They make an emotional connection, but she hangs up on him when Don admits that he doesn't really know what love is.

Ann begins making a series of emotional videos addressing her ex-boyfriend about how desolate and lonely she is. She gives the tapes to a neighbor who works at a package delivery service to send to Prague, but he secretly opens the packages and watches the tapes, becoming infatuated with Ann.

In an apparent coincidence sometime after they spoke on the phone, Don walks into the camera shop where Ann works and buys a camera for his work as a real estate agent. She makes a comment about happiness being "unfair", similar to something she said to him when she called the help line. He realizes who she is but does not say anything. Attracted to her, Don waits for her to finish work and approaches her. Ann invites him to help her do her wash at a local laundromat. They talk and she invites him to come to her house in a couple of days. When Don comes over, they have sex. Ann secretly tapes this encounter with the intention of sending the tape to her ex-boyfriend (but once again, the neighbor holds onto it and watches the tape).

After their encounter, Ann ducks Don's calls. A couple of days later, he is asked by the police to persuade a man who he had been counseling to come out of a hotel room where he has a gun. He talks to him and prevents him from killing himself but is badly injured when the gun goes off, hurting both. When Ann hears what has happened, she rushes to the hospital, staying until Don is out of danger.

Ann's ex calls to say he wants to get back together. She hastily packs and leaves town without leaving word to Don or her ex. Don goes home from the hospital and becomes a corporate real estate agent who must travel. The film ends with Don musing about what he would tell Ann if he saw her while sitting on a park bench. A woman walks by, looks at him, sits down, and smiles at him. He looks up, seeing it is Ann. Before the credits roll, we hear a voice-over of Don saying again, "Anything can happen."

== Cast ==
- Lili Taylor as Ann
- Andrew McCarthy as Don Henderson
- Peggy West as Woman With Camera
- Leslie Mann as Laurie
- Sherilyn Lawson as Ice Cream Woman
- Linda Ruth Goertz as Aurora
- Kathryn Hurd as Muriel
- Debi Mazar as Diane
- Chanda Watts as Ann's Nurse
- Kathleen Edwards as Dr. Lewis
- Alexis Arquette as Paul
- Seymour Cassel as Frank
- Karen Johnson Miller as Wife

== Production ==
Principal photography took place in St Helens, Oregon.

== Reception ==
The film has won 8 awards:

- ADIRCAE Award for best director, Isabel Coixet
- CEC Award for Best Screenplay Original, Isabel Coixet
- Fotogramas de Plata for best film, Isabel Coixet
- Sant Jordi Award for Best Spanish film, Isabel Coixet
- Silver Alexander award for Isabel Coixet
- National Cinematography Prize, Isabel Coixet
