= Killer Drag Queens on Dope =

2003 film

- Directed by: Lazar Saric
- Written by: Lazar Saric
- Produced by: Lazar Saric; Alexis Arquette
- Starring: Eva Destruction
- Cinematography: Daron Keet
- Edited by: Kosta Saric
- Music by: Thomas Dowrie
- Distributed by: Laguna Productions
- Release date: February 17, 2003
- Running time: 83 minutes
- Country: United States
- Language: English
- Budget: $25,000

Killer Drag Queens on Dope is a 2003 low budget comedy written, produced, and directed by Lazar Saric. The film stars Alexis Arquette (also known as Eva Destruction) and Omar Alexis as two drugged up drag queens who work as contract killers.

== Cast ==
- Eva Destruction as Ginger
- Omar Alexis as Coco
- Clark Weaver as Roy
- Macky Beltzkovsky as Anthony
- Mario Diaz as Bobby
- Don Edmonds as Uncle A
- Don Lucas as Richie
- Haji as Moonji
- Lawrence Hilton-Jacobs as Mr. Fly
