= Justine Miceli =

American actress

- Born: April 30, 1959 (age 67); Sunnyside, Queens, New York, U.S.
- Occupation: Actress
- Years active: 1976–2007
- Known for: NYPD Blue

Justine Miceli (born April 30, 1959) is a retired American actress, known for her role as Det. Adrienne Lesniak in the ABC police drama series, NYPD Blue.

== Life and career ==
Miceli was born in Sunnyside, Queens, New York. Miceli studied acting at the American Academy of Dramatic Arts. Early in her career, she acted in television commercials, off-Broadway shows, and traveled with touring theater companies.

Miceli appeared on daytime television and some prime-time series. Miceli's big break came in 1994, when she was added to the cast of NYPD Blue, a prime-time series on ABC. From 1994 to 1996, she played detective Adrienne Lesniak. Miceli left the series in 1996, along with Gail O'Grady and Sharon Lawrence. Since leaving NYPD Blue, Miceli guest starred on The X-Files, Seinfeld, New York Undercover, The Pretender, The Sopranos, Sliders, Judging Amy and Strong Medicine. She also co-starred in the biographical drama film Dangerous Beauty (1998), and starred in the crime drama film, Gentleman B. (2002).

In the late 1990s, while still seeking acting roles, Miceli began working as a home organizer, including in an executive position in a professional association for that industry. Since her last on-screen role in 2002, Miceli has moved away from acting and is the full-time owner/operator of an organization business based in Santa Monica, California.

== Filmography ==
Year	Title	Role	Notes
1992	Law & Order	Lorraine Schwab / Mailroom Clerk	2 episodes
1992-1993	As the World Turns	Dr. Marsha McKay	Series regular
1994-1996	NYPD Blue	Det. Adrienne Lesniak	Series regular, 35 episodes Nominated - Screen Actors Guild Award for Outstanding Performance by an Ensemble in a Drama Series (1995-1996)
1997	The X Files	Ariel Weiss	Episode: "Kaddish"
1997	Seinfeld	Nina	Episode: "The Betrayal"
1998	New York Undercover	Julie	Episode: "Mob Street"
1998	Dangerous Beauty	Elena Franco	
1998	The Pretender	Diane Post	Episode: "Crash"
1999	Carlo's Wake	Gina Ryan	
1999	The Sopranos	Nursing Home Director	Episode: "Pilot"
2000	Judging Amy	Ms. Bowes	Episode: "Unnecessary Roughness"
2000-2001	The Huntress	Anita Temple	4 episodes
2001	The Guardian	Rachel Shell	Episode: "Paternity"
2002	Strong Medicine	Annie Dantona	Episode: "Shock"
2002	Whacked!	Mrs. Stewart	
2003	Gentleman B.	Maria DeRazio	Also associate producer
2005	True Crime: New York City	Voice	

== Awards and nominations ==
Year	Award	Category	Nominated work	Result
1996	2nd Screen Actors Guild Awards	Screen Actors Guild Award for Outstanding Performance by an Ensemble in a Drama Series	NYPD Blue	Nominated
1997	3rd Screen Actors Guild Awards	Screen Actors Guild Award for Outstanding Performance by an Ensemble in a Drama Series	NYPD Blue	Nominated
