= Samir (film) =

2019 film

Samir is a 2019 drama / crime and thriller film about a real estate agent who is framed for a crime he didn't commit and is sent to prison for thirteen years. After he served his sentence in prison, he does everything in his power to get even with the people who have destroyed his life.

== Plot ==
A real estate agent named Samir (Ethan Rains) gets setup by his colleagues and decides to take matters into his own hands by giving them what they deserve with a taste of revenge and pain.

== Cast ==
Actor	Role
Ethan Rains	Samir
Sprague Grayden	Autumn
Michelle Lukes	Mercedes
Mary Apick	Zahra
Jeremy Glazer	Daniel
Max Decker	Victor
Peter Greene	Valentine
Logan Arevalo	Michael
Kelvin Han Yee	Frank
Tyrone Evans Clark	Brian
Corbin Reid	Leila
Robert A Ford	Marlon
Sam Sako	Salim Khan
Christopher Kriesa	Gary
Virgo Phillips	Meredith
Kondwani Phiri	Guantanamo Bay Soldier
Marie Bogacz	Nurse Sophie
Thomas Hautaniemi	Soldier
James Killebrew	Peter
Mark Krenik	Joey
Suzshi Lang	Carrie "Coffee Shop Carrie"
Brandon Garic Notch	Soldier
Elester Latham	Elderly Patient

== Production ==
=== Crew ===
- Directed by Chateau Bezerra (also known as Chateaubriand Bezerra), Julia Kennedy, Sarah Gross, Michael Basha, Reeyaz Habib, Sadé Clacken Joseph, Maria De Sanctis, Christina YR Lim, and Sohil Vaidya.
- Written by Michael Basha, Mallika Dhaliwal, Jennifer Frazin, Adva Reichman and Ariel Sobel
- Produced by Miriam Arghandiwal and David Liu.
- Cinematography by Ante Cheng.

=== Development ===
- This is a USC Originals film, and it was created with the help from Warner Bros. Entertainment.

== Release ==
On October 18, 2019, the film was released to the public.

== Accolades ==
Samir is an official selection for the 2019 Heartland International Film Festival.
