= Michelle Lukes =

English actress (born 1984)

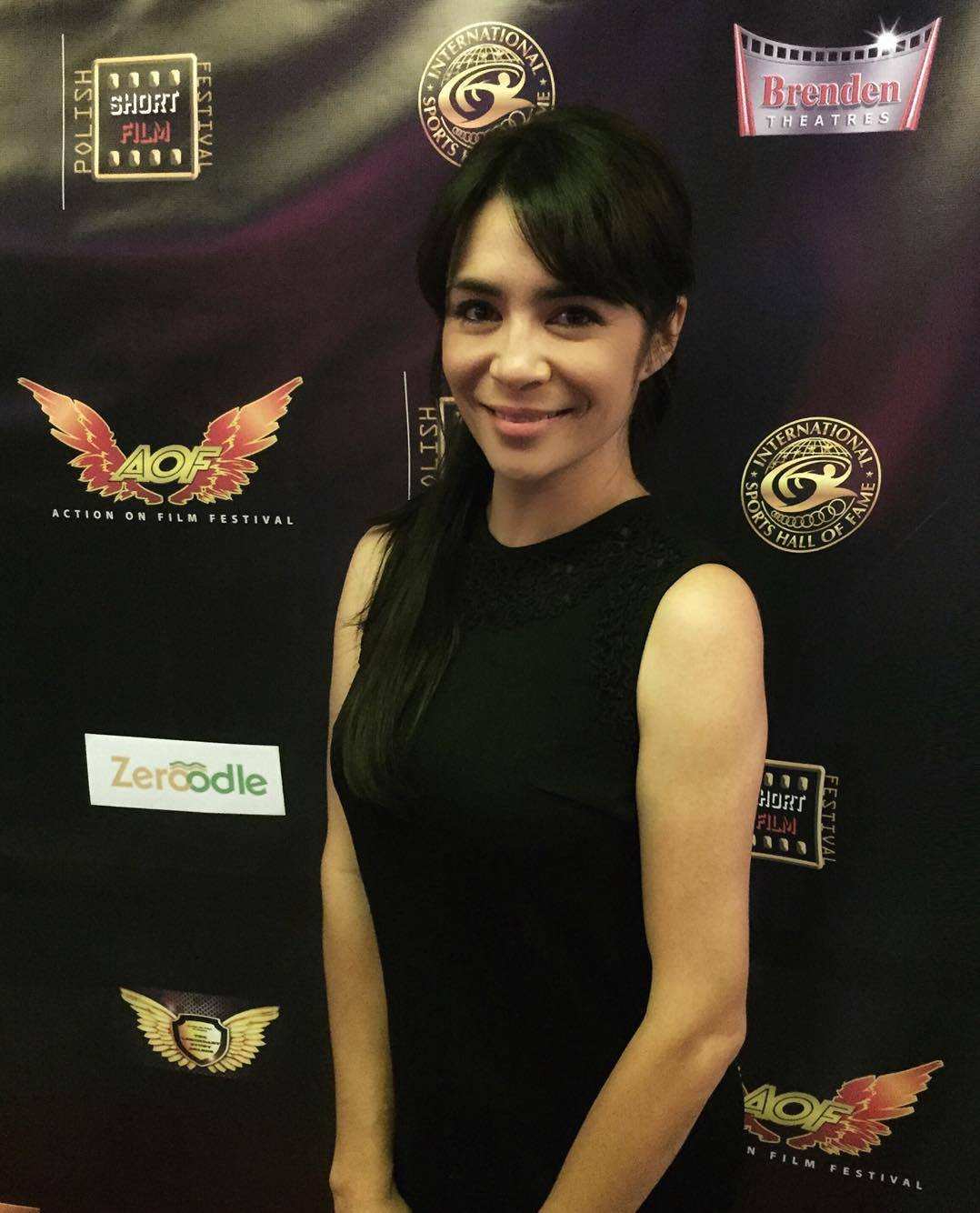
- Michelle Lukes at Action on Film Festival in 2017
- Born: 24 February 1984 (age 41); London, England
- Occupation(s): Actress, Model, Dancer, Musician
- Years active: 2003 - Present

Michelle Lukes (born 24 February 1984) is an English actress. She trained at the prestigious Bristol Old Vic Theatre School and graduated winning the Newton Blick Award for versatility. Lukes is best known for playing series regular Sgt Julia Richmond in the Cinemax show Strike Back, Lisa Torres in the BBC drama Doctors, Mother Miranda in Resident Evil Village, and Kelly - 087 in Halo 5: Guardians and The Fall of Reach for Netflix. In 2017 Lukes won the Maverick Award at the Action on Film International Film Festival for her contribution to television. Alongside her numerous other film and television appearances, Lukes has taken on stage roles for the Royal National Theatre, Royal Shakespeare Company and the Bristol Old Vic.

Lukes is also an accomplished singer, dancer and musician and spent several years in London's West End Theatre performing leading roles in musicals such as Chicago (musical), Cats (musical), Disney's The Lion King (musical), Starlight Express, Fosse and Joseph and the Amazing Technicolor Dreamcoat. In 2004 she was hand-picked to be the on-set Dance Supervisor for Oliver Stone's Alexander, in which she also appeared.

In 2019, Lukes stars in the movie Samir with Sprague Grayden, Ethan Rains, and Peter Greene.

== Selected works ==
=== Television ===
Year	Film	Role	Notes
2006	Uncle Max	Eva	(1Episode)
2008	Casualty	Polly Denver	(Season 22, Episode 30)
2009 - 2011	Doctors	Lisa Torres	(29 Episodes)
2011	Strike Back: Project Dawn	Sgt. Julia Richmond	(10 Episodes)
2012	Strike Back: Vengeance	Sgt. Julia Richmond	(10 Episodes)
2013	Strike Back: Shadow Warfare	Sgt. Julia Richmond	(10 Episodes)
2015	Strike Back: Legacy	Sgt. Julia Richmond	(4 Episodes)
2015	The Fall of Reach	Kelly (Adult)	(3 Episodes)
2018	Entanglement	Evie	Pilot Episode
2018	The World Untold	Reporter/Host	Pilot Episode
2020	All the Way to the Top	Edie Lawson	(3 Episodes)
2025	Leviathan	Dr. Nora Barlow	Voice

=== Film ===
Year	Film	Role	Notes
2004	Alexander (2004 film)	Roxanne's Handmaiden	Feature
2010	Nation (novel)	Ensemble	NT Live
2014	Francis McGee is not for Sale	Jennifer Freeman	Short
2016	A New York Christmas	Kate Ashfield	Feature
2017	The Lost Legion	Urbina Prima	Feature
2017	Nowhere Band	Sheila	Short
2017	Fake Empire	Sadie-Lou Hamilton	Feature
2017	Deserted	Carmen	Short
2018	Go Back to China	Fashion Executive	Feature
2019	Samir	Mercedes	Feature

=== Video games ===
Year	Videogame	Role	Notes
2015	Halo 5: Guardians	Spartan Kelly-087	Microsoft
2016	Masquerada: Songs and Shadows	Tiziana de Felici	PlayStation 4
2017	Fire Escape	Jackie Amato	Google Daydream
2021	Resident Evil Village	Mother Miranda	Cross-platform

=== Theatre ===
Year	Film	Role	Venue
2003	Beauty and the Beast	US Marie Claire	Royal Shakespeare Company
2004	A Funny Thing Happened on the Way to the Forum	Vibrata	Royal National Theatre
2005	The Seagull	Ensemble	Bristol Old Vic
2006	Much Ado About Nothing	Hero	Royal Shakespeare Company
2006	The Wind in the Willows	Mole	Redgrave Theatre
2007	A Midsummer Night's Dream	Titania	Bristol Old Vic
2007	Abortive	Roz	Alma Tavern Theatre
2007	Othello	Bianca	Salisbury Playhouse
2010	Nation	US Cahle	Royal National Theatre
2010	Pitching In	Elle	Latitude Festival
2015	The Book	One Woman Piece	Word Theatre
2016	All the Way to the Top	Edie	Stella Adler Theatre

== Awards ==
In 2017 Michelle Lukes was awarded The Maverick Award at the Action on Film International Film Festival for her work on Strike Back.
