= Alexis Arquette =

American actress (1969–2016)

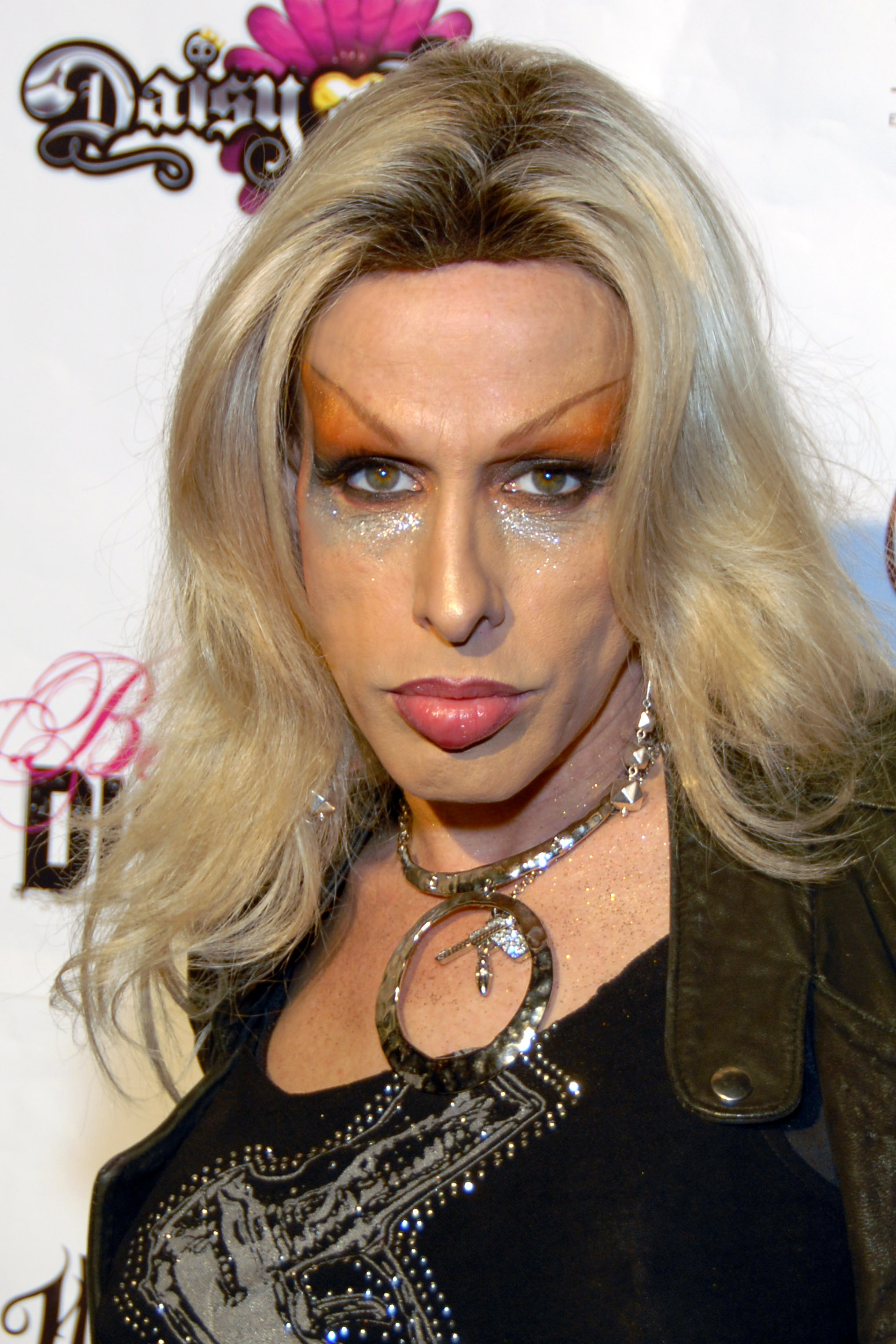
- Arquette in 2009
- Born: July 28, 1969; Los Angeles, California, U.S.
- Died: September 11, 2016 (aged 47); Los Angeles, California, U.S.
- Other name: Eva Destruction
- Occupation: Actress
- Years active: 1982–2014
- Father: Lewis Arquette
- Relatives: Rosanna Arquette (sister); Patricia Arquette (sister); David Arquette (brother); Cliff Arquette (grandfather)

Alexis Arquette (/ɑːrˈkɛt/ ar-KET; July 28, 1969 – September 11, 2016) was an American actress and transgender activist. Born in Los Angeles, she was the fourth of five children of actor and director Lewis Arquette and Brenda Olivia "Mardi" (née Nowak), an actress. Her siblings include actors Rosanna, Richmond, Patricia, and David Arquette.

Arquette began her career at age 12, appearing in the music video "She's a Beauty" by The Tubes (1982), and made her screen debut in Down and Out in Beverly Hills (1986). In the earlier part of her career she frequently performed as a female impersonator under the name "Eva Destruction". She later publicly shared her transition process toward gender-affirming surgery. Her filmography spans more than 40 films, ranging from leading roles in independent productions such as Jumpin' at the Boneyard (1992), Things I Never Told You (1996), and I Think I Do (1997), to supporting parts in mainstream releases including Threesome, Pulp Fiction (both 1994), The Wedding Singer, Bride of Chucky (both 1998), She's All That (1999), and Blended (2014).

A vocal advocate for the transgender community, Arquette's transition was documented in the film Alexis Arquette: She's My Brother (2007). She contracted HIV in 1987 and continued working in film and television until 2014. She died on September 11, 2016, at the age of 47.

== Early life ==
Arquette was born on July 28, 1969, in Los Angeles, California, the fourth of five children of Lewis Arquette, an actor and director, and Brenda Olivia "Mardi" (née Nowak), a Jewish actress, poet, theater operator, activist, acting teacher, and therapist. Lewis's family surname was originally "Arcouet"; his father, Alexis' grandfather, was comedian Cliff Arquette, who performed under the stage name Charley Weaver. Arquette was distantly related to American explorer Meriwether Lewis. Her siblings are actors Rosanna, Richmond, Patricia, and David Arquette.

== Career ==
=== Early work ===
In 1982, at the age of 12, Arquette made her first screen appearance in the music video "She's a Beauty" by The Tubes. The narrative video takes place in a carnival, and Arquette described the role as "this little kid who's on a ride with all these women and whatnot". In 1986, she made her big-screen debut in an uncredited role as Alexis, the androgynous friend and bandmate of sexually ambivalent teenager Max Whiteman (Evan Richards) in Down and Out in Beverly Hills.

In the earlier years of her career, Arquette primarily performed as a female impersonator, frequently under the name "Eva Destruction". At 19, she played trans sex worker Georgette in the screen adaptation of Last Exit to Brooklyn (1989).

=== Film career ===
The majority of Arquette's film work was in low-budget or independent films. In total, she starred in more than 40 movies. Notable roles include a crack addict opposite Tim Roth in Jumpin' at the Boneyard (1992), a teenage boy seeking revenge for a traumatic childhood in the New Zealand-shot horror fantasy Jack Be Nimble (1993), and a murderous drag queen in the low-budget comedy Killer Drag Queens on Dope (2003). Her other film credits include Children of the Corn V: Fields of Terror and Sometimes They Come Back... Again (both 1996) and I Think I Do (1997).

Arquette had supporting roles in Pulp Fiction, Threesome (both 1994), and Bride of Chucky (1998). She played Boy George fanatic George Stitzer in the Adam Sandler–Drew Barrymore comedy The Wedding Singer (1998), singing "Do You Really Want to Hurt Me" repeatedly throughout. A later role as Georgina, a Boy George impersonator, in the Sandler–Barrymore film Blended (2014) served as a callback to that earlier character.

=== Television ===
In 2001, Arquette returned to New Zealand to portray Roman emperor Caligula in two episodes of Xena: Warrior Princess. That same year she guest starred in the Friends episode "The One with Chandler's Dad", in which she appeared alongside her sister-in-law Courteney Cox, and made a cameo in Son of the Beach.

In September 2005, VH1 announced Arquette as one of the celebrity house guests on the sixth season of The Surreal Life. On January 31, 2007, she appeared as a featured celebrity client and guest judge on the premiere episode of Bravo's reality series Top Design.

=== Other work ===
Arquette made a cameo appearance in the music video for Robbie Williams' song "She's Madonna". She later publicly announced that she had begun the process leading to sex reassignment surgery.

== Personal life ==
=== Gender identity and transition ===
In 2004, Arquette expressed an interest in undergoing gender-transitioning medical treatment. She decided against hormone therapy and kept private whether she ultimately underwent gender-affirming surgery, completing her transition in 2006. Her experience was documented in the film Alexis Arquette: She's My Brother, which debuted at the 2007 Tribeca Film Festival. Arquette was a vocal supporter of other transgender people, including Chaz Bono, who transitioned shortly after Arquette.

Amid increasing health complications from HIV, Arquette began presenting again as a man in 2013. Her brother David Arquette said that Alexis was "gender suspicious" and alternately felt like a man or a woman at different times.

=== Health ===
Arquette contracted HIV in 1987. In later life she suffered from ill health as a result of being HIV-positive.

== Death ==
Arquette was placed in a medically induced coma and died on September 11, 2016, at 12:32 AM, surrounded by close family, at the age of 47. She was serenaded with David Bowie's "Starman". The official cause of death was cardiac arrest caused by myocarditis stemming from HIV.

== Filmography ==
=== Film ===
Year	Title	Role	Notes
1986	Down and Out in Beverly Hills	Alexis	Uncredited
1989	Last Exit to Brooklyn	Georgette	
1990	High Score	Yago / Freddie	
1990	Terminal Bliss	Craig Murphy	
1990	Death of a Schoolboy	Milan	
1992	Jumpin' at the Boneyard	Dan	
1992	Buffy the Vampire Slayer	Vampire DJ	
1992	Of Mice and Men	Whitt	
1992	Miracle Beach	Lars	
1993	Ghost Brigade	Cpl. Dawson	
1993	Grief	Bill	
1993	Jack Be Nimble	Jack	
1994	Threesome	Dick	
1994	Pulp Fiction	Fourth Man	
1994	Don't Do It	David	
1995	Frisk	Punk (victim #3)	
1995	White Man's Burden	Panhandler	
1995	Paradise Framed		
1995	Frank & Jesse	Charlie Ford	
1995	Days of the Pentecost	Mechanic	
1996	Things I Never Told You	Paul	
1996	Sometimes They Come Back... Again	Tony Reno	Video
1996	Never Met Picasso	Andrew Magnus	
1996	Scream, Teen, Scream	Lisa Marie	Short film
1996	Wigstock: The Movie	Herself	
1997	Inside Out	Adam	Short film
1997	Goodbye America	Paul Bladon	
1997	I Think I Do	Bob	
1997	Close To	Deaf Mute	Short film
1997	Kiss & Tell	Amerod Burkowitz	
1998	The Wedding Singer	George Stitzer	
1998	Cleopatra's Second Husband	Alex	
1998	Love Kills	James	
1998	Children of the Corn V: Fields of Terror	Greg	Video
1998	Bride of Chucky	Damien	
1998	Fool's Gold	Mark	
1998	The Thin Pink Line	Mr. Ed	
1999	She's All That	Mitch	
1999	Out in Fifty	Kim	
1999	Clubland	Steven	
2000	Piccadilly Pickups	Henri de la Plus Ooh Arrgh	
2000	The Price of Air	Willy	
2000	Boys Life 3	Adam	(segment "Inside Out")
2001	Perfect Lover	Onix	
2001	Audit	Richard	Short film
2001	Tomorrow by Midnight	Sidney	
2002	The Trip	Michael	
2002	Spun	Moustache Cop	
2003	Killer Drag Queens on Dope	Ginger	Credited as Eva Destruction
2003	The Movie Hero	Strange, Yet Attractive Woman	
2003	Wasabi Tuna	Champagne Anna	
2005	Lords of Dogtown	Tranny	
2006	Husky 2: Together Again	Gloria Robinson	
2010	Hard Breakers	Ms. Independence	
2010	Here & Now	Ramona	
2011	Getting Back to Zero	Judy	
2013	Tranzloco	Alexis	
2014	Blended	Georgina	
2014	Playing the Straight Man	Alexis	Short film

=== Television ===
Year	Title	Role	Notes
1989	Alien Nation	John Barrymore	Episode: "Contact"
1991	American Playhouse	Werner Hauser	Episode: "The Hollow Boy"
1994	Lies of the Heart: The Story of Laurie Kellogg	Denver McDowell	TV film
1995	Dead Weekend	McHacker	TV film
1995	Roseanne		Episode: "December Bride"
1999	The Strip	Cleo	Episodes: "Games Without Frontiers", "Send Me an Angel", "Even Better Than the Real Thing"
1999–2000	Beggars and Choosers	Larry / Lola	TV series
2000	Felicity	Jim	Episode: "Docuventary II"
2000	Friends	The Customer	Episode: "The One with Rachel's Sister"
2001	Friends	Waiter in Drag	Episode: "The One with Chandler's Dad"
2001	Xena: Warrior Princess	Caligula	Episodes: "The God You Know", "You Are There"
2001	Son of the Beach	Beverly	Episode: "B.J. Blue Hawaii"
2005	Wanted	Paula	Episode: "Lips Are Lips"
2008	Californication	Lady in Jail	Episode: "The Great Ashby"

== Awards and nominations ==
Year	Award	Category	Nominated work	Result
1994	Fangoria Chainsaw Awards	Best Actor	Jack Be Nimble	Nominated
1997	L.A. Outfest	Outstanding Actor in a Feature Film	Never Met Picasso	Won
