= Kiss & Tell (1997 film) =

- Theatrical release poster
- Directed by: Jordan Alan
- Produced by: Adam Fast; Andrew Golov
- Starring: Justine Bateman; Heather Graham
- Cinematography: Ron Travisano; David Wittkower
- Edited by: Ed Marx
- Production company: Terminal Bliss Pictures
- Distributed by: Legacy Releasing; Republic Pictures
- Release date: October 17, 1997
- Running time: 96 minutes
- Country: United States
- Language: English

Kiss & Tell, titled Kiss and Tell on its theatrical release poster, is a 1997 American film directed by Jordan Alan. It was made largely through improvisation.

== Plot ==
Justine Bateman plays Molly, a performance artist who is found dead. Police detectives interview her friends (played by Heather Graham and others) to learn who killed her and why.

== Cast ==
- Justine Bateman as Molly McMannis
- Richmond Arquette as Detective Bob Starr
- Lewis Arquette as Inspector Dan Furbal
- Peter Greene as Detective John Finnigan
- Jill Hennessy as Interrogator Angela Pierce
- Robert Cait as Dr. Goldwin, The Pathologist
- Assumpta Serna as Dr. Monica DeBirdy
- Teresa Hill as Ivy Roberts
- Heather Graham as Susan Pretsel
- Rose McGowan as Jasmine Hoyle
- Maria Cina as Cynthia Tie
- Pamela Gidley as Beta Carotene
- Alexis Arquette as Amerod Burkowitz
- Nina Siemaszko as Shelly
- Traci Lind as Molly's Roommate
- Brian Avery as Brian Humphries, The Producer
- Scott Cleverdon as Scott DeBirdy
- David Arquette as Skippy, The Forensic Man
- Roxana Zal as Sissy, The Forensic Woman
- Lukas Haas as Don, The Forensic Intern
- Billy Devlin as Liam McMannis
- Christa Miller as Alex Stoddard
- Alexandra Paul as Bambi, The Manicurist
- Mariah O'Brien as Emma, The Sketch Artist
- Todd Newman as Rico "The Rican"

== Production ==
Kiss & Tell was made largely through improvisation over the course of a year, on and off, on 16mm film. The film featured in a small role David Faustino, known for his work on Fox's Married... with Children, which ended the year the film was released. One of Married... with Children's writers at the time, Todd Newman, also had a small acting role in the film.

== Reception ==
The film received mixed reviews. Merle Bertrand of Film Threat called the film "a mess" and "confusing"". According to the Hollywood Reporter the film was instead "a candidate for eventual cult status". Kevin Thomas of the Los Angeles Times gave a mixed review, stating that Alan "demonstrates his capability in handling a large cast that is by and large improvising" but that the movie "looks and sounds better than it is".
