= Small Potatoes (The X-Files) =

- The X-Files episode
- A baby born with a tail. This effect was added in post-production with CGI technology.
- Episode no.: Season 4 Episode 20
- Directed by: Cliff Bole
- Written by: Vince Gilligan
- Production code: 4X20
- Original air date: April 20, 1997
- Running time: 44 minutes

Guest appearances
- Mitch Pileggi as Walter Skinner; Darin Morgan as Eddie Van Blundht; Christine Cavanaugh as Amanda Nelligan; Lee de Broux as Eddie's Father; Robert Rozen as Dr. Alton Pugh; Paul McGillion as Angry Husband; Jennifer Sterling as Angry Wife; David Cameron as Deputy; Forbes Angus as Security Guard; Peter Kelamis as Second Husband; Lynn Johnson as Health Department Doctor; Carrie Cain Sparks as Duty Nurse; Tom Braidwood as Melvin Frohike (voice); Dean Haglund as Richard Langly (voice)

Episode chronology
← Previous "Synchrony"	Next → "Zero Sum"
- The X-Files season 4

"Small Potatoes" is the twentieth episode of the fourth season of the American science fiction television series The X-Files. It premiered on the Fox network in the United States appropriately on April 20, 1997 (4/20, also the number of the season/episode). It was written by Vince Gilligan and directed by Cliff Bole. The episode is a "Monster-of-the-Week" story, unconnected to the series' wider mythology. "Small Potatoes" received a Nielsen rating of 13.0 and was viewed by 20.86 million people in its initial broadcast. The episode received positive reviews from critics, with many applauding the entry's humorous tone.

The show centers on FBI special agents Fox Mulder (David Duchovny) and Dana Scully (Gillian Anderson), who work on cases linked to the paranormal, called X-Files. Mulder is a believer in the paranormal, and the skeptical Scully has been assigned to debunk his work. In this episode, a small town is “blessed” by babies being born with tails. Mulder and Scully arrive only to encounter a suspect, Eddie Van Blundht (Darin Morgan), who proves nearly impossible to identify.

"Small Potatoes" was written by Gilligan in an attempt to write a lighthearted episode; he did not want to develop a reputation for only writing dark stories. Gilligan asked former series writer Darin Morgan, who had penned four episodes in the second and third seasons, to play Eddie Van Blundht. In fact, the role was written specifically with Morgan in mind. In the original script, the babies were born with wings instead of tails. The effect was eventually changed to tails, because, according to Gilligan, they were funnier.

== Plot ==
Agents Fox Mulder (David Duchovny) and Dana Scully (Gillian Anderson) investigate the birth of five babies in the town of Martinsburg, West Virginia, who were born with tails. The mother of the most recent baby, Amanda Nelligan, tells the agents that the father of her baby is Luke Skywalker. By researching the baby's chromosomes it is discovered that all five share the same father. The parents of the children blame the local fertility doctor, who had used insemination to impregnate all of the mothers but Nelligan. Mulder spots a janitor nearby with signs that he formerly had a tail. When he runs, Mulder chases him and catches him. The janitor, Eddie Van Blundht, is discovered to be the father of all of the children. Scully believes Eddie used a date rape drug although Mulder questions how he could be in the position to give it to the women.

Eddie escapes by transforming his face into that of the booking cop and knocking him out with a blow to the head. Mulder and Scully visit Eddie's father, a former circus performer who claims he still has his tail. Mulder and Scully soon realize the father is actually Eddie when he addresses Mulder by name without having been introduced. The agents give chase, but Eddie escapes. He then transforms into the husband of a woman he impregnated and hides out in their house. When the real husband comes home early, Eddie transforms into Mulder and leaves the couple confused. Mulder and Scully meanwhile discover the desiccated remains of Eddie's father hidden in the attic. Performing an autopsy on the body, Scully finds that he had an extra sheet of muscle under his skin, which Mulder concludes Eddie inherited and uses to transform his appearance.

As Mulder, Eddie visits Nelligan, showing her a photo of Eddie. Nelligan tells him that she went out with him in high school, but views him as a loser lacking drive and ambition. The disappointed Eddie leaves just as the real Mulder shows up. Realizing that Eddie just visited Nelligan in his guise, Mulder searches for him down the hospital corridors. He finds the fertility doctor and a security guard nearby and handcuffs them to each other, believing one of them to be Eddie. The real Eddie, however, is hiding in a vent above. He gets the jump on Mulder and locks him up in the hospital basement. Again as Mulder, Eddie tells Scully that he feels the case is a waste of time and they should return to Washington.

Eddie returns to Washington as Mulder with Scully and presents the case to Skinner with a poorly written report. Eddie visits Mulder's office, then his apartment, being surprised at what a loser Mulder appears to be (though highly pleased with how attractive a man he now is in Mulder's face - as he admires himself and practices his 'agent moves' in the mirror). Later that evening, Eddie visits Scully with a bottle of wine and tries to get her drunk and seduce her. As a reluctant Scully is about to give in to a kiss, the real Mulder breaks in and interrupts them. Revealed, Eddie sheepishly reverts to his actual form, shocking Scully. A month later, Mulder visits Eddie in prison. Eddie complains at being given muscle relaxants to prevent him from turning into someone else, asking if that was Mulder's doing. Eddie then tells Mulder that he was born a loser, but Mulder is one by choice and that he should seriously "live a little".

== Production ==
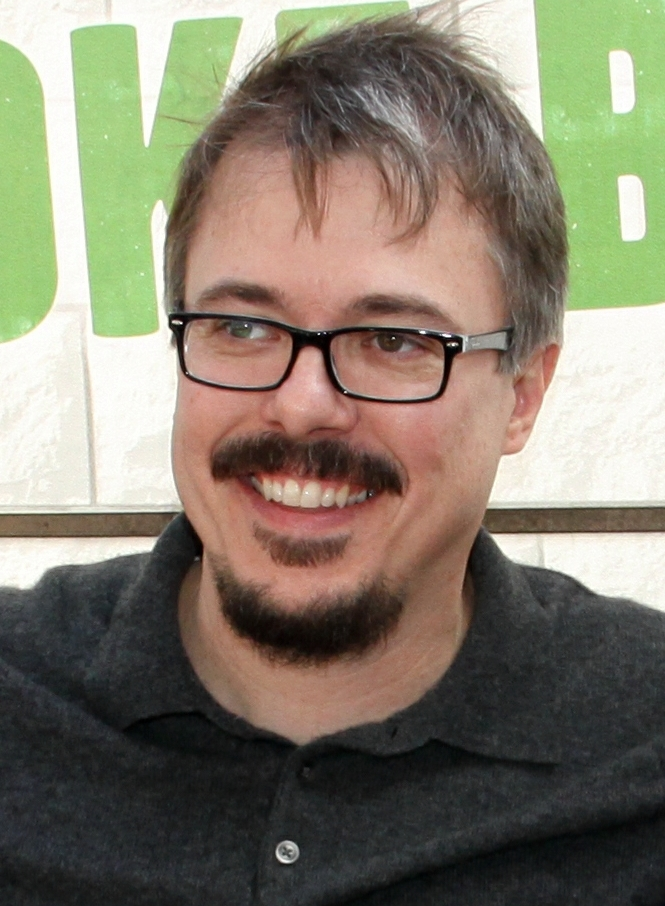
Vince Gilligan wrote the episode to be intentionally humorous.

"Small Potatoes" was written by Vince Gilligan, who prior to working on The X-Files had worked on the script for a number of comedy movies. When devising this episode, Gilligan thus decided to return to his roots and write a humorous episode. Gilligan's rationale was two-fold: First, he did not want to become known for only writing dark episodes. Second, he wanted to "lighten up" the rather bleak fourth season, which had featured a number of grim episodes and also introduced a story-arc in which Scully develops cancer. After getting approval from series creator Chris Carter, Gilligan asked former series writer Darin Morgan—who had penned four episodes in the second and third seasons—to play Eddie Van Blundht. In fact, the role was written specifically with Morgan in mind, as Gilligan had seen and was impressed by Morgan's acting in a student film he had made while a student at Loyola Marymount University.

In the original script, the babies were born with wings instead of tails. While research revealed that such a mutation was theoretically possible, the wings were changed to tails in the final version of the script because the wings were not considered cute enough. Gilligan also felt that "tails were just funnier" and that the wings would be harder to add in post-production. The tails were created with computer-generated imagery (CGI) technology, with a green mark painted on the babies' backs serving as a reference for the animators.

The cast and the crew of the show thoroughly enjoyed the episode. David Duchovny was pleased with the script, describing it as a "great" episode that was fun to film. Gilligan complimented both Duchovny for his comedic performance and Gillian Anderson for acting as the "straight woman" in the episode.

== Reception ==
"Small Potatoes" was originally broadcast in the United States on the Fox network on April 20, 1997, and was first broadcast in the United Kingdom on BBC One on February 4, 1998. This episode earned a Nielsen rating of 13.0, with a 20 share, meaning that roughly 13.0 percent of all television-equipped households, and 20 percent of households watching television, were tuned in to the episode. It was viewed by 20.86 million viewers.

The episode has received largely positive reviews from television critics. Author Phil Farrand rated the episode as his fourth favorite episode of the first four seasons in his book The Nitpickers Guide to the X-Files. Reviewer Emily VanDerWerff of The A.V. Club gave "Small Potatoes" an A, saying that it "isn’t the very best X-Files episode (though it’s certainly up there), but it’s perhaps the easiest episode to call your “favorite,” the most approachable episode, if you will" and that while Gilligan penned better X-Files installments later, "he’s never written one as effortlessly playful and inventive as this one. VanDerWerff later called the episode one of the "10 must-see episodes" and named it "Gilligan’s finest comedic achievement". Topless Robot named "Small Potatoes" the eighth funniest episode of the series. Starpulse listed it as the eighth best episode of the series. The episode is popular with fans, specifically for the scene where Eddie, who has changed into Mulder, tries to seduce Scully in her apartment. Robert Shearman, in his book Wanting to Believe: A Critical Guide to The X-Files, Millennium & The Lone Gunmen, rated the episode five stars out of five and wrote that "this is what Vince Gilligan has been working towards all season." The author praised Gilligan's writing, applauding his decision to critically examine Mulder rather than merely tell jokes. Furthermore, Shearman commended Morgan's acting. Paula Vitaris from Cinefantastique gave the episode a rave review and awarded it a rare four stars out of four. She described it as a "four course meal of comic riches" and praised the writing style of Gilligan, calling him "the believer who writes from inside the characters' heads".

The episode, however, was not without its critics. Tor.com reviewer Meghan Deans was more critical of the episode, writing that it had a "flawed construction that diminishes what should have been one of the series' smartest and most affectionate demonstrations of self-parody". She found the way it attempted to depict Van Blundht as a sympathetic villain and play rape for laughs to be unsettling. However, she did praise the way the episode continued the comedic tradition of making fun of Mulder. Cyriaque Lamar from i09 called Eddie Van Blundht one of "The 10 Most Ridiculous X-Files Monsters". The reviewer, however, did amend his article, writing, "Some readers are concerned that I'm hating on 'Small Potatoes,' which is not the case. That episode was definitely fun, but Eddie impregnated a woman while impersonating Mark Hamill. If that's not a ridiculous monster-of-the-week, I don't know what is."

== Bibliography ==
- Farrand, Phil (1997). The Nitpicker's Guide for X-Philes. Dell Publishing. ISBN 0-440-50808-8.
- Hurwitz, Matt; Knowles, Chris (2008). The Complete X-Files. Insight Editions. ISBN 978-1-933784-80-9.
- Meisler, Andy (1998). I Want to Believe: The Official Guide to the X-Files Volume 3. Harper Prism. ISBN 0061053864.
- Shearman, Robert (2009). Wanting to Believe: A Critical Guide to The X-Files, Millennium & The Lone Gunmen. Mad Norwegian Press. ISBN 978-0975944691.
