= Adva Reichman =

Israeli writer and director

- אדוה רייכמן
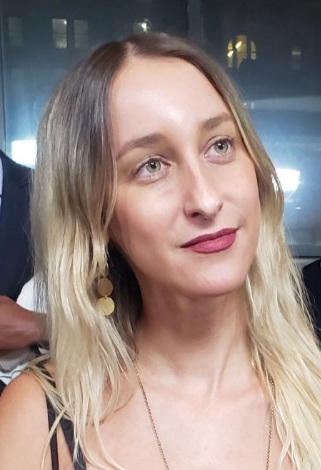
- Reichman in 2020
- Born: 1987 (age 38–39); Ra'anana, Israel
- Occupations: Writer, director

Adva Reichman (Hebrew: אדוה רייכמן; born 1987) is an Israeli writer and director based in Los Angeles, California.

== Life and career ==
Reichman was born in Ra'anana, Israel. Between 2013 and 2015 she worked in the Israeli media. She holds a BFA from the IDC Herzliya in Israel and an MFA in film and TV production from the USC School of Cinematic Arts in California. In 2019, Reichman directed the short film, Something to Live For, about the Israeli-Palestinian conflict. The film was screened at the LA Shorts Fest, Urbanworld Film Festival, and Taormina Film Fest. In 2018, Reichman co-wrote the feature film, Samir, a current adaptation to the Count of Monte Cristo.

Adva's feature script, Project Fog, was a semi-finalist in the 2020 Academy Nicholl Fellowships in Screenwriting and a Flickers' Rhode Island International Film Festival winner.

== Filmography ==
Year	Title	Writer	Director	Note
2016	Life After All	✓	✓	Short film
2016	Silhouette	✓	✓	Short film
2019	Something To Live For	✓	✓	Short film
2020	Samir	✓		Feature film

== Awards and nominations ==
Year	Result	Award	Category	Work	Ref.
2019	Won	Indie Fest	Women Filmmakers	Silhouette	
2019	Won	Indie Fest	Award of Excellence	Something To Live For	
2019	Nominated	Cyprus International Film Festival	Best International Short	Something To Live For	
2019	Nominated	LA Shorts Fest	Best Short Film	Something To Live For	
