= Kaddish (The X-Files) =

- The X-Files episode
- The ceremonial Jewish ring. The ring was a real Jewish relic owned by a rabbi who survived the Holocaust, and was used to wed two of Howard Gordon's friends. This later inspired him to write the episode.
- Episode no.: Season 4 Episode 15
- Directed by: Kim Manners
- Written by: Howard Gordon
- Production code: 4X12
- Original air date: February 16, 1997
- Running time: 44 minutes

Guest appearances
- Justine Miceli as Ariel Luria; David Groh as Jacob Weiss; Harrison Coe as Isaac Luria/Golem; Channon Roe as Derick Banks; Jabin Litwiniec as Clinton Bascombe; Timur Karabilgin as Tony Oliver; Jonathan Whittaker as Curt Brunjes; David Wohl as Kenneth Ungar; George Gordon as the Detective; Murrey Rabinovitch as 1st Hasidic man; David Freedman as Rabbi

Episode chronology
← Previous "Memento Mori"	Next → "Unrequited"
- The X-Files season 4

"Kaddish" is the fifteenth episode of the fourth season of the American science fiction television series The X-Files. It was written by producer Howard Gordon and directed by Kim Manners. The episode originally aired on the Fox network on February 16, 1997. The episode is a "Monster-of-the-Week" story, a stand-alone plot unconnected to the series' wider mythology, or overarching history. The episode received a Nielsen household rating of 10.3 and was viewed by 16.56 million viewers. It received moderately positive reviews from critics.

The show centers on FBI special agents Fox Mulder (David Duchovny) and Dana Scully (Gillian Anderson) who work on cases linked to the paranormal, called X-Files. In the episode, Isaac Luria (Harrison Coe), a Jewish man, is killed by a group of teenagers working for a racist shop owner. One of the assailants, however, is soon strangled to death and the fingerprints on his neck are Isaac's. Despite other factors, Mulder becomes convinced that a golem is attempting to avenge Isaac's murder.

"Kaddish" was written by Gordon due to his fascination with the legend of the Golem from Jewish folklore. Originally, the script called for the antagonist to be an African American "Louis Farrakhan-like" character, but Fox was concerned that the show's increasing popularity with black viewers would be damaged by this, and Gordon agreed to make the villains into, in his words, "cartoonish neo-Nazis". Gastown, Vancouver stood in for many of the exterior shots that were supposed to be Brooklyn. No Jewish synagogue would rent out their space for the episode, so Shaughnessy Heights United Church was renovated to look like one. This included completely redecorating the pews, carpet, and light fixtures, as well as crafting a Jewish altar. The episode's title is a reference to the Jewish mourning prayer service (Hebrew: קדיש). "Kaddish" has been critically examined for its themes concerning love and hate.

== Plot ==
In Brooklyn, New York, a group of Hasidic Jews gather at a cemetery for the funeral of Isaac Luria (Harrison Coe), who had been beaten and shot to death by a gang of three young neo-Nazis. The last to leave is Isaac's betrothed, Ariel (Justine Miceli), and her father, Jacob Weiss (David Groh). During nightfall, a dark figure enters the cemetery and crafts a man-shaped sculpture out of mud.

When one of Isaac's assailants is found strangled with the dead man's fingerprints on his body, Fox Mulder (David Duchovny) and Dana Scully (Gillian Anderson) are called in to investigate. Scully suggests that the murder was an act of retribution, and argues that the evidence was staged to look like revenge from beyond the grave. When the agents visit Ariel and Jacob, their request for the exhumation of Isaac's body angers the old man.

Mulder and Scully then interview Curt Brunjes (Jonathan Whittaker), the racist owner of a copy shop across the street from the market where Isaac worked. Mulder tells Brunjes that the other two boys, who work for Brunjes, are in danger. Scully mentions that there is a rumor spreading that Isaac has risen from the grave to avenge his death. The two boys, who are eavesdropping on the conversation, are terrified at this prospect.

That night, the boys dig up Isaac's grave and find his body intact. While retrieving tools from the car, one of the boys is brutally murdered. The next morning, Mulder and Scully find a Sefer Yetzirah, a book on Jewish mysticism buried with Isaac's body; it mysteriously bursts into flames. On the book is Jacob's name. The agents search for Jacob, finding him in a synagogue with the hanged body of the last remaining boy. Although Jacob admits to both of the murders, Mulder believes that a Golem—a creature from Jewish mysticism—is the true murderer.

Later, Brunjes is found murdered and Mulder and Scully watch the shop's surveillance tape. They discover that the Golem has features similar to Isaac. Mulder deduces that, because Ariel and Isaac were not officially wed in a Jewish synagogue, Ariel created the Golem out of love to serve as a surrogate for her late husband. The two agents arrive at the synagogue to find Ariel and the creature exchanging wedding vows. After an intense fight, in which Jacob and Mulder are both wounded, Ariel declares her love for Isaac and returns the creature to dust.

== Production ==
=== Writing ===
I was intrigued by the myth [of the Golem] from the time I was a kid. I revisited it at the very beginning of The X-Files four years ago, and for one reason or another, I was persuaded either not to do it or hadn't really figured out the way I wanted to do it.

— Howard Gordon, talking about his interest in the myth of the Golem

"Kaddish" was written by producer Howard Gordon, directed by Kim Manners, and dedicated to the memory of Lillian Katz, Gordon's grandmother. Gordon was inspired to write the episode based on his heritage. He noted, "I was always compelled by the Golem mythology. We had never dealt with the horrors of antisemitism and the power of the word [on The X-Files]. And because I'm Jewish, it was something that was really compelling to me personally."

The idea to create a story centering on a Golem, however, had been proposed several times before by "probably every Jewish writer who's passed through", according to Gordon. However, Gordon's unique take on the story, complete with an "emotional basis", began to develop after he attended a wedding of two of his friends. During the ceremony, the officiating rabbi, who was a survivor of the Holocaust, used a real Jewish relic: the communal ring that was eventually featured in the episode. The ring inspired Gordon to pen a "Romeo and Juliet-like" story that revolved around the power of love and the powerful desire to bring back loved ones from the dead. As such, the episode's title is a reference to the Jewish mourning prayer service.

Gordon's original version of the script called for both the protagonists and the antagonists to be African Americans, and the main protagonist to be a "Louis Farrakhan-like" character. Gordon later rewrote the script because he realized "black anti-Semitism is a very subtle and difficult subject and not what I needed in my dramatic structure." Gordon wanted much of his episode to focus on anti-Semitism, thereby contrasting sharply with the episode's main theme about love. To create Brunjes's propaganda, Gordon reached out to the Anti-Defamation League and requested samples from their archives. These articles were later reproduced and used in the episode with only "minor alterations".

=== Casting and characterization ===
Justine Miceli, the actress who played Ariel, based her character's sorrowful demeanor on the memory of her own father's death due to cancer. Although she is not Jewish, Miceli was assisted by a friend's rabbi, who helped her learn the proper pronunciation for many of the Jewish prayers used in the episode. Gordon was adamant that he did not want Jacob Weiss to be portrayed in a stereotypical way. Initially, he was disappointed when actor David Groh affected a Yiddish accent, for fear that Weiss' scenes could "lapse into parody rather easily". Gordon, however, stated that Groh had a "certain verisimilitude" and that in the end it was "the right choice" for him to have the accent.

Many fans on the internet were hoping that the episode would reveal whether or not Mulder is Jewish. In the episode, however, Mulder is unable to identify a Jewish book, states that he does not know Hebrew, and quips that Jesus returned from the dead. When asked whether or not Mulder is Jewish, Gordon said that he did not think that he is, nor did he think he is "even half-Jewish". He did, however, note that "there's something about David [Duchovny] that could be Jewish or that has a Jewish sensibility."

=== Filming and music ===
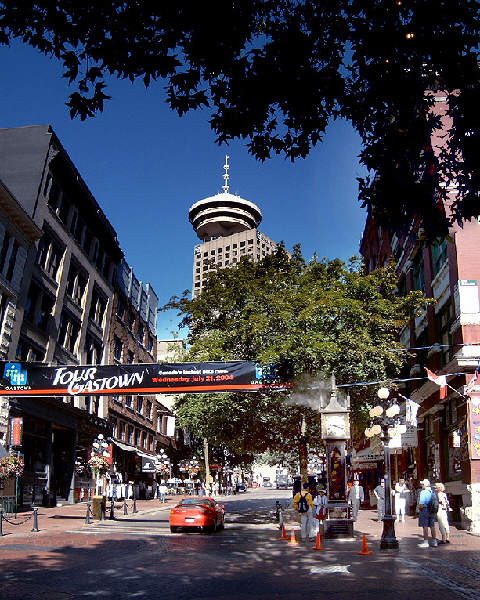
Outdoor shots were filmed at Gastown, Vancouver.

The scene featuring the burning book was difficult to film, as the pyrotechnics refused to cooperate. David Duchovny and Gillian Anderson ended up spending far more production time than originally allotted to shoot the scene. Gastown, Vancouver—described as "the only area in Vancouver that even remotely resembles residential Queens"—stood in for many of the exterior shots. Shots at the Weiss' apartment were filmed at the Winter's Hotel. Originally, the production team was going to remove the hotel's neon sign, but director Manners, instead, decided to "move the camera another five feet", thereby avoiding "prohibitive" expenses.

None of the synagogues in the Greater Vancouver area were willing to let the production crew use their space, so the scenes in the synagogue were actually filmed at Shaughnessy Heights United Church. The church was chosen because its "gothic interior" and "stained glass windows ... resembled many New York synagogues". The church was booked for two weeks so that the entire interior could be redecorated to look like a legitimate Jewish temple. This included completely redesigning the pews, carpet, and light fixtures, as well as crafting a Jewish altar. During the construction of the altar, a Hebrew translation of the Ten Commandments was needed, but the series' on-set Hebrew advisor was not available. Consequently, the art staff, to quote art director Gary Allen, "ended up faking it [i.e. the text]."

Series composer Mark Snow heavily featured "clarinet, violin, and cello solos" in the episode's score and readily admits to "borrow[ing]" J.S. Bach's Fugue in G minor, "Little", BWV 578 piece. He noted, "The aim was to wind up somewhere between a Klezmer band and Schindler's List."

== Themes ==
Gordon said that love is the central conceit of the episode. Although, in the myth of the Golem, the creature is soulless, Gordon took "some liberties" with the legend. He wanted "Kaddish" to "literally be about resurrection". Ariel creates an imperfect reflection of her husband by crafting the Golem from mud. In essence, she is trying to play God, a role that Gordon later likened to Victor Frankenstein, the scientist from Mary Shelley's famous novel Frankenstein; or, The Modern Prometheus (1823). However, Ariel and Frankenstein differ in the fact that Ariel's flaw was related to her "loving [Isaac] too much, not being able to let go, because of the cruelty and injustice of what she suffered." In this manner, Ariel's motivation for creating the Golem are "slightly more romantically skewed".

Robert Shearman, in his book Wanting to Believe: A Critical Guide to The X-Files, Millennium & The Lone Gunmen, analyzed Gordon's portrayal of racism and anti-Semitism. The author wrote that Gordon "makes [a] very convincing point" when he argues that hatemongers like Carl Brunjes—who are openly hateful of other cultures but would never, personally, hurt them—are "just as guilty" as openly violent individuals, such as the "three Nazi thugs who beat and shoot a defenceless man."

== Broadcast and reception ==
"Kaddish" originally aired on the Fox network on February 16, 1997. This episode earned a Nielsen rating of 10.3, with a 15 share, meaning that roughly 10.3 percent of all television-equipped households, and 15 percent of households watching television, were tuned in to the episode. It was viewed by 16.56 million viewers.

The episode received moderately positive reviews from television critics. Andy Meisler, in his book I Want to Believe: The Official Guide to the X-Files Volume 3, called the episode "one of the best non-mythological episodes of the fourth season" due to its "seamless integration of character development, social commentary and the supernatural." Juliette Harrisson of Den of Geek named "Kaddish" the best stand-alone episode of season four and called its conceit "absolutely real and utterly tragic" despite being "highly fantastical". Zack Handlen of The A.V. Club rated the episode "B+", opining that, while it was "the sort of episode that works best if you enjoy it for its style and presentation without getting too caught up in the script", it felt "appropriate". Handlen did, however, criticize the episode's characterization of Scully, noting that her scientific counter-arguments were "becoming less about applying common sense to madness, and more just arguing for arguing's sake."

Author Robert Shearman awarded the episode three stars out of five, and called it "one of [Gordon's] best". He praised many aspects of the script, particularly the "real anger" that made the episode "something special". Nonetheless, he felt that the plot "offer[ed] nothing unexpected" and that its position, following the revelation that Scully has cancer in "Leonard Betts", caused it to look "as if it's cheating on the consequences of Scully's illness". Paula Vitaris from Cinefantastique gave the episode a positive review and awarded it three stars out of four. She called it a "flawed yet unusually affecting episode". Vitaris cited the Golem's disintegration as "a leitmotif, a reminder of death, a beautiful way to translate into visual terms the depth of Ariel's grief."
