= Terminal Bliss =

- Theatrical release poster
- Directed by: Jordan Alan
- Written by: Jordan Alan
- Produced by: Brian Cox
- Starring: Timothy Owen; Luke Perry; Estee Chandler; Sonia Curtis; Micah Grant; Alexis Arquette
- Music by: Frank Becker
- Production company: Cannon Films
- Release date: October 31, 1992
- Running time: 79 minutes
- Country: United States
- Language: English

Terminal Bliss is a 1992 film directed by Jordan Alan and starring Luke Perry in his first lead film role.

== Premise ==
Two adolescent children of wealthy parents deal with the emotional travails of spoiled youth by indulging in self-destructive behavior including drugs, parties, and teenage sex. Friends John (Luke Perry) and Alex (Timothy Owen) deal with issues of betrayal involving Alex's girlfriend Stevie (Estee Chandler).

== Cast ==
- Luke Perry as John Hunter
- Estee Chandler as Stevie Bradley
- Sonia Curtis as Kirsten Davis
- Micah Grant as Bucky O'Connell
- Alexis Arquette as Craig Murphy

== Reception ==
The film was poorly received by critics.

It debuted at number 17 at the domestic box office.
