= Synchrony (The X-Files) =

- The X-Files episode
- Episode no.: Season 4 Episode 19
- Directed by: James Charleston
- Written by: Howard Gordon; David Greenwalt
- Production code: 4X19
- Original air date: April 13, 1997
- Running time: 43 minutes

Guest appearances
- Jed Rees as Lucas Menand; Joseph Fuqua as Jason Nichols; Susan Lee Hoffman as Lisa Ianelli; Hiro Kanagawa as Dr. Yonechi; Jonathan Walker as Chuck Lukerman; Brent Chapman as Security Cop; Eric Buermeyer as The Bus Driver; Patricia Idlette as The Desk Clerk; Austin Basile as Bellman; Alison Matthews as The Doctor; Michael Fairman as Older Jason Nichols

Episode chronology
← Previous "Max"	Next → "Small Potatoes"
- The X-Files season 4

"Synchrony" is the nineteenth episode of the fourth season of the American science fiction television series The X-Files. It was written by Howard Gordon and David Greenwalt and directed by James Charleston. The episode aired in the United States on April 13, 1997, on the Fox network. The episode is a "Monster-of-the-Week" story, a stand-alone plot, unconnected to the series' wider mythology. "Synchrony" earned a Nielsen rating of 11.3, being watched by 18.09 million people upon its initial broadcast. The episode received mixed to positive reviews from television critics.

The show centers on FBI special agents Fox Mulder (David Duchovny) and Dana Scully (Gillian Anderson) who work on cases linked to the paranormal, called X-Files. In this episode, Mulder and Scully investigate a murder for which the suspect presents an incredible alibi—that the death was foretold by an old man able to see into the future. Upon investigating the case, the duo discover an increasingly bizarre series of events that leads Mulder to believe time travel may be involved.

Gordon and Greenwalt wrote the episode after being inspired by an article in Scientific American about time travel and quantum physics. The idea of a scientist trying to stop the invention of something terrible was inspired by Manhattan Project physicist J. Robert Oppenheimer, who complained to Harry S. Truman about the 1945 atomic bombings of Japan.

== Plot ==
In Cambridge, Massachusetts, MIT cryogenics researchers Jason Nichols (Joseph Fuqua) and Lucas Menand (Jed Rees) become embroiled in an argument as they walk down a city street. They are approached by an old man (Michael Fairman), who warns Menand that he will be killed by a bus at 11:46 p.m. that evening, but Menand ignores him. After the man is arrested by campus security, his apparent prophecy is proven true when Jason tries, but fails, to save Menand, who is promptly run over by a bus and killed at exactly 11:46 p.m.

Fox Mulder (David Duchovny) and Dana Scully (Gillian Anderson) investigate the case, learning that Jason was taken into custody after the bus driver told police that he (Jason) pushed Menand into the path of his vehicle. However, Jason tells authorities that he was actually trying to save Menand. The security guard who arrested the old man is found frozen to death after exposure to a chemical refrigerant. Mulder interviews Jason, who explains Menand threatened to go public with a claim that Jason had falsified data on a research paper.

The old man kills Dr. Yonechi (Hiro Kanagawa), a Japanese researcher on the topic of biological vitrification for cryopreservation, by pricking him with a metallic stylus, introducing an unknown chemical into his body. The agents approach Nichols' girlfriend and colleague, Lisa Ianelli (Susan Lee Hoffman), who recognizes the chemical compound as a rapid freezing agent that Jason had been engineering for years. However, she claims that the compound has not yet been invented and that if Yonechi was injected with the chemical, he may not be dead. With Lisa's help, Scully and a team of medical personnel successfully resuscitate Yonechi, only for his body temperature to rapidly increase until he bursts into flames. When getting off the bus, Lisa finds that she is being followed by the old man, who shows the weapon but runs off; when asked by Scully and Mulder about him, she reveals that Jason is covering for her in faking data related to a potential grant.

Police receive a tip that the old man is living at a nearby hotel. Inside the old man's room, the agents discover a faded color photograph picturing Jason, Yonechi and Lisa toasting champagne glasses in the cryonics laboratory. Mulder deduces from the picture that the old man is a time traveller who is attempting to alter that future, and that he is none other than Jason Nichols.

Lisa locates the elderly man and confronts him; however, he injects her with the chemical after explaining that Lisa will be responsible for the coming future. Scully successfully resuscitates Lisa. Jason confronts his elderly self in the computer mainframe room at the cryogenic laboratory, where the old man has erased all of Jason's files from the mainframe. The old man tells Jason that the success of their research made time travel possible, but also plunged the world into chaos. Jason lunges at the old man, choking him as he demands to travel back to save Lisa. Mulder arrives with the news that Lisa has been saved, and the elder Jason wraps his arms around his younger self and spontaneously bursts into flames, the fire consuming them both.

As Lisa is loaded on to an ambulance to receive further treatment, Scully breaks the news to her that Jason died in the mainframe room fire. Mulder then reminds Scully of a statement in her thesis in which she asserts that "... although multidimensionality suggests infinite outcomes in an infinite number of universes, each universe can produce only one outcome," which indicates that, despite Jason Nichols effectively erasing himself from the future, the rapid freezing agent compound will be discovered by someone in the current universe, resulting in the eventual discovery of time travel.

Later, Lisa sets to work at the cryonics laboratory, attempting to reconstruct the chemical compound.

== Production ==
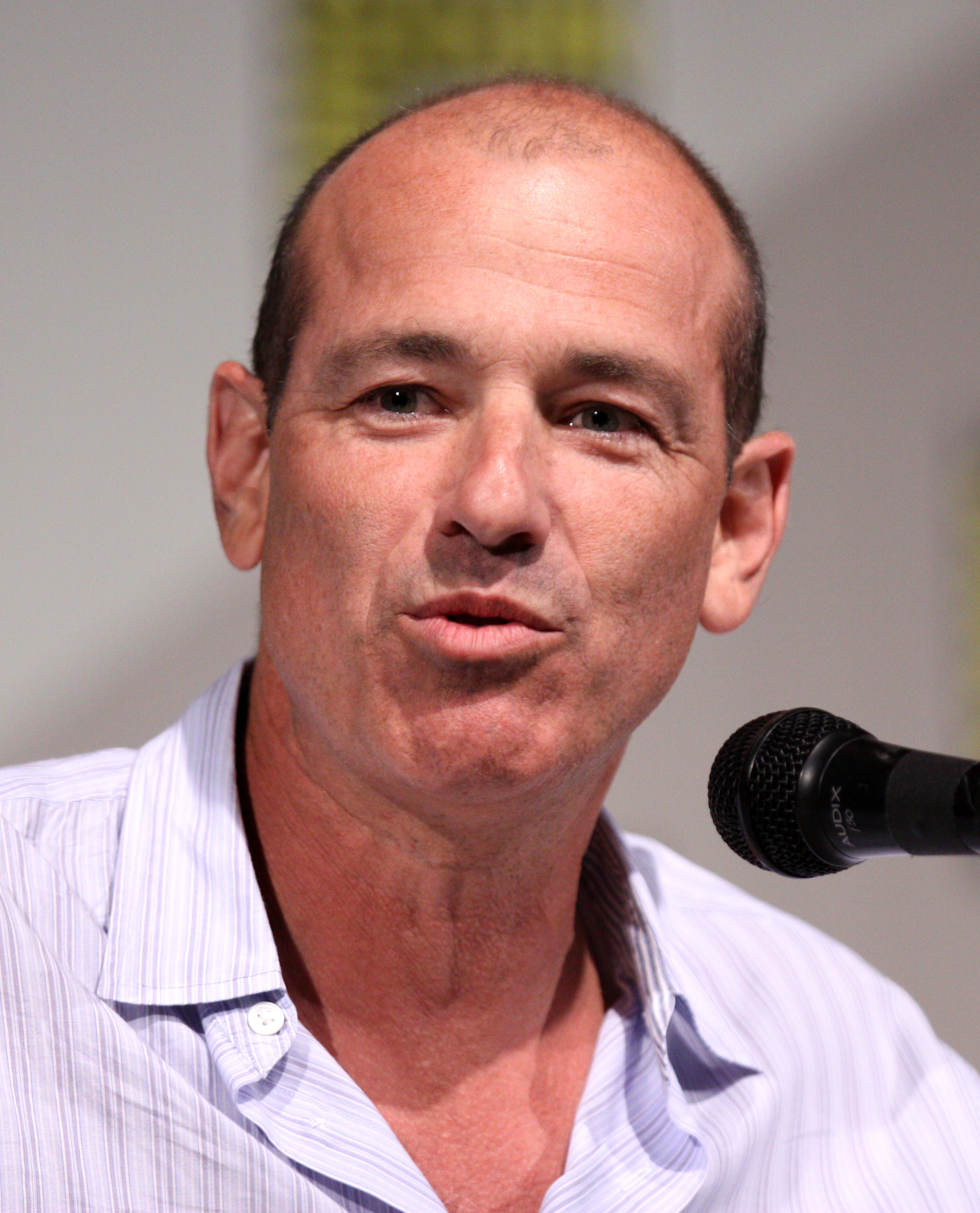
The concept of the episode originated from David Greenwalt and Howard Gordon's (pictured) idea to write an episode about time travel.

After series creator Chris Carter and Howard Gordon completed the script for "Unrequited", the former assigned the latter to develop a new episode with David Greenwalt, who was new to the show and had been hired a few months prior as a producer. Gordon and Greenwalt met up and began writing what would become "Synchrony". During this process, they struggled to find a good plot, and they almost submitted a story involving an inmate swapping bodies with another man to escape prison. However, Gordon was unsatisfied with this storyline, as he believed it to be far too derivative of his previous episode. Eventually, the duo read an article in Scientific American about time travel: the article claimed that while classical physics does not allow for temporal displacement, quantum physics does. Gordon and Greenwalt were intrigued by the concept and decided to re-situate their episode around a related premise.

Gordon decided that the most affecting and X-Files-like story should involve a time-traveler who "turns out to be you". Howard was inspired to make the main antagonist a regretful scientist after hearing the story of Manhattan Project physicist J. Robert Oppenheimer berating U.S. President Harry S. Truman for using atomic bombs on Hiroshima and Nagasaki in 1945. This prompted Gordon to rhetorically ask: "What if Oppenheimer could go back to the past and 'uninvent' the bomb?". Soon, Gordon and Greenwalt began pondering fatalistic determinism brought about by the ability to see the future, with the former noting: "Life itself is about the unknown and discovering what is in front of us. But if everyone, or maybe some people, knew what would happen, that would create a new set of horrors, and it would need to be stopped".

The script for "Synchrony" took over a week to write, with some day-long sessions lasting over 15 hours. Gordon and Greenwalt were also assisted by fellow writers Ken Horton, John Shiban, and co-executive producer Frank Spotnitz. A few days before filming was slated to begin, Gordon was still frantically reworking the teleplay; during these last-minute rewrites, he removed a number of elements, including two "useless characters" (one of whom was a Stephen Hawking-esque scientist in a wheelchair) — a move that he claims "really tightened up the story". David Duchovny later revealed that a few of the episode's scenes were even written during filming, "because no one could know if the audience understood what was happening". Gordon later said, "In the end, I think it worked, but it's getting there that's really difficult." The experience proved so challenging that Gordon very nearly considered aborting the project, and after finally delivering the script, he swore off writing about time travel.

== Reception ==
"Synchrony" originally aired on the Fox network on April 13, 1997. This episode earned a Nielsen rating of 11.3, with an 18 share, meaning that roughly 11.3 percent of all television-equipped households, and 18 percent of households watching television, were tuned in to the episode. It was viewed by 18.01 million viewers.

The A.V. Club's Zack Handlen rated the episode a "B−". Handlen considered that while "'Synchrony' has all the pieces of my favorite kind of episode, [it] doesn't really work as well as it should" due to an emotional detachment that made him not care about the scientists and their story, and his finding Old Jason's actions to be illogical. Paula Vitaris from Cinefantastique gave "Synchrony" two out of four stars, considering it a middling episode with some effective moments, but complaining about plot holes, "not particularly compelling" supporting characters, and feeling that time travel "takes away from the reality that is this show's foundation". Robert Shearman, in his book Wanting to Believe: A Critical Guide to The X-Files, Millennium & The Lone Gunmen, rated the episode two and a half stars out of five, praising the "high concept that is told without pretension". The author also called the episode "solid and watchable" despite flaws such as the underdevelopment of the script and not fully exploring the "concept with such potential" that is time travel.

== See also ==
- Vitrification
- Quantum mechanics
- Tachyon
- Temporal paradox
- Time travel

== Bibliography ==
- Hurwitz, Matt; Knowles, Chris (2008). The Complete X-Files. Insight Editions. ISBN 978-1933784809.
- Meisler, Andy (1998). I Want to Believe: The Official Guide to the X-Files Volume 3. Harper Prism. ISBN 0061053864.
- Shearman, Robert (2009). Wanting to Believe: A Critical Guide to The X-Files, Millennium & The Lone Gunmen. Mad Norwegian Press. ISBN 978-0975944691.
