= The Gentleman Bandit =

- Directed by: Jordan Alan
- Written by: Charlie Mattera; Mark Petracca
- Produced by: Douglas Hunter; Meta Puttkammer; Charlie Mattera; Jordan Alan
- Starring: Charlie Mattera; Peter Greene; Ed Lauter; Ryan O'Neal
- Cinematography: Jordan Alan
- Edited by: Paul O'Brien; Brett Smith
- Music by: Lawrence Nash Groupe
- Production companies: Terminal Bliss Pictures; 47 Productions
- Distributed by: Pathfinder Pictures
- Release date: February 22, 2002; (Los Angeles)
- Running time: 87 or 93 minutes

The Gentleman Bandit retitled after theatrical release as Gentleman B., is a crime-drama film by producer-director Jordan Alan released in 2002. It was based on the life story of real-life reformed thief Charles Mattera.

== Plot ==
Brooklynite Nick and his childhood friend Manny grow up to become petty criminals. After Manny betrays him during a holdup, Nick goes to prison. Upon release, he visits his ex-girlfriend Maria in Los Angeles, where he learns the brutal, violent Manny has joined the police force and is divorced from Maria. Nick moves in with her and her 8-year-old daughter, Ally, and falls in with Maria's grandfatherly, ex-con landlord, Harry, who tries to groom Nick from his gruff ways. The two men come under police surveillance following a series of Beverly Hills bank robberies where the "gentleman bandit", as the press dubs him is a handsome, well-dressed man with a cut and bandage on his nose.

== Cast ==
- Charlie Mattera as Nick Vincent
- Peter Greene as Manny Breen
- Ed Lauter as Harry Koslow
- Ryan O'Neal as Bank Manager
- Justine Miceli as Maria De Razio
- Kristina Malota as Ally
- Todd Newman Michael

== Reception ==
The film received generally negative reviews, with Variety saying it "plays implausibly on screen, especially since Jordan Alan has no feel for authentic texture or volatility within the crime genre", The Hollywood Reporter calling it "minimal entertainment with nothing to recommend it," and New Times finding it "[t]edious, poorly acted and predictable." The Los Angeles Times, however, called it "[a] very good, satisfying B picture with a lot of A virtues."
