= Jordan Alan =

American film director (active 1987–2017)

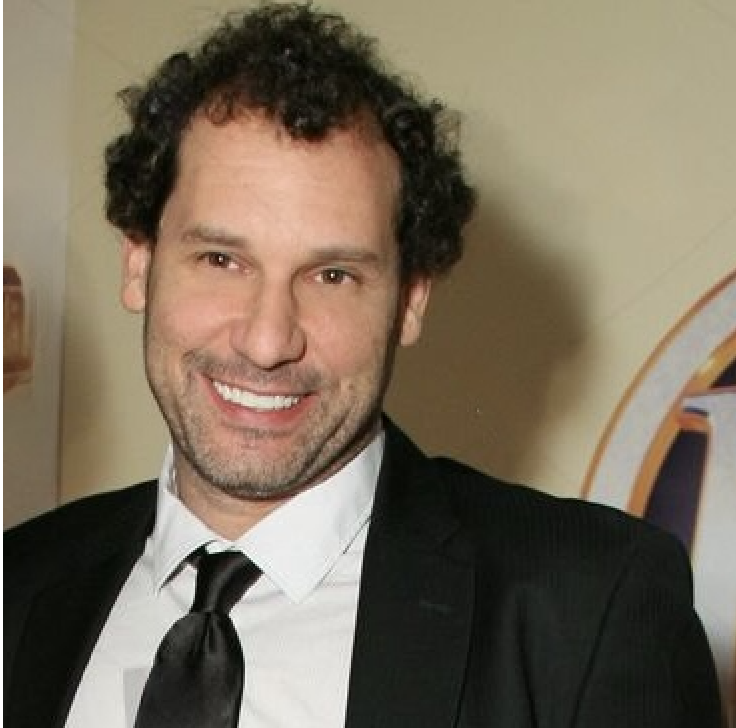
- Occupation: Director
- Years active: 1987–present
- Spouse: Amanda Righetti (m. 2006; div. 2017)
- Children: 1

Jordan Alan is an American film director, producer and television commercial director.

In 1985, Alan made a 35mm film trailer starring Sandra Bullock. The trailer was screened by South African film producer Anant Singh at Technicolor in New York City.

His films include Kiss & Tell, The Gentleman Bandit, and Cats Dancing on Jupiter, completed in 2011 and released in the US in 2015, starring Amanda Righetti, his then-wife. As of 2012 his company, Bliss Sinema, was in development on the film Deconstruction Red.

He has shot TV commercials for clients including 1-800-DENTIST, 1-800-USA-EYES, Invisalign, LA Sight Laser Center, and LA Solar Group.

== Personal life ==
Alan married actress Amanda Righetti on April 29, 2006, in Oʻahu. Righetti filed for divorce in 2017. In 2013, the couple had a son.

== Filmography ==
Year	Film
1992	Terminal Bliss
1995	Love and Happiness
1996	Kiss & Tell
1997	Cat's Cradle
1997	Missing Emotions
2002	The Gentleman Bandit
2015	Cats Dancing on Jupiter
