= Unrequited (The X-Files) =

- The X-Files episode
- Episode no.: Season 4 Episode 16
- Directed by: Michael Lange
- Story by: Howard Gordon
- Teleplay by: Howard Gordon; Chris Carter
- Production code: 4X16
- Original air date: February 23, 1997
- Running time: 42 minutes

Guest appearances
- Mitch Pileggi as Walter Skinner; Laurie Holden as Marita Covarrubias; Scott Hylands as General Benjamin Bloch; Peter LaCroix as Nathaniel Teager; Ryan Michael as Agent Cameron Hill; Don McWilliams as P.F.C. Gus Burkholder; Bill Agnew as Lt. General Peter MacDougal; Mark Holden as Agent Eugene Chandler; Larry Musser as Denny Markham; Lesley Ewen as Renee Davenport; Allan Franz as Dr. Ben Keyser; William Nunn as General Jon Steffan; William Taylor as General Leitch; Scott Owen as Leo Danzinger uncredited; Jen Jasey as Female Private

Episode chronology
← Previous "Kaddish"	Next → "Tempus Fugit"
- The X-Files season 4

"Unrequited" is the sixteenth episode of the fourth season of the American science fiction television series The X-Files. It was written by Howard Gordon and series creator Chris Carter, and directed by Michael Lange. It originally aired in the United States on February 23, 1997, on the Fox network. The episode is a "Monster-of-the-Week" story, a stand-alone plot which is unconnected to the series' wider mythology. This episode earned a Nielsen rating of 10.9 and was seen by 16.56 million viewers upon its initial broadcast. "Unrequited" received mixed to negative reviews from television critics.

The show centers on FBI special agents Fox Mulder (David Duchovny) and Dana Scully (Gillian Anderson) who work on cases linked to the paranormal, called X-Files. In this episode, the murder of a U.S. Army Lieutenant General has Mulder and Scully struggling to stop a seemingly invisible assassin. The two agents soon learn that they are doomed to failure from the start, as the U.S. government is attempting to cover up the existence of American POWs still being kept in Vietnam.

Gordon was inspired to write the episode after viewing an installment of the news series 60 Minutes that dealt with American secret agents the CIA left behind during the Vietnam War. The eventual concept that the assassin could create blind spots came after the writer spoke with his ophthalmologist brother. The entry featured a finished replica of the Vietnam Veterans Memorial, and various Canadian locales substituted for various locations in Washington, D.C.

== Plot ==
The episode begins at the National Mall, where Major General Benjamin Bloch (Scott Hylands) gives a speech to a crowd of Vietnam War veterans. Fox Mulder (David Duchovny), Dana Scully (Gillian Anderson), and Walter Skinner (Mitch Pileggi) patrol the crowd, searching for a potential gunman. However, when the agents see the gunman, he repeatedly disappears and makes their efforts to track him difficult. Mulder finds himself aiming his gun towards the panicked crowd, desperately searching for the gunman, who has disappeared right in front of him.

Twelve hours earlier, at Fort Evanston, Maryland, Lieutenant General Peter MacDougal (Bill Agnew) is shot in his limousine by the gunman. Skinner briefs the agents on the killing, noting a king of hearts playing card—used by the soldiers in Vietnam to mark their kills—was left at the scene. The FBI suspects a far-right paramilitary group, the Right Hand, of killing MacDougal in an effort to stop an upcoming re-dedication of a Vietnam war memorial in Washington.

Mulder and Scully head to Virginia to question the Right Hand's leader, Denny Markham (Larry Musser). A search of his fenced-off cabin uncovers ammunition and a photograph showing him in the company of a Sergeant Nathaniel Teager (Peter LaCroix). After being arrested, Markham reveals that Teager was a soldier in Vietnam who was left for dead as a prisoner of war. Meanwhile, at the Vietnam memorial, Teager approaches a war widow and claims that her husband is still alive as a POW. After giving the woman her husband's dog tags, Teager mysteriously disappears.

Skinner informs the agents that Teager is officially dead, and that his remains are at the Army's forensics lab. However, Mulder learns that the lab only possesses Teager's dental remains, and that the cause of his death was recorded as "inconclusive". Mulder believes that General John Steffan (William Nunn), who signed Teager's death certificate, is his next target. Teager makes his way past Pentagon security and kills Steffan in his office. Upon seeing Teager on the Pentagon's surveillance tapes, Mulder notes the frequent unexplained appearances and disappearances of Viet Cong troops reported by POWs in Vietnam.

During a meeting with Marita Covarrubias (Laurie Holden), Mulder learns that Steffan, McDougal, and Bloch were all involved in negotiations concerning POWs. Meanwhile, as Bloch's motorcade makes its way to the Mall, Scully spots Teager in the crowd, only to see him vanish in an instant. Mulder tells Skinner and Scully that the government has arranged for their investigation to fail in an effort to cover up the truth about American POWs still being kept in Vietnam.

In the present, during the re-dedication ceremony, Mulder realizes that no one can see Teager if they are in his line of sight. Teager follows Skinner and Bloch to the motorcade, where he unsuccessfully shoots at the general and Skinner suffers a flesh wound. Teager is shot in turn by the agents as he tries to escape. As he succumbs to his wounds, Teager repeats his Army identification. Afterwards, the Pentagon states that the assassin was a different person—which Mulder denounces as a lie. He leaves Skinner to silently ponder his own service in the war as he looks upon Teager's name on the memorial wall.

== Production ==
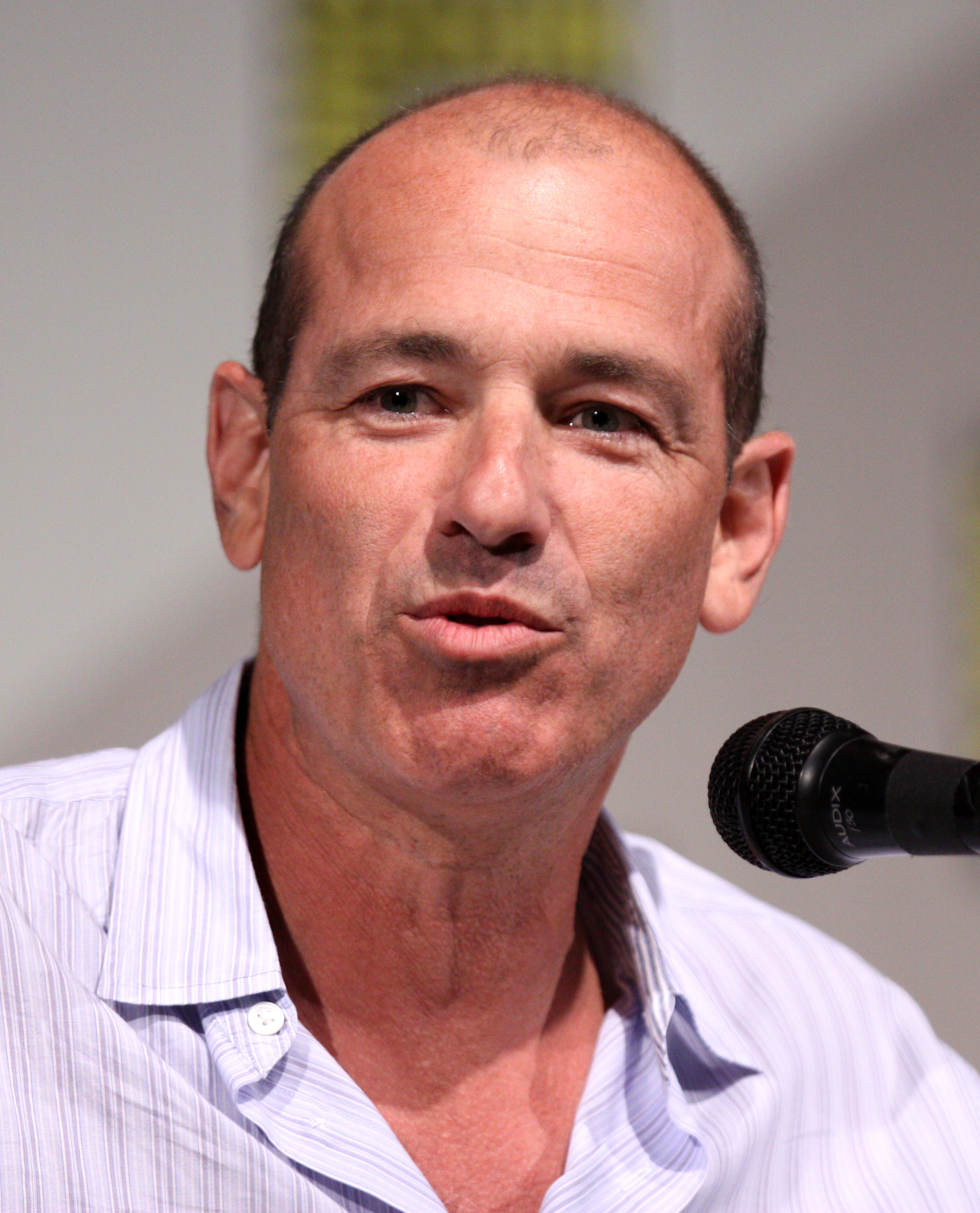
Howard Gordon was inspired to write "Unrequited" after viewing an episode of 60 Minutes about American secret agents that were left behind during the Vietnam War.

During the show's fourth season, episode co-writer Howard Gordon was slated to pen only one episode, the nineteenth entry "Synchrony". However, after hearing rumors about American CIA agents left behind during the Vietnam War, he started to develop what would become the story for "Unrequited". The day before the show's 1996 Christmas break, Howard approached series creator Chris Carter and co-executive producer Frank Spotnitz and told them about his new episode idea. The project was green-lit, but Howard struggled with breaking the story, necessitating Carter heavily assisting him (thus their shared writing credits).

Gordon had long been interested in writing an antagonist who could turn invisible, but he struggled with finding a scientific mechanism to explain this plot point. Eventually, Gordon discussed the struggle with his ophthalmologist brother, who told about blind spots in the human eye. Gordon noted, "These stories come from scientific research ... So I said, what if someone could actually create a field of vision where none actually exists?" Gordon decided to make the antagonist a Vietnam War veteran because "they are getting old, and like the Holocaust survivor [in] 'Kaddish', starting to die". This storyline also allowed Gordon the chance to give Vietnam veteran Walter Skinner a larger role—a chance that Gordon relished.

The episode featured a replica of the Vietnam Veterans Memorial, of which only a portion was real (the rest being filled in with CGI). Due to legal restrictions, the replica featured fake names, chosen by the sister of art assistant Kristina Lyne; the wall also included the names of The X-Files cast and crew, as well as noted writer Harlan Ellison, and model Jessica Hahn. For day scenes, the replica and an accompanying grandstand were erected in Vancouver's Jericho Park due to the locale's "expansive, groomed, flat" characteristics, whereas night scenes were filmed in a large warehouse in Ballantyne Pier. This move required the production crew to dismantle and cart the grandstand from Jericho Park to the warehouse. The crowd used to film the memorial's reinauguration scene comprised 500 extras, who were multiplied in post-production with CGI technology. Fifty of these individuals had won the opportunity to appear on the show in local radio contests.

Stanley Park doubled as Freedom Plaza. Because the park is public and operated by the Vancouver Park Board, city police cannot deny anyone access. This caused something of an issue when members of the paparazzi tried to photograph Anderson. Consequently, many of the available crew and production staff members formed a "human blockade", thereby blocking the photographers and protecting their co-star.

== Reception ==
"Unrequited" premiered on the Fox network on February 23, 1997. This episode earned a Nielsen rating of 10.9, with a 16 share, meaning that roughly 10.9 percent of all television-equipped households, and 16 percent of households watching television, were tuned in to the episode. "Unrequited" was seen by 16.56 million viewers on first broadcast. The episode first aired in the United Kingdom on January 7, 1998, on BBC One.

Emily VanDerWerff of The A.V. Club gave the episode a "B−". She wrote that "Unrequited" "isn't a very good episode" of the series, but that it is "a potent one all the same" due to its "great ideas" that are unfortunately never expanded upon. VanDerWerff felt that the episode's biggest problem was that it started in media res and revealed the episode's conclusion, writing "it's a pretty great starting point for an episode. Instead, it's actually the endpoint". Despite the negativity towards the plot, she wrote that the entry was "a good episode for Skinner" in that it gives him a mission and hints at his past without being heavy-handed. Furthermore, VanDerWerff also applauded the way the show used the Vietnam War in a way that felt "fresh".

Robert Shearman, in his book Wanting to Believe: A Critical Guide to The X-Files, Millennium & The Lone Gunmen, rated the episode two stars out of five. The author heavily criticized the episode for taking place before the events of "Memento Mori", circumventing the need to deal with Scully's cancer. Furthermore, he criticized the episode for being "thin stuff" and heavily padded; Shearman note that the long teaser is replayed in the episode "to no new dramatic effect" and that Covarrubias's appearance offers no new information. Paula Vitaris, writing for Cinefantastique, rated "Unrequited" one star out of four, writing that it "collapses under the weight of its message" and that it "fails to bring to life any of its guest characters". Furthermore, she criticized the reusing of the teaser, noting that it "just comes off as a writer's device".

== Bibliography ==
- Gradnitzer, Louisa; Pittson, Todd (1999). X Marks the Spot: On Location with The X-Files. Arsenal Pulp Press. ISBN 1-55152-066-4.
- Hurwitz, Matt; Knowles, Chris (2008). The Complete X-Files. Insight Editions. ISBN 978-1-933784-80-9.
- Meisler, Andy (1998). I Want to Believe: The Official Guide to the X-Files Volume 3. Harper Prism. ISBN 0-06-105386-4.
- Shearman, Robert (2009). Wanting to Believe: A Critical Guide to The X-Files, Millennium & The Lone Gunmen. Mad Norwegian Press. ISBN 978-0-9759446-9-1.
