= Peter Greene =

American actor (1959–2025)

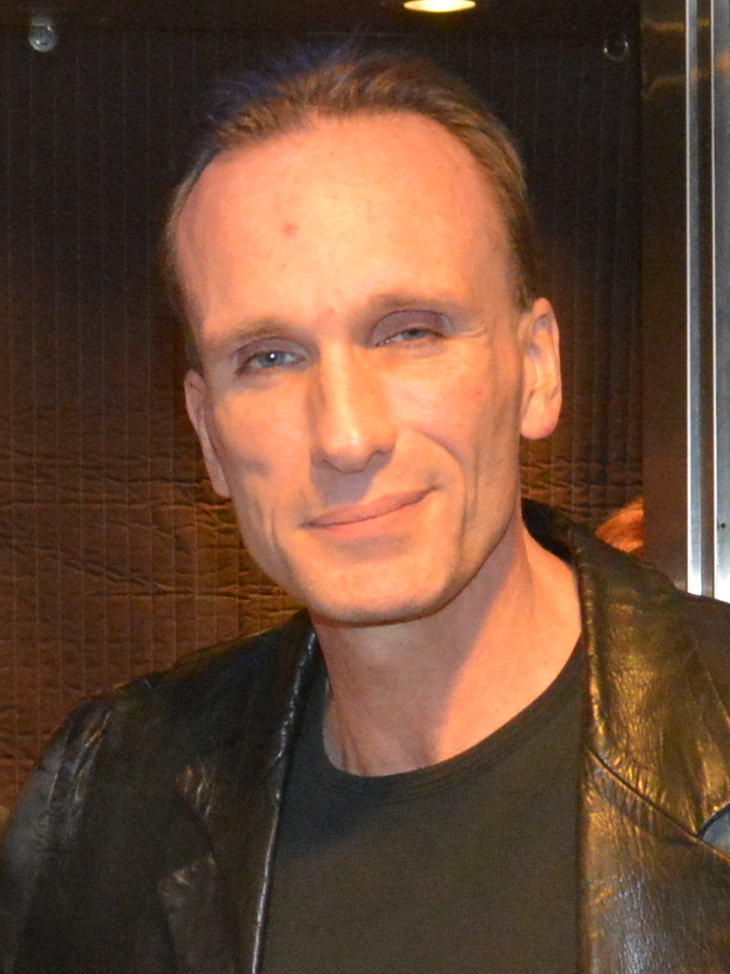
- Greene in 2014
- Born: Peter Paul Green III; May 10, 1959 or October 8, 1965; Philadelphia, Pennsylvania, U.S.
- Died: December 12, 2025; New York City, New York, U.S.
- Occupation: Actor
- Years active: 1990–2025
- Height: 189 cm (6 ft 2 in)
- Children: 1

Peter Greene (né Green; May 10, 1959 or October 8 1965 – December 12, 2025) was an American actor. A character actor, he was generally known for portraying villains, corrupt police officers, and criminals. He began his acting career in 1990, landing small roles in television and film with his film debut being Laws of Gravity. He had major roles in Pulp Fiction, The Mask, and The Usual Suspects in 1994 and 1995.

Greene's other credits included Judgment Night (1993), Clean, Shaven (1994), Under Siege 2: Dark Territory (1995). He later appeared in Kiss & Tell (1997), Blue Streak (1999), Training Day (2001), The Black Donnellys (2007), Life on Mars (2009), New York New York (2016), and The Continental (2023). He had over a hundred film and television credits throughout his career.

He had issues with drug addiction throughout his life. He died unexpectedly at age 60 (or aged 66) from an accidental self-inflicted gunshot wound.

== Early life ==
Peter Paul Green III was born in Philadelphia, Pennsylvania to Peter Paul Green Jr. and Patricia Ann Fitzgerald. He has a younger brother, John and a younger sister, Marianne. In his youth, he was a choirboy at his local Catholic church. He was a student at Montclair High School. However, he ran away from home at the age of 15 and was homeless for a few years. He had dropped out of high school and lived in New York working various odd jobs including as a busboy. It was during this time that he was introduced to both using and selling hard drugs.

He did not pursue a career in acting until his mid-20s. It was then that he studied at the Lee Strasberg Theatre & Film Institute in New York City and studied method acting.

== Career ==
When registering for the Screen Actors Guild, he decided to change the spelling of his name to "Peter Greene". He initially landed several small roles in cinema and television in the early 1990s. His television debut was on the NBC crime drama Hardball in 1990. Greene later made his film debut in Laws of Gravity (1992). During the production of the film Judgement Night, he was found with a crack pipe. He played the schizophrenic Peter Winter in Clean, Shaven (1993). In Pulp Fiction, Greene appeared as a security guard named Zed. The character of Zed is meant to pay homage to the 1972 film Deliverance. The Mask was a film starring Jim Carrey, where Greene played the villainous Dorian Tyrell. Greene played the character for the majority of the film, however towards the end Tyrell himself puts on the magical mask that grants him magical abilities, where the character is then played alternatively by actor Garret T. Sato and stuntman Jeep Swenson.

The Usual Suspects saw him play the character of Redfoot. Greene often played villains, such as in Judgment Night (1993), Under Siege 2: Dark Territory (1995), The Rich Man's Wife (1996), Training Day (2001) (as a corrupt narcotics officer), and The Bounty Hunter (2010).

Greene worked with director Jordan Alan twice: once on the film Kiss & Tell (1997), a dark comic turn and then again four years later in The Gentleman Bandit (aka Gentleman B). After Greene's arrests in 1998 for drug related crimes, Alan had to put the actor through rehab to get him through the second film and eventually, after coming upon Greene doing heroin with Mike Starr, he was forced to replace Greene's voice because of the vocal problems caused by drugs. Despite these problems, Alan vouched for Greene to producer Tobe Jaffe for the movie Blue Streak, in which Greene played Martin Lawrence's nemesis.

Greene continued to work mostly as a character actor. He appeared in the short-lived television dramas The Black Donnellys and Life on Mars (2009). He also appeared as a policeman in Prodigy and Mobb Deep's video for "A, B, C's", as well as the focal character in House of Pain's video for "Fed Up". Greene appeared in the opening scene of the premiere of the FX series Justified where he was characterized as a "thuggish Peter Weller lookalike" by reviewer Scott Tobias, writing for The A.V. Club. His later roles included the film New York New York (2016) and the miniseries The Continental (2023). He appeared in two films by director Eric Brian Hughes: Turnabout (2016) and Exit 0 (2019). Greene appears in the digital series The Jersey Connection by filmmaker Tim Firtion. Greene was featured in the 2020 TV series For Life in a small role as an Aryan Brother named "Wild Bill" Miller.

By the time of his death, he had been given a role in an upcoming Mickey Rourke movie called Mascots, and was involved in at least two other projects. He was also working on and planned to narrate a documentary on USAID titled From the American People: The Withdrawal of USAID which had been funded via GoFundMe.

== Personal life and death ==
Greene had one son. He struggled with heroin and cocaine addiction in the 1990s and additionally he was arrested for possessing crack cocaine in 2007. He also attempted to take his own life in March 1996 which he revealed in an interview with Premier magazine. After the attempt, he successfully sought addiction treatment.

Greene died at his Lower East Side apartment in Manhattan, New York City, on December 12, 2025, at the age of 66. Police were called to perform a wellness check after music had been playing for a full day in the apartment. The neighbor who discovered Greene's body revealed to the New York Daily News that Greene was found "lying on the floor, face down, facial injury and blood". The day he was found by police he was to undergo a medical procedure to remove a benign tumor from his body. A note was also confirmed to be found where Greene claimed "I'm still a Westie." In February 2026, the cause of death was declared an accidental self-inflicted gunshot wound to the left axilla causing injury of the brachial artery.

== Filmography ==
=== Film ===
Year	Title	Role	Notes
1992	Laws of Gravity	Jimmy	
1993	Clean, Shaven	Peter Winter	
1993	Judgment Night	Sykes	
1994	Pulp Fiction	Zed	
1994	The Mask	Dorian Tyrell	
1995	The Usual Suspects	Redfoot The Fence	Uncredited
1995	Bang	Adam	
1995	Under Siege 2: Dark Territory	Mercenary #1	
1996	Lowball	John	
1996	Coyote Run	Clifton Santier	
1996	The Rich Man's Wife	Cole Wilson	
1996	Snakeland	Johnny	Short film
1997	Trading Favors	Teddy	
1997	Double Tap	Nash	
1997	Kiss & Tell	Detective John Finnigan	
1998	Permanent Midnight	Gus	
1999	Out in Fifty	Tony Grayson	
1999	Blue Streak	Deacon	
2000	Shadow Hours	Detective Steve Andrianson	
2001	Nobody's Baby	Vern	
2001	Ticker	Detective Artie Pluchinsky	
2001	Training Day	Jeff	Uncredited
2001	Scenes of the Crime	Rick	
2001	Dead Dogs Lie	Marcus Devlin	
2002	The Gentleman Bandit	Manny Breen	
2002	Under the Influence	Stephen Tally	
2004	Black Cloud	Norm Olsen	
2005	Confession	Detective William Fletcher	
2005	Brothers in Arms	Bert	
2006	End Game	Jack Baldwin	Direct-to-video
2006	Love Hollywood Style	Theodor Caruso	
2007	Final Engagement	Priest	Direct-to-video
2007	I'm Calling Frank	Bobby	
2008	Clown	Clown	Short film
2009	Blue Knight	Sergeant Donato	Short film
2009	Forget Me Not	Boyfriend	Short film
2009	Fist of the Warrior	John Lowe	Direct-to-video
2010	Caller ID	Dean of Admissions	
2010	The Bounty Hunter	Earl Mahler	
2010	Earthling	Swinnert	
2010	Once Fallen	Sonny	
2010	Once More	Jack	Short film
2011	Keep Your Enemies Closer	Alex Decker	Short film
2011	A Pornstar Is Born	Ron Goldman	Direct-to-video
2011	The Grasslands	Baby John	
2011	Shanghai Hotel	Mr. Capuzzi	
2012	The Shoemaker	Dutchie	Short film
2012	Brutal	Carlo Morello	
2012	The Kill Hole	Peter Krebbs	
2012	The Child	Martin Engler	
2013	Checkmate, Keep Your Enemies Closer	Alex Decker	Short film
2015	Sweet Lorraine	Marcus	
2016	Turnabout	Leo	
2016	New York New York	Downey	
2018	City of Lies	Commander Fasulo	
2019	Exit 0	The Writer	
2019	Samir	Valentine	
2020	Tesla	Nichols	
2020	Let's Get Lost	Ray	Short film
2020	Priceless	The Devil	Short film
2021	Body Brokers	Dr. Riner	
2021	Return to Danger	Gilbert	
2022	The Crusaders	Hughie	Short film
2022	Out of Exile	Whitman Rader	
2022	The Mick and the Trick	Patrick Shannon	
2023	Little Dixie	Karl Roach	
2023	Pet Shop Days	The Dealer	
2025	Beggarman	Vinny	
2026	Clika	Lieutenant Jones	Posthumous release

=== Television ===
Year	Title	Role	Notes
1990	Hardball	Unknown Role	Episode: "Prescription for Murder"
1992	As the World Turns	Hitman	Episode: "Episode #1.9169" & "#1.9170"
1998	Black Cat Run	D.J. Wheeler	Television film
2001	Law & Order	Francis "Taz" Partell	Episode: "Bronx Cheer"
2005	H. G. Wells' War of the Worlds	Matt Herbert	Television film
2006	Dead and Deader	Dr. Scott	Television film
2007	The Black Donnellys	Derek Timothy "Dokey" Farrell	Main cast
2009	Life on Mars	Jimmy McManus	Recurring cast
2010	Justified	Thomas Francis "Tommy Bucks" Buckley	Episode: "Fire in the Hole"
2012	Hawaii Five-0	Rick Peterson	Episode: "Mai Ka Wa Kahiko (Out of the Past)"
2016	Chicago P.D.	Rory Jensen	Recurring cast: season 3
2017	Still the King	Hank "The Shank"	Recurring cast: season 2
2020	For Life	Bill "Wild Bill" Miller	Recurring cast: season 1
2021	The Jersey Connection	Jordan Blaine	Episode: "Prologue: Time Destroys Everything"
2023	The Continental: From the World of John Wick	Uncle Charlie	Episode: "Brothers in Arms"

=== Music videos ===
Year	Artist	Song	Role
1996	House of Pain	"Fed Up"	Mechanic
2008	Prodigy	"ABC"	Detective
2017	Necro	"Dead Body Disposal"	Killer
2019	Jadakiss	"Me"	Bank Robber
2022	R.A. the Rugged Man	"Dragon Fire"	Big Boss
