= Balthazar (TV series) =

French crime-thriller drama television series

- Genre: Drama; Thriller
- Created by: Clothilde Jamin and Clélia Constantine
- Written by: Clothilde Jamin; Clélia Constantine; Nicolas Clément
- Screenplay by: Clothilde Jamin; Clélia Constantine; Nicolas Clément; Soiliho Bodin; Chloé Glachant
- Directed by: Vincent Jamain; Franck Brett; Jérémy Minui; Mona Achache; Frédéric Berthe; Camille Delamarre; David Lanzmann; Nicolas Capus; Tomer Sisley
- Starring: Tomer Sisley and Hélène de Fougerolles
- Composer: Alexandre Fortuit
- Country of origin: France
- Original language: French
- No. of seasons: 5
- No. of episodes: 38

Production
- Producers: Clothilde Jamin; Stéphane Marsil
- Cinematography: Isarr Eiriksson; Pierre Baboin; Benjamin Louet; Jean-Philippe Gosselin; William Watterlot; Delphine Desbruères; David Quesemand
- Editors: Bertrand Maillard; Gaétan Boussand; Pascal Jauffrès; Aïn Varet; Christophe Pinel
- Running time: 50 minutes

Original release
- Network: La Une / TF1
- Release: November 20, 2018 – February 2, 2023

Balthazar is a French crime-thriller drama television series created by Clothilde Jamin and Clélia Constantine, first broadcast in Belgium on 20 November 2018, on La Une, and in France from 6 December 2018 to 2 February 2023, on TF1. The series was renewed for a fifth and final season in 2022, which premiered in 2023.

It was one of the 10 highest-rated dramas in France in 2018.

== Plot ==
Raphaël Balthazar, the most gifted forensic pathologist of his generation, knows how to make the dead speak. He imagines the ghosts of the deceased people he has seen, asking them questions about how they would have died, their private lives, or what they should do. He becomes the teammate of police commander Hélène Bach (played by Hélène de Fougerolles). Both face the most complex murder investigations while he secretly tries to solve the murder of a person close to him. In the fourth season, Hélène gets a promotion and goes to the French Islands. Her place is occupied by Captain Camille Costes, Balthazar's one-stand date.

== Main cast ==
Forensic Institute

- Tomer Sisley: Forensic pathologist Raphaël Balthazar
- Philypa Phoenix: Fatim Saghi
- Côme Levin: Eddy Drouhot
- Caterina Murino: Olivia Vésinet (S4–5)

Office de Police Judiciaire (OPJ)

- Hélène de Fougerolles: Captain Hélène Bach (S1–3)
- Yannig Samot: Lieutenant Jérôme Delgado
- Constance Labbé: Captain Camille Costes (S4–5)

Raphaël Balthazar family

- Pauline Cheviller: Lise, partner of Balthazar murdered by a serial killer

Hélène Bach family

- Aliocha Itovich: Antoine Bach, husband of Hélène (S1–3)
- Gabriel Caballero: Hugo Bach, son of Hélène (S1–3)
- Aminthe Audiard: Manon Bach, daughter of Hélène (S1–3)

Season 5

- Hugo Bardin: Palom

== Adaptation ==
An English-language adaptation Winter starring Richard Armitage and Annabel Scholey is scheduled to broadcast on ITV in the UK in 2026.
