= Louise Brealey =

British actress (born 1979)

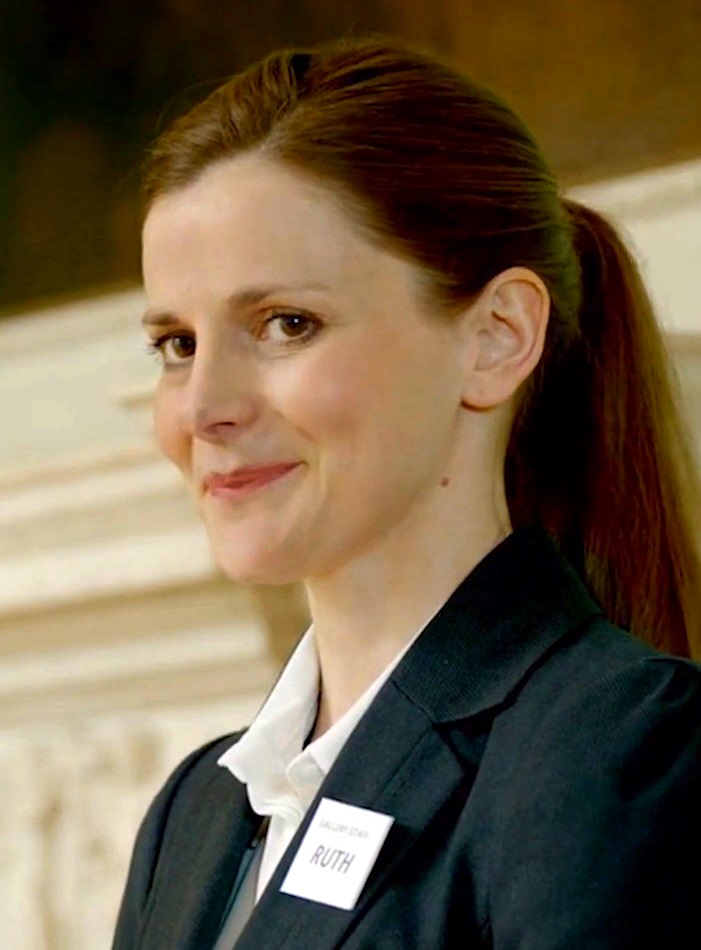
- Brealey in 2014
- Born: 27 March 1979 (age 47); Bozeat, Northamptonshire, England
- Education: University of Cambridge; École Philippe Gaulier; Lee Strasberg Institute
- Occupations: Actress, writer, journalist
- Years active: 2001–present
- Partner: Ferdinand Kingsley (2012–present)

Louise Brealey (born 27 March 1979), also credited as Loo Brealey, is an English actress, writer and journalist. She played Molly Hooper in Sherlock, Cass in Back, Scottish professor Jude McDermid in Clique and Gillian Chamberlain in A Discovery of Witches.

On stage, Brealey has received widespread critical acclaim for starring in productions at the Royal National Theatre, Royal Court Theatre, the Young Vic, and the Bristol Old Vic, directed by Sir Peter Hall and Marianne Elliott.

== Early life and education ==
Brealey was born in Bozeat, Northamptonshire. She won a scholarship for Kimbolton School and went on to read history at Girton College, Cambridge. She later trained with Philippe Gaulier at École Philippe Gaulier in London and the Lee Strasberg Institute in New York City.

== Career ==
=== Writing ===
Brealey has written on cinema, art and music since her teens, contributing reviews and features for magazines including Premiere UK, Empire, SKY, The Face, Neon and Total Film. She is the editor of Anarchy and Alchemy: The Films of Alejandro Jodorowsky (Creation Books, 2007). Until April 2009, Brealey was the deputy editor of Wonderland magazine. A freelance Associate Producer, she has written documentary pitches for BBC Arts. In 2013 her first play Pope Joan was performed by the National Youth Theatre. Her monologue Go Back To Where You Came From was performed as part of Paines Plough Theatre's Come To Where I'm From project in 2018.

=== Acting ===
==== Screen ====
Brealey made her TV debut as Nurse Roxanne Bird in two series of BBC drama Casualty before playing Judy Smallweed in Bleak House. Terry Wogan took Judy and her snaggle-toothed grandfather Smallweed (Phil Davis) to heart, regaling Radio 2 listeners with regular renditions of Davis' catchphrase "Shake me up, Judy!". Brealey followed Bleak House with a comic turn as Anorak, Alistair MacGowan's black-bobbed sidekick, in comedy drama Mayo, described by The Hollywood Reporter as "Agatha Christie does Moonlighting".

Brealey plays pathologist Molly Hooper in all four series of Steven Moffat and Mark Gatiss's television drama, Sherlock.

Brealey is often asked to work in accents, playing a doughty Yorkshire doctor in Ripper Street, a Cockney ne'er-do-well in Law & Order: UK, a broken Geordie widow in Inspector George Gently and a ball-breaking Edinburgh academic in Clique.

Brealey played a leading role in the ITV drama The Widow, first broadcast in March 2019.

In 2023, Brealey starred in the BBC sitcom Such Brave Girls as a dysfunctional single mother, and co-starred alongside Annabel Scholey in the romantic musical film Chuck Chuck Baby.

==== Stage ====
Her stage debut was at London's Royal Court in 2001 as 14-year-old Sophie in Max Stafford-Clark's production of Judy Upton's Sliding With Suzanne. The Daily Telegraph called her performance "a perfect poignant study of adolescence".

Her portrayal of child prodigy Thomasina in the Bristol Old Vic production of Tom Stoppard's Arcadia in 2005 was described by The Daily Telegraph as "the evening belongs to Loo Brealey's Thomasina".

Brealey worked twice with Sir Peter Hall. First in 2007 on Simon Gray's Little Nell, in which she played the title role opposite Michael Pennington and Tim Pigott-Smith. Based on The Invisible Woman, Claire Tomalin's award-winning biography of Charles Dickens's mistress Ellen Ternan, Little Nell followed Ternan's story from 17 to 44 years of age. Critics described Brealey's work as "impressive" (The Stage), "highly compelling" (The Independent) and "astounding" (British Theatre Guide). The following year, Hall cast her as Sonya in his critically acclaimed Uncle Vanya, the inaugural production at London's Rose Theatre. The Telegraph called hers "a name to watch" and The Independent compared her to Joan Fontaine in Rebecca. Lloyd Evans, in his review for The Spectator, wrote:

Brealey uncovers the pathetic poetry beneath the indolent superficialities. Her big disadvantage is that she's too attractive for 'plain' Sonya, but she disguises this by suggesting a lack of sexual allure with awkward giggles, squirrelly movements and a stupefied beaming naivety. All brilliantly done.

In 2011 Brealey was the sex-mad, short-frocked daughter of Julian Barratt and Doon Mackichan at the Young Vic in Richard Jones's Government Inspector. She next played three lead roles – Cassandra, Andromache and Helen of Troy – in Caroline Bird's production of The Trojan Women at London's Gate Theatre. The Times called her performances "electrifying" and The Guardian said she "pulled off a remarkable treble". Brealey talked about the roles in the Evening Standard and wrote a piece for The Times about the experience of going naked on stage, which went viral.

In February 2014 she starred as Julie in August Strindberg's Miss Julie at the Citizens Theatre in Glasgow.

For her 2015 performance as Marianne in Constellations, at The Lowry in Salford, she won the Manchester Theatre Award for Best Actress in a Visiting Production. She played the lead alongside Anne Marie Duff in Marianne Elliott's Husbands and Sons at the National Theatre.

==== Audio ====
Brealey is the narrator of Caitlin Moran's How to Build a Girl and its sequel How to Be Famous, Alex Michaelides' The Silent Patient, Kate Mosse's Number One Bestseller Labyrinth and Hallie Rubenhold's The Five: The Untold Lives of the Women Killed by Jack the Ripper. She voiced Josie in the audiobook of Lisa Jewel's novel, None of This is True. She was Megan in the audiobook edition of The Girl on The Train by Paula Hawkins, which won the 2016 Audie Award for Audiobook of the Year.

==== Radio ====
Brealey voiced the part of Laura Willowes in the 2021 BBC Radio 4 adaptation of Lolly Willowes.

== Personal life ==
Brealey has been in a relationship with actor Ferdinand Kingsley, son of Ben Kingsley, since they met when he saw her playing Helen of Troy, in a 2012 production of The Trojan Women.

== Filmography ==
=== Film ===
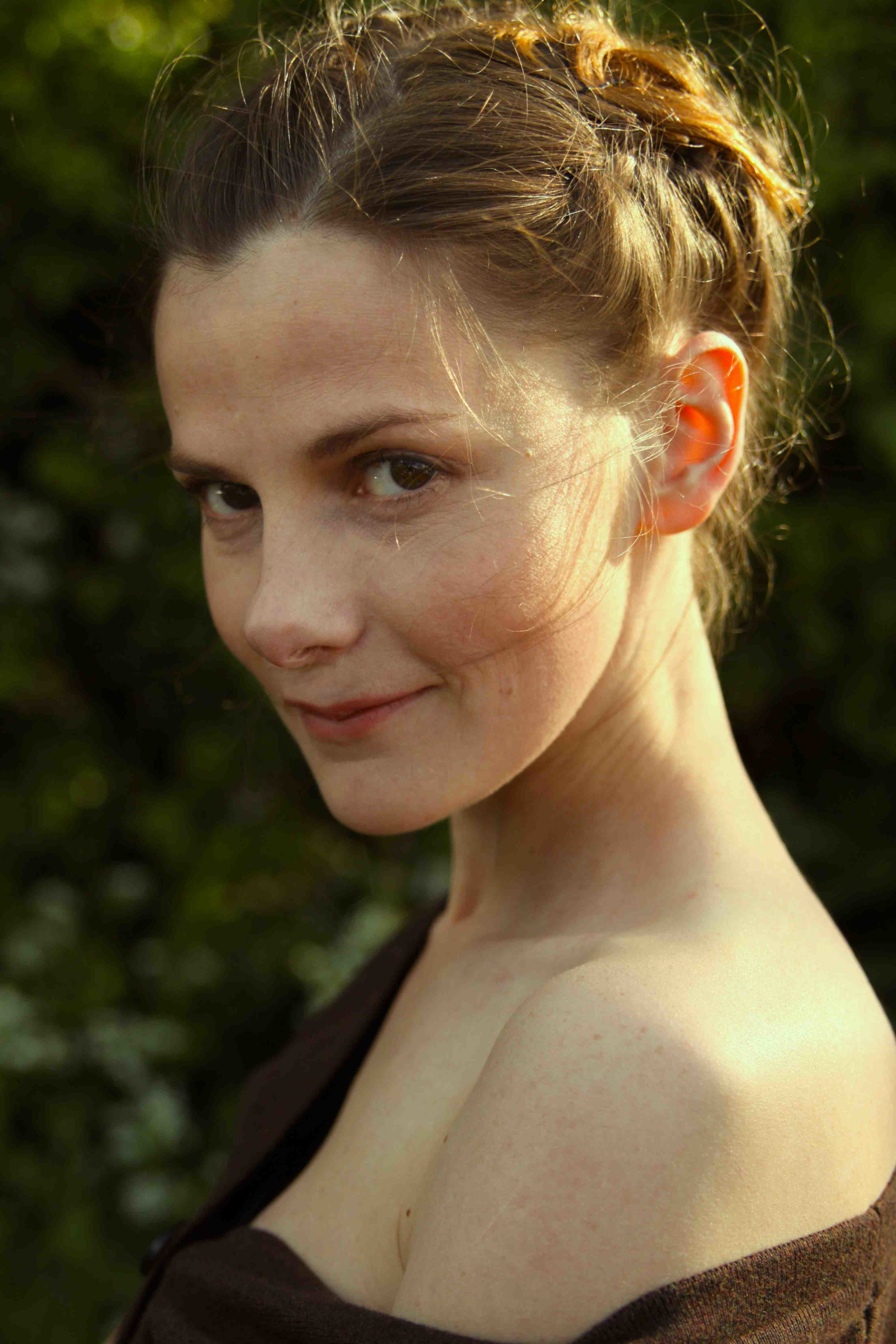
Brealey in 2009

Year	Title	Role	Notes
2000	Boy Meets Girl	Susan	Short film
2003	The Tooth Faerie		Short film
2007	I Want You	Girl	Short film
2010	Reuniting the Rubins	Miri Rubins	
2011	The Best Exotic Marigold Hotel	Hairdresser	
2013	Delicious	Stella	
2014	Heard	Ruth	Short film
2015	Containment	Sally	
2018	In Wonderland	Alice	Short film
2019	Nobody's Son	Susan Thompson	Short film
2020	Limbo	Hannah Peyton	Short film
2022	Brian and Charles	Hazel	
2022	Deep Clean	Maddie	Short film
2023	Chuck Chuck Baby	Helen	

=== Television ===
Key
†	Denotes television productions that have not yet been released

Year	Title	Role	Notes
2002–2004	Casualty	Roxanne Bird	Series regular (seasons 16–19)
2005	Bleak House	Judy	Serial, recurring role
2005	The English Harem	Suzy	TV movie
2006	Mayo	Anorak	Main cast
2007	Green	Abi	TV movie
2008	Hotel Babylon	Chloe McCourt	1 episode
2010–2017	Sherlock	Molly Hooper	Recurring role (series 1), main cast (series 2–4, TV special)
2011	Law & Order: UK	Joanne Vickery	Episode: "Tick Tock"
2012	The Charles Dickens Show	Various	Recurring role
2013	Father Brown	Eleanor Knight	Episode: "The Mayor and the Magician"
2014	Ripper Street	Amelia Frayn	Main cast (series 3)
2015	Inspector George Gently	Jo Parker	Episode: "Gently Among Friends"
2015	Birthday	Natasha	TV movie
2016	All Good Things	Joanne	Episode: "Stupid"
2017	Clique	Jude McDermid	Main cast (series 1)
2017–2021	Back	Cassandra Leslie "Cass" Nichols	Main cast
2018	A Discovery of Witches	Gillian Chamberlain	Main cast (series 1)
2019	The Widow	Beatrix	Recurring role
2019	Gomorrah	Leena	1 episode
2020	Death in Paradise	Donna Harman	Episode: "A Murder in Portrait"
2020	Exile	Sarah Hargreaves	Main cast
2023	Lockwood & Co.	Pamela Joplin	Recurring role
2023	Such Brave Girls	Deb	Main cast
2025	Shetland	Isobel Jameson	Supporting role (series 10)
2026	Harry Potter †	Madam Hooch	Post-production

== Theatre ==
List of roles in theatre
Year	Title	Role	Director	Theatre
2001	Sliding with Suzanne	Sophie	Max Stafford-Clark	Royal Court Theatre
2005	Arcadia	Thomasina	Rachel Kavanaugh	Bristol Old Vic
2006	After the End	Louise	Roxana Silbert	US and Russian tour, Off-Broadway
2007	Little Nell	Nell	Peter Hall	Theatre Royal, Bath
2008	Uncle Vanya	Sonya	Peter Hall	Rose Theatre, Kingston
2008	Pornography	Actor 7	Sean Holmes	Traverse Theatre
2009	The Stone	Hannah	Ramin Gray	Royal Court Theatre
2009	The Ones That Flutter	Julie Ray	Abbey Wright	Theatre503
2010	Country Music	Lynsey	Lisa Blair & Eleanor While	West Yorkshire Playhouse
2011	Government Inspector	Mayor's daughter	Richard Jones	Young Vic
2012	The Trojan Women	Cassandra/Andromache/Helen of Troy	Christopher Haydon	Gate Theatre (London)
2013	The Herd	Claire	Howard Davies	Bush Theatre
2014	Miss Julie	Miss Julie	Dominic Hill	Citizens Theatre
2014	Letters Live			Hay Festival, Wales
2015	Letters Live			Freemasons' Hall
2015	Husbands & Sons	Minnie Gascoigne	Marianne Elliott	Co-production between National Theatre, London and Royal Exchange, Manchester
