= Chris Ryan's Strike Back =

- Blu-ray cover for the series.
- No. of episodes: 6

Release
- Original network: Sky1
- Original release: 5 May – 19 May 2010

Series chronology
- Next → Project Dawn

Chris Ryan's Strike Back, also known as Strike Back: Origins on Cinemax, is a six-part British television series based on the novel of the same name written by best-selling author and former soldier of the Special Air Service, Chris Ryan, and is the first series of Strike Back. It was produced by Left Bank Pictures for Sky1. The cast of Strike Back is led by Richard Armitage and Andrew Lincoln, also starring Orla Brady, Shelley Conn, Colin Salmon and Jodhi May, including a variety of guest appearances including Toby Stephens, Ewen Bremner, Dhaffer L'Abidine, Shaun Parkes and Alexander Siddig. The series follows John Porter (Armitage), a former British Special Forces soldier, who is drafted back into service by Section 20, a fictional branch of the Defence Intelligence (DI) of the Ministry of Defence.

The series ran on a multi-million pound budget, and was filmed on location in South Africa, particularly in Gauteng. Ryan became a series consultant. Strike Back commenced airing on 5 May 2010 with two episodes showing a week. The first episode received unofficial overnight ratings of almost 400,000 viewers in the United Kingdom, which increased to just over one million according to the more highly regarded Broadcasters' Audience Research Board. It was met with generally positive reviews; comments of the series ranged from a positive "British action series that packs a Die Hard-style thrill around every corner," to a more negative "pathetic male fantasy". It was released on DVD and Blu-ray Disc on 7 June 2010.

A 10-part second series, known as Strike Back: Project Dawn, a co-production between Sky and the American network Cinemax, was first broadcast in August 2011. A third series of Strike Back, also consisting of 10 parts, was released in August 2012.

Following success of the second through fourth series, Cinemax began airing the six-part series starting 25 October 2013 in the United States. It is airing as a prequel in the United States since Cinemax aired Strike Back: Project Dawn, Strike Back: Vengeance, and Strike Back: Shadow Warfare prior to the first season.

== Episodes ==
In this table, the number in the first column refers to the episode's number within the entire series, "UK viewers in millions" refers to how many Britons watched the episode on Sky1. The series plays out as three two-part episodes.

No.	Title	Directed by	Written by	U.S. air date	U.S. viewers (millions)	U.K. air date	U.K. viewers (millions)
1	Episode 1	Daniel Percival	Jed Mercurio	25 October 2013	0.259	5 May 2010	1.008
On the eve of the 2003 invasion of Iraq, a Special Forces unit takes part in an operation to release a hostage, weapons contractor Kenneth Bratton, during which, John Porter (Armitage) disarms a boy named As'ad wearing a suicide vest. After the hostage is found, two soldiers are killed and one is left in a vegetative state. Believing the boy was responsible, and that Porter did not kill him, he is dishonourably discharged. Fellow officer Hugh Collinson (Lincoln) becomes the head of Section 20 of MI6. Seven years later, journalist Katie Dartmouth (Brady) is kidnapped outside Basra by the "Sword of Islam"; the kidnappers demand the release of one of their comrades from Belmarsh Prison. They chop off Dartmouth's hand over a live video feed. Upon realising one of the kidnappers is As'ad, Collinson "reactivates" Porter. A separate unit is tasked with retrieving Dartmouth after tracking the live feed, but it is a decoy; they are killed when the building rigged with explosives detonates. In the end, Porter goes on his own to the same apartment building during the same operation seven years previous.
2	Episode 2	Daniel Percival	Jed Mercurio	1 November 2013	0.218	5 May 2010	0.803
After capturing a "Sword of Islam" member, Porter persuades him to lead him to where Dartmouth is being held, and then allows himself to be captured. After finding and removing a tracking device on one of his teeth, the terrorists move both hostages to another location. Later, they decide to execute Dartmouth one day sooner after realising the British will not give into their demand. Porter breaks free and kills the kidnappers, whilst As'ad wishes to join them, claiming he knows who killed the soldiers seven years ago. While the trio are pursued by re-enforcements during their escape, the extraction team arrive. Collinson refuses As'ad entry into the helicopter, who is last seen running for his life. When Porter questions Dartmouth about what As'ad said about who killed the soldiers, Dartmouth recalls that it was a British soldier; a flashback reveals that Collinson was the killer.
3	Episode 3	Daniel Percival	Jed Mercurio & Alan Whiting	8 November 2013	0.301	12 May 2010	0.857
Former SAS soldier Felix Masuku (Parkes) assassinates what he believed was Robert Mugabe in Harare, but was in fact a double. He is quickly arrested and sent to a highly secure prison. Not wanting him to stand trial, Section 20 deploys Porter to break Masuku out and kill him before then. Porter travels to Harare posing as a blood diamond dealer and is soon arrested and brought to the same prison. After learning from Leyla Thompson (May) that the trial date is being brought forward, Porter moves his plan forward also. Meanwhile, an anonymous source tips off the escape plan to a Colonel Tshuma. As his men arrive, Porter successfully breaks Masuku out. As he prepares to execute Masuku, he tells Porter he was hired by British intelligence to assassinate Mugabe, but was betrayed by his handler. Believing him, Porter keeps him alive and they plan to escape Zimbabwe.
4	Episode 4	Daniel Percival	Jed Mercurio & Alan Whiting	15 November 2013	0.275	12 May 2010	0.764
Colonel Tshuma leads a manhunt to find the two. After evading his men by jumping into a river, Porter and Masuku search for a telephone to contact Leyla. In the process, they stop a group of raiders intimidating a local orphanage. As they prepare to leave, Masuku pleads with Porter to help the children leave with them. By the time the children leave, Tshuma's men picks up their trail again. Meanwhile, Section 20 learns that the betrayer is the Embassy contact, who was paid $6 million by Mugabe's ministers to frame Masuku. When Collinson travels to South Africa to confront him, the contact commits suicide. Porter and Masuku hold off their position from Thsuma until Collinson and back-up arrive. Tshuma is killed and Masuku disappears. In the end, Porter learns that his ex-wife, Diane, died from complications during cancer surgery.
5	Episode 5	Edward Hall	Robert Murphy	22 November 2013	0.279	19 May 2010	0.890
Computer hacker Gerald Baxter (Ewen Bremner) is responsible for killing several American Marines with a British air strike in Helmand Province, Afghanistan. Porter is ordered to go there posing as a weapons dealer to locate and extract Baxter. Porter is captured by Zahir Sharq (Siddig) and taken to him, who is revealed to be working with the Taliban. Quickly, the two are ambushed and apprehended by Marines. Although Porter reveals his true identity, the Marines receive orders to have the two killed. When Porter and Baxter escape, Baxter reveals he worked with the CIA, but moved with Sharq after learning the Americans want him dead; the two set off to Pakistan to meet Sharq. When they meet him, Baxter reveals Porter's true identity. In the end, Baxter learns that Sharq is working with American liaison to the UK, Frank Arlington (Stephens), and offers the two in exchange for arms and intelligence.
6	Episode 6	Edward Hall	Robert Murphy	29 November 2013	N/A	19 May 2010	0.872
Porter convinces Baxter he is being used and the two manage to escape from Sharq's compound. Porter calls Collinson regarding a pick-up and a deal with Baxter, but they have to return to Afghanistan. When they arrive, a sole Taliban kills Baxter. Collinson confronts Arlington about his deals with Sharq; Arlington readily admits that they are using him as an asset and aiding him to lead the insurgent movement. After Collinson divulges the pick-up point, Arlington contacts Sharq to have his men kill the two. The soldier who was comatose seven years ago dies. When Leyla finds a ballistics match with Collinson's weapon, she confronts and forces him to save Porter at the extraction point. Porter, having learned about his actions, confronts him; Collinson admits that he killed the soldiers because he panicked and mistook them for terrorists. Moments later, they are ambushed by the Taliban. Collinson is mortally wounded while aiding Porter's escape, and uses a grenade to kill the Taliban unit. The episode ends in a cliffhanger, as a Delta force elimination team is given the green light to intercept Porter, who they believe may be headed for Iran.

== Cast and characters ==
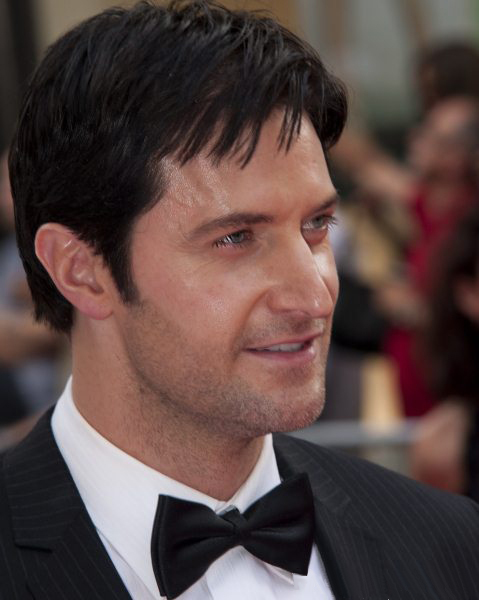
Richard Armitage portrays series protagonist, John Porter.

- Richard Armitage plays series protagonist John Porter. Porter served with the SAS until he was discharged after he spared the life of a boy who was believed to have subsequently killed two soldiers in his unit following a rescue operation the night before the Iraq invasion. He is brought back into service by Section 20 seven years later. He is married to Diane, and has a daughter, Alexandra. Armitage described Porter as a "damaged hero", and "sort of like Lucas North, only on some kind of go-faster drug." In order to fit into the role, Armitage performed a lot of training for about ten weeks in the UK, and then flew to Johannesburg the day after filming the eighth series of Spooks wrapped up, where he proceeded with more training. Armitage had not trained as hard as in the past; the intensity of such training almost made him pass out after the first workout, stating "filming Spooks is demanding, but nowhere near as physical as this." Armitage performed most of his own stunts.
- Andrew Lincoln plays Hugh Collinson, former soldier in Porter's unit and has since become the head of Section 20. Lincoln was signed onto the role because he thought the series was a "great story", and that his character was "completely re-written from the book." Out of the cast, the weapons instructor told Lincoln that he was the most instinctive he ever worked with.
- Orla Brady plays Katie Dartmouth, a British war correspondent who was kidnapped in Basra by the "Sword of Islam", an Iraqi terrorist group. To play Dartmouth, Brady used her inspiration from real life BBC war correspondent Orla Guerin. During the filming of Dartmouth's holding, a male stand-in with a wig was used as a stunt double. The crew also added oil and dirt on Brady's hair every morning. Brady stated that she liked playing extremes, and thought Dartmouth is "grown up" compared to Siobhan Dhillion, the character Brady portrayed in Mistresses.
- Shelley Conn plays Danni Prendiville, an officer with Section 20. Porter started an affair with her after he was redrafted into service. She signed on for the role because she "thought the concept of the scripts was very clever and once I heard who was involved it didn't take me long to sign up." In researching for her role, Conn had somewhat of a military background since her father and uncle both served in the British Army, and had since had a base understanding of military life.
- Colin Salmon plays James Middleton, a civil servant who sits between the British government and the Ministry of Defence. Salmon previously worked with Sky1 on Hex. He was attracted to the role in Strike Back due to the script being "a page-turner, and they're rare. It's really lovely to sit down to start reading something and then not be able to stop because you have to know what's going to happen next," as well as hearing of who was involved in the project. A member of The Prince's Trust charity, Salmon took the opportunity to visit some of their projects in Soweto while the series was filmed.
- Jodhi May plays Layla Thompson, a lieutenant in military intelligence and works alongside Collinson in Section 20. At first, she came to resent Porter, but starts opening up to him after she grows some distrust towards Collinson. May described Thompson as an "incredibly challenging, assertive and ambitious woman working in a male-dominated field that she's climbed to the top of." She was drawn into appear in the series because of the respect she has with Andy Harries and Left Bank Productions. May knew people who work in the same world her character does, and talked with them to conduct some research into her role, as well as reading on the subject.

The first series was also given a variety of guest appearances. Among them include Nicola Stephenson (Diane Porter), Laura Greenwood (Alexandra Porter), Fenar Mohammed Ali (As'ad), Dhaffer L'Abidine (Hakim Al Nazeri), Shaun Parkes (Felix Masuku), David Harewood (Colonel Tshuma), Toby Stephens (Frank Arlington) and Alexander Siddig (Zahar Sharq).

== Production ==
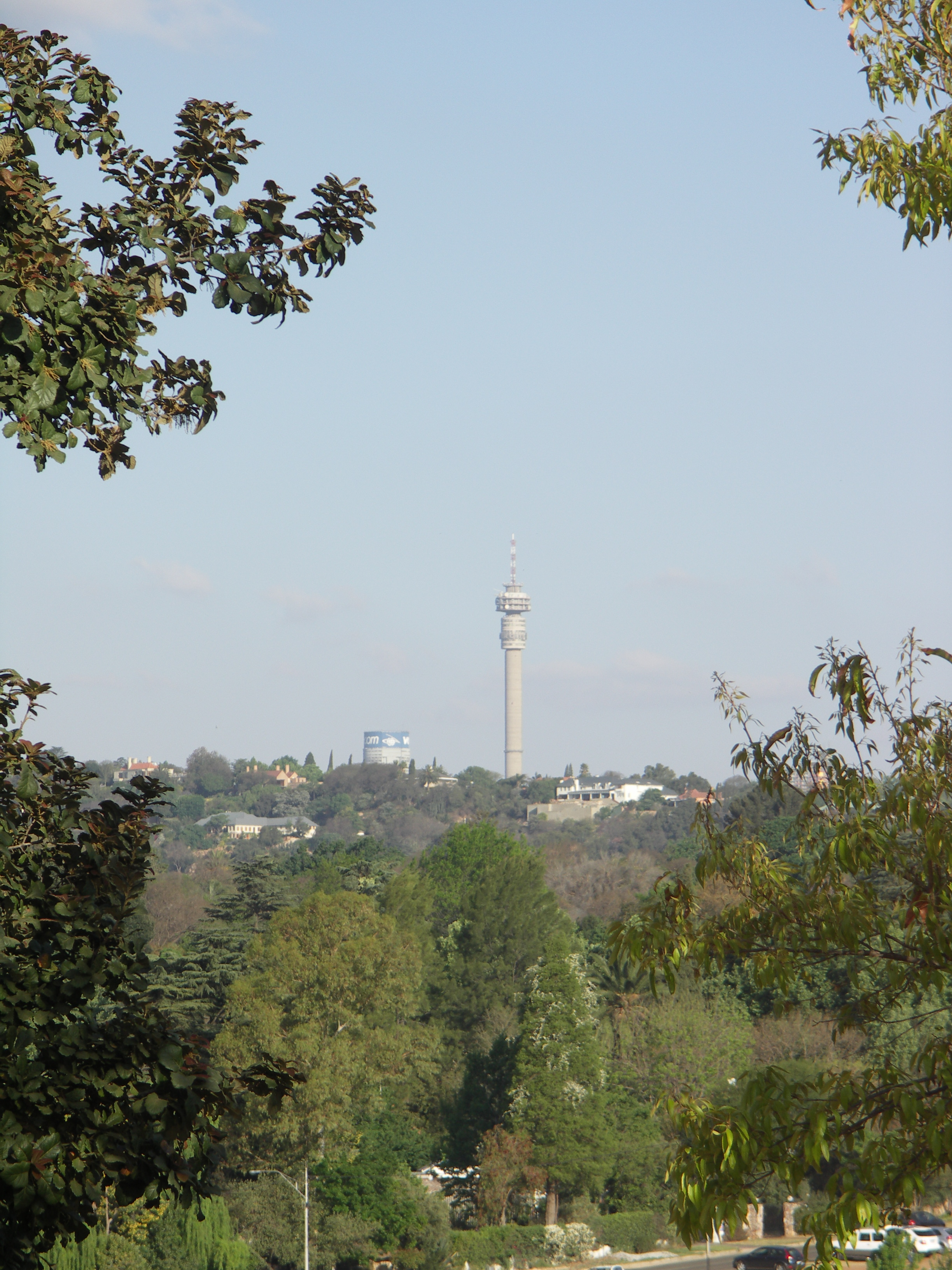
The series was filmed on location in and around Johannesburg, South Africa.

=== Development ===
The inspiration for a television adaptation came when executive producer Andy Harries saw the novel while at an airport and took it on holiday with him. He did not manage to read it before returning to Britain, but pitched the idea to Sky's Head of Drama Elaine Pyke, who commissioned it anyway. Pyke and Harries had enthusiasm for the novel, and were excited to take up the challenge to adapt it for television. It was planned to be shot in high-definition because, according to Pyke; "Sky1 HD drama is about trying to astound audiences, up the creative bar, and commission shows which make audiences love being Sky subscribers." After seeing the success from previous dramas such as Terry Pratchett's Hogfather and The Take, Sky made a multimillion-pound commitment to Strike Back.

Harries commented that he "was interested in developing a quality action series out of the UK because it's something we don't do very often, but there's no reason why we shouldn't." Richard Armitage called the series an "ambitious project for television. But the advantage of that is that these three feature films are linked together so you get a really interesting character arc through all episodes. American television is being brave and doing that at the moment, and this is stepping into that area." Former SAS soldier and the original novel's author, Chris Ryan, served as the series consultant and script advisor. Chris Ryan stated; "When you produce a novel it's like a child and to see it put onto screen opens it up to a greater audience. I class myself as a storyteller now, and to tell that story on paper is a great privilege, then to see it on screen is even better."

=== Preparation ===
As Strike Back is a military drama, the production crew used a vast catalogue of firearms, including side arms, assault and sniper rifles, as well as rocket-propelled grenades, hand grenades and other explosives. Cast members were first taught by carrying weights that mimicked the weight of the weapons so they could get used to carrying it during filming. Later, they were taught how to carry them professionally, including how to disassemble and re-assemble them, as well as how to fire and reload. Though the majority were actually rubber, duplicates were sometimes used for some of the background characters. Three ex-SAS soldiers gave the cast weapons and tactical training, and were also on hand to oversee how cast members carried the weapons during filming sessions.

=== Filming ===
Filming commenced in August 2009, and concluded by the end of the same year. It was filmed on location primarily in the Johannesburg area in South Africa, as well as the same Province the city is located, Gauteng. Other filming locations in the series include Northern Cape, Augrabies Falls National Park, and the Kalahari Desert. Harries wanted to film the series in South Africa because he worked there several times in the past, and knew the country can replicate anywhere in the world.

One of the biggest problems for filming is the environmental impact they would cause, particularly with explosions. Location manager Jaco Espach often coordinated with a special effects team to use more environmentally friendly methods. In order to film sequences involving firearms and explosives in private property, the series crew often negotiated with property owners, as well as notifying all neighbouring properties, local police and the local hospital. In the city, leaflets were distributed to the filming location a week in advance. In airport scenes, the crew would inform the aviation authorities. The action sequences in the beginning of the first episode took five days to shoot, and was filmed in the Johannesburg suburb of Yeoville. On the scenes filmed on the Kalahari, filming temporarily halted due to the spotting of venomous snakes in the area. After they retreated from some rainfall, the crew swept the area to remove them and filming continued.

== Release and reception ==
=== Release and ratings ===
The series aired two episodes a week from 5 to 19 May 2010 in the United Kingdom. BBC Worldwide acquired distribution rights to broadcast the first series internationally. Episodes 1 and 2 received unofficial overnight ratings of 398,000 and 370,000 viewers, with an audience share of 1.7% and 2.1% respectively. Both episodes more than tripled Sky1's average audience share in their slots from the previous three months, and were also the third most-watched non-terrestrial viewing behind BBC Four's Timothy Spall: Somewhere at Sea and a live Sky Sports football game. The overnight figures for episodes 3 and 4 were down somewhat to 337,000 and 294,000 with an audience share of 1.4% and 1.5% respectively. The overnight ratings for the finale episodes were both 386,000 viewers, and received an audience share of 1.7% and 2.3% respectively.

Strike Back was released on both DVD and Blu-ray Disc in the United Kingdom on 7 June 2010. Released by 2entertain, they contain all six episodes, as well as cast interviews and a Behind the Scenes featurette.

=== Critical reception ===
Overall, the reviews of the series were generally positive. Michael Conroy of GQ named Strike Back an "Editor's Pick" for its "excellent cinematography, stellar performances and a surprisingly balanced global perspective makes this story of two former British SAS soldiers a thoroughly enjoyable action romp." Conroy compared the series to Green Zone, The Pacific and the Call of Duty video game series. Keith Watson of Metro called the series a "British action series that packs a Die Hard-style thrill around every corner." Watson praised Armitage's performance, calling him perfect for the role, and that "for once in a British series, the action scenes kick some proper butt." John Preston of The Daily Telegraph stated that Strike Back was "a slick affair, crisply directed by Daniel Percival, scripted with considerable sharpness by Jed Mercurio and full of belting action sequences."

"It's hokum, all right, but polished, watchable hokum. And at least Ross Kemp isn't in it."

— Andrea Mullaney of The Scotsman

Jack Foley of IndieLondon rated the first episodes four stars out of five, stating that it "made for exciting viewing even if the politics and the script sometimes proved laughably gung-ho and naive." On review on the first two episodes, Jane Simon of The Mirror has said that between the cast, "there's enough shock and awe to make you very glad they're showing this in a double bill." Gerard Gilbert of The Arts Desk dubbed Strike Back as "thin and lightweight next to [Armitage's other gig] Spooks", and although "not unexciting", Gilbert did not find the series interesting. Andrea Mullaney of The Scotsman was positive about the casting, and the changes in storyline from the original novel, though the series was aimed "squarely at the blokey viewer who'd rather watch paint dry than a costume drama." Whilst also reviewing Luther and Lewis, John Lloyd of The Financial Times called it "fine for tension," "good on sub-Bond dialogue" and that the story lines make Spooks look true to life. Lloyd also called Richard Armitage "one of the best action men on television."

The Guardian and The Independent have each released two separate reviews; they were more mixed. Sam Wollaston enjoyed the first two episodes, but called it a "pathetic male fantasy." Andrew Anthony has said that "no scene lasted more than about 25 seconds in the first two episodes and no element of plot information was left unspoken. The dialogue is close to pure exposition, with an occasional clunkily macho line thrown in as a concession to dramatic atmosphere. Show, don't tell, say the screenwriting gurus. This was show and tell." From The Independent, Tom Sutcliffe stated the series may be enjoyed by those who like explosions and Spooks-like operations. Rhiannon Harries was almost negative in her review, believing Strike Back was "in almost every respect, a terrible piece of television drama," although part of Harries enjoyed watching it. Harries noted that Luther was more recommended.
