= Richard Armitage (actor) =

British actor (born 1971)

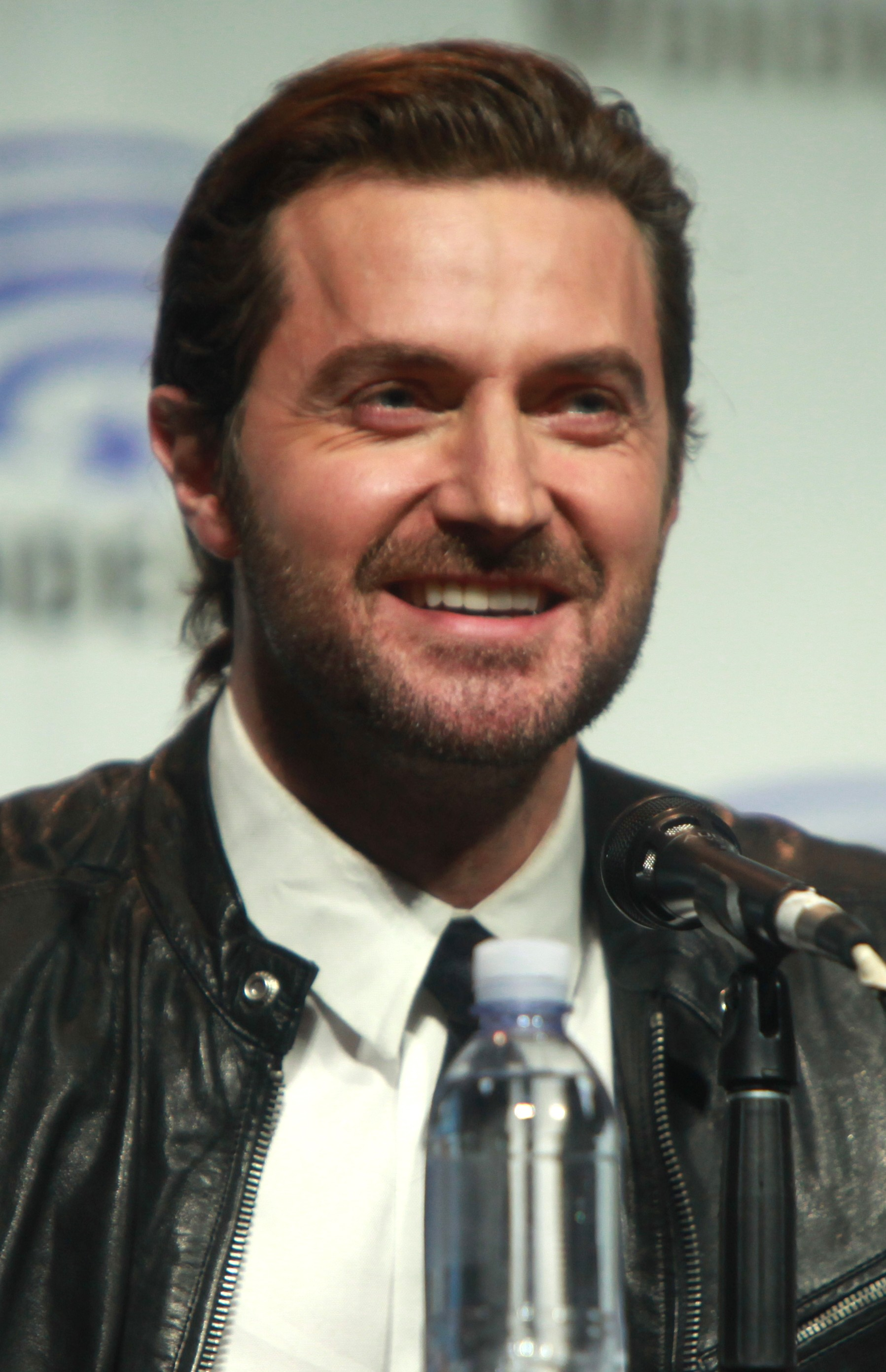
- Armitage at the 2014 WonderCon
- Born: Richard Crispin Armitage; 22 August 1971 (age 55); Huncote, Leicestershire, England
- Education: London Academy of Music and Dramatic Art
- Occupations: Actor; author
- Years active: 1988–present

Richard Crispin Armitage (/ˈɑːmətɪdʒ/; born 22 August 1971) is an English actor and author. He received recognition in the UK with his first leading role as John Thornton in the British television programme North & South (2004). His role as dwarf king and leader Thorin Oakenshield in Peter Jackson's film trilogy adaptation of The Hobbit brought him international recognition.

Other notable roles include John Proctor in Yaël Farber's stage production of Arthur Miller's The Crucible, Francis Dolarhyde in the American television series Hannibal, Lucas North in the British television drama Spooks, John Porter in the British television drama Strike Back, Daniel Miller in the EPIX spy series Berlin Station and Guy of Gisborne in the British television drama Robin Hood. He voiced Trevor Belmont in the Netflix adaptation of Castlevania. In 2020, he played the lead role in the Netflix miniseries The Stranger.

After graduating from the London Academy of Music and Dramatic Art (LAMDA), Armitage initially sought theatre work and was a member of the Royal Shakespeare Company (RSC). He turned to film and television roles when he noticed that leading stage roles went to actors with name recognition who could bring in patrons to fill venues. After twelve years away and having earned that name recognition, Armitage returned to the stage in 2014, taking his first leading role in a major production. He played John Proctor in the successful and critically acclaimed production of The Crucible at The Old Vic, and earned an Olivier Award nomination for Best Actor. In 2022, he ventured into video games for the first time, providing the voice of the Daemon Prince Be'lakor in Total War: Warhammer III.

== Early life and education ==
Armitage was born on 22 August 1971 in Leicester, Leicestershire, the younger son of Margaret, a secretary, and John Armitage, an engineer. He has an older brother named Christopher.

He attended Huncote Community Primary School in Huncote, Blaby District, Leicestershire, and began secondary school at the local comprehensive school, Brockington College in Enderby. At Brockington, Armitage pursued his interest in music – playing the cello in school and local orchestras, and learning how to play the flute. By the age of 14, having secured a grant from the Leicestershire Authority, he successfully persuaded his mother to allow him to transfer to Pattison College in Coventry, an independent school specialising in the performing arts, so that he could focus on drama and dance.

Armitage has expressed gratitude for the lessons and opportunities Pattison College provided, saying "It... instilled me with a discipline that has stood me in good stead – never to be late, to know your lines and to be professional." By the time he finished school, he had achieved A Levels in music and English, and acting experience in local amateur and professional productions such as Showboat, Half a Sixpence, Orpheus and the Underworld (as Bacchus), and The Hobbit (as an elf) at the New Alexandra Theatre, Birmingham.

== Career ==
=== 1988–2003: Early work ===
After completing the programme at Pattison College in 1988, Armitage joined the Nachtcircus in Budapest for six months to obtain his Equity Card, a requirement at the time for entertainment professionals to work in the UK. Returning to the UK, he pursued a career in musical theatre – working as an assistant choreographer to Kenn Oldfield and performing in various productions, including the ensembles of 42nd Street, My One and Only, Nine, Annie Get Your Gun and as Admetus and Macavity in Cats. Armitage was also pursuing acting in dramatic theatre productions, including The Real Thing, Six Degrees of Separation and Death of a Salesman.

By 1992, he began to doubt if musical theatre was the right career path, so he enrolled at the London Academy of Music and Dramatic Art (LAMDA) in 1993 to further study acting. "I needed to do something a bit more truthful than musical theatre. For me it was a bit too theatrical and all about standing on stage and showing off. I was looking for something else, so that's why I went back to drama school."

After completing LAMDA's three-year programme, he returned to the stage as a supporting player with the Royal Shakespeare Company's productions of Macbeth and The Duchess of Malfi, as well as Hamlet and Four Alice Bakers with the Birmingham Repertory Theatre while taking a series of small roles in television and films. In 2002 he starred in the Charm Offensive's production of Use Me As Your Cardigan.

That same year, Armitage appeared in his first major television role, as John Standring in the BBC drama Sparkhouse (2002). "It was the first time I went to an audition in character. It was a minor role but it was something I really got my teeth into... I couldn't go back. I knew I had to approach everything the same way." After this he took supporting roles in the TV productions of Between the Sheets, Cold Feet (series 5), and Ultimate Force (series 2).

=== 2004–2010: Television success ===
In 2004, Armitage landed his first leading role as textile mill owner John Thornton in the BBC adaptation of Elizabeth Gaskell's North & South. The director and producers took a chance casting a little-known actor for their leading man. He was the first actor to audition for the role and the last person cast. North & South was an unexpected success. The BBC message boards crashed shortly after the telecast as a result of chatter about him and he was hailed as the new "Mr. Darcy" (referring to Colin Firth's "Mr Darcy" whom many regard as the definitive romantic leading man). Armitage did not perceive John Thornton as the ideal romantic leading man role and was surprised by the response. Instead, he said that he felt personally drawn to the role, as his father's family had been weavers. He cited Thornton's dualism as drawing him to the character. "The dichotomy between the powerful, almost monstrous, entrepreneur and this kind of vulnerable boy is exciting for me to look at."

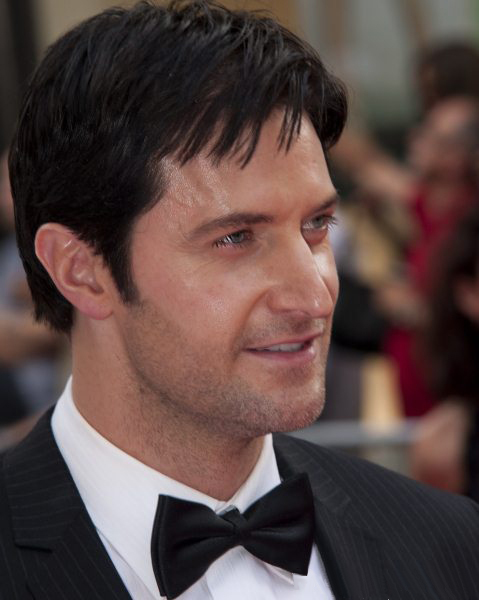
Armitage at the 2010 BAFTA TV Awards

In 2005, he played Peter MacDuff in Macbeth in the BBC's ShakespeaRe-Told series and appeared as a recovering gambling addict in one episode of Inspector Lynley Mysteries. He starred in The Impressionists, playing the young Claude Monet, and as Dr Alec Track in ITV's The Golden Hour, a medical series based on the London Air Ambulance. His first substantial role in movies was in the independent film Frozen.

In 2006, Armitage was cast as Guy of Gisborne in the BBC series Robin Hood, which was filmed in Hungary. "In order to sustain the character of Guy, you have to find the conflict within him. He's constantly pulled between good and evil, between who he wants to be and who he actually is. He could have been a good man, but he is forever dragged down by his fatal flaw – that he wants glory at all costs." Approaching the third series, he said, "I do love playing him, but with a character like Gisborne, if you give him what he needs, then in a way, it's over. That character is only interesting when he isn't getting what he wants, whether it's power, money or the girl." The third and final series of Robin Hood started on 28 March 2009.

Armitage appeared in a two-part 2006/07 Christmas/New Years special of The Vicar of Dibley, as Harry Kennedy, the vicar's new love interest (and eventual husband). He reprised the role in 2007 for Red Nose Day. On 8 April 2007, he played biker Ricky Deeming in the detective drama George Gently with Martin Shaw and Lee Ingleby. On 9 May 2007, he appeared in the BBC Four production of Miss Marie Lloyd – Queen of The Music Hall playing Marie Lloyd's first husband, Percy Courtenay. He also appeared in the Granada TV production of Agatha Christie's novel Ordeal by Innocence as the character Philip Durrant.

Armitage joined the cast of Spooks as the character Lucas North for series 7, which began on 27 October 2008 in the UK. Armitage notes that the character, who spent eight years in a Russian prison, has a personable exterior, but is psychologically damaged. "I love films with a combination of action and good characters. That's why Lucas is interesting as I get to play someone with a complex psychology who goes out there and tries to save the world." During the filming of series 7 Armitage allowed himself to be subjected to waterboarding to film a flashback sequence. In July 2010, Armitage completed filming of series 9, his final series.

On 20 May 2009, Armitage appeared in the BBC1 drama Moving On as John Mulligan.

In May 2010, Armitage starred as former SAS trooper John Porter in Strike Back (also known as Chris Ryan's Strike Back) for Sky1. Filmed in South Africa, Armitage found the main challenge of the role was to show how the character resolved being a trained killer with having a family and home life. "In the end it was the character I was attracted to, the story of a man who makes a decision under pressure and that decision has a knock-on effect on his whole life," he said. "He goes in search of atonement still believing he did the right thing even though it cost the lives of three of his friends... There's anger and there's injustice. It's like, 'I did the right thing, with the wrong outcome.'" By the time Sky1 and Cinemax decided to commission a second series of Strike Back called Strike Back: Project Dawn, Armitage had committed to The Hobbit and was unable to continue in the series. However, he appeared as a guest star in the first episode to resolve John Porter's fate.

It was his role as John Porter that led to his casting in Captain America: The First Avenger. American casting agents noticed posters of him as John Porter in London. Although unknown to them, they offered him the role of Nazi spy Heinz Kruger because he looked the part. Armitage accepted and shot his scenes in the autumn of 2010, after filming wrapped on Spooks, series 9. The film was released in July 2011.

=== 2010–present: film success and beyond ===
On 21 October 2010, Peter Jackson announced Armitage was cast as Thorin Oakenshield in the three-film production of The Hobbit. All three films were released in December, starting with The Hobbit: An Unexpected Journey in 2012, The Hobbit: The Desolation of Smaug in 2013 and The Hobbit: The Battle of the Five Armies in 2014. Armitage thought it was a wonderful opportunity, as he grew up reading the book. Coincidentally, one of his first stage roles was playing an elf in a production of The Hobbit at the Alex Theatre in Birmingham. He describes the character of Thorin as being complex and flawed, "somebody that had doubts and that had fears, and there was a gentle side to him and a very perhaps lonely side to him." He notes the scene with Balin in Bag End shows the character's inner sensitivity and fear of failure, "failing where his father and his grandfather had failed as well."

After filming had been completed on The Hobbit, Armitage flew to Detroit, Michigan to film Into the Storm from July to September 2012. He starred as Gary Fuller, a high school vice principal and football coach with two teenage sons. The film from New Line was released in August 2014.

In March 2014, Armitage began the eight-week shoot of an adaptation of Bernard Hare's memoir Urban Grimshaw and the Shed Crew in Leeds, UK. He played "Chop" (the author's nickname), an ex-social worker, drunk and drug addict in Britain's lowerclass who befriends the hardened young delinquent Urban. Armitage explained his attraction to this role: "it ticks a few boxes for me: it"s based on a really interesting piece of literature, but also based on living people, who have been working with us on set." Urban and the Shed Crew premiered at the Leeds International Film Festival (LIFF) on 7 November 2015.

Armitage next appeared as John Proctor in The Old Vic's production of Arthur Miller's The Crucible. Directed by Yaël Farber and performed in the round, the play ran from 21 June to 13 September 2014. The production drew an unprecedented number of 5-star reviews and was a commercial success. For his performance, Armitage was awarded Best Leading Actor in a New Production of a Play by Broadway World:UK Awards 2014 and a Best Actor nomination for an Olivier Award. Due to worldwide demand to see the production, Digital Theatre captured the live performance to bring The Crucible to cinemas and for digital download. It was screened at cinemas on 4 and 7 December 2014 in the UK and Ireland, with further screenings in other selected territories in February and March 2015. Copyright issues prevented the film from being screened at North American cinemas. Digital Theatre made the digital download available worldwide on 17 March 2015.

In a September 2014 interview, Armitage revealed he would film his cameo role of King Oleron in Alice Through the Looking Glass in London after The Crucible closed. The film was released in May 2016.

Armitage spent four weeks in October 2014 filming Sleepwalker in the greater Los Angeles area. In this psychological thriller, Armitage plays Dr. Scott White, a senior MD at a sleep research center. Released on 4 February 2017.

DeLaurentiis Company tweeted on 13 January 2015 that Armitage was cast as Francis Dolarhyde in the TV production of Hannibal, written and co-produced by Bryan Fuller. Dolarhyde is a serial killer, a character type which Armitage had expressed interest in portraying. He filmed the series in Toronto, Canada from January to April, and the series aired from 4 June to 29 August 2015. Armitage appeared in the last six episodes of season 3, earning high praise, wide acclaim and several award nominations, including two wins.

After wrapping on Hannibal in late April 2015, Armitage joined his fellow Pilgrimage castmates who had already begun filming in Connemara, Ireland two weeks prior. He plays Sir Raymond De Merville, a 13th-century French Norman who is intent on foiling a group of monks escorting a sacred relic from Ireland to Rome. The cast and crew later moved to the Ardennes region of Belgium to complete filming, with Armitage wrapping one week earlier than the film wrap at the end of May.

News broke on 13 May 2015 that Armitage would star in Clearance, the first English language film by Finnish director Aku Louhimies and set to film in South Africa in November 2015. It is an action drama about a hardened mine expert named Ray (Armitage) and his pregnant partner (Naomie Harris) who are kidnapped in South Sudan.

In a June 2015 interview, Armitage mentioned his next projects included an Edith Wharton film and a true Irish tragic drama. Per agent David Higham, Bridget Cleary is likely the Irish drama.

On 12 July 2015, Armitage revealed he was about to start filming Brain on Fire in Vancouver, Canada. Subsequent news outlets provided more details about his role as "Big Man" Tom Cahalan, father of the protagonist in the true-life story of young journalist Susannah Cahalan's sudden descent into inexplicable madness and the eleventh-hour diagnosis by one doctor. Filming began 13 July 2015. Brain on Fire premiered at the Toronto International Film Festival (TIFF) on 14 September 2016.

Armitage landed the lead role of Daniel Miller in Berlin Station, an original spy series for Epix. His character, a cerebral analyst from Langley, is a newly anointed undercover CIA officer tasked with finding a mole in Berlin. Filmed in Berlin from November 2015 to April 2016, with some additional filming in the Canary Islands, the series premiered on Epix in the autumn of 2016.

On 13 July 2016, Roundabout Theatre Company announced Armitage was cast as Kenneth in the American premiere of Love, Love, Love by playwright Mike Bartlett. Love, Love, Love marks Armitage's first leading role in a theatrical play on an American stage. The off-Broadway play ran from 22 September to 18 December 2016 at the intimate Laura Pels Theater in New York City.

Armitage co-starred in the heist comedy Ocean's 8 (2018).

In February 2017, it was announced that Armitage had joined the cast of Julie Delpy's film My Zoe. In it he will play the role of James, the ex-husband of Delpy's character Isabelle. Their toxic marriage may be over but they are still in contact with each other as they co-parent their daughter Zoe. But when tragedy strikes this fractured family, Isabelle takes matters into her own hands. In February 2018, Armitage joined the cast of The Lodge, which began filming in early February. Armitage plays the leading role of Adam Price in Netflix's 2020 mystery thriller miniseries, The Stranger, which is based on the Harlan Coben novel of the same title. The series has been critically acclaimed, with a rating of 89% from Rotten Tomatoes.

In 2022, Armitage gave his first performance in a video game, appearing as the Daemon Prince Be'lakor in Creative Assembly's real-time strategy game Total War: Warhammer III.

=== Richard III connection ===
Armitage was hoping to star in a drama based on Richard III. Armitage was born on the anniversary of the Battle of Bosworth Field, where Richard III was killed and has said "I believe it is a great story, a socio-political thriller, a love story and a dynastic tragedy." He thinks the story has the potential to be told as a twenty-episode miniseries. A script has been in development since 2010 and "a lot of people... are interested [in producing it], but there is no one that will step on the gas."

== Acting style ==
Armitage has described himself as a method actor. "Yeah, I suppose I am. In a way it's slightly lazy because it means you don't have to pretend – you just have to believe. As much as it's possible to be like that I suppose I kind of do step in and out, I'm not one of these people that can't talk to other people because I'm in my character, but I kind of do stay with the character, yeah. He's always there. It's like marinating something – you're sitting in a marinade the whole time." He has also spoken of dreaming in character while playing John Porter and Thorin Oakenshield. However, recently he rejected the label of "method actor." "I think I'm a concentrating actor. So in order to do my work in the course of a day, particularly with a character like this I have to concentrate. So it's about staying in the scene, staying with my head in the scene and attempting to keep the character with me. It doesn't mean I can't have a conversation or go and make a cup of coffee. But I actually stay with the character for 18 months."

He frequently speaks of developing and being drawn to dualism in his characters. "If I'm offered the role of the hero, I immediately look for the antihero within!... I see everything in terms of an outer skin and an inner skin." He creates "character diaries" with entire biographies for the characters he plays. "It was important to me to put in a background for my character that would be useful for the whole journey. A lot of that is secret and no one gets to read that. It's what is useful to me. If you are playing something long-running and a role that has a future [beyond the initial series], it's almost like you have to plant a garden which you will need to come back to at some point. If you don't put in early, it can jar with you."

== Personal life ==
Armitage states that sexuality is fluid, and not fixed. He came out to his family at the age of 19. In 2023, he publicly disclosed that he had a male partner.

== Filmography ==
=== Film ===
| Year | Title | Role | Notes | Ref. |
|---|---|---|---|---|
| 1999 | Star Wars: Episode I – The Phantom Menace | Naboo fighter pilot | Uncredited | |
| 1999 | Staged | Daryl Newman | Short film | |
| 1999 | This Year's Love | Smug Man at Party | | |
| 2005 | Frozen | Steven | | |
| 2011 | Captain America: The First Avenger | Heinz Kruger | | |
| 2012 | The Hobbit: An Unexpected Journey | Thorin Oakenshield | | |
| 2013 | The Hobbit: The Desolation of Smaug | Thorin Oakenshield | Nominated - Empire Award for Best Supporting Actor | |
| 2014 | The Hobbit: The Battle of the Five Armies | Thorin Oakenshield | Won - Saturn Award for Best Supporting Actor; Nominated - Empire Award for Best Actor | |
| 2014 | Into the Storm | Gary Fuller | | |
| 2014 | The Crucible | John Proctor | Film capturing live stage performance of the production at The Old Vic | |
| 2015 | Urban and the Shed Crew | Chop | Won - Newcastle International Film Festival Award for Best Actor | |
| 2016 | Alice Through the Looking Glass | King Oleron | | |
| 2016 | Brain on Fire | Tom Cahalan | | |
| 2017 | Sleepwalker | Dr. Scott White | | |
| 2017 | Pilgrimage | Sir Raymond De Merville | | |
| 2018 | Ocean's 8 | Claude Becker | | |
| 2019 | The Lodge | Richard | | |
| 2019 | My Zoe | James | | |
| 2021 | Space Sweepers | James Sullivan | South Korean film on Netflix | |
| 2022 | The Man from Rome | Father Quart | | |
| 2023 | The Boy in the Woods | Jasko | | |

=== Television ===
| Year | Title | Role | Notes | Ref. |
|---|---|---|---|---|
| 1992 | Boon | Man in pub | Episode: "Message in a Bottle"; Uncredited | |
| 1999 | Cleopatra | Epiphanes | Television miniseries | |
| 2001 | Macbeth | Angus | Television film of RSC production from Roundhouse, London | |
| 2001 | Doctors | Dr. Tom Steele | Episodes: "Good Companions", "Cat's Out of the Bag" | |
| 2001 | Casualty | Craig Parker | Episode: "Playing with Fire" | |
| 2002 | Spooks | Armed police officer | Episode: "Traitor's Gate" | |
| 2002 | Sparkhouse | John Standring | BBC drama; Television film | |
| 2003 | Cold Feet | Lee Preston | 6 episodes | |
| 2003 | Ultimate Force | Capt. Ian Macalwain | 5 episodes | |
| 2003 | Between the Sheets | Paul Andrews | ITV miniseries | |
| 2004 | North & South | John Thornton | BBC miniseries | |
| 2005 | The Inspector Lynley Mysteries | Philip Turner | Episode: "In Divine Proportion" | |
| 2005 | Malice Aforethought | William Chatford | ITV drama; Television film | |
| 2005 | The Golden Hour | Dr. Alec Track | 4 episodes | |
| 2005 | ShakespeaRe-Told | Peter Macduff | Episode: "Macbeth" | |
| 2006 | The Impressionists | Young Claude Monet | BBC docudrama; Miniseries | |
| 2006 | CBeebies: Bedtime Hour | Himself / Storyteller | BBC children's series; 5 episodes | |
| 2006–2009 | Robin Hood | Guy of Gisborne | 37 episodes | |
| 2006–2007 | The Vicar of Dibley | Harry Kennedy | Christmas Special: "The Handsome Stranger", "The Vicar in White", Comic Relief Special: "Wife Swap" | |
| 2007 | Inspector George Gently | Ricky Deeming | Episode: "Gently Go Man" | |
| 2007 | Miss Marie Lloyd | Percy Courtenay | BBC drama; Television film | |
| 2007 | Agatha Christie's Marple | Philip Durrant | Episode: "Ordeal by Innocence" | |
| 2008–2010 | Spooks | Lucas North | 25 episodes | |
| 2009 | Moving On | John Mulligan | Episode: "Drowning not Waving" | |
| 2010 | Chris Ryan's Strike Back | John Porter | Lead (first Season, 6 episodes) | |
| 2011 | Strike Back: Project Dawn | John Porter | 1 episode | |
| 2015 | Hannibal | Francis Dolarhyde | 6 episodes; Won - Saturn Award for Best Supporting Actor on Television; Won - Fangoria Chainsaw Award for Best TV Supporting Actor | |
| 2016–2019 | Berlin Station | Daniel Miller | | |
| 2017–2021 | Castlevania | Trevor Belmont | Voice; Main role | |
| 2020 | The Stranger | Adam Price | Miniseries | |
| 2021 | Stay Close | Ray Levine | Miniseries | |
| 2023 | Obsession | William Farrow | Miniseries | |
| 2024 | Fool Me Once | Joe Burkett | 8 episodes | |
| 2024 | Red Eye | Dr Matthew Nolan | Lead role | |
| 2024 | Tomb Raider: The Legend of Lara Croft | Charles Devereaux | Voice; 7 episodes | |
| 2025 | Missing You | Sergeant Ellis Stagger | 5 episodes | |
| 2026 | Winter | Dr Ethan Winter | 6 episodes | |

=== Theatre ===
| Year | Title | Role | Playwright | Venue | Notes | Ref. |
|---|---|---|---|---|---|---|
| 1995 | The Long and the Short and the Tall | Macliesh | Willis Hall | Actors' Centre's Tristram Bates Theatre | | |
| 1995 | The Real Thing | Henry | Tom Stoppard | Old School Manchester | | |
| 1995 | Six Degrees of Separation | Flan | John Guare | Old School Manchester | | |
| 1995 | Death of a Salesman | Biff | Arthur Miller | Old School Manchester | | |
| 1998 | Hamlet | Bernardo | William Shakespeare | Birmingham Repertory Theatre | Opened on 22 September 1998 for three-week run. | |
| 1999 | The Four Alice Bakers | Young Richie Baker | Fay Weldon | Birmingham Repertory Theatre | Ran from 23 February to 13 March 1999. | |
| 1999–2000 | Macbeth | Angus | William Shakespeare | Swan Theatre (Stratford); Theatre Royal, Brighton; Theatre Royal, Bath; The Globe Tokyo; Young Vic; Long Wharf Theatre | Royal Shakespeare Company; Opened 2 November 1999 in Stratford; Brighton (24-29 Jan 2000); Bath (1-5 Feb 2000); Tokyo (24 March to 8 April 2000); London (10 April to 3 June 2000); New Haven, USA (15–25 June 2000). | |
| 2000–2001 | The Duchess of Malfi | Delio | John Webster | Barbican Theatre; various UK theatres; Royal Shakespeare Theatre | Royal Shakespeare Company; Opened 10 November 2000 in London; UK tour; Stratford (6 February to 3 March 2001). | |
| 2002 | Use Me As Your Cardigan | Jez | Samantha Ellis | Jacksons Lane | Ran from 19 February to 9 March 2002. | |
| 2010 | The Twenty Four Hour Plays Celebrity Gala: The Third Wish | Dennis/Himself | Stephen Beresford | The Old Vic | Fundraising event. The first of six short plays performed on 21 November 2010. | |
| 2014 | Pinter/PROUST: Remembrance of Things Past | Swann, Journalist, Brothel Patron | Harold Pinter and Marcel Proust | 92nd Street Y Unterberg Poetry Center | Staged reading. Performed on 16 January 2014 as part of the centenary celebrations commemorating the publication of Swann's Way. | |
| 2014 | The Crucible | John Proctor | Arthur Miller | The Old Vic | Ran from 21 June to 13 September 2014. Win—Broadway World:UK Awards for Best Leading Actor in a New Production of a Play | |
| 2016 | Love, Love, Love | Kenneth | Mike Bartlett | Laura Pels Theater | Ran from 22 September to 18 December 2016. | |
| 2020 | Uncle Vanya | Astrov | Anton Chekhov | Harold Pinter Theatre | From January 2020. | |
| 2026 | Jesus Christ Superstar | King Herod | Andrew Lloyd Webber | London Palladium | July 13-August 1 + August 8 | |

=== Discography ===
| Year | Title | Role | Author | Notes |
|---|---|---|---|---|
| 2006 | Robin Hood: Will You Tolerate This? | Narrator | Kristy Neale | First published 13 October 2006 by BBC Audiobooks |
| 2006 | Robin Hood: Sheriff Got Your Tongue? | Narrator | Kay Woodward | First published 6 November 2006 by BBC Audiobooks |
| 2006 | Robin Hood: Who Shot The Sheriff? | Narrator | Jacqueline Rayner | First published 6 November 2006 by BBC Audiobooks |
| 2006 | Robin Hood: Parent Hood | Narrator | Mandy Archer | First published 6 November 2006 by BBC Audiobooks |
| 2007 | The Lords of the North | Narrator | Bernard Cornwell | First published July 2007 by Chivers Audiobooks |
| 2009 | Robin Hood: The Witch Finders | Narrator | Rebecca Levene | First published April 2009 by Big Finish Productions |
| 2009 | Robin Hood: The Siege | Narrator | Simon Guerrier | First published 30 June 2009 by Big Finish Productions |
| 2009 | Sylvester | Narrator | Georgette Heyer | First published 1 July 2009 by Naxos Audiobooks |
| 2010 | Venetia | Narrator | Georgette Heyer | First published 1 April 2010 by Naxos Audiobooks |
| 2010 | The Convenient Marriage | Narrator | Georgette Heyer | First published 2 August 2010 by Naxos Audiobooks |
| 2014 | Hamlet, Prince of Denmark: A Novel | Narrator | A. J. Hartley and David Hewson | First released 20 May 2014 by Audible Originals; Win—Audible Award for Best Audiobook of the Year |
| 2015 | Classic Love Poems | Narrator | William Shakespeare, Edgar Allan Poe, Elizabeth Barrett Browning and more | First released 9 February 2015 by Audible Studios |
| 2015 | The Chimes | Narrator | Charles Dickens | First released 11 December 2015 by Audible Studios |
| 2016 | David Copperfield | Narrator | Charles Dickens | First released 9 February 2016 by Audible Studios |
| 2016 | Introduction to The Turn of the Screw | Co-narrator | Henry James | First released 15 March 2016 by Audible Studios |
| 2016 | Romeo and Juliet: A Novel | Narrator | David Hewson | First released 6 December 2016 by Audible Originals |
| 2017 | The Strange Case of Dr Jekyll and Mr Hyde | Narrator | Robert Louis Stevenson | First released 24 October 2017 by Audible Studios (Part of The Monster Collection) |
| 2018 | The Martian Invasion of Earth | Co-narrator | HG Wells | First released 2 February 2018 by Big Finish Classics audiobooks |
| 2018 | Wanderlust | Co-narrator | Lauren Blakely | First released 6 February 2018 by Audible Originals |
| 2018 | The Tattooist of Auschwitz | Co-narrator | Heather Morris | First released 20 February 2018 by Bolinda Publishing |
| 2018 | The Bloody Chamber | Co-narrator | Angela Carter | First released 15 March 2018 by Audible Studios |
| 2018 | Their Lost Daughters | Narrator | Joy Ellis | First released 29 May 2018 by Audible Studios |
| 2018 | The Man from St. Petersburg | Narrator | Ken Follett | First released 23 August 2018 by Macmillan Digital Audio |
| 2018 | The Murderer's Son | Narrator | Joy Ellis | First released 16 October 2018 by Audible Studios |
| 2018 | The Snowman | Narrator | Raymond Briggs | First released 18 October 2018 by Penguin Books |
| 2018 | The Other Queen | Co-Narrator | Philippa Gregory | First released 1 November 2018 by HarperCollins |
| 2018 | Heads You Win | Narrator | Jeffrey Archer | First released 6 November 2018 by Macmillan Digital Audio |
| 2018 | The Fourth Friend | Narrator | Joy Ellis | First released 6 December 2018 by Audible Studios |
| 2018 | The Christmas Hirelings | Narrator | Mary Elizabeth Braddon | First released 10 December 2018 by Audible Studios |
| 2019 | The Taking of Annie Thorne | Narrator | C.J. Tudor | First released 21 February 2019 by Penguin Audio |
| 2019 | A Nearly Normal Family | Co-narrator | M.T. Edvardsson | First released 25 June 2019 by Pan Macmillan |
| 2019 | Meditations | Narrator | Marcus Aurelius, Diskin Clay, Martin Hammond | First released 26 September 2019 by Penguin Audio |
| 2019 | Voices of History: Speeches That Changed the World | Co-narrator | Simon Sebag Montefiore | First released 1 October 2019 by Orion Books (Weidenfeld & Nicolson) |
| 2019 | The Stolen Boys | Narrator | Joy Ellis | First released 31 October 2019 by Audible Studios |
| 2020 | The Other People | Narrator | C.J. Tudor | First released 28 January 2020 by Penguin Audio |
| 2020 | His & Hers | Co-narrator | Alice Feeney | First released 28 May 2020 by HQ |
| 2020 | The Jane Austen Society | Narrator | Natalie Jenner | First released 28 May 2020 by Orion Books |
| 2020 | The Chekhov Collection of Short Stories | Narrator | Anton Chekhov | First released 11 June 2020 by Audible Studios |
| 2020 | Bedlam | Narrator | LJ Ross | First released 7 July 2020 by Whole Story Audiobooks |
| 2020 | They Disappeared | Narrator | Joy Ellis | First released 30 July 2020 by Audible Studios |
| 2021 | Gallifrey: Time War - Volume Four | Rassilon | Lisa McMullin, Lou Morgan, David Llewellyn & Matt Fitton | First released February 2021 by Big Finish Productions |
| 2022 | Gallifrey: War Room 1 - Allegiance | Rassilon | Lou Morgan, David Llewellyn, Alfie Shaw & Sophie Iles | First released August 2022 by Big Finish Productions |
| 2022 | Geneva | Co-narrator | Richard Armitage | Released October 2022 by Audible Originals |
| 2024 | Jonathan Strange & Mr Norrell: 20th Anniversary Edition | Narrator | Susanna Clarke | Released October 2024 by Macmillan Audio |
| 2025 | Don't Let Him In | Co-narrator | Lisa Jewell | First released June 2025 by Simon & Schuster Audio |

=== Radio ===
- 2007: BBC Radio 4: The Ted Hughes Letters, as Ted Hughes (29 October 2007)
- 2007: BBC Radio 2: A War Less Ordinary, narrator (10 November 2007)
- 2010: BBC Radio 4: Clarissa: The History of a Young Lady, as Robert Lovelace (14 March 2010)
- 2010: BBC Radio 3: Words and Music: Symphony of a City as narrator (12 September 2010)
- 2026: Classic FM:Curtain Call with Richard Armitage

=== Voice-over ===
- 2007: Channel 4: Empire's Children, as narrator (2 July 2007)
- 2009: ITV1: Homes from Hell, as narrator (3 March 2009)
- 2009: Channel 4: The Great Sperm Race, as narrator (23 March 2009)
- 2010–11: Voice-over for Santander TV and radio adverts
- 2010: BBC 2: The Natural World, Forest Elephants: Rumbles in the Jungle, as narrator
- 2010–2011: Voice-over for Sky Sports HD TV and radio adverts
- 2010: Voice-over for General Election 2010 Leaders' Debates radio adverts
- 2010: Voice-over for BBC Winter Olympics TV and radio adverts
- 2010: Voice-over for Alfa Romeo Mito TV advert
- 2010: Voice-over for John Bull Jewelers radio adverts
- 2010: ITV: Surgery School, as narrator
- 2010: Voice-over for Hyundai ix20 TV advert
- 2010: BBC: Lost Land of the Tiger, as narrator
- 2011: BBC: Elsa: The Lioness That Changed the World, as narrator
- 2010: Voice-over for ActionAidUK TV advert
- 2011: Voice-over for Pilsner Urquell TV advert
- 2011: Discovery Channel UK: HMS Ark Royal, as narrator
- 2011: Eden Channel: Trouble in Lemur Land: Phantoms of the Forest, as narrator
- 2011: BBC2: 125 Years of Wimbledon: You Cannot Be Serious, as narrator
- 2011: Voice-over for LG Optimus 3D Smartphone TV advert
- 2011: ITV: Fraud Squad, as narrator
- 2011: National Geographic Wild: Leopards of Dead Tree island, as narrator
- 2012: ITV: Fraud Squad, series two, as narrator

=== Podcast shows ===
- 2018: Wolverine: The Long Night as Logan / Wolverine
- 2019: Wolverine: The Lost Trail as Logan / Wolverine

=== Video games ===
- 2022: Total War: Warhammer III as Be'lakor

== Written works ==
Publications by Richard Armitage
| Target/ type | Title | Publisher | Date | Ref. |
|---|---|---|---|---|
| Adult | Geneva | Pegasus Crime | 20 October 2022 | |
| Adult | The Cut | Pegasus Crime | 22 August 2024 | |

== Awards and nominations ==
| Year | Work | Award | Category | Result | Ref. |
|---|---|---|---|---|---|
| 2009 | Spooks | Golden Nymph Awards | Outstanding Actor – Drama Series | Nominated | |
| 2009 | Spooks | TV Quick Awards | Best Actor | Nominated | |
| 2011 | Venetia | Audie Awards | Best Audiobook Adaptation | Nominated | |
| 2013 | The Hobbit: An Unexpected Journey | SFX Awards | Best Actor | Nominated | |
| 2014 | The Hobbit: The Desolation of Smaug | Empire Awards | Best Supporting Actor | Nominated | |
| 2014 | Hamlet, Prince of Denmark: A Novel | Audible Best of 2014 | Audiobook of the Year | Won | |
| 2014 | The Crucible | Broadway World: UK Awards | Best Leading Actor in a New Production of a Play | Won | |
| 2015 | The Crucible | What's On Stage Awards | Best Actor in a Play | Nominated | |
| 2015 | The Hobbit: The Battle of the Five Armies | SFX Awards | Best Actor | Nominated | |
| 2015 | The Hobbit: The Battle of the Five Armies | Empire Awards | Best Actor | Nominated | |
| 2015 | The Hobbit: The Battle of the Five Armies | Saturn Awards | Best Supporting Actor in a film | Won | |
| 2015 | Hamlet, Prince of Denmark: A Novel | Audie Awards | Best Solo Narration – Male | Nominated | |
| 2015 | The Crucible | Olivier Awards | Best Actor | Nominated | |
| 2016 | Hannibal | Critics' Choice Awards | Best Guest Actor/Actress in a Drama Series | Nominated | |
| 2016 | Hannibal | Fangoria Chainsaw Awards | Best TV Supporting Actor | Won | |
| 2016 | Hannibal | Saturn Awards | Best Supporting Actor on a television series | Won | |
| 2016 | Classic Love Poems | Audie Awards | Best Male Narrator | Nominated | |
| 2018 | Urban and the Shed Crew | Newcastle International Film Festival | Best Actor | Won | |

== Honours ==
Armitage was awarded the honorary degree of Doctor of Letters (D.Litt.) by the University of Leicester on 22 July 2022.
