= James Oakley (director) =

American film director

- Born: United States
- Occupations: Film director, producer, writer
- Years active: 2005–present

James E. Oakley (born 1972/1973) is an American film director, producer and writer. He made his feature film directing debut with The Devil You Know (2005). His second feature film The Con Is On was released in 2018.

== Career ==
In 2005, Oakley directed his first feature film The Devil You Know starring Dean Winters, Rosamund Pike, Lena Olin and then aspiring actress Jennifer Lawrence. However, the film was never released until its video on demand release on July 9, 2013. On film concept and idea, Oakley said, "I went to American Film Institute to the directing program and found it very restrictive. Although in hindsight, I probably should not have found it that way. I met my whole team there—the director of photography, the writer, the producer, the set designers—and we wanted to make a feature quickly out of the program. The writer had an idea that seemed interesting. So, we started putting it together." Oakley describes Mildred Pierce as his inspiration behind the film.

In 2013, Oakley co-wrote the screenplay for The Con is On with Alex Michaelides. On May 14, 2015, it was announced that Uma Thurman would star in the film, with Oakley directing. Oakley described the film as a "heist comedy" and said it was like "The Palm Beach Story meets A Fish Called Wanda". It also features an ensemble cast of Kristin Chenoweth, Tim Roth, Alice Eve, Sofía Vergara, Maggie Q, Parker Posey and Stephen Fry.

== Personal ==
He is the stepson of Jimmy Haslam since his mother Dee Bagwell remarried.

== Filmography ==
=== Feature films ===
- Screen Test (2010)
- The Devil You Know (2013)
- The Con Is On (2018)

=== Short films ===
- Alice (2005)
