= The Devil You Know (film) =

- Directed by: James Oakley
- Written by: Alex Michaelides
- Produced by: Amanda Foley; Peter McIntosh; James Oakley; Michael Webber
- Starring: Lena Olin; Rosamund Pike
- Cinematography: Kenneth Brown
- Edited by: Luke Dye
- Music by: Mark Sayfritz
- Production company: RIVR Media
- Distributed by: Roger Films
- Release date: July 9, 2013
- Running time: 76 minutes
- Country: United States
- Language: English

The Devil You Know is a 2013 American mystery thriller film starring Lena Olin and Rosamund Pike. Jennifer Lawrence also appears in the film, playing a younger version of the character portrayed by Pike.

== Plot ==
Zoe Hughes is an up-and-coming young actress, trying to follow in her mother Kathryn Vale's footsteps, who once was a popular film star. A scene of Zoe's gets interrupted by Kathryn's dramatic entrance, and later in the dressing room, Kathryn has nothing but criticism for her.

That evening, Zoe watches a TV interview with Kathryn promoting her recently published memoir, 'Behind the Vale'. The interviewer points out that it's been ten years since her husband's unsolved murder and since her career has been paused. As Kathryn's recently remarried to Jake, she's asked if she is aiming for a come-back, she denies it, citing Zoe's career as being more important.

Nevertheless, a script arrives at Kathryn's door and the next day she's meeting with her agent. He discourages her, warning that she again may feel a backlash due to the unsolved murder. However, she refuses to heed the warnings, insisting she must get back to acting.

Kathryn's assistant Edie decides to let Zoe know, but she is incredulous. That evening, at a cocktail party, she points out Kathryn speaking to someone which proves her right.

Zoe's next screen test goes poorly, as concerns for her mother's possible comeback distract her. At dinner with Kathryn and Jake, Zoe cockily says it went great, but again her mother is discouraging. When she confronts her about competing with her, Zoe points out that her mother wants her to do well as long as she doesn't do better than her.

While rumors of Vale's involvement in the unsolved murder are persistent, the rivalry between mother and daughter grows. Zoe invites Jake over to have sex, but before he can leave, Kathryn shows up. She divulges she's recently been receiving black cards with 'MURDERER' printed on them.

== Cast ==
- Rosamund Pike as Zoe Hughes
  - Jennifer Lawrence as Young Zoe
- Lena Olin as Kathryn Vale
- Dean Winters as Jake Kelly
- Molly Price as Edie Fontaine
- Bern Cohen as Humphrey Smith
- Barbara Garrick as Joan Stone

== Production ==
The film was shot in 2005.

== Release ==
Originally set for a 2007 release, the film was officially released via video on demand on July 9, 2013.

== Reception ==
Writing for Influx Magazine, Nav Qateel rated it 6/10, stating in the conclusion of his review, "not one of the best films I’ve had to force myself to watch, even if I did finally get to glimpse the gorgeous Jennifer Lawrence after 50 boring minutes (...) Rosamund Pike was certainly pleasing enough to watch but not under these circumstances."
