= Chuck Chuck Baby =

2023 British musical romance film

- Film poster
- Directed by: Janis Pugh
- Screenplay by: Janis Pugh
- Produced by: Adam Partridge; Anne Beresford; Andrew Gillman; Peggy Cafferty
- Starring: Annabel Scholey; Louise Brealey
- Cinematography: Sarah Cunningham
- Edited by: Rebecca Lloyd
- Production companies: Artemisia Films; BBC Film; Play House Studios; Delta Pictures; BFI; Great Point Media; Ffilm Cymru Wales; MDF
- Distributed by: Studio Soho
- Release date: 18 August 2023 (Edinburgh)
- Running time: 102 minutes
- Country: United Kingdom
- Language: English

Chuck Chuck Baby is a 2023 British musical romance film, written and directed by Janis Pugh, winning two BAFTA Cymru awards in 2024 for Best feature and Breakthrough.

== Synopsis ==
Helen works in a chicken factory in present-day North Wales, while caring for Gwen, a mother-figure in her life. However, the return of her adolescent crush, Joanne, regains some of the joie de vivre she has lost, even though Joanne is battling her own demons. The film contains musical elements.

== Cast ==
- Annabel Scholey as Joanne
- Louise Brealey as Helen
- Sorcha Cusack as Gwen
- Celyn Jones as Gary
- Emily Fairn as Amy
- Emily Aston as Lynn
- Beverly Rudd as Paula
- Cat Simmons as Clare
- Edyta Budnik as Katrina

== Production ==
The film was written and directed by Janis Pugh in her feature-length debut. The film had funding from BBC Film, as well as the BFI and Ffilm Cymru Wales, receiving National Lottery funding. It was developed by Ffilm Cymru Wales, the BFI and Artemisia Films. For Artemisia, Anne Beresford and Andrew Gillman were producers on the project. Adam Partridge of Delta Pictures and Peggy Cafferty of Play House Studios were also producers. Executive producers included Kimberley Warner for Ffilm Cymru Wales, Lizzie Francke for the BFI, Mary Fisher and Max Fisher for MDF, Kathleen Glynn and Lorcan Kavanagh for Play House Studios and Jim Reeve for Great Point Media. The film features songs from the 1960s and 1970s.

=== Filming ===
Filming took place in Wales. Principal photography started in March 2022. Filming locations included the Flint and Mostyn areas.

== Release ==
The film was selected by the BFI and British Council for the Great8 showcase at the 2023 Cannes Marché.

The film had its world premiere at the Edinburgh Film Festival on August 18, 2023. In March 2024, Studio Soho acquired distribution rights to the film for the United Kingdom and Ireland.

== Reception ==
On the review aggregator website Rotten Tomatoes, 100% of 27 critics' reviews are positive. The website's consensus reads: "Deftly balancing the moods of kitchen sink drama and buoyant romantic comedy, Chuck Chuck Baby is a winning first feature from writer-director Janis Pugh."
