= Winter (British TV series) =

British television series

- Genre: Police procedural Crime drama
- Created by: David Allison; Mark Greig
- Based on: Balthazar by Clothilde Jamin and Clélia Constantine
- Written by: David Allison; Mark Greig
- Directed by: Dries Vos; Kaat Beels
- Starring: Richard Armitage; Annabel Scholey
- Music by: Hannes De Maeyer
- Country of origin: United Kingdom
- Original language: English
- No. of series: 1
- No. of episodes: 6

Production
- Executive producers: Jo McGrath; Walter Iuzzolino
- Producer: Matt Baker
- Running time: 45 minutes
- Production company: Eagle Eye Drama

Original release
- Network: ITV
- Release: 30 September 2026 – present

Winter is a British police procedural television series broadcast on ITVX and PBS Masterpiece. It stars Richard Armitage and Annabel Scholey and is based on the long-running French series Balthazar. It premiered on ITV on 30 September 2026.

== Premise ==
In Bristol, forensic pathologist Dr Ethan Winter and police officer DI Lauren Bell work together to solve complex crimes.

== Cast ==
- Richard Armitage as Dr Ethan Winter
- Annabel Scholey as DI Lauren Bell
- Jamie Kenna as DS Ellis Daldry
- Carlotta Banat as Simone Edwards
- Josh Barrow as Eddie Garside
- Adwoa Akoto as Jamila Ross
- Jay Taylor as Anthony Marlowe
- Rishi Rian as Rohan Chaudhary
- Deirdre Mullins as Maya Washington
- Ellis Elijah as Connor Marlowe
- Evie Coles as Ruby Marlowe
- Ella Bostyn as Alice Short

== Production ==
The series is adapted by David Allison and Mark Greig from the long-running French series Balthazar. It is directed by Dries Vos and Kaat Beels. It is produced by Matt Baker with Jo McGrath and Walter Iuzzolino as executive producers for Eagle Eye Drama.

The cast is led by Richard Armitage and Annabel Scholey and includes Jamie Kenna, Carlotta Banat, Josh Barrow, Adwoa Akoto, Jay Taylor, Rishi Rian, Deirdre Mullins, Ellis Elijah and Evie Coles.

Filming took place in Bristol and Belgium in early 2026, and had started by February of that year. First-look images from filming were released to the media in August 2026.

== Episodes ==
| No. | Directed by | Written by | Original release date | UK viewers (millions) |
|---|---|---|---|---|
| 1 | Unknown | David Allison | 30 September 2026 | N/A |
| 2 | Unknown | Unknown | 7 October 2026 | N/A |
| 3 | Unknown | Unknown | 14 October 2026 | N/A |
| 4 | TBA | TBA | 21 October 2026 | TBD |
| 5 | TBA | TBA | 4 November 2026 | TBD |
| 6 | TBA | TBA | 11 November 2026 | TBD |

== Release ==
The series premiered on ITV and ITVX on 30 September 2026.

== Reception ==
The Guardian praised the production values with "the direction, soundtrack and lighting conspiring to paint Bristol as a glowering storm cloud" and that "even the many, many ridiculous bits work, folded as they are into a soufflé that is as ferociously watchable as it is unnecessarily expensive". Anita Singh in The Daily Telegraph wrote that the series "wants to be serious but is unintentionally hilarious" and that it may be "daft, but it works, because the whole thing is done with confidence and commitment from the cast".
