= Joy Ellis =

English writer

- Born: Joy Ellis; Kent, England, United Kingdom
- Occupation: Writer
- Writing career
- Period: 2010–present
- Genres: Fiction, crime, thriller
- Notable work: DI Nikki Galena Series
- Website: www.joyellisbooks.com

Joy Ellis is an English crime writer. She is the author of the DI Nikki Galena series, the DI Jackman and DS Marie Evans series, and the Detective Matt Ballard series of crime thrillers. In 2018 she was named Audible's Breakthrough Crime Writer of the Year.

== Biography ==
Ellis was born in Kent, England, but spent most of her adult life in London and Surrey. She worked as an apprentice florist, ran a florist shop in Weybridge, and was a bookshop manager. She took part in a writers' workshop in Greece, and was encouraged by Sue Townsend, her tutor, to write seriously.

Ellis is married to her partner, Jacqueline, who is a retired police officer, and they live in the Lincolnshire Fens with several Springer spaniels.

Her books are all published by UK publisher, Joffe Books.

== Awards ==
- 2019 Audie Awards finalist, Thriller/Suspense category: Their Lost Daughters, narrated by Richard Armitage, and published by Audible Studios
- 2021 The Patient Man shortlisted for Crime and Thriller Book of The Year at the British Book Awards.

== Novels ==
=== DI Nikki Galena series ===
Order	Title	Year
1	Crime on the Fens (orig. Mask Wars)	2010
2	Shadow on the Fens (orig. Shadowbreaker)	2011
3	Hunted on the Fens	2016
4	Killer on the Fens	2016
5	Stalker on the Fens	2016
6	Captive on the Fens	2017
7	Buried on the Fens	2017
8	Thieves on the Fens	2017
9	Fire on the Fens	2018
10	Darkness on the Fens	2019
11	Hidden on the Fens	2020
12	Secrets on the Fens	2021
13	Fear on the Fens	2021
14	Graves on the Fens	2022
15	Echoes on the Fens	2024

=== DI Rowan Jackman & DS Marie Evans series ===
Order	Title	Year
1	The Murderer's Son	2016
2	Their Lost Daughters	2017
3	The Fourth Friend	2017
4	The Guilty Ones	2018
5	The Stolen boys	2018
6	The Patient Man	2019
7	They Disappeared	2020
8	The Night Thief	2021
9	Solace House	2022
10	The River's Edge	2023
11	Black Notice	2024

=== Detective Matt Ballard series ===
Order	Title	Year
1	Beware the Past	2017
2	Five Bloody Hearts	2019
3	The Dying Light	2020
4	Marshlight	2021
5	Trick of the Night	2022
6	The Bag of Secrets	2023

=== Other books ===
Order	Title	Year
1	Guide Star	2017
2	Guard Her with Your Life	2023
3	An Aura of Mystery	2024
4	The Colour of Mystery	2024
