= The Silent Patient =

Book by Alex Michaelides

- First edition
- Author: Alex Michaelides
- Publisher: Celadon Books
- Publication date: 5 February 2019
- Publication place: United Kingdom
- Pages: 323
- ISBN: 9781250301697

The Silent Patient is a 2019 psychological thriller novel written by British–Cypriot author Alex Michaelides. The debut novel was published by Celadon Books, a division of Macmillan Publishers, on 5 February 2019. The audiobook version, released on the same date, is narrated by Louise Brealey and Jack Hawkins. The story is narrated by an English psychotherapist, Theo Faber, dealing with a patient who turns mute after murdering her husband. Upon its release, the book debuted on The New York Times Best Seller list at No. 1. It later won the Goodreads Choice Award 2019 in the Mystery and Thriller category.

== Writing ==
On writing his debut novel, author Michaelides, who is also a screenwriter, said, "I was feeling very disillusioned as a screenwriter. I kept seeing scripts being mangled in the production and this sense of frustration made me decide to sit down and finally write a novel." He revised the draft approximately 50 times before finalizing it. The Athenian tragedy Alcestis, by Euripides, served as an inspiration for the plot, while its narrative structure was influenced by Agatha Christie's writing.

Michaelides decided to set his novel in a psychiatric unit as he had worked at one such facility for teenagers while he was a psychotherapy student.

== Plot ==
The plot of the book focuses mainly on Theo Faber, a psychotherapist, and his patient Alicia Berenson. Michaelides describes Theo Faber's traumatic childhood in which Theo is exposed to a violent father and overall neglectful parents. In an attempt to fix and understand himself, Theo takes a degree in psychology and starts working as a therapist. Theo finds the love of his life in Kathy, an American actress who lives in London. Theo feels safe and his relationship means everything to him. While the plot unfolds, it becomes increasingly clear that Kathy is traitorous. The book switches back and forth between narrating Theo's life story, focused especially on his relationship and Alicia's treatment.

Alicia killed her husband six years previously by shooting him in the head five times. The couple seemed perfectly normal, content and happy before the incident. Alicia hasn't spoken a single word since and has thus been moved to a closed psychiatric facility, the Grove. Many therapists have attempted but failed to make her talk. It is evident that Alicia is perceptive to her surroundings, but the reason for her silence remains a mystery.

When Theo applies for a job at the Grove and is accepted, he convinces his superior to let him become Alicia's therapist. He has a profound interest in Alicia and wonders why she entitled a nude self-portrait she creates Alcestis.

Theo's therapy sessions don't show any results at first and Theo's superior contemplates putting an end to them because of the lack of results, but they gradually lead to revelations about Alicia's past. He interviews her relatives and learns that she feared her brother-in-law and used to paint all day long, and that she was present during and survived her mother’s suicide by car crash as a child, her father violently abused her, and her entire family neglected her. Alicia overhears her father confess that he wishes Alicia had died in the crash instead of her mother, instigating hears of anxiety and psychological trauma. In an attempt to let Alicia express herself and communicate, he collects her old art materials from her former best friend and provides Alicia with an art studio in the Grove. Alicia paints a sophisticated painting of the Grove with her and Theo standing beside it. Theo's superior interprets the painting as a sign of progress and allows Theo to continue the therapy sessions.

When Elif, another patient at the clinic who has had conflicts with Alicia in the past, vandalizes Alicia's artwork with the word "slut", Alicia stabs Elif in the eye with a paintbrush. This nearly puts an end to Theo's therapy sessions as the Grove management considers Alicia too dangerous for one-on-one sessions, but Theo convinces them otherwise, and soon after, surprisingly, manages to get Alicia to talk.

At the Grove, Theo receives accolades for inducing Alicia to speak again. Alicia tells Theo her life story, culminating in what happened on the night of the murder, though Theo and the Grove staff think she is lying about the events. The following morning, Alicia is found unconscious in her room and is found to have been injected with a lethal dose of painkillers by someone at the Grove. A police investigation is launched that turns up Alicia's diary.

The diary reveals that Theo is responsible for the murder of Alicia's husband. It details how Theo, driven by hatred, began stalking Kathy's lover, lingering outside his house. Once he discovered that the man was married, he decided to make his wife aware of her husband's infidelity. Theo put on a mask and broke into their house, where he found the wife, Alicia, and told her of the affair. Theo binds Alicia and Gabriel to chair facing away from each other, and makes Gabriel decide which of the two of them he should kill. Gabriel says that he doesn’t want to die, choosing to sacrifice Alicia. Theo shoots at the ceiling, making Gabriel believe he has killed Alicia, and encourages her to be quiet while Gabriel reacts. Theo then free Alicia. After Theo left, the shock of Theo's intrusion and the revelation of her husband Gabriel's cheating and willingness to sacrifice her lead Alicia to suffer a psychotic breakdown. She took Gabriel's gun and shot him five times. Afterwards, unable to accept that she had killed the love of her life, she attempts suicide and vows to never speak again.

The book ends abruptly after an investigator arrives at Theo's home with Alicia's diary and he begins to read aloud from her final entry, incriminating Theo.

== Reception ==
The novel received generally positive reviews from critics. The Independent lauded the book for its plot, characters, and style, writing: "[the book is] vivid enough to warrant devouring it in a day ... the writing is scalpel-sharp and uncluttered, the style spare and concise, uncrowded with extraneous detail." The Guardian concurred, praising its "tight, uncluttered prose" and "skillful building of tension until the novel's shocking denouement". Deccan Herald called it "an intelligent plot coupled with an interesting character study, and finally the impactful punch that leaves you flabbergasted." The Washington Post praised the plot as "fresh" but criticised its "hacky horror tropes, trite scenes and comically shifty red herring characters." Another negative review came from Kirkus Reviews, who panned the book as "clumsy, contrived, and silly ... with a twist savvy readers will see coming from a mile away."

== Film adaptation ==
In July 2026, Sony Pictures purchased the rights to the film adaptation, which will also be produced by Annapurna Pictures and Plan B Entertainment.
