= The Serial Killer's Wife =

British Television series

- Based on: The Serial Killer's Wife by Alice Hunter
- Screenplay by: Suzanne Cowie; Ben Morris
- Directed by: Laura Way
- Starring: Annabel Scholey; Jack Farthing; Luke Treadaway
- Composer: Giorgio Giampà
- Country of origin: United Kingdom
- Original language: English
- No. of series: 1
- No. of episodes: 4

Production
- Executive producers: Andy Morgan; Mike Benson; Chiara Cardoso; Giuliano Papadia
- Producer: Jonathan Phillips
- Production companies: Clapperboard Studios; BlackBox Multimedia

Original release
- Network: Paramount+
- Release: 15 December 2023

The Serial Killer's Wife is a British drama television series. It is produced by Clapperboard Studios and BlackBox Multimedia. Suzanne Cowie and Ben Morris are writers, with Laura Way as director and Jonathan Phillips serving as the producer. It is an adaptation of the book of the same name by Alice Hunter. It premiered on Paramount+ on 15 December 2023. Suzanne Cowie wrote episodes 1 and 3 and Ben Morris wrote episodes 2 and 4.

== Plot ==
Beth (Scholey) is stunned when her husband, Dr. Tom (Farthing), is arrested in front of all their guests and their daughter at his surprise 40th birthday party for the murder of Katie, his office assistant. Whispers about the scandal buzz around her. The following day and a friend cancels a tennis date. Her estranged mother shows up and unsettles Beth further. Wanting to help Tom, she frantically searches his belongings where she finds a letter regarding his firing of Katie and her intent to sue him, plus a text to a friend saying he wants Beth to know nothing. Later, she speaks to Tom on the phone and he asks her to give him an alibi. She also discovers Tom hoards sexually aggressive material on his laptop and has been cheating on her with Katie and others. Panicked, she confides in Adam, Tom's friend, about her suspicions and growing anxieties.

The plot thickens as Beth's past is revealed: she comes from a humble background, is a social climber, and met Tom in a sex club before their relationship blossomed. Meanwhile, the police investigation uncovers Tom's membership in the same club, and a leaked news report exposes his sex addiction, publicly tarnishing his good name.

Despite Tom's attempts to clear his name, the police conclude he is the culprit. However, a shocking twist emerges: Beth marries Adam, only to discover evidence that he is the real murderer. A gruesome trophy box reveals the extent of his crimes, far exceeding the single murder he framed Tom for. She also sees the film that reveals that Adam killed his wife. She finds a paper with a paternity test made by Adam that shows that Adam’s child is actually Tom’s, and that Adam knew this. This breaks the unspoken code between Tom and Adam, and spirals into a deadly obsession, driving Adam to become a serial killer.

Emotionally drained and burdened by her knowledge, Beth decides to take matters into her own hands. Manipulating Adam's trust, she feigns ignorance of the truth and during a secluded hike, pushes him off a cliff, taking him out with the secret. To protect herself and ensure Tom remains in prison, she meticulously destroys all evidence linking Adam to the murders.

In a post-credits scene, Jules visits Tom in prison, telling him that she has some of Maxwell's files on him and that they make for very interesting reading. (Maxwell is Tom's former lawyer and Jules's ex-husband.)

== Cast ==
- Annabel Scholey as Beth Fairchild
- Jack Farthing as Tom Fairchild
- Luke Treadaway as Adam Plummer
- Angela Griffin as DI Aline Edgeworth
- Julie Graham as Beth's absent mother Clover
- Shobna Gulati as Headmistress Kiran
- Hari Dhillon as defence lawyer Maxwell
- Morgana Robinson as Jules
- Livvie May as Katy Asquith
- Gaia Bavaro as Phoebe Alderton
- Natalie Hones as Marnie
- Alara-Star Khan as Poppy Fairchild

== Production ==
In June 2023, it was announced that Paramount+ had commissioned the series with Suzanne Cowie and Ben Morris as writers, Laura Way as director and with Jonathan Phillips serving as the producer. The series is produced by Clapperboard alongside Blackbox Media. Andy Morgan and Mike Benson from Clapperboard are executive producers alongside Chiara Cardoso and Giuliano Papadia from BlackBox Multimedia. It is an adaptation of a book of the same name by Alice Hunter.

=== Casting ===
In June 2023, Annabel Scholey, Luke Treadaway and Jack Farthing joined the cast in lead roles. The rest of the cast were announced in promotional material in November 2023.

=== Filming ===
Filming took place in Folkestone, Capel le Ferne, Saltwood and Hythe, Kent, in June 2023.

== Broadcast ==
The series premiered on Paramount+ on 15 December 2023.
