= The Con Is On =

- Theatrical release poster
- Directed by: James Oakley
- Written by: Alex Michaelides; James Oakley
- Produced by: Cassian Elwes; Robert Ogden Barnum; Dave Hansen
- Starring: Uma Thurman; Sofía Vergara; Maggie Q; Alice Eve; Tim Roth
- Cinematography: Joseph White
- Edited by: Anthony Boys
- Music by: Charlie Klarsfeld; Zach Seman
- Production companies: Grindstone Entertainment Group; Fortitude International; Elevated Films
- Distributed by: Lionsgate
- Release date: May 4, 2018 (United States)
- Running time: 90 minutes
- Countries: United Kingdom; United States; Canada
- Language: English
- Budget: $13 million
- Box office: $221,359

The Con Is On (previously titled The Brits Are Coming) is a 2018 heist comedy film directed by James Oakley and co-written by Alex Michaelides and Oakley. The film stars Uma Thurman, Maggie Q, Sofía Vergara and Alice Eve alongside Tim Roth.

It was released in a limited release and through video on demand on May 4, 2018, by Lionsgate.

== Plot ==
Harriet "Harry" and Peter Fox are a British con-artist couple living in London who plan a jewel heist in Los Angeles, after escaping from a notorious female gangster named Irina. Harry was paid handsomely by a nun who she dealt with during a cocaine deal. After receiving the money, she took a certain amount and played poker with it, while Peter, an alcoholic and drug addict, also spent some of the money on booze and cocaine. Harry and Peter lost all the money, so they flee to Los Angeles to hide out and debate their next move.

After arriving in Los Angeles, Harry and Peter meet up with an old friend of theirs named Sidney, a corrupt Catholic priest who does dirty jobs on the side for extra money. Harry and Peter make a deal with Sidney where he will pay them $40,000 if they manage to transport a shipment of opium. In the process, Peter learns that Irina is not just hunting them for money but also is seeking compensation as she has feelings for Harry and she dislikes Peter.

Sidney secretly contacts Irina after learning about the bounty on their heads. Irina flies out to L.A. with her henchman.

While hiding out at a luxury hotel in Beverly Hills, Peter meets his ex-wife, Jackie, who is now married to Gabriel, a film director, who is also involved in a secret romance with both Gina, one of Jackie's relatives, and Vivienne, a brash Latina actress who is pressuring him to leave Jackie. Attracted by Jackie’s £5 million (around $6.75 million) blue-stone ring, Harry and Peter plan to steal it and give it to Irina to pay her back for the losses of the botched drug deal. First, Harry and Peter visit a forger to make a copy of the ring in order to substitute it for the real one at a dinner party that Peter gets himself invited to at Jackie and Gabriel's mansion. But their plan is ruined by a drunk Gabriel and Vivienne, who interrupt their plans.

After Irina finds where Harry and Peter are staying, they flee from the hotel and hide out at Jackie's mansion where Harry pretends to be a dog whisperer and delivers the wrong message to Jackie.

Jackie and Gabriel attend an awards show where Gabriel wins the award for Best Director of a Motion Picture, but while giving his acceptance speech, he dishonorably calls Vivienne his one true love. Angry and frustrated with Gabriel after their return home, Jackie gets into a big argument with him, Gina and Vivienne which leads to Jackie throwing away the ring and into Harry's wine glass.

Peter and Harry narrowly escape from mansion to the airport after a shootout with Irina and her henchman. During the chaos, Harry manages to wound Irina and gives her the duplicate ring they planned to swap from Jackie with. However, when they arrive at LAX, Harry discovers that they gave Irina the wrong ring, bringing the duplicate with them. Harry and Peter then board a flight to Brazil and fly off, penniless but free from the debt with Irina.

== Cast ==
- Uma Thurman as Harriet "Harry" Fox
- Maggie Q as Irina Solokov
- Sofía Vergara as Vivienne
- Alice Eve as Jacky
- Tim Roth as Peter Fox
- Parker Posey as Gina
- Crispin Glover as Gabriel Anderson
- Michael Sirow as Hans
- Stephen Fry as Sidney
- Wilmer Calderon as Vlad

== Production ==
On May 14, 2015, it was announced that Uma Thurman would star in the jewel-heist comedy The Brits Are Coming, which James Oakley would direct based on his own script, co-written with Alex Michaelides. Kristin Chenoweth would also star, while Cassian Elwes, Robert Ogden Barnum and Dave Hansen would produce. Tim Roth, Alice Eve, Sofía Vergara, Maggie Q, Parker Posey and Stephen Fry were cast in the film on August 27, 2015. It was confirmed that Dave Hansen would also be producing the film, while Chenoweth's involvement was not confirmed. Elliott Michael Smith co-produced the production which was shot throughout Manhattan and Yonkers, New York.

=== Filming ===
Principal photography on the film began on July 20, 2015 in New York City.

== Release ==
The film was released on May 4, 2018, by Lionsgate.

== Reception ==
On Rotten Tomatoes the film has an approval rating of 0% based on reviews from six critics.

Gary Goldstein of the Los Angeles Times calls the film "a stylish caper with enjoyably wry, martini-soaked dialogue and a terrific comedic turn by Uma Thurman as a glamorous British scam artist" but is highly critical of the second half of the film. Matt Zoller Seitz writing for RogerEbert.com gives the film 1½ stars out of a possible 4, saying it is "The kind of movie that seems to think a heap of outrageous details equals a characterization."
