= Passion Play (play) =

Passion Play is a 1981 play by British playwright Peter Nichols dealing with adultery and betrayal, unusual in that the two leading characters are each portrayed by two actors for public speech and private thoughts.

It was originally intended to open the Royal Shakespeare Company's new Barbican Theatre but was produced by them at the London's Aldwych Theatre in 1981.

It was revived at the Leicester Haymarket Theatre in 1984 before transferring to Wyndham's Theatre, at the Donmar Warehouse in 2000 before transferring to the Comedy Theatre, and at the Duke of York's Theatre in 2013.

== Dramatis Personae and Casts ==
=== London Stagings ===
Character	Played by (1981)	Played by (1984)	Played by (2000)	Played by (2013)
Kate	Louise Jameson	Heather Wright	Nicola Walker	Annabel Scholey
James	Benjamin Whitrow	Leslie Phillips	James Laurenson	Owen Teale
Eleanor	Billie Whitelaw	Judy Parfitt	Cherie Lunghi	Zoe Wanamaker
Agnes	Priscilla Morgan	Patricia Heneghan	Gillian Barge	Sian Thomas
Jim	Anton Rodgers	Barry Foster	Martin Jarvis	Oliver Cotton
Nell	Eileen Atkins	Zena Walker	Cheryl Campbell	Samantha Bond

=== Broadway ===
It opened, as Passion, on Broadway at the Longacre Theatre on 7 May 1983, where it closed on 8 August 1983 after 97 performances. The Broadway production was directed by Marshall W. Mason and starred Cathryn Damon as Eleanor, Frank Langella as Jim, Stephanie Gordon as Agnes, Bob Gunton as James, Roxanne Hart as Kate and E. Katherine Kerr as Nell.
