= Alex Michaelides =

Author and screenwriter (b. 1977)

- Born: 1977 (age 48–49); Cyprus
- Occupation: writer
- Years active: 2013–present

Alex Michaelides (Greek: Άλεξ Μιχαηλίδης; born 1977) is a bestselling British Cypriot author and screenwriter. His debut novel, the psychological thriller The Silent Patient, is a New York Times and Sunday Times bestseller, with over 6.5 million copies sold.

== Biography ==
Michaelides was born in Cyprus to a Greek Cypriot father and English mother. He studied English literature at Trinity College, Cambridge.

He studied psychotherapy for three years, and worked for two years at Northgate Clinic Adolescent unit, a mental health service for adolescents experiencing complex mental illness. This work provided material and inspiration for his debut novel The Silent Patient.

== Work ==
Michaelides wrote the film The Devil You Know, starring Lena Olin, Rosamund Pike, and Jennifer Lawrence, and co-wrote The Con Is On, starring Uma Thurman, Tim Roth, Parker Posey, and Sofia Vergara.

"I made three films", Michaelides said of his screenwriting career, "and they went from bad to worse". After meeting someone at a party who told him that, having seen one of the films, "I didn’t expect you to be so interesting", he decided to give up on films and write a novel.

Michaelides' debut novel, The Silent Patient, was the No. 1 New York Times Bestseller of Hardcover Fiction in its first week and was the bestselling hardback debut in the US for 2019. It was a Sunday Times top 10 bestseller for seven weeks. On Amazon.com, it was the No. 2 most sold for 2019 in their list of Most Sold Books in fiction and named as their number one thriller of 2019. It also won the Goodreads Choice Award for Best Mystery & Thriller of 2019, was chosen as a Richard & Judy Book Club pick and as a Book of the Month in The Times. It was shortlisted for a Barry for best debut and Barnes and Noble's Book of the Year. Brad Pitt's production company, Plan B, is developing The Silent Patient as a film.

Michaelides' second novel, The Maidens, was published on 10 June 2021 by Orion Publishing (UK) and on 15 June 2021 by Celadon Books (US). It is a psychological detective story about a series of murders at a Cambridge college. The novel debuted at number two on The New York Times fiction best-seller list for the week ending 19 June 2021.

== Bibliography ==
- The Silent Patient (2019)
- The Maidens (2021)
- The Fury (2024)
