= Venetia (Heyer novel) =

1958 novel by Georgette Heyer

- First edition
- Author: Georgette Heyer
- Cover artist: Arthur Barbosa
- Language: English
- Genre: Regency, Romance
- Publisher: William Heinemann
- Publication date: 1958
- Publication place: United Kingdom
- Media type: Print (Hardback & Paperback)
- Pages: 336 pp

Venetia is a Regency romance novel by Georgette Heyer set in England in 1818. Begun in 1958, it was published that year by William Heinemann, and in the US by E. P. Dutton in 1959.

== Plot ==
The beautiful Venetia Lanyon, thanks to a reclusive and over-protective father, grew up in the country, away from the world with only her younger brother Aubrey, bookish and lame, for company. Her peace and quiet is one day disturbed by the rakish Lord Damerel, who arrives to spend time at his ancestral home next to the Lanyons' house. At first, she keeps away from him, but when Lord Damerel finds an injured Aubrey and not only takes him into his home to recover but also strikes up a friendship with the awkward young man, she revises her first opinion of him and they soon become friends.

When Venetia and Lord Damerel fall in love, however, Damerel is convinced that marriage with him would cause Venetia's social ruin and insists that it would be wrong to inflict this upon her.

When Venetia's older brother's wife and mother-in-law, about whom he had failed to inform the family, descend on the Lanyons, Venetia's domestic situation becomes intolerable and she is invited to stay for a London season with her aunt and uncle as a way to escape the awkwardness and also to find a husband. During this time, she discovers through a chance encounter that the mother she had been led to believe was dead is actually very much alive and had simply left her father for another man when the children were very young. Venetia realizes that this is the cause of her relatives' over-protectiveness -- they are concerned that she might follow in her mother's footsteps.

Venetia, however, still very much loves Damerel and sets about creating her own happy ending, seeking the help of her disgraced and estranged mother to persuade both her uncle and Damerel that the marriage should take place.

== Characters ==
- Miss Venetia Lanyon - the eponymous heroine, lives at her family seat, Undershaw in Yorkshire, 26
- Mr. Aubrey Lanyon - Venetia's scholarly brother, has a diseased hip, studying for a fellowship to Cambridge, 17
- Sir Conway Lanyon - absent Master of Undershaw, educated at Eton, 22, in the -nth foot
- Sir Francis Lanyon - Venetia's father, reclusive former Master of Undershaw, died of a stroke shortly after Waterloo
- Jasper, Lord Damerel - Master of Elliston Priory, known as "The Wicked Baron" because of his rakish behavior, 38
- The Reverend Julius Appersett - the vicar and self-appointed tutor to Aubrey
- Mr. Oswald Denny - aspirant to Venetia's hand, 19
- Sir John and Lady Denny - Oswald's parents
- Miss Clara Denny - Conway's childhood sweetheart
- Miss Emily Denny - Oswald's younger sister
- Mr. Edward Yardley - Master of Netherfold, aspirant to Venetia's hand, an only child who lives with his mother
- Mrs. Priddy - the Lanyons' nurse, an old retainer, bitter rival of the housekeeper
- Mrs. Gurnard - the housekeeper, bitter rival of nurse
- Ribble - the butler at Undershaw
- Powick - steward of Undershaw
- Flurry - Venetia's spaniel
- Rufus - Aubrey's high-spirited horse
- Fingle - Aubrey's groom
- Marston - Damerel's valet
- Mr. & Mrs. Imber - servants at the Priory
- Nidd - Damerel's groom
- Croyde - Damerel's bailiff
- Dr Bentworth - Aubrey's doctor in York
- Charlotte, Lady Lanyon - Sir Conway's bride
- Mrs. Scorrier - Charlotte's mother
- Miss Trostle - Charlotte's dresser
- Mr. Mytchett - lawyer to the Lanyon family and one of Venetia's trustees
- Maria, Mrs. Philip Hendred - Venetia's Aunt, wife of Mr. Philip Hendred, has five daughters and three sons, at Oxford, Eton, and in the nursery
- Mr. Philip Hendred - Venetia's Uncle and principal trustee. Lives in Cavendish Square
- Aurelia, Lady Steeple - Sir Francis Lanyon's 'deceased' wife, mother of Venetia, daughter of General Chiltoe
- Sir Lambert Steeple - a roué and Venetia's stepfather
