= Annabel Scholey =

British actress

- Born: 1983 or 1984 (age 42–43); Wakefield, West Yorkshire, England
- Education: Oxford School of Drama
- Occupation: Actress
- Years active: 2006–present
- Known for: The Sixth Commandment; Walking on Sunshine; Being Human
- Spouse: Ciarán McMenamin (m. 2017; div. 2023)
- Children: 1

Annabel Scholey (born 1983 or 1984) is an English actress. She has performed extensively on stage and is known for her roles in the BBC supernatural drama Being Human in 2009 and as Anne-Marie Blake in the true crime drama miniseries The Sixth Commandment in 2023. She also played the leading role of Maddie in the musical feature film Walking on Sunshine (2014).

== Early life and education ==
Annabel Scholey was born in Wakefield, West Yorkshire. Her father is a retired fireman and her mother is a nurse. She has one younger sister, who is a teacher.

She trained at the Oxford School of Drama on a scholarship, graduating in 2005.

== Career ==
=== Stage ===
Scholey's first stage job was in 1996, when she was 13. She appeared as Louisa von Trapp in a production of The Sound of Music alongside Janie Dee.

Scholey performed several times in Chichester Festival productions, including The House of Special Purpose (2009), Wallenstein (2009), Hobson's Choice (2007).

In 2010, she played Hermia alongside Dame Judi Dench in A Midsummer Night's Dream at the Rose Theatre Kingston, and later that year appeared as Julia in Sheridan's The Rivals, alongside Penelope Keith and Peter Bowles at the Haymarket Theatre in London. Both productions were directed by Sir Peter Hall.

In June 2011, Scholey played Lady Anne, in Sam Mendes adaptation of Richard III with Kevin Spacey in the title role, at the Old Vic theatre in London and the Brooklyn Academy of Music in New York. The production opened to rave reviews.

In 2013, she appeared in the revival of Passion Play by Peter Nichols at the Duke of York's Theatre as the predatory younger woman, Kate. She also worked at the Royal National Theatre in their summer production of Antigone playing the role of Ismene.

=== Television and film ===
Her first role came in 2006 on the television show Agatha Christie's Poirot as 'Miss Sorrel'. The same year, Scholey played Diana Rivers in BBC television adaptation of Jane Eyre. She also appeared in Holby City and Doctors.

In 2009, she played the lead role of Michelle "Midge" Lerner in the BBC Three comedy drama Personal Affairs, alongside Laura Aikman, Ruth Negga, and Maimie McCoy. She played Lauren Drake in the BBC supernatural drama Being Human (2009) and Contessina de Medici in the television series, Medici: Masters of Florence (2016).

She made her feature film debut in 2014, when she performed the leading role of Maddie in the jukebox musical feature film Walking on Sunshine.

In 2018, she began starring in the legal drama series The Split as Nina Defoe. She co-starred in the cast with Stephen Mangan, Fiona Button, and Barry Atsma until the series finale in 2022.

In 2020, Scholey returned to the BBC screens with The Salisbury Poisoning, a series based on the real-life Novichok poisonings of Sergei Skripal and his daughter.

In 2021, she played the major recurring role of Claire Brown in Doctor Who: Flux.

In 2023, she appeared in Janis Pugh's musical film Chuck Chuck Baby. She starred alongside Louise Brealey and Sorcha Cusack. That July, she played Anne-Marie Blake in the true crime drama miniseries The Sixth Commandment. In December, Scholey starred in the miniseries adaptation of Alice Hunter's novel of the same name, The Serial Killer's Wife. She portrayed the titular wife of Tom (Jack Farthing).

Scholey portrayed journalist Beattie Johnson in the 2024 television adaptation of Jilly Cooper's Rivals. The same year, she led the Dead and Buried drama mini series, portraying a woman meeting her brother's murderer again. In November, she joined the season 2 cast of the British psychological thriller series The Couple Next Door.

=== Other media ===
Her work on radio drama includes All Passion Spent, A Harlot's Progress and Under Milk Wood. Scholey was runner-up in the BBC Carleton Hobbs Radio Competition 2005.

In 2011, she provided the voice for Ginny Weasley in the video game version of Harry Potter and the Deathly Hallows – Part 2.

== Personal life ==
In May 2017 Scholey married Northern Irish actor and author Ciarán McMenamin. They had one daughter before divorcing in 2023.

== Filmography ==
=== Television ===
Year	Title	Role	Notes
2006	Agatha Christie's Poirot	'Miss Sorrel'	Series 10; Episode 3: "After the Funeral"
2006	Holby City	Naomi Verity	Series 8; Episode 28: "Judge Not, Lest Ye Be Judged"
2006	Doctors	Lisa Armstrong	Series 8; Episode 35: "Home Truths"
2006	Jane Eyre	Diana Rivers	Mini-series; Episodes 3 & 4
2007	EastEnders	Maddy	2 episodes
2009	Being Human	Lauren Drake	Series 1; Episodes 1–5
2009	Personal Affairs	Michelle 'Midge' Lerner	5 episodes
2012	Family Tree	Lucy Pfister	Episode 3: "The Austerity Games"
2012	Very Few Fish	Claire	Television film
2015	Inspector George Gently	Gemma Nunn	Series 7; Episodes 1–4
2016–2018	Medici	Contessina de' Medici	Series 1 & 2; 13 episodes
2017–2021	Britannia	Amena	Series 1–3; 23 episodes
2018–2024	The Split	Nina Defoe	Series 1–4; 20 episodes
2020	The Salisbury Poisonings	Sarah Bailey	Mini-series; Episodes 1–3
2021	Doctor Who	Claire Brown	Series 13; Episodes 1, 4 & 6: "Flux: Chapters One, Four & Six"
2023	The Sixth Commandment	Anne-Marie Blake	Mini-series; Episodes 1–4
2023	The Serial Killer's Wife	Beth	Episodes 1–4
2024	Rivals	Beattie Johnson	Episodes 1 & 8
2024	Dead and Buried	Cathy McDaid	Episodes 1–4
2025	The Couple Next Door	Charlotte Roberts	Series 2
2026	Apollo Has Fallen	Dr Rachel Moss, microbiologist, code name Apollo	
2026	Winter	DI Lauren Bell	6 episodes

=== Film ===
Year	Title	Role	Notes
2013	One Wrong Word	Denise	Short film
2014	Walking on Sunshine	Maddie	
2023	Chuck Chuck Baby	Joanne	

=== Video games ===
Year	Title	Voice role	Notes
2011	Harry Potter and the Deathly Hallows – Part 2	Ginny Weasley	
2012	The Secret World	Callista James / Catherine Stuart / Annabel Usher	
2017	Final Fantasy XIV: Stormblood	Fordola rem Lupis	
2019	Final Fantasy XIV: Shadowbringers	Fordola rem Lupis	

== Theatre ==
Year	Title	Role	Director	Venue	Notes	Ref.
1996–97	The Sound of Music	Louisa von Trapp		Crucible, Sheffield		
2005	The Real Thing	Debbie	Timothy Pigott-Smith	Theatre Royal, Bath		
2005	The Real Thing	Debbie	Timothy Pigott-Smith	UK Tour		
2006	Troilus and Cressida	Cressida	Peter Stein	Edinburgh International Festival	Part of RSC Complete Works Festival	
2007	The Cherry Orchard	Anya	Jonathan Miller	Sheffield Crucible		
2007	Hobson's Choice	Vicky Hobson	Jonathan Church	Chichester Festival Theatre		
2007	Hobson's Choice	Vicky Hobson	Jonathan Church	UK Tour		
2008	Hamlet	Ophelia	Jonathan Miller	Bristol Tobacco Factory		
2008	The Taming of the Shrew	Bianca	Andrew Hilton	Bristol Tobacco Factory		
2009	Wallenstein	Princess Thekla	Angus Jackson	Chichester Festival Theatre		
2009	The House of Special Purpose	Olga	Howard Davies	Chichester Festival Theatre		
2010	A Midsummer Nights Dream	Hermia	Peter Hall	Rose Theatre Kingston		
2010	Charley's Aunt	Kitty Verdun	Braham Murray	Royal Exchange Theatre, Manchester		
2010–11	The Rivals	Julia	Peter Hall	Haymarket Theatre, London		
2010–11	The Rivals	Julia	Peter Hall	UK Tour		
2011	Richard III	Lady Anne	Sam Mendes	Old Vic Theatre, London		
2011	Richard III	Lady Anne	Sam Mendes	World Tour		
2012	Antigone	Ismene	Polly Findlay	Royal National Theatre, London		
2013	Passion Play	Kate	David Leavux	Duke of York, London		
2014	Mr Burns	Maria	Robert Icke	Almeida Theatre, London		
2015	High Society	Liz Imbrie	Maria Friedman	Old Vic Theatre, London		
2016	The Iliad		Rupert Goold	British Museum, London	Reading	
2016	The Iliad		Rupert Goold	Almeida Theatre, London	Reading	
