= Golden Globe Award for Best Director =

Award

Golden Globe for Best Director – Motion Picture
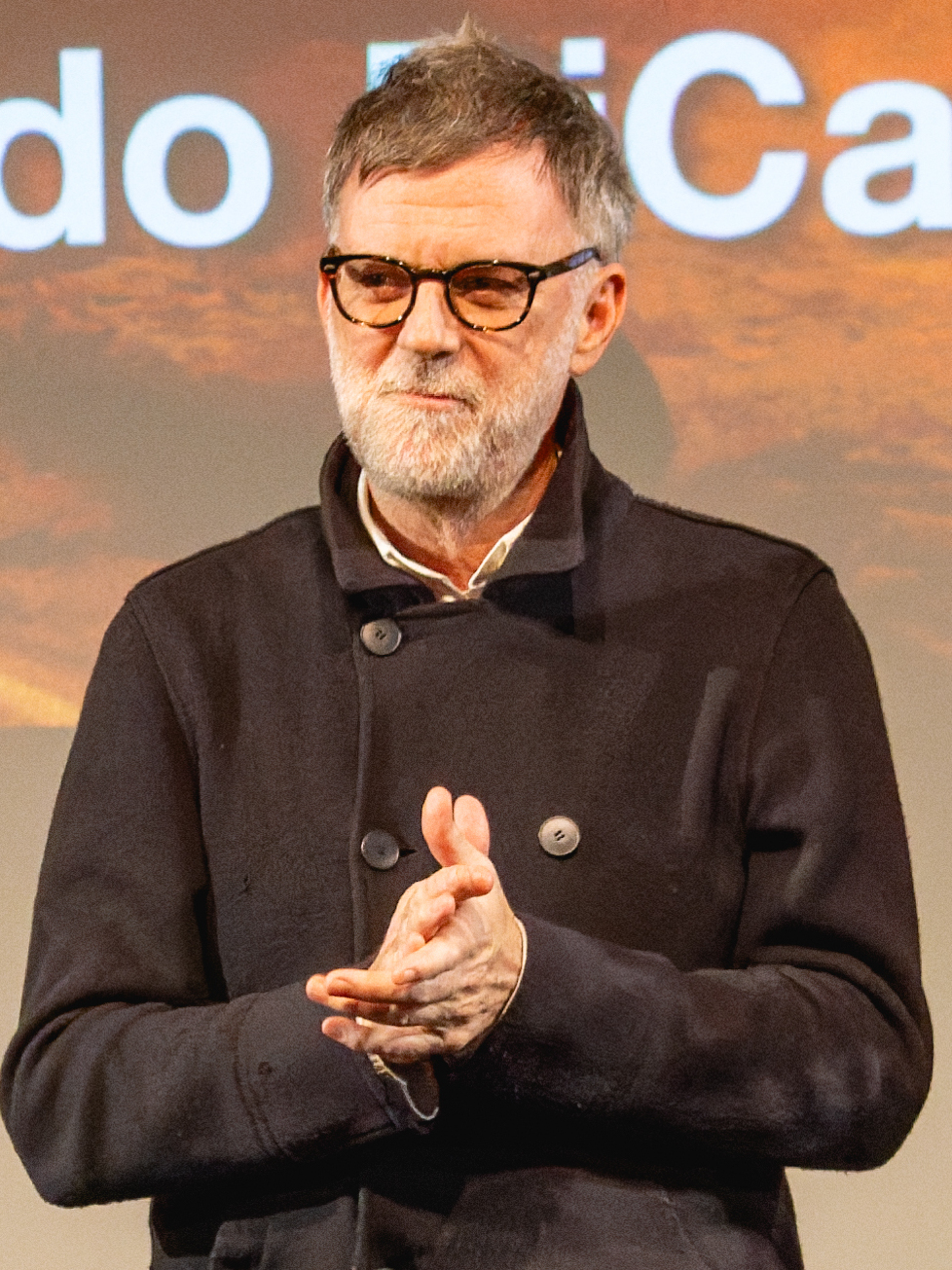
- The 2025 recipient: Paul Thomas Anderson
- Awarded for: Best Director of a Motion Picture
- Location: United States
- Presented by: Dick Clark Productions
- Currently held by: Paul Thomas Anderson for One Battle After Another (2025)
- Website: goldenglobes.com

The Golden Globe Award for Best Director – Motion Picture is a Golden Globe Award that was first presented annually by the Hollywood Foreign Press Association, an organization composed of journalists who cover the United States film industry for publications based outside North America, since 1943 until 2023.

Having won all four of his nominations, Elia Kazan has been honored most often in this category. Clint Eastwood, Miloš Forman, David Lean, Martin Scorsese, Steven Spielberg, and Oliver Stone tie for second place with three wins each. Steven Spielberg has had the most nominations (fourteen). Barbra Streisand, Chloé Zhao and Jane Campion are the only women to have won the award.

Receiving the award in 1984 for Yentl, Barbra Streisand became the first woman to win the Golden Globe for Best Director.

She remained the only woman to win a Golden Globe for directing for 37 years until Chloé Zhao won the award for Nomadland in 2021 and became the second woman and the first Asian woman to do so.

In the following lists, the first names, listed in bold type against a blue background, are the winners, and the following names are the remaining nominees. The years given are those in which the films under consideration were released, not the year of the ceremony, which takes place in January of the following year.

== Winners and nominees ==
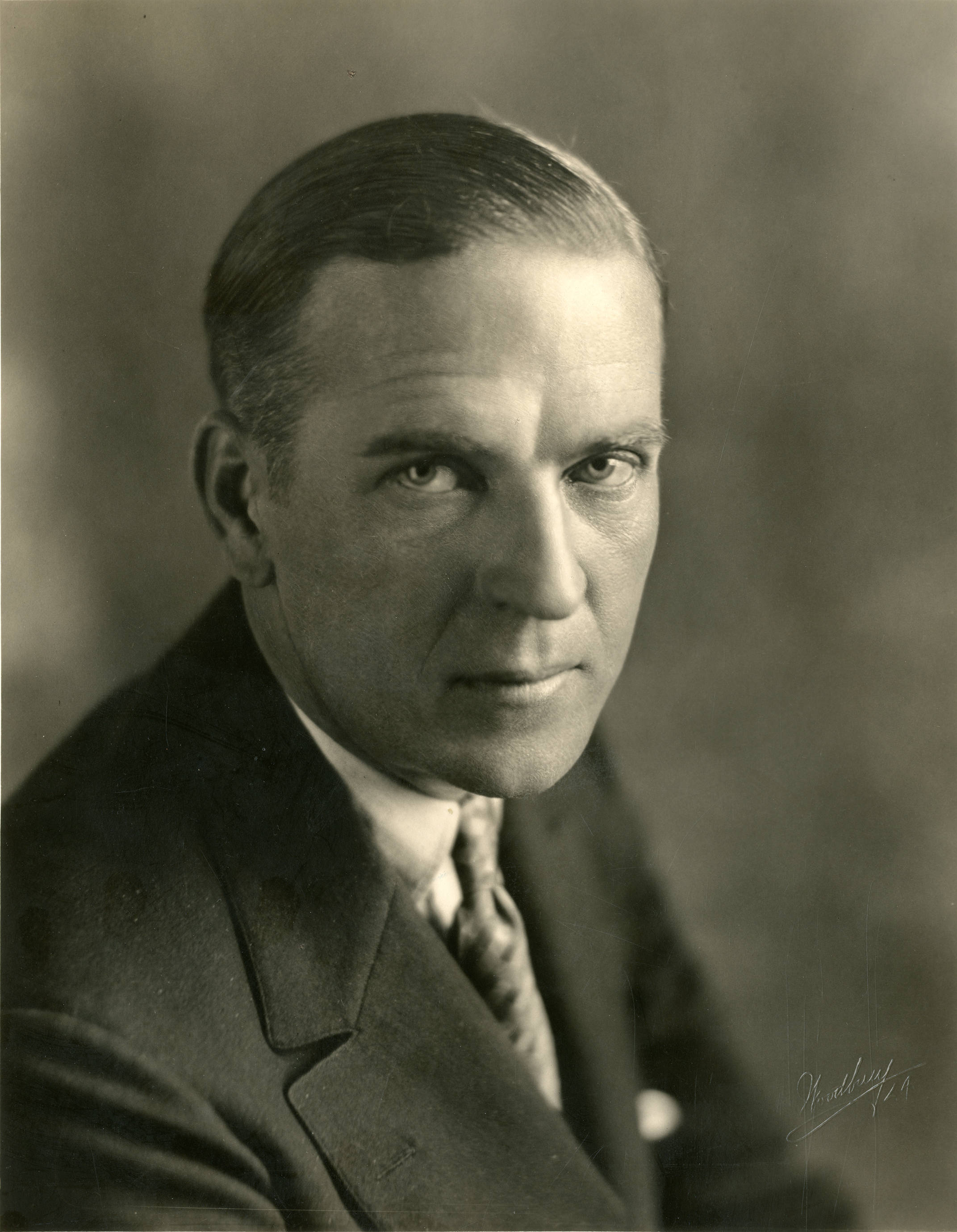
Henry King won for The Song of Bernadette (1943)

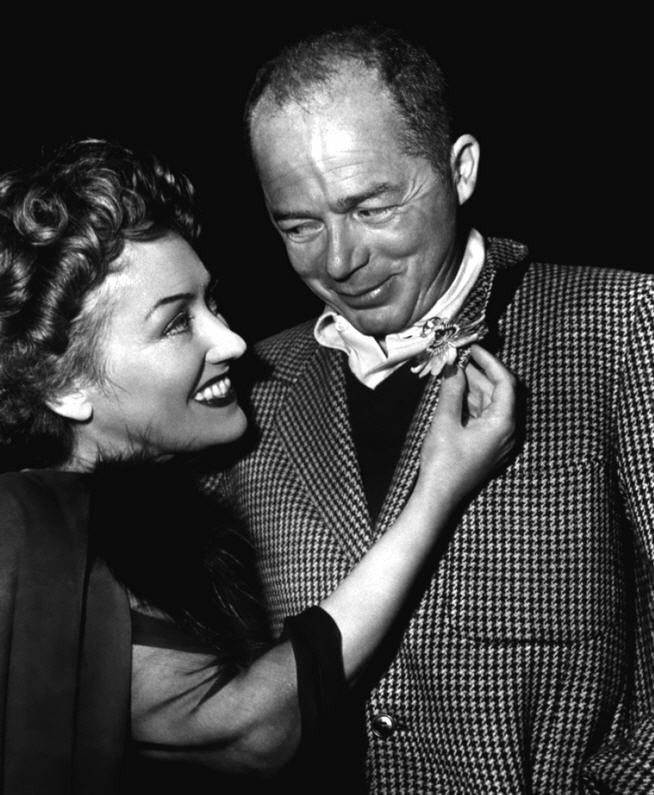
Billy Wilder won twice for The Lost Weekend (1945) and Sunset Boulevard (1950)

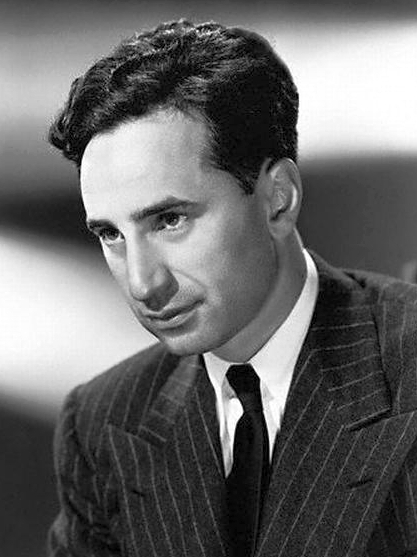
Elia Kazan won four times for Gentleman's Agreement (1947), On the Waterfront (1954), Baby Doll (1956), and America America (1963)

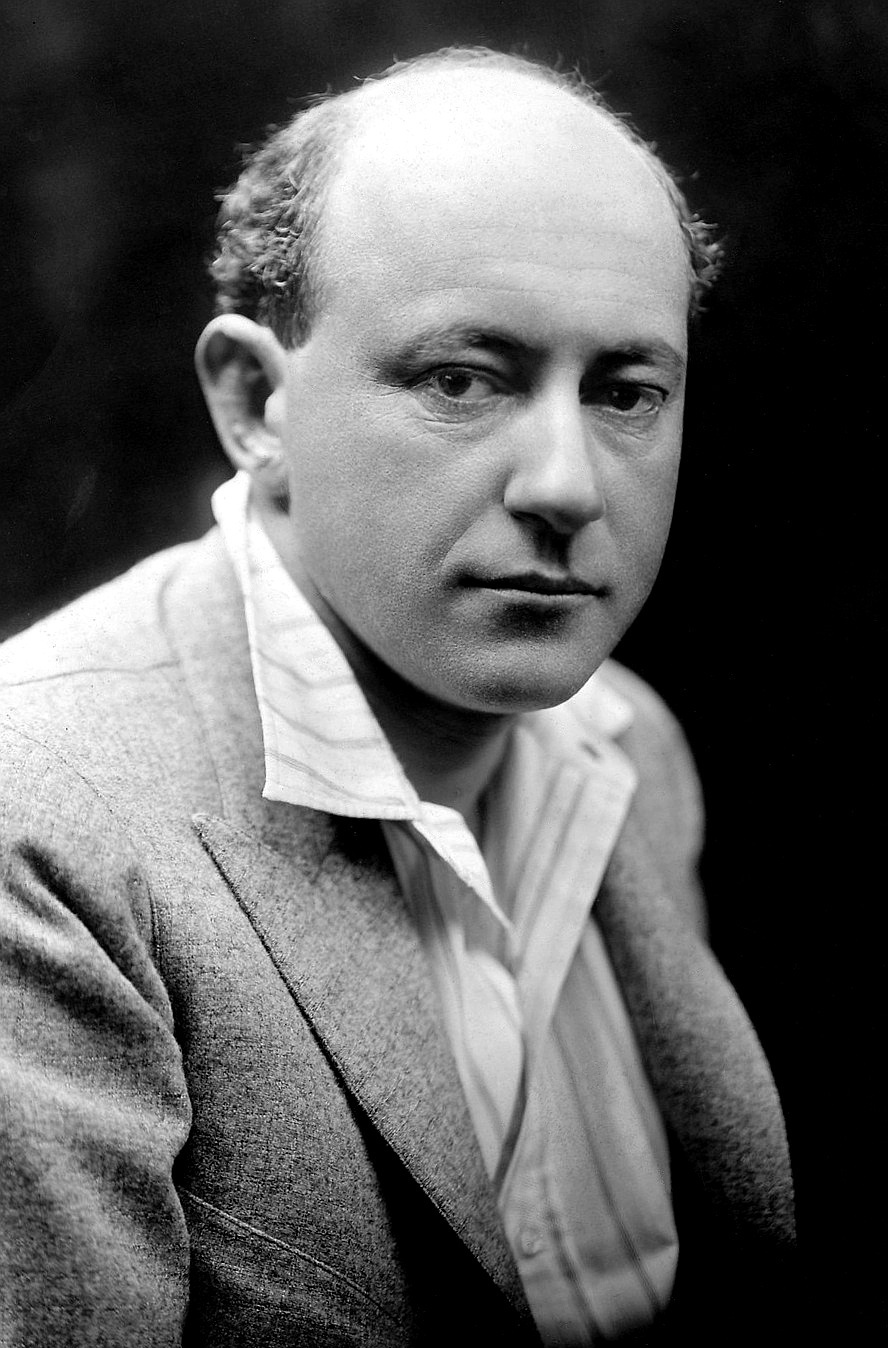
Cecil B. DeMille won for The Greatest Show on Earth (1952)

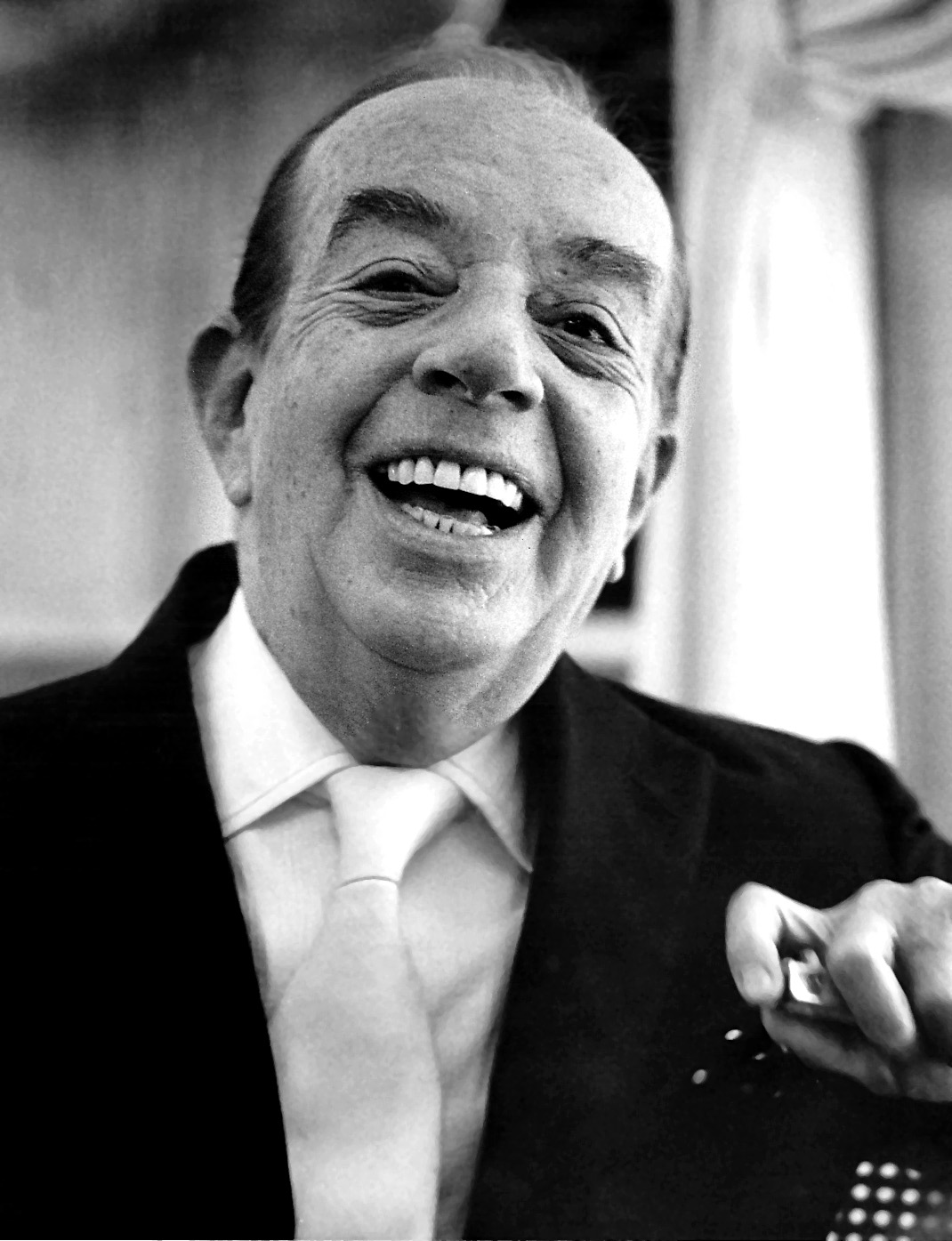
Vincent Minnelli won for Gigi (1958)

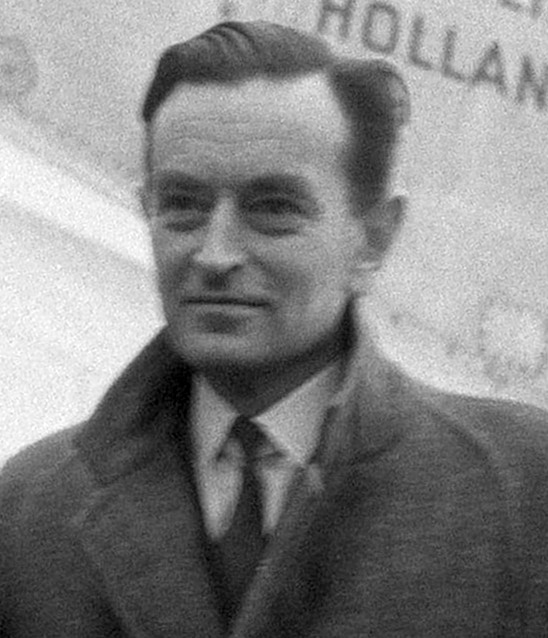
David Lean won thrice The Bridge on the River Kwai (1957), Lawrence of Arabia (1962), and Doctor Zhivago (1965)

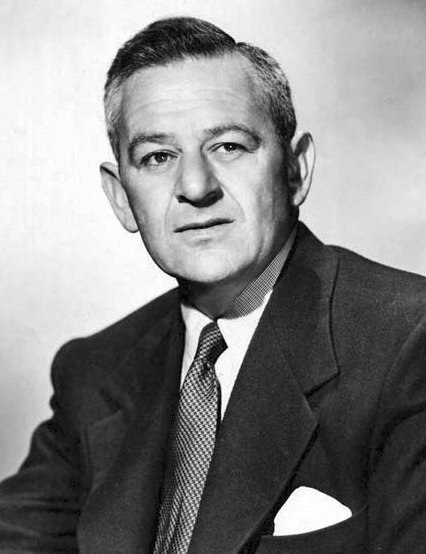
William Wyler won for Ben-Hur (1959)

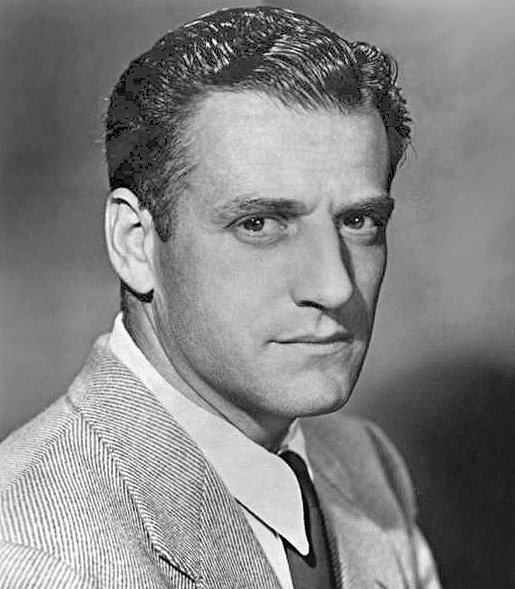
Stanley Kramer won for Judgment at Nuremberg (1961)

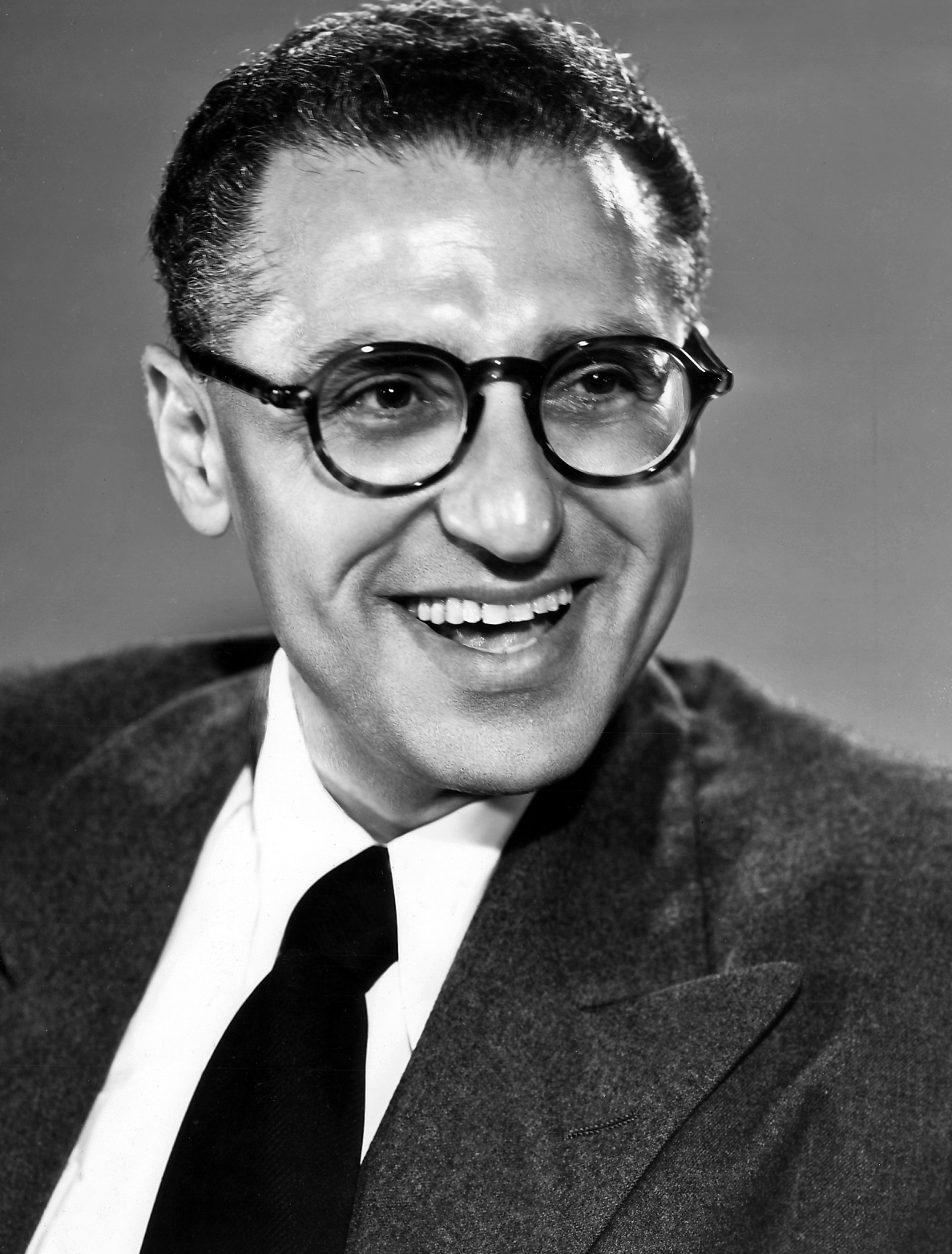
George Cukor won for My Fair Lady (1964)

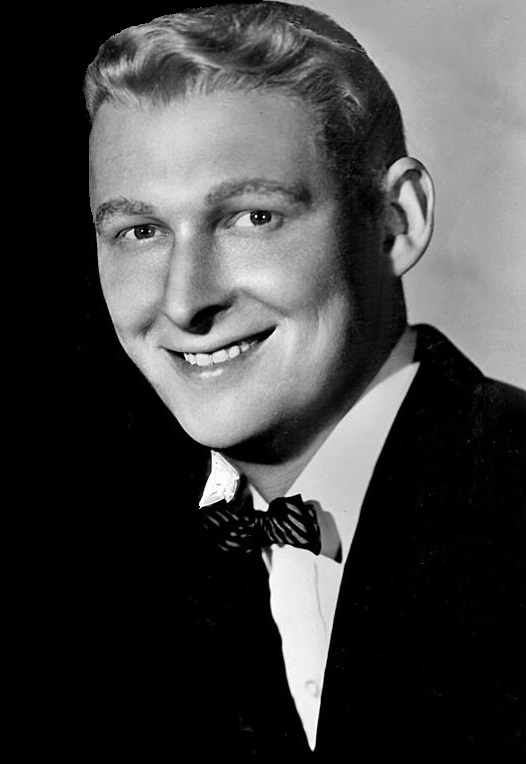
Mike Nichols won for The Graduate (1967)

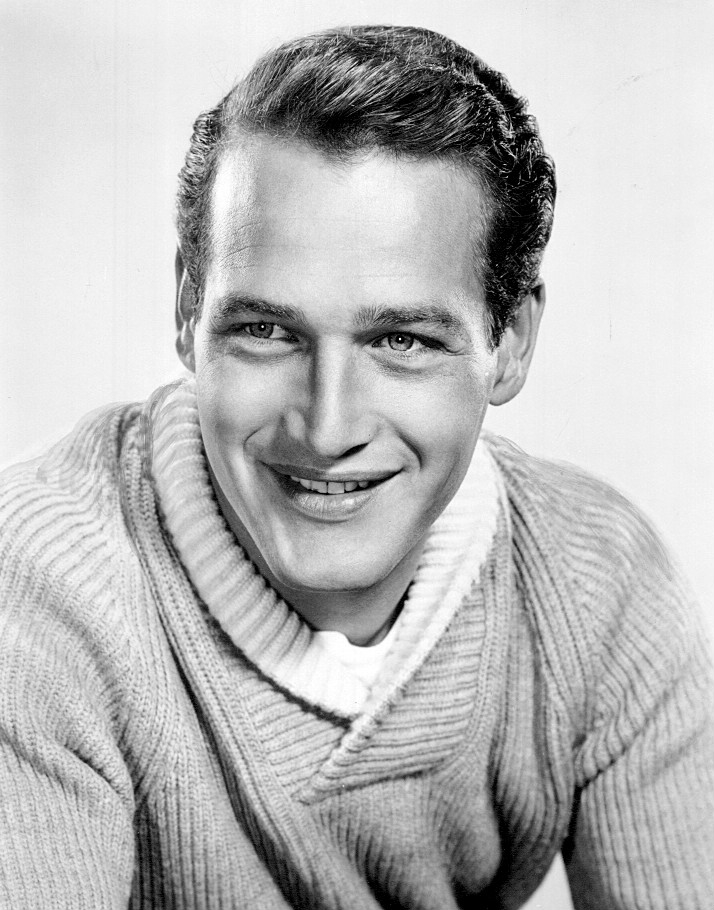
Paul Newman won for Rachel, Rachel (1968)

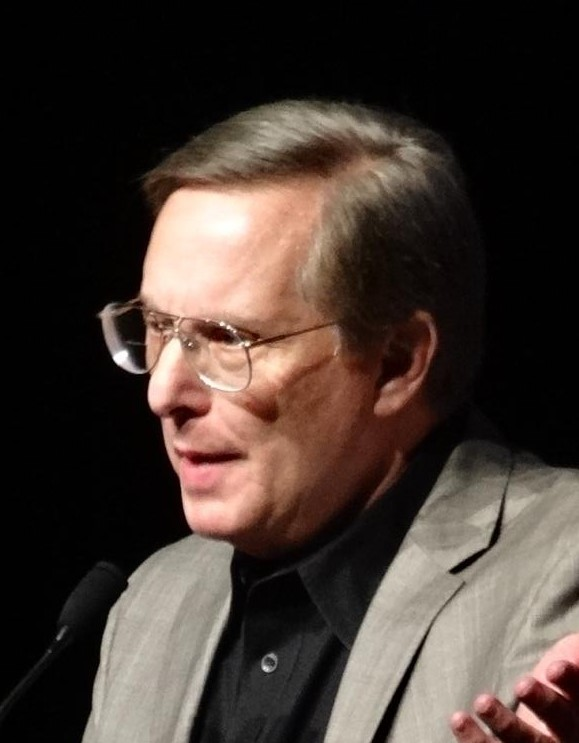
William Friedkin won twice for The French Connection (1971) and The Exorcist (1973)

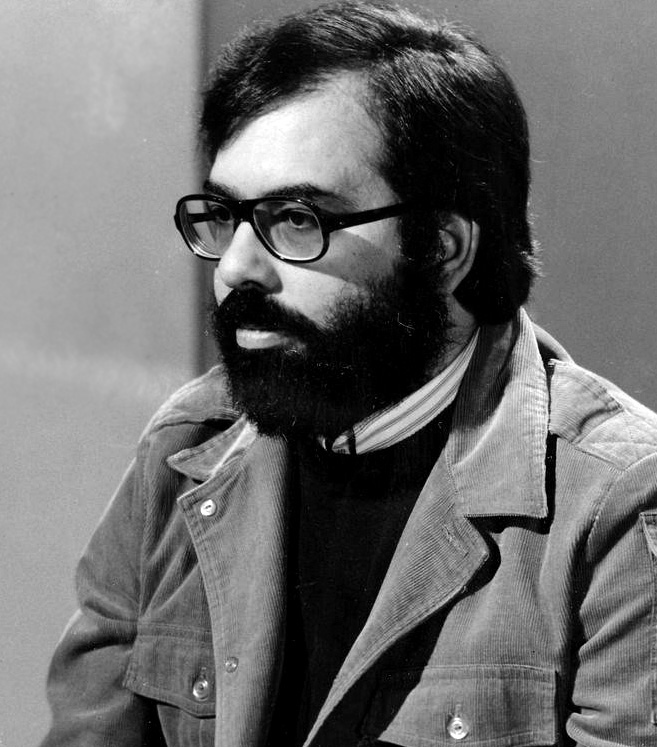
Francis Ford Coppola won twice for The Godfather (1972) and Apocalypse Now (1979)

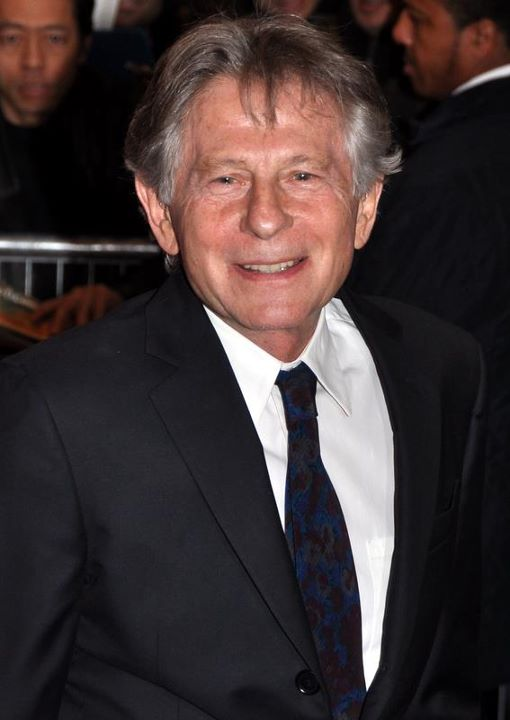
Roman Polanski won for Chinatown (1974)

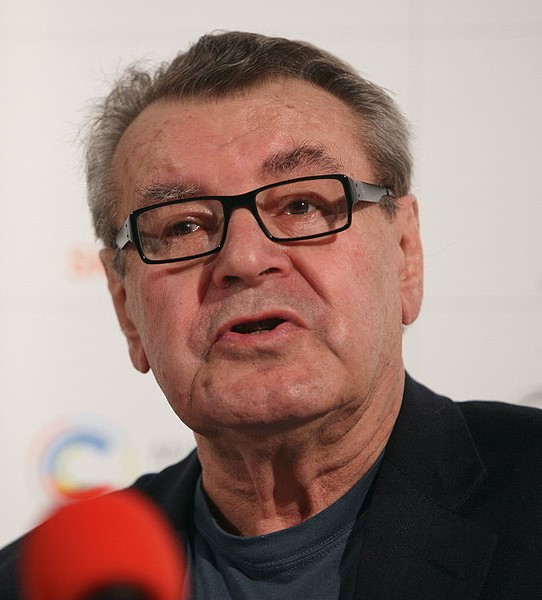
Milos Forman won thrice for One Flew over the Cuckoo's Nest (1975), Amadeus (1984), and The People vs. Larry Flynt (1996)

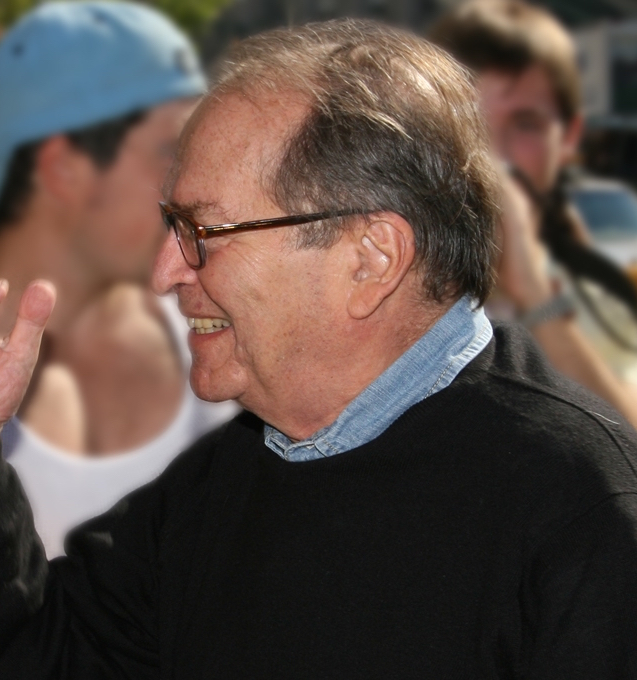
Sidney Lumet won for Network (1976)

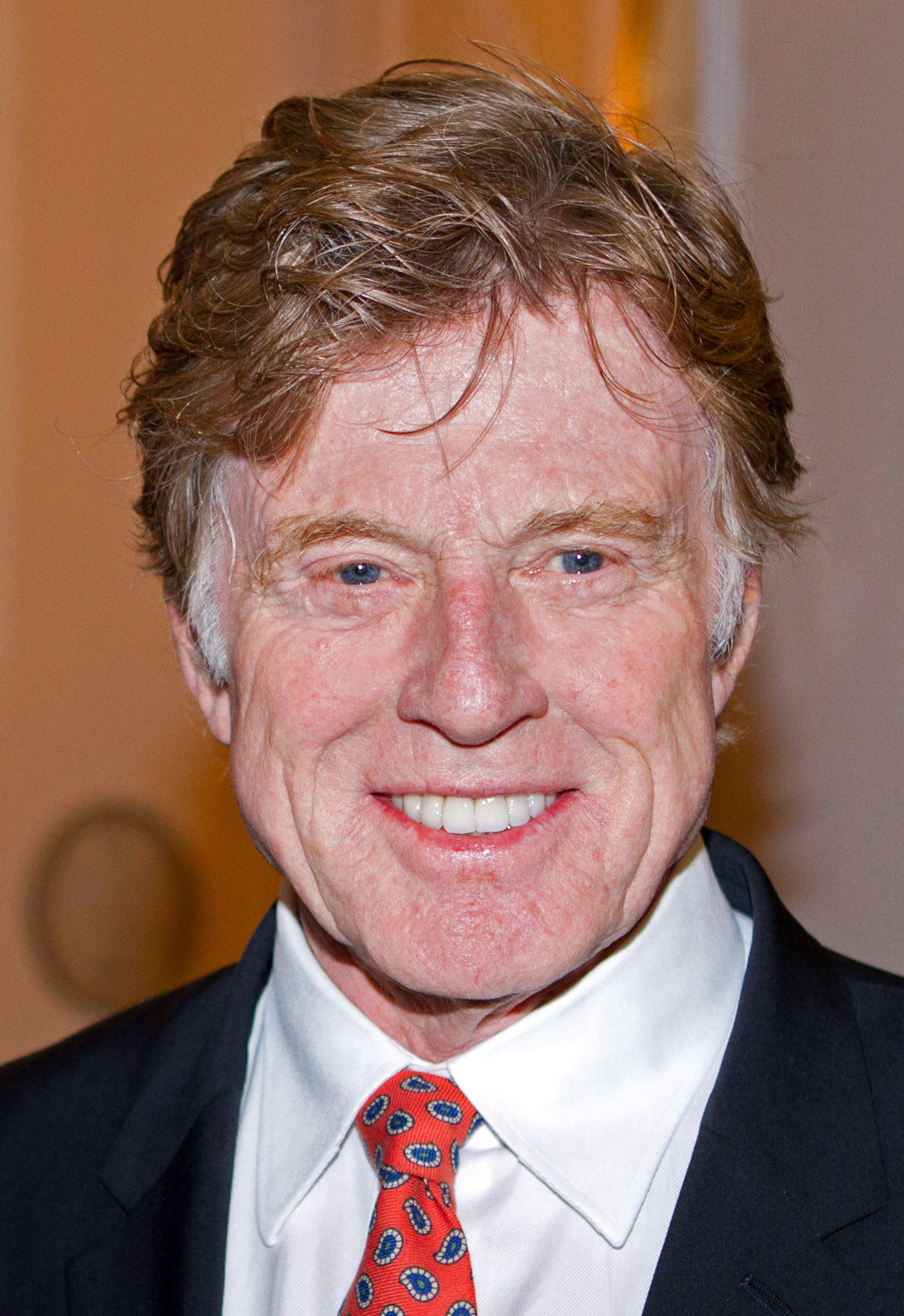
Robert Redford won for Ordinary People (1980)

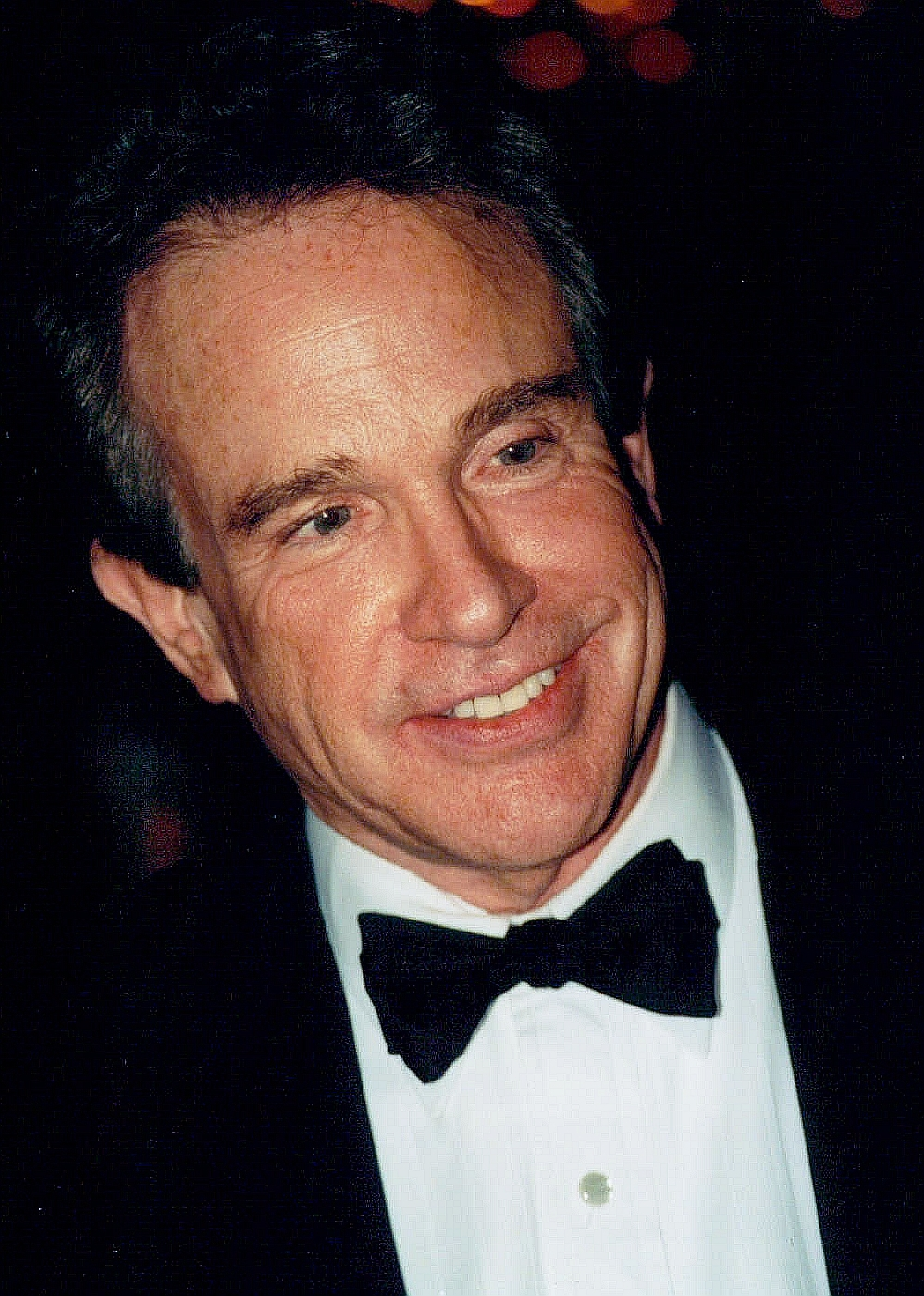
Warren Beatty won for Reds (1981)

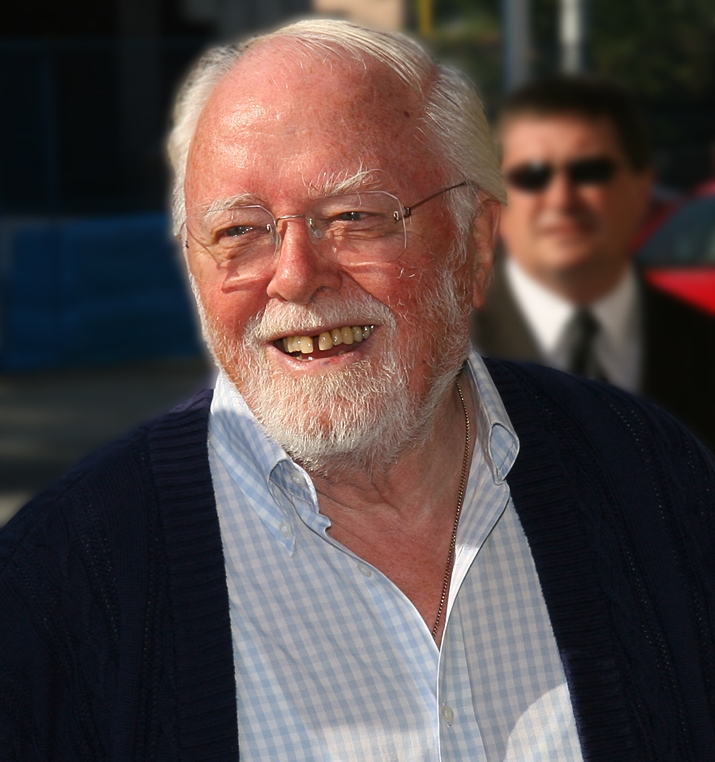
Richard Attenborough won for Gandhi (1982)

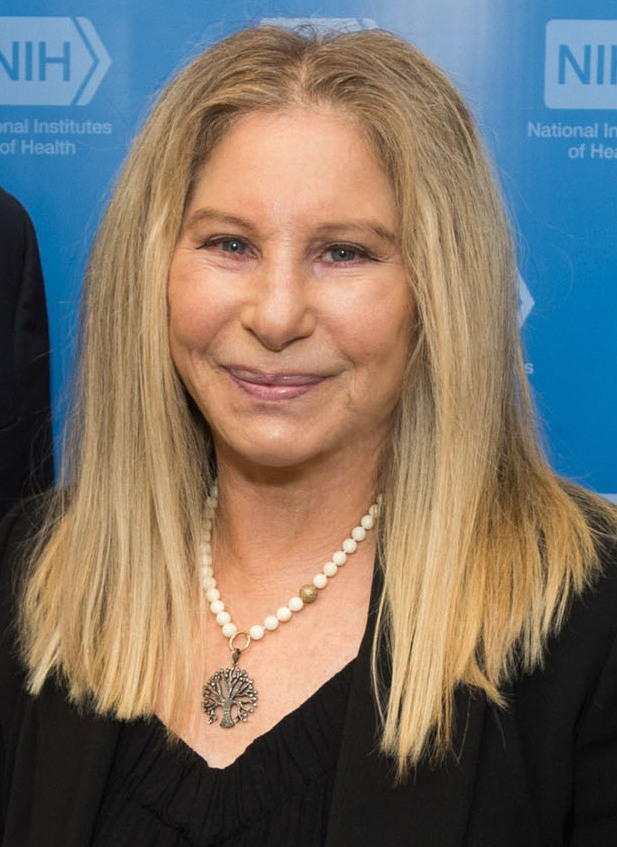
Barbra Streisand won for Yentl (1983)

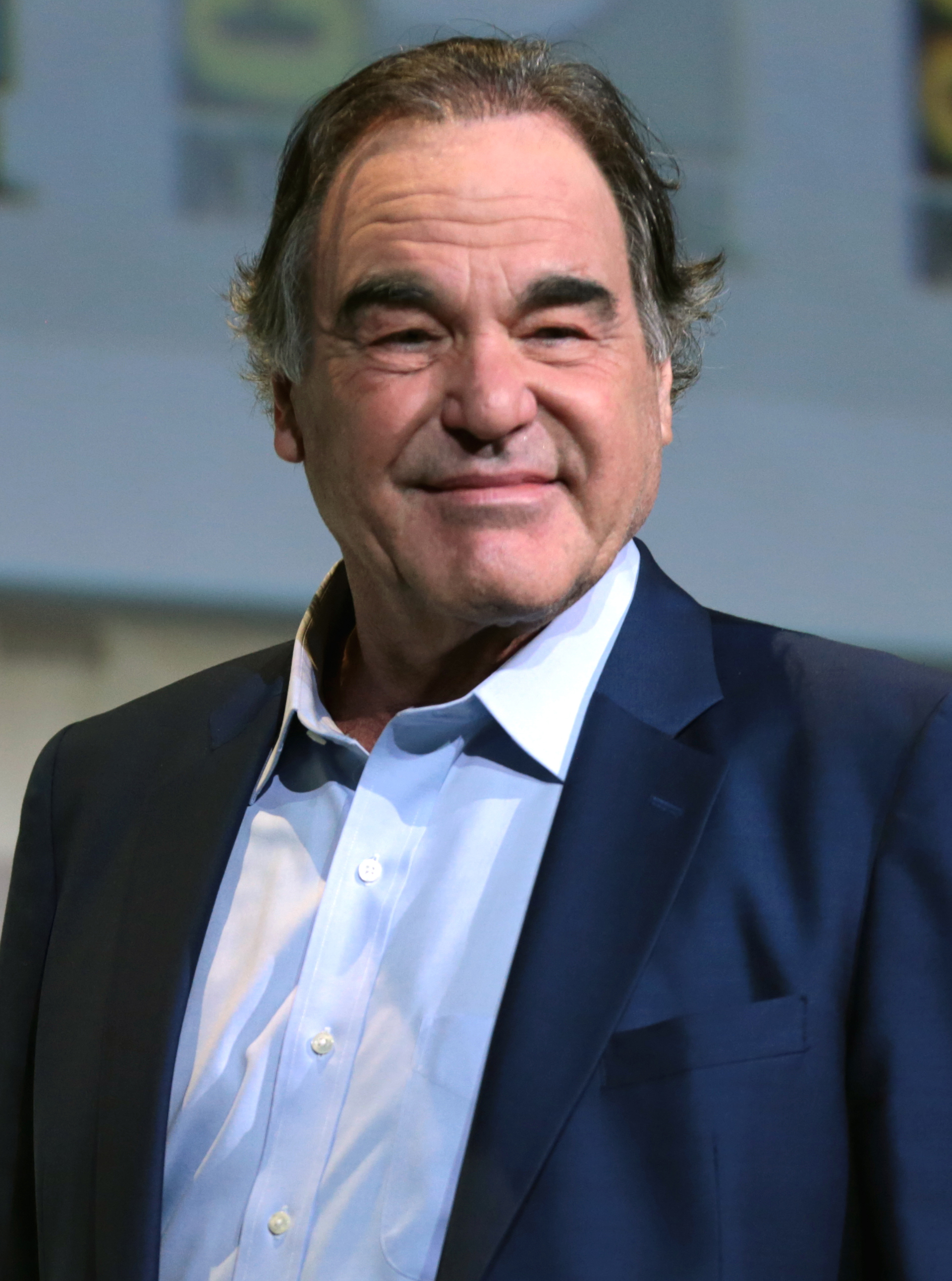
Oliver Stone won thrice for Platoon (1986), Born on the Fourth of July (1989), and JFK (1991)

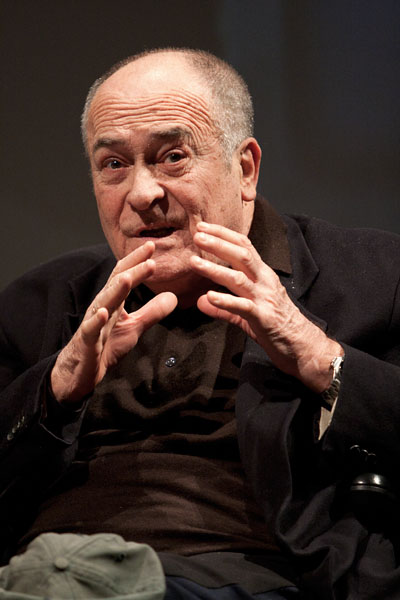
Bernardo Bertolucci won for The Last Emperor (1987)

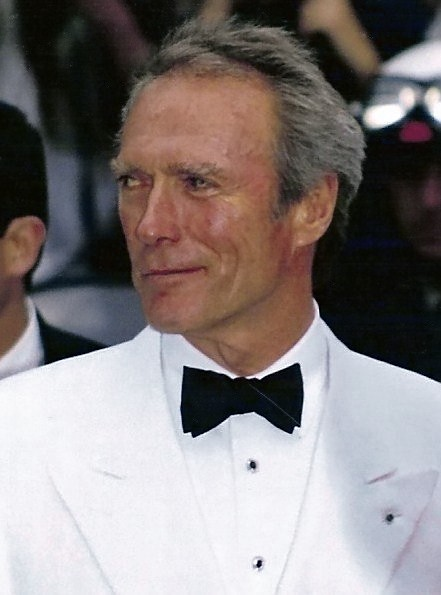
Clint Eastwood won thrice for Bird (1988), Unforgiven (1992), and Million Dollar Baby (2004)

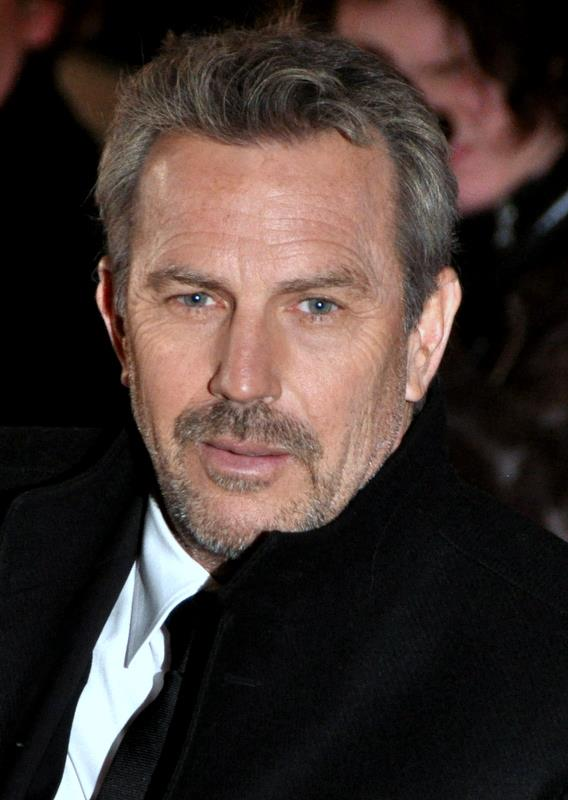
Kevin Costner won for Dances with Wolves (1990)

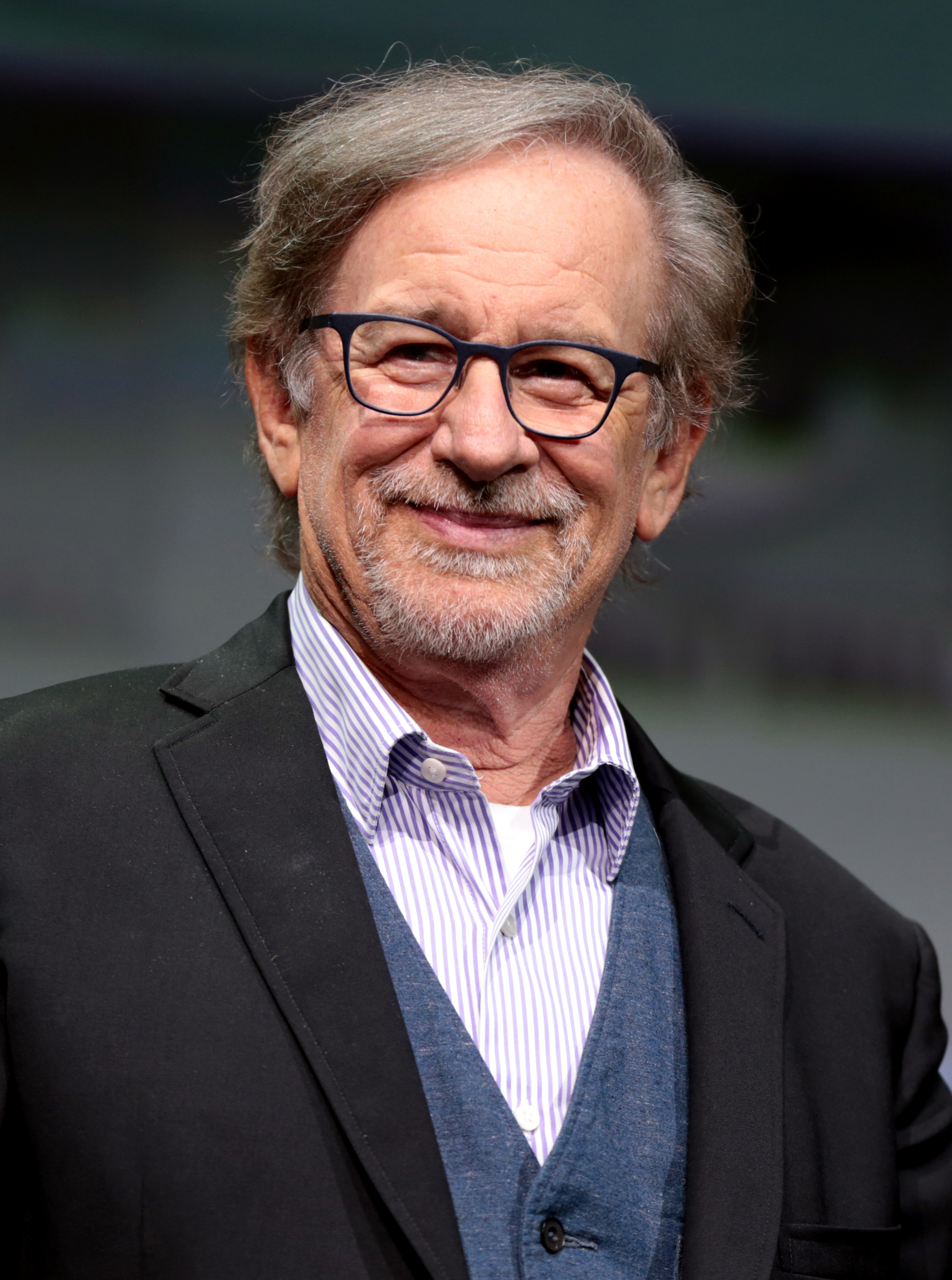
Steven Spielberg won thrice for Schindler's List (1993), Saving Private Ryan (1998), and The Fabelmans (2022)

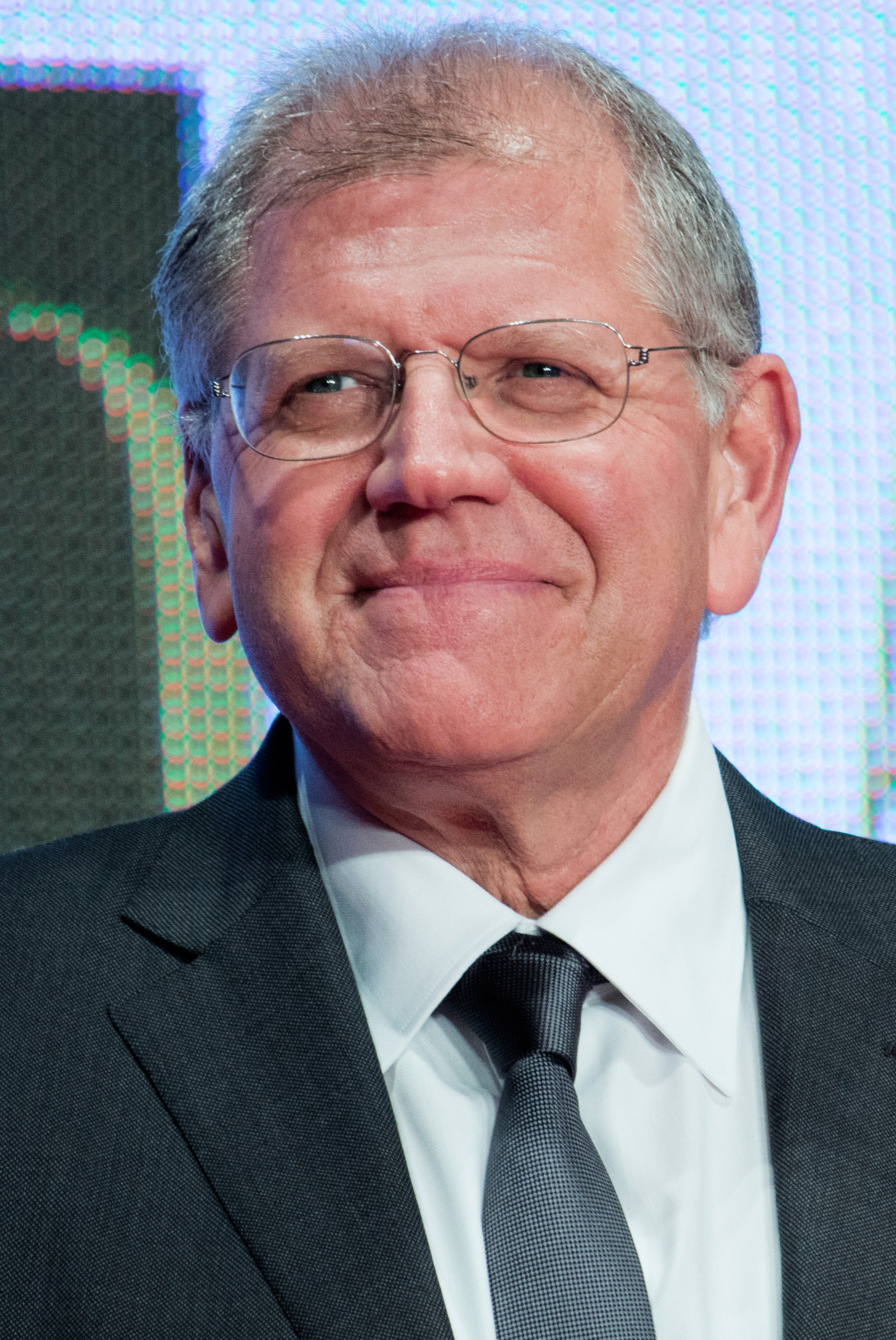
Robert Zemeckis won for Forrest Gump (1994)

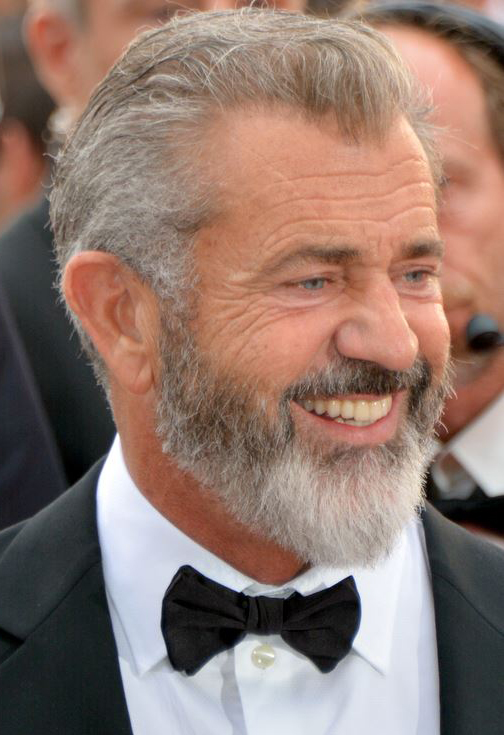
Mel Gibson won for Braveheart (1995)

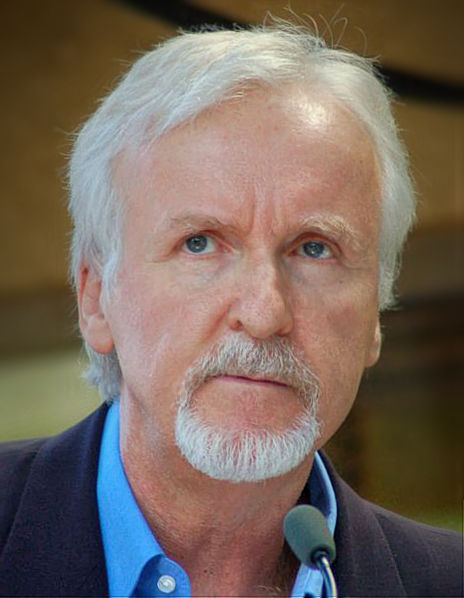
James Cameron won twice for Titanic (1997) and Avatar (2009)

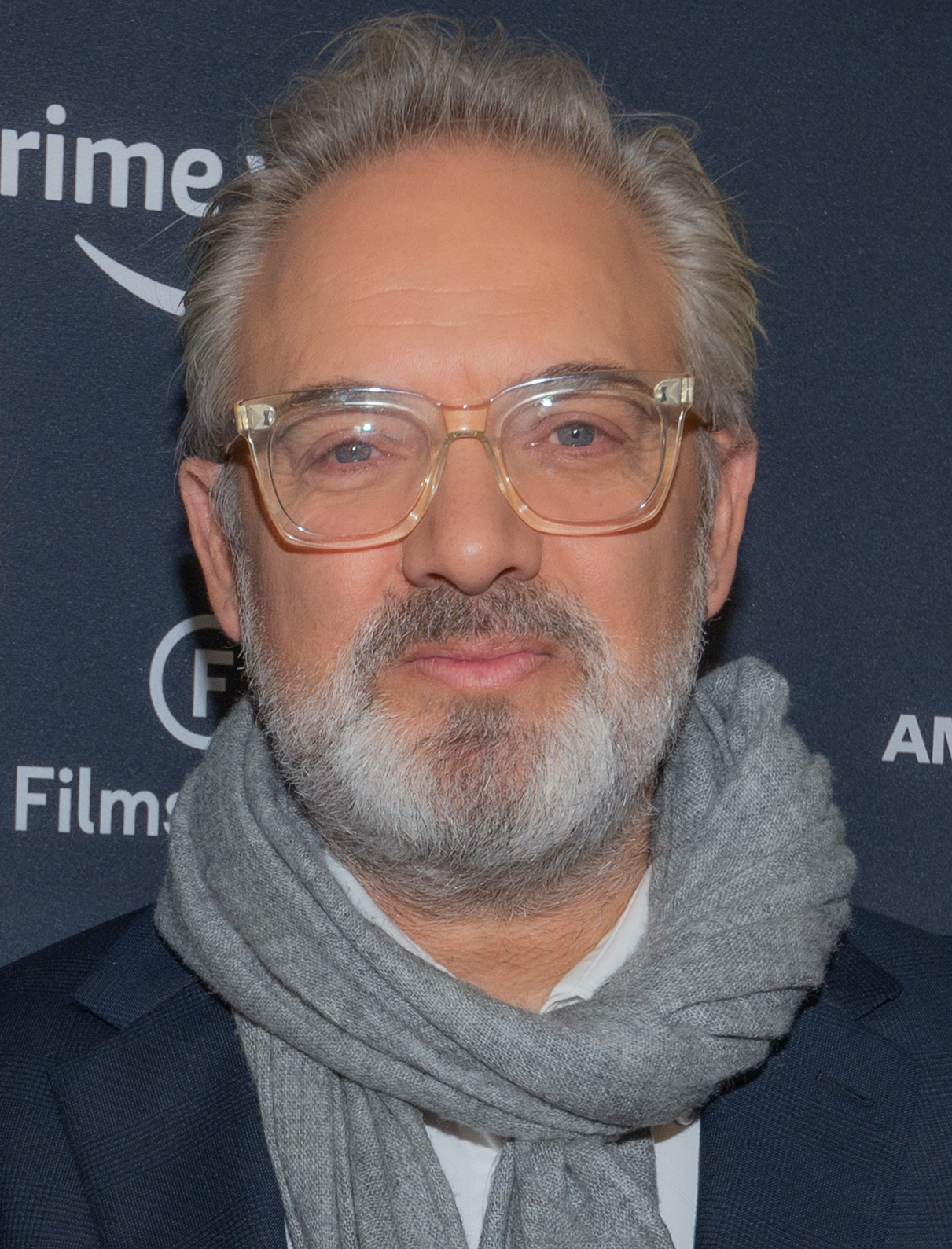
Sam Mendes won twice American Beauty (1999) and 1917 (2019)

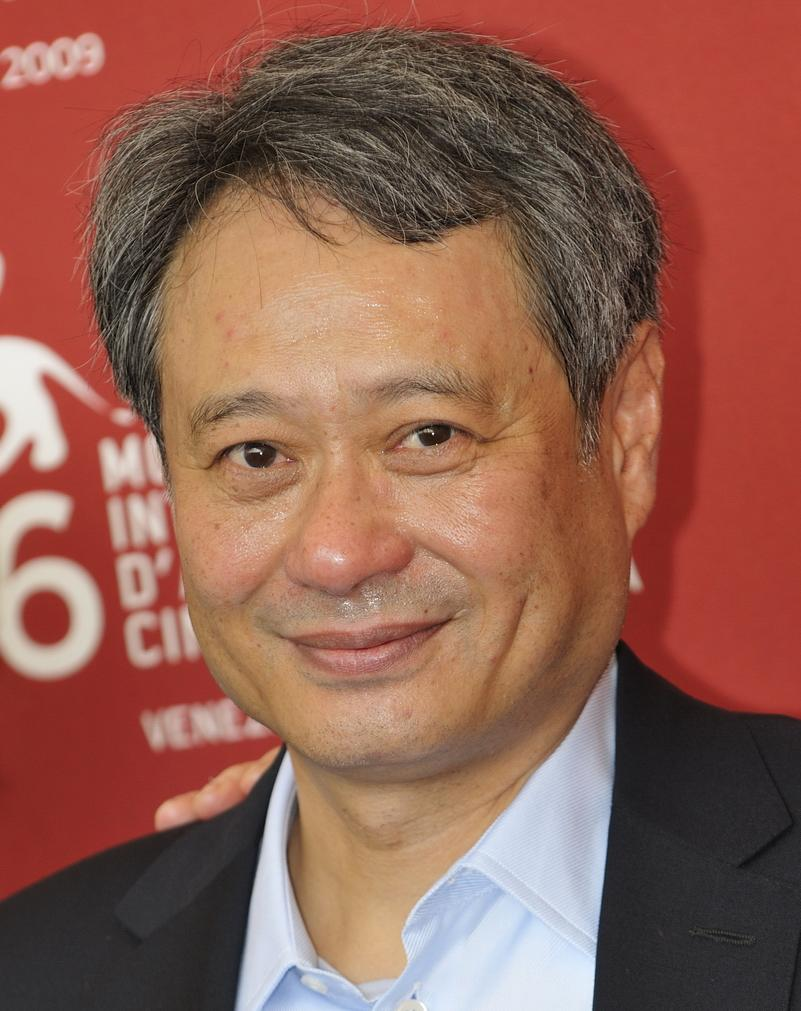
Ang Lee won twice Crouching Tiger, Hidden Dragon (2000) and Brokeback Mountain (2005)

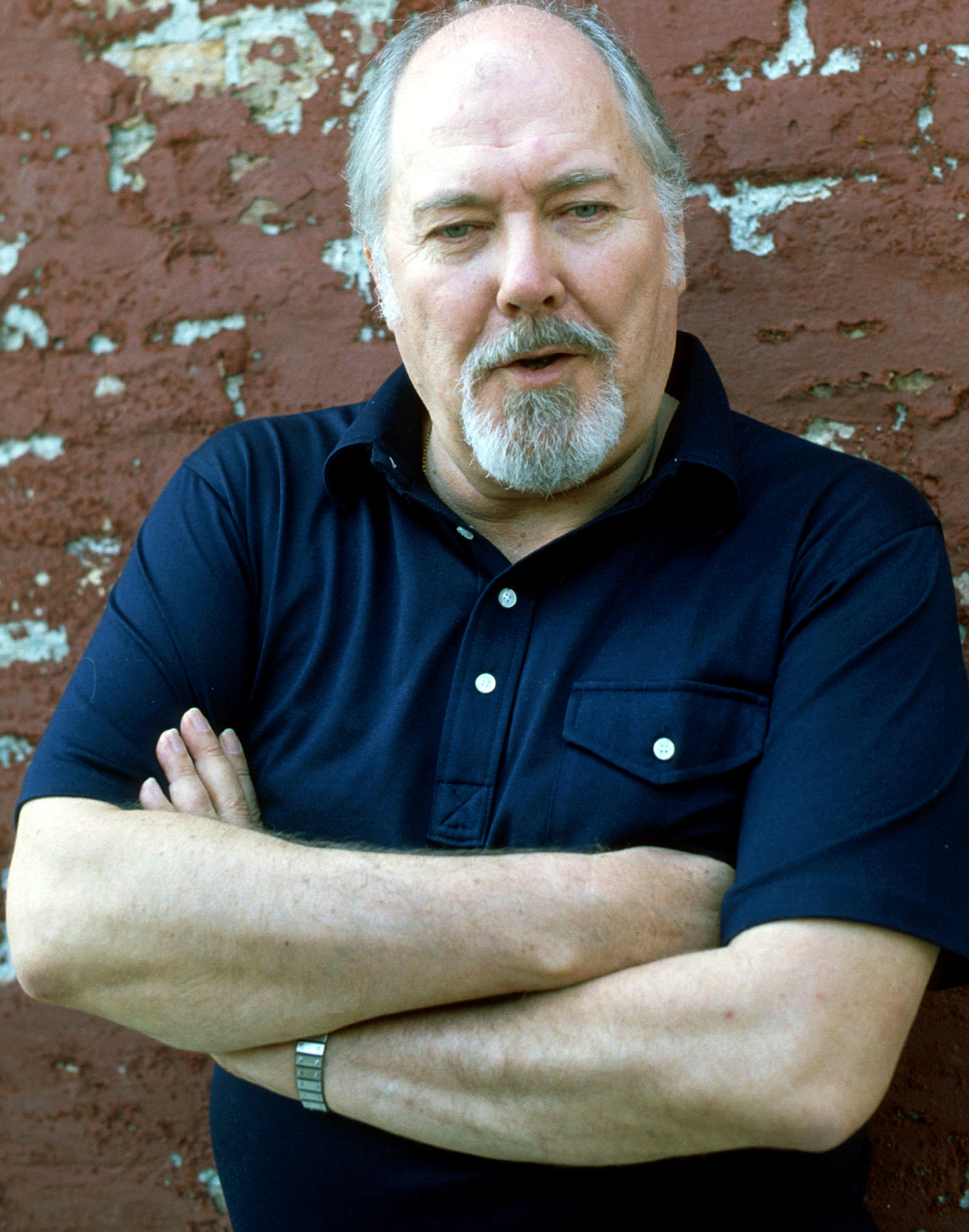
Robert Altman won for Gosford Park (2002)

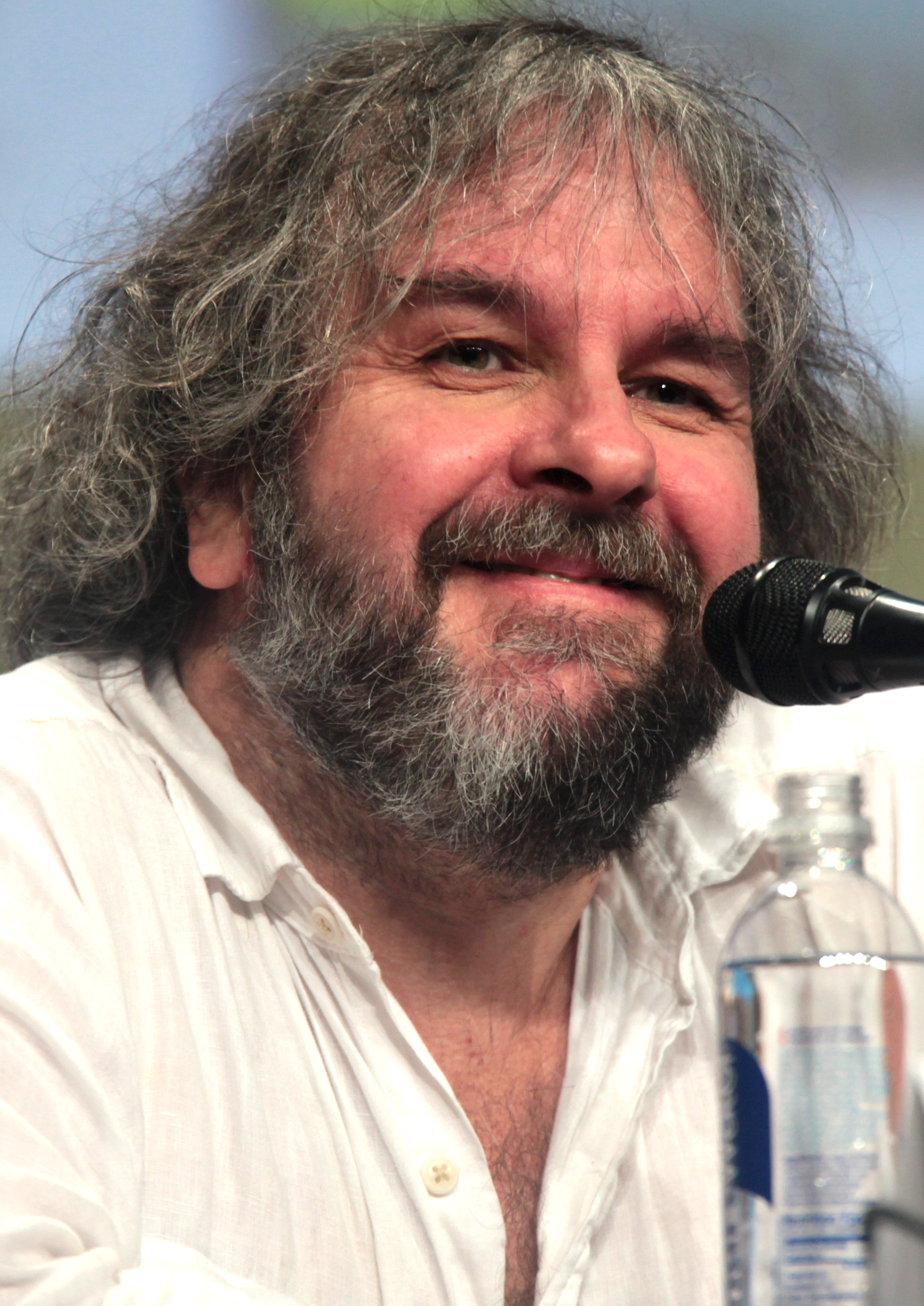
Peter Jackson won for The Lord of the Rings: The Return of the King (2003)

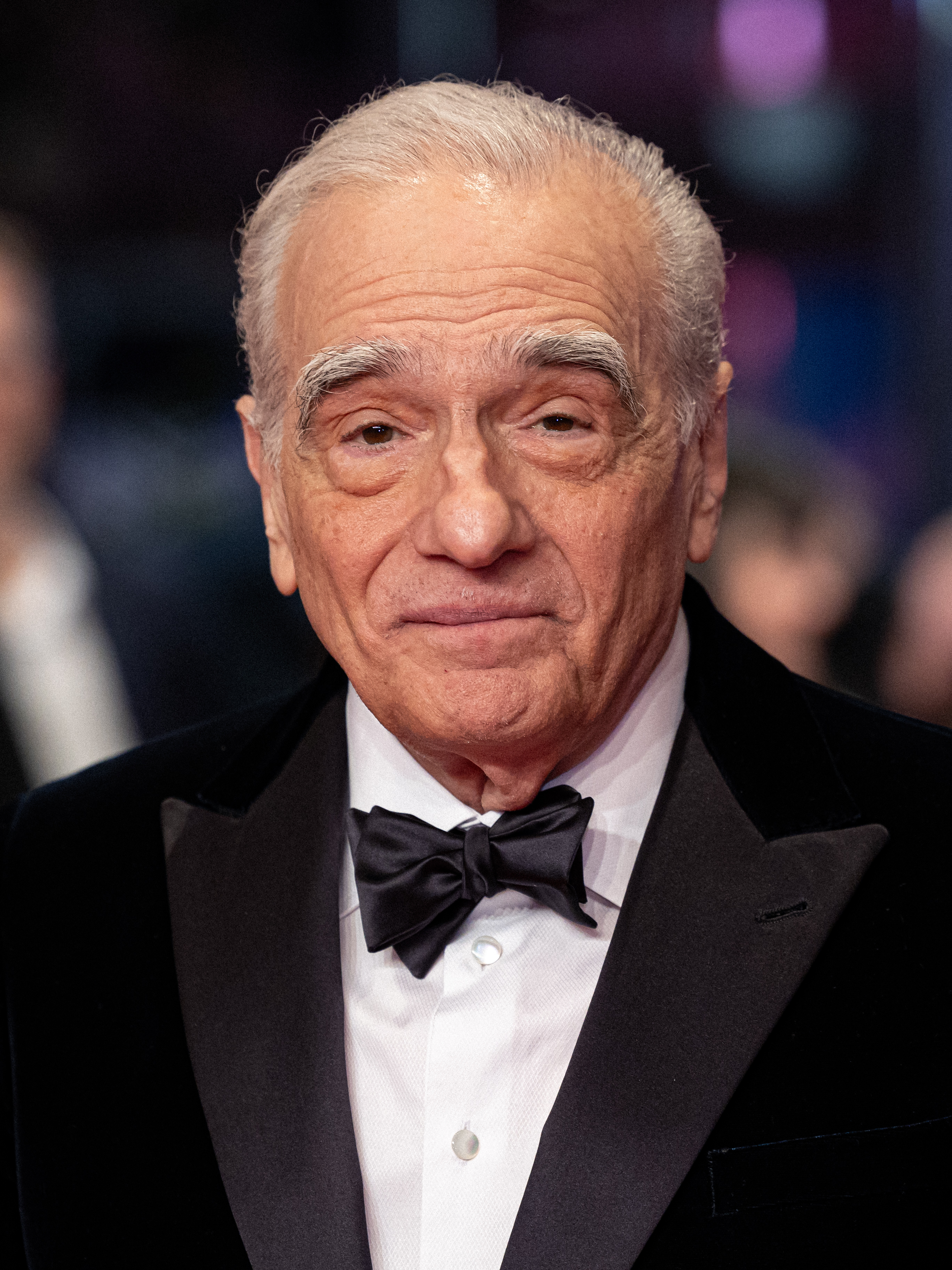
Martin Scorsese won thrice for Gangs of New York (2002), The Departed (2006), and Hugo (2011)

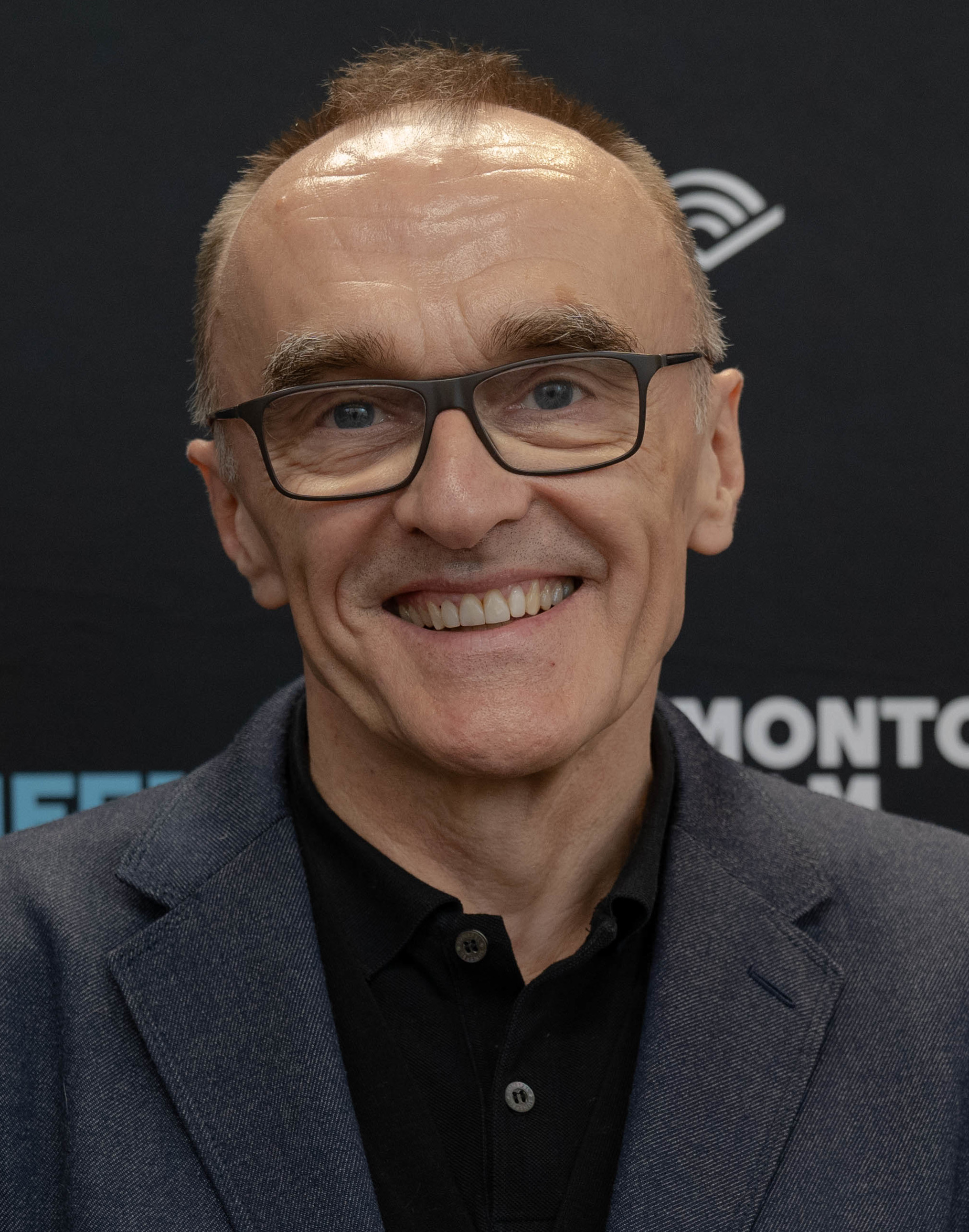
Danny Boyle won for Slumdog Millionaire (2008)

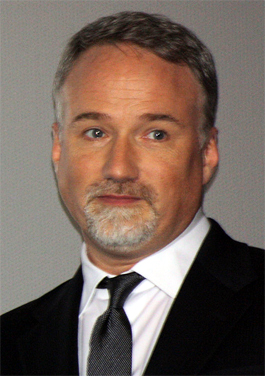
David Fincher won for The Social Network (2010)

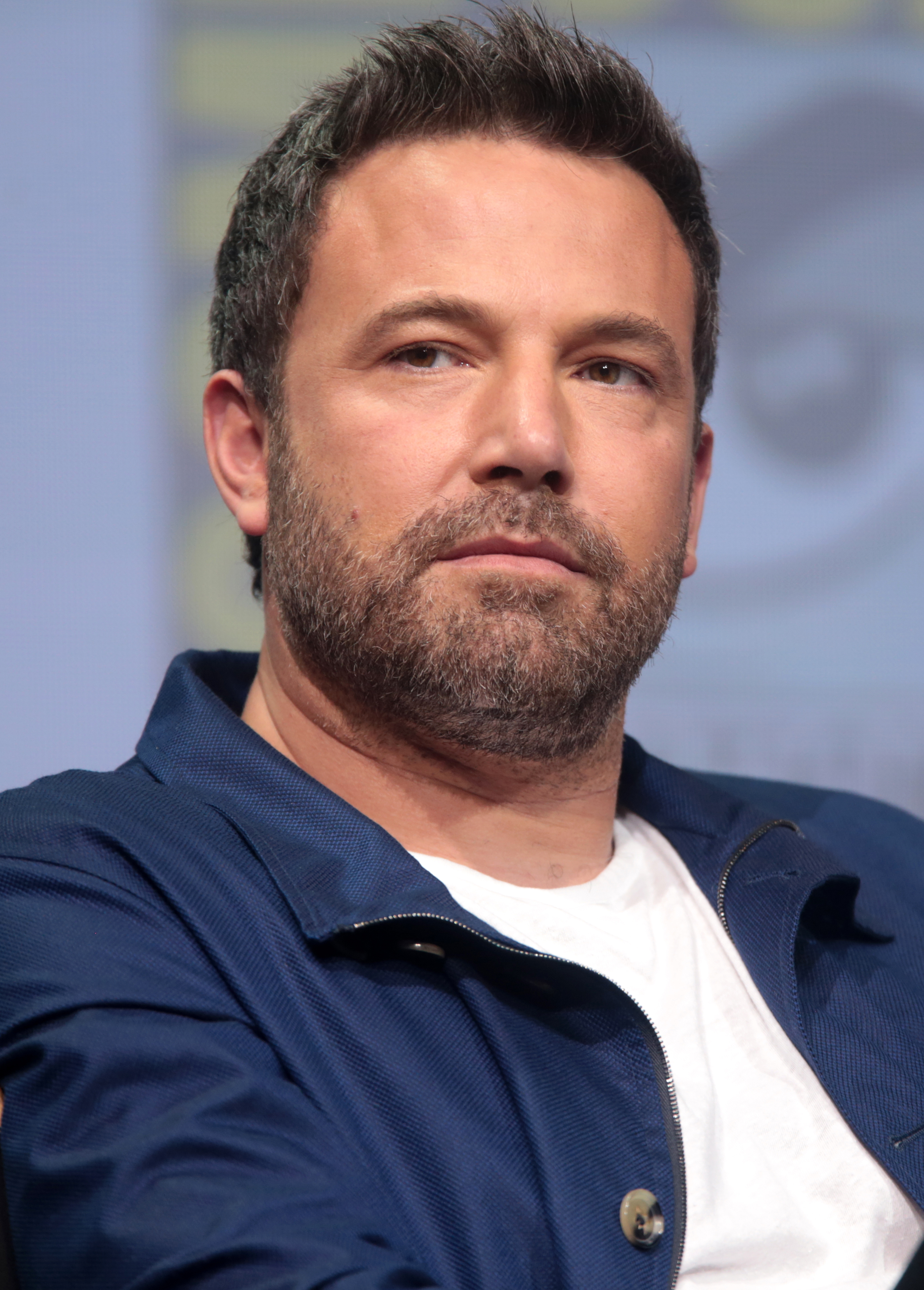
Ben Affleck won for Argo (2012)

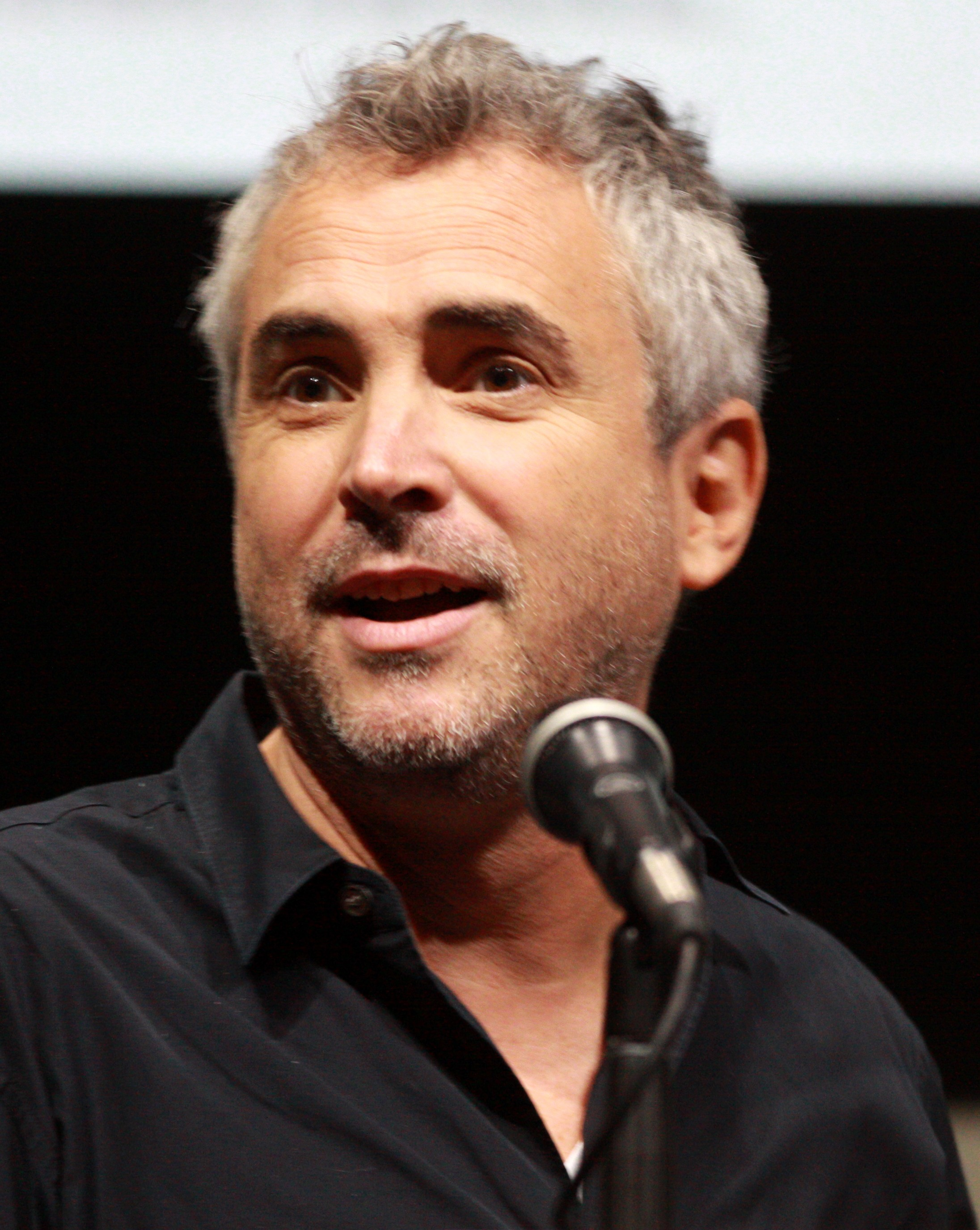
Alfonso Cuarón won twice for Gravity (2013) and Roma (2018)

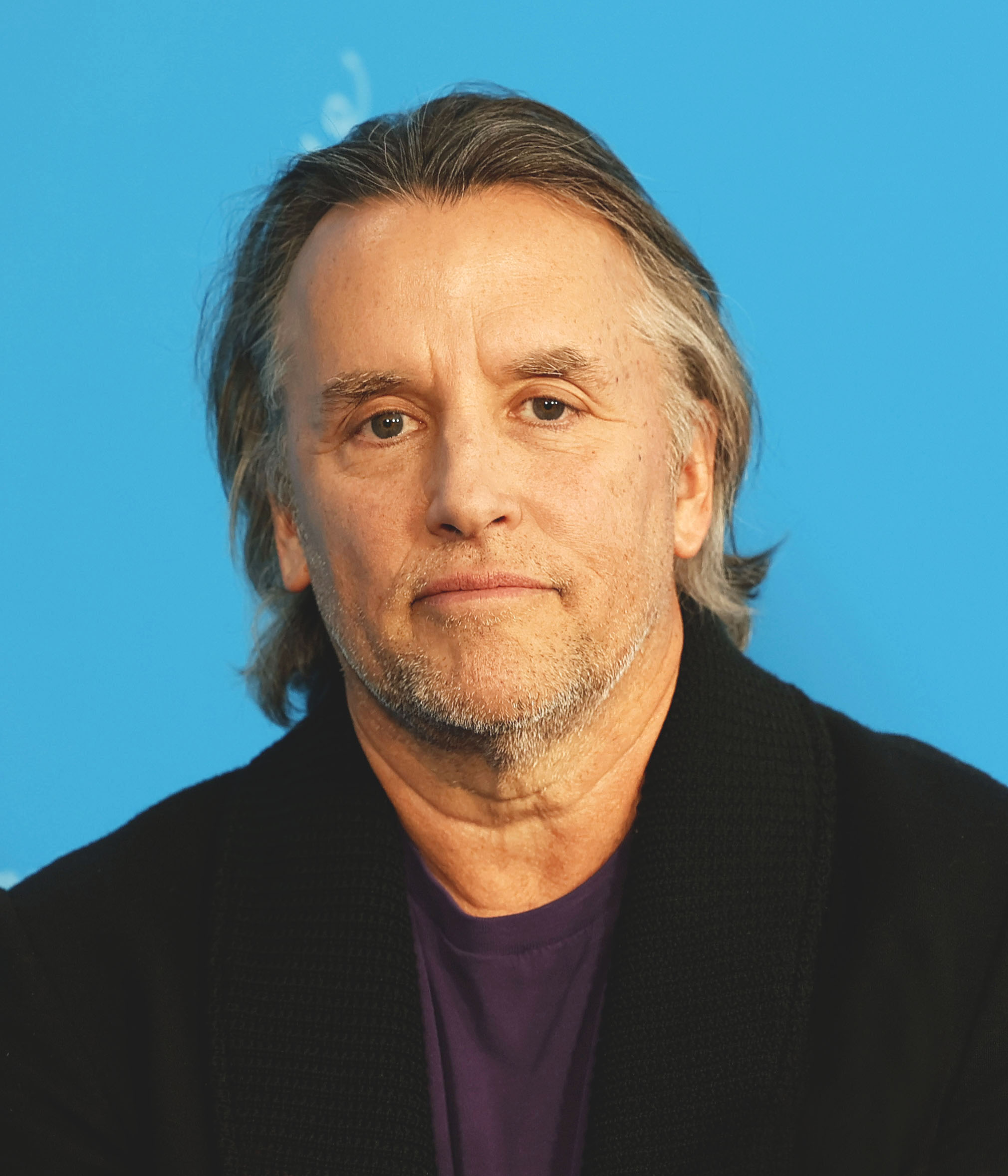
Richard Linklater won for Boyhood (2014)

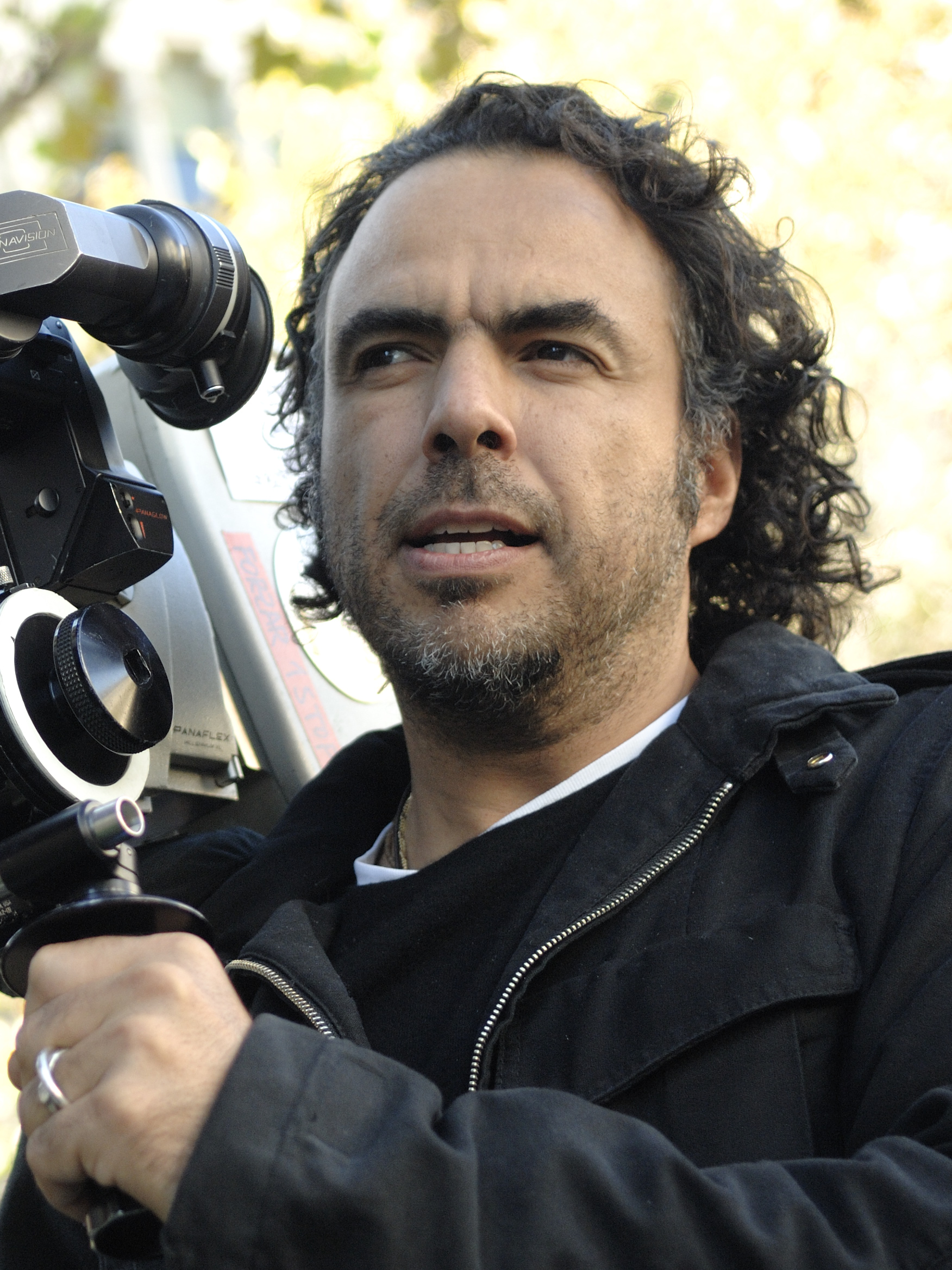
Alejandro González Iñárritu won for The Revenant (2015)

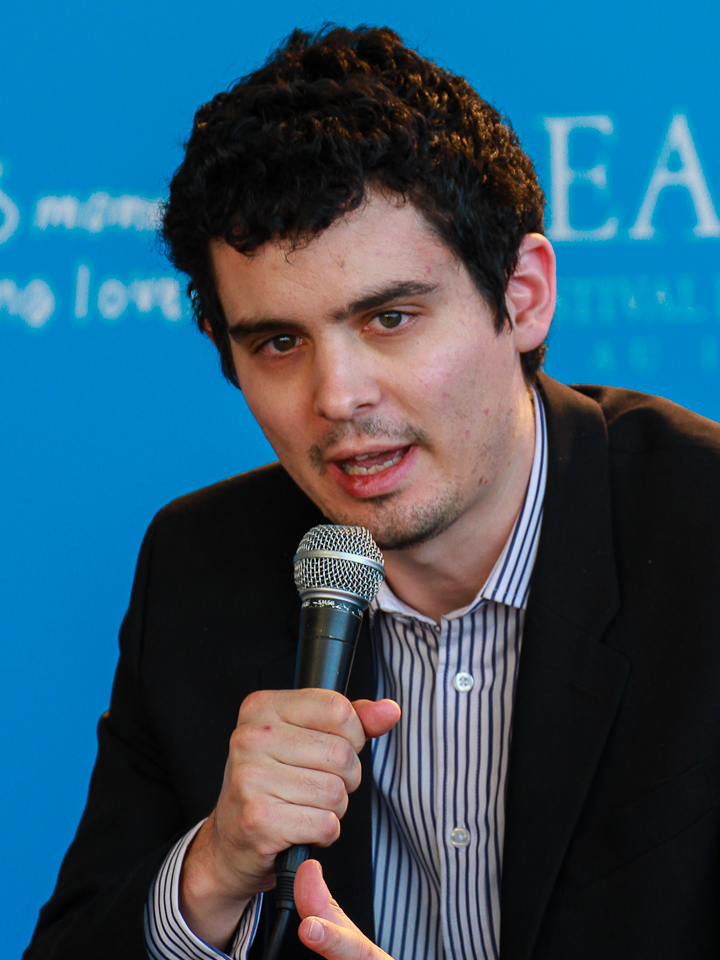
Damien Chazelle won for La La Land (2016)

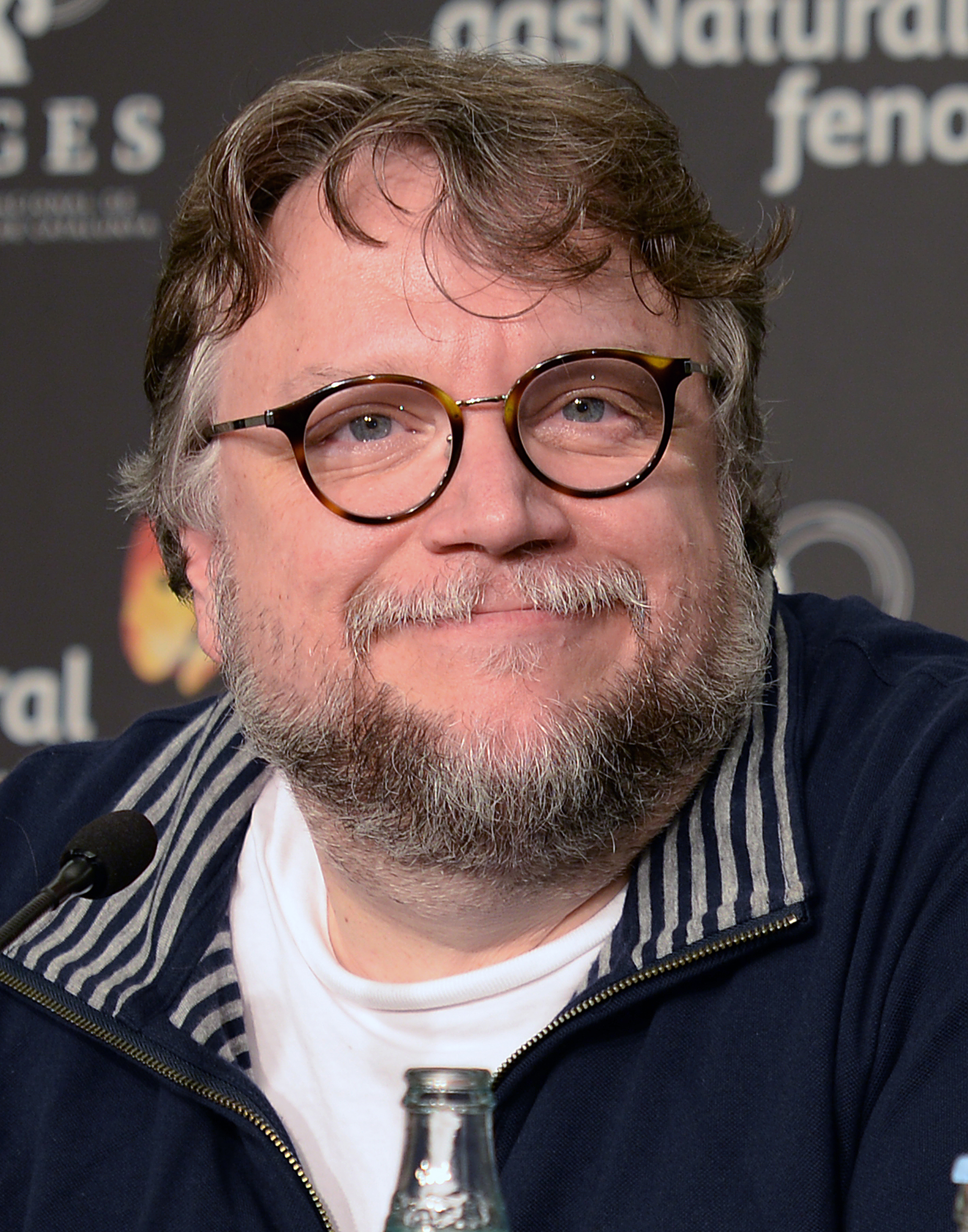
Guillermo del Toro won for The Shape of Water (2017)

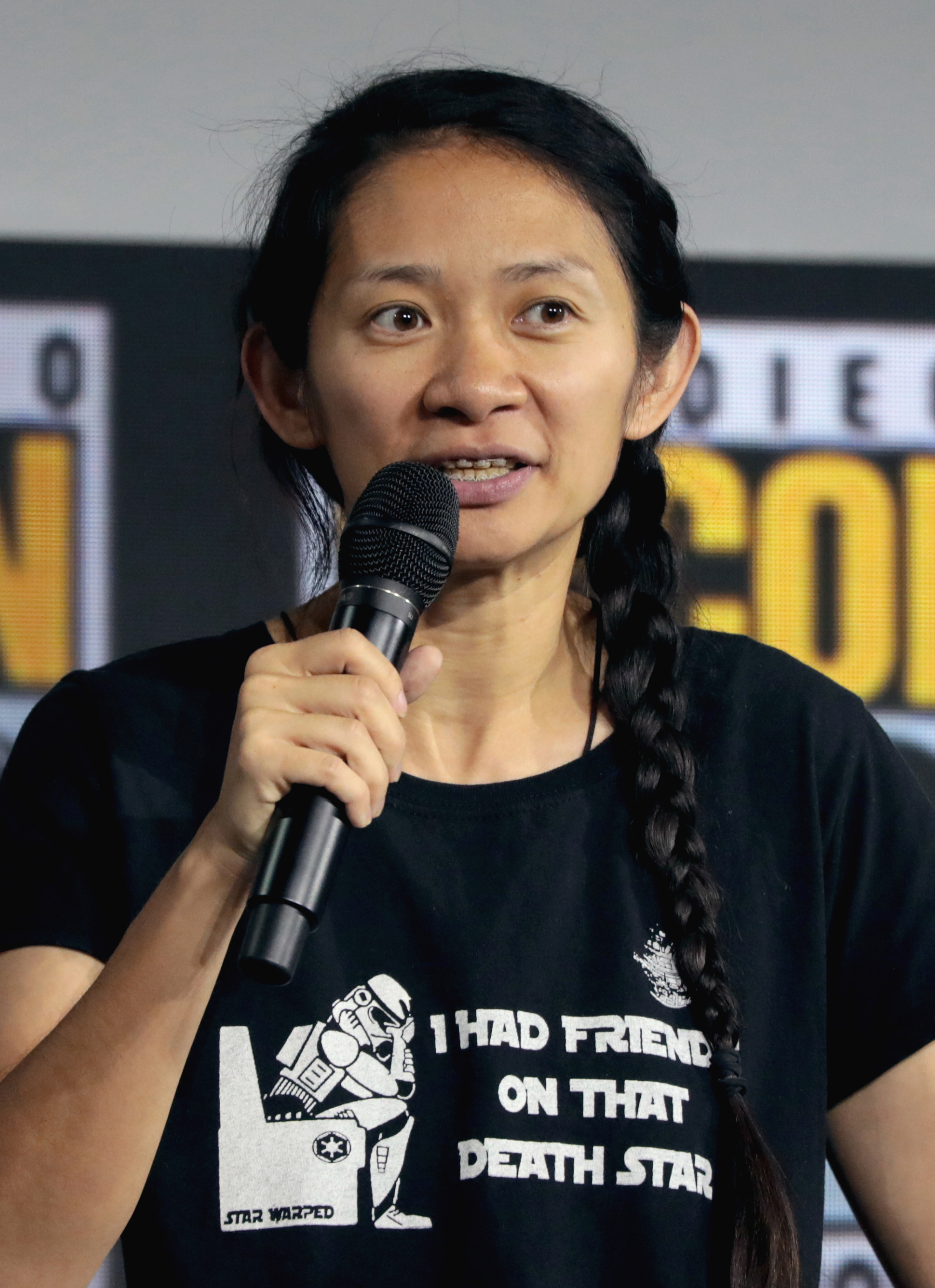
Chloé Zhao won for Nomadland (2020)

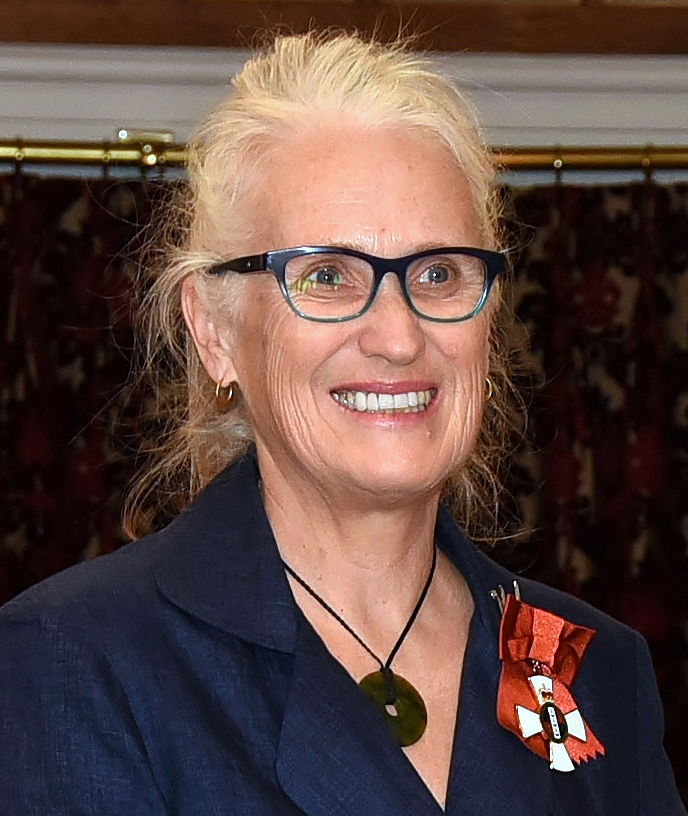
Jane Campion won for The Power of the Dog (2021)

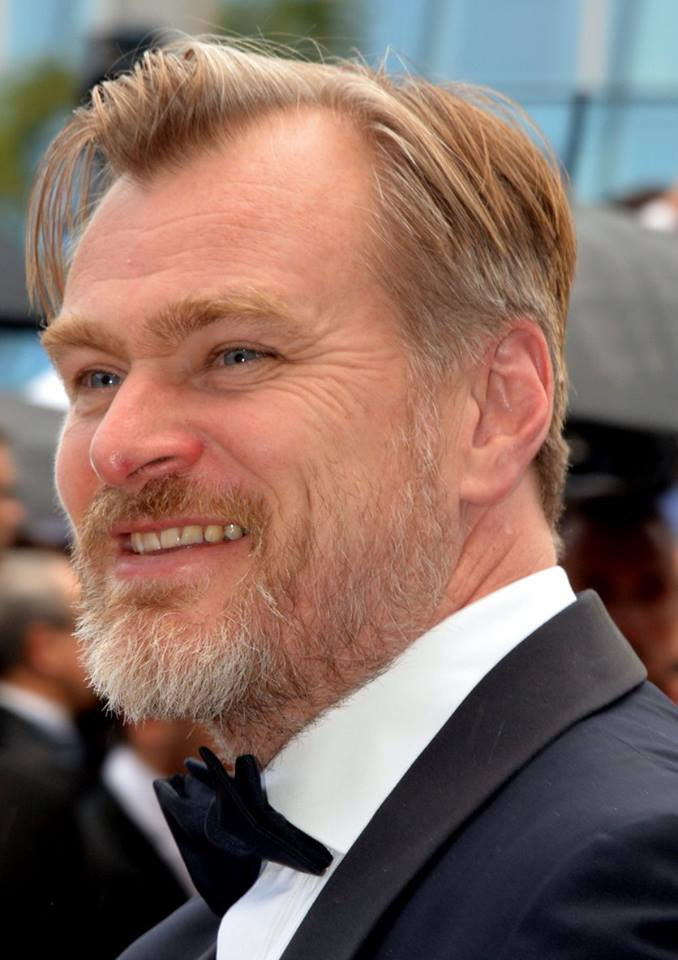
Christopher Nolan won for Oppenheimer (2023)

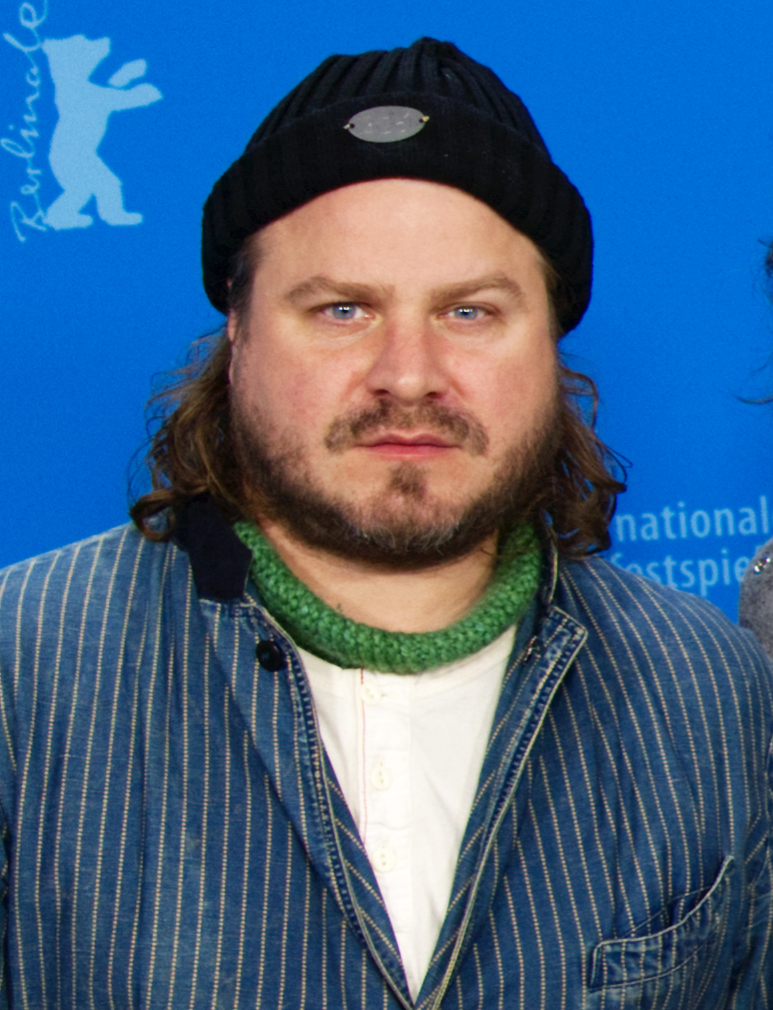
Brady Corbet won for The Brutalist (2024)

=== 1940s ===
Year	Name	Film	Ref.
1943	Henry King	The Song of Bernadette	
1944	Leo McCarey	Going My Way	
1945	Billy Wilder	The Lost Weekend	
1946	Frank Capra	It's a Wonderful Life	
1947	Elia Kazan	Gentleman's Agreement	
1948	John Huston	The Treasure of the Sierra Madre	
1949	Robert Rossen	All the King's Men	

=== 1950s ===
Year	Name	Film	Ref.
1950	**Billy Wilder**	**Sunset Boulevard**	
1950	Joseph L. Mankiewicz	All About Eve	
1950	John Huston	The Asphalt Jungle	
1950	George Cukor	Born Yesterday	
1951	**László Benedek**	**Death of a Salesman**	
1951	Vincente Minnelli	An American in Paris	
1951	George Stevens	A Place in the Sun	
1952	**Cecil B. DeMille**	**The Greatest Show on Earth**	
1952	Richard Fleischer	The Happy Time	
1952	John Ford	The Quiet Man	
1953	**Fred Zinnemann**	**From Here to Eternity**	
1954	**Elia Kazan**	**On the Waterfront**	
1955	**Joshua Logan**	**Picnic**	
1956	**Elia Kazan**	**Baby Doll**	
1956	Michael Anderson	Around the World in 80 Days	
1956	George Stevens	Giant	
1956	Vincente Minnelli	Lust for Life	
1956	King Vidor	War and Peace	
1957	**David Lean**	**The Bridge on the River Kwai**	
1957	Sidney Lumet	12 Angry Men	
1957	Fred Zinnemann	A Hatful of Rain	
1957	Joshua Logan	Sayonara	
1957	Billy Wilder	Witness for the Prosecution	
1958	**Vincente Minnelli**	**Gigi**	
1958	Richard Brooks	Cat on a Hot Tin Roof	
1958	Stanley Kramer	The Defiant Ones	
1958	Robert Wise	I Want to Live!	
1958	Delbert Mann	Separate Tables	
1959	**William Wyler**	**Ben-Hur**	
1959	Otto Preminger	Anatomy of a Murder	
1959	George Stevens	The Diary of Anne Frank	
1959	Fred Zinnemann	The Nun's Story	
1959	Stanley Kramer	On the Beach	

=== 1960s ===
Year	Name	Film	Ref.
1960	**Jack Cardiff**	**Sons and Lovers**	
1960	Billy Wilder	The Apartment	
1960	Richard Brooks	Elmer Gantry	
1960	Stanley Kubrick	Spartacus	
1960	Fred Zinnemann	The Sundowners	
1961	**Stanley Kramer**	**Judgment at Nuremberg**	
1961	William Wyler	The Children's Hour	
1961	Anthony Mann	El Cid	
1961	J. Lee Thompson	The Guns of Navarone	
1961	Jerome Robbins and Robert Wise	West Side Story	
1962	**David Lean**	**Lawrence of Arabia**	
1962	George Cukor	The Chapman Report	
1962	Blake Edwards	Days of Wine and Roses	
1962	John Huston	Freud: The Secret Passion	
1962	Mervyn LeRoy	Gypsy	
1962	Martin Ritt	Hemingway's Adventures of a Young Man	
1962	Stanley Kubrick	Lolita	
1962	John Frankenheimer	The Manchurian Candidate	
1962	Morton DaCosta	The Music Man	
1962	Ismael Rodríguez	My Son, the Hero (Los Hermanos Del Hierro)	
1962	Robert Mulligan	To Kill a Mockingbird	
1963	**Elia Kazan**	**America America**	
1963	Otto Preminger	The Cardinal	
1963	Hall Bartlett	The Caretakers	
1963	Joseph L. Mankiewicz	Cleopatra	
1963	Robert Wise	The Haunting	
1963	Martin Ritt	Hud	
1963	Tony Richardson	Tom Jones	
1963	George Englund	The Ugly American	
1964	**George Cukor**	**My Fair Lady**	
1964	Peter Glenville	Becket	
1964	John Huston	The Night of the Iguana	
1964	John Frankenheimer	Seven Days in May	
1964	Michael Cacoyannis	Zorba the Greek	
1965	**David Lean**	**Doctor Zhivago**	
1965	William Wyler	The Collector	
1965	John Schlesinger	Darling	
1965	Guy Green	A Patch of Blue	
1965	Robert Wise	The Sound of Music	
1966	**Fred Zinnemann**	**A Man for All Seasons**	
1966	Lewis Gilbert	Alfie	
1966	Claude Lelouch	A Man and a Woman	
1966	Robert Wise	The Sand Pebbles	
1966	Mike Nichols	Who's Afraid of Virginia Woolf?	
1967	**Mike Nichols**	**The Graduate**	
1967	Arthur Penn	Bonnie and Clyde	
1967	Mark Rydell	The Fox	
1967	Stanley Kramer	Guess Who's Coming to Dinner	
1967	Norman Jewison	In the Heat of the Night	
1968	**Paul Newman**	**Rachel, Rachel**	
1968	William Wyler	Funny Girl	
1968	Anthony Harvey	The Lion in Winter	
1968	Carol Reed	Oliver!	
1968	Franco Zeffirelli	Romeo and Juliet	
1969	**Charles Jarrott**	**Anne of the Thousand Days**	
1969	Gene Kelly	Hello, Dolly!	
1969	John Schlesinger	Midnight Cowboy	
1969	Stanley Kramer	The Secret of Santa Vittoria	
1969	Sydney Pollack	They Shoot Horses, Don't They?	

=== 1970s ===
Year	Name	Film	Ref.
1970	**Arthur Hiller**	**Love Story**	
1970	Bob Rafelson	Five Easy Pieces	
1970	Robert Altman	M*A*S*H	
1970	Franklin J. Schaffner	Patton	
1970	Ken Russell	Women in Love	
1971	**William Friedkin**	**The French Connection**	
1971	Stanley Kubrick	A Clockwork Orange	
1971	Norman Jewison	Fiddler on the Roof	
1971	Peter Bogdanovich	The Last Picture Show	
1971	Robert Mulligan	Summer of '42	
1972	**Francis Ford Coppola**	**The Godfather**	
1972	Billy Wilder	Avanti!	
1972	Bob Fosse	Cabaret	
1972	John Boorman	Deliverance	
1972	Alfred Hitchcock	Frenzy	
1973	**William Friedkin**	**The Exorcist**	
1973	George Lucas	American Graffiti	
1973	Fred Zinnemann	The Day of the Jackal	
1973	Bernardo Bertolucci	Last Tango in Paris	
1973	Peter Bogdanovich	Paper Moon	
1974	**Roman Polanski**	**Chinatown**	
1974	Francis Ford Coppola	The Conversation	
1974	Francis Ford Coppola	The Godfather Part II	
1974	Bob Fosse	Lenny	
1974	John Cassavetes	A Woman Under the Influence	
1975	**Miloš Forman**	**One Flew Over the Cuckoo's Nest**	
1975	Stanley Kubrick	Barry Lyndon	
1975	Sidney Lumet	Dog Day Afternoon	
1975	Steven Spielberg	Jaws	
1975	Robert Altman	Nashville	
1976	**Sidney Lumet**	**Network**	
1976	Alan J. Pakula	All the President's Men	
1976	Hal Ashby	Bound for Glory	
1976	John Schlesinger	Marathon Man	
1976	John G. Avildsen	Rocky	
1977	**Herbert Ross**	**The Turning Point**	
1977	Woody Allen	Annie Hall	
1977	Steven Spielberg	Close Encounters of the Third Kind	
1977	Fred Zinnemann	Julia	
1977	George Lucas	Star Wars	
1978	**Michael Cimino**	**The Deer Hunter**	
1978	Hal Ashby	Coming Home	
1978	Terrence Malick	Days of Heaven	
1978	Woody Allen	Interiors	
1978	Alan Parker	Midnight Express	
1978	Paul Mazursky	An Unmarried Woman	
1979	**Francis Ford Coppola**	**Apocalypse Now**	
1979	Hal Ashby	Being There	
1979	Peter Yates	Breaking Away	
1979	James Bridges	The China Syndrome	
1979	Robert Benton	Kramer vs. Kramer	

=== 1980s ===
Year	Name	Film	Ref.
1980	**Robert Redford**	**Ordinary People**	
1980	David Lynch	The Elephant Man	
1980	Martin Scorsese	Raging Bull	
1980	Richard Rush	The Stunt Man	
1980	Roman Polanski	Tess	
1981	**Warren Beatty**	**Reds**	
1981	Louis Malle	Atlantic City	
1981	Mark Rydell	On Golden Pond	
1981	Sidney Lumet	Prince of the City	
1981	Miloš Forman	Ragtime	
1981	Steven Spielberg	Raiders of the Lost Ark	
1982	**Richard Attenborough**	**Gandhi**	
1982	Steven Spielberg	E.T. the Extra-Terrestrial	
1982	Constantin Costa-Gavras	Missing	
1982	Sydney Pollack	Tootsie	
1982	Sidney Lumet	The Verdict	
1983	**Barbra Streisand**	**Yentl**	
1983	Peter Yates	The Dresser	
1983	Ingmar Bergman	Fanny and Alexander	
1983	Mike Nichols	Silkwood	
1983	Bruce Beresford	Tender Mercies	
1983	James L. Brooks	Terms of Endearment	
1984	**Miloš Forman**	**Amadeus**	
1984	Francis Ford Coppola	The Cotton Club	
1984	Roland Joffé	The Killing Fields	
1984	Sergio Leone	Once Upon a Time in America	
1984	David Lean	A Passage to India	
1985	**John Huston**	**Prizzi's Honor**	
1985	Richard Attenborough	A Chorus Line	
1985	Steven Spielberg	The Color Purple	
1985	Sydney Pollack	Out of Africa	
1985	Peter Weir	Witness	
1986	**Oliver Stone**	**Platoon**	
1986	Woody Allen	Hannah and Her Sisters	
1986	Roland Joffé	The Mission	
1986	James Ivory	A Room with a View	
1986	Rob Reiner	Stand by Me	
1987	**Bernardo Bertolucci**	**The Last Emperor**	
1987	James L. Brooks	Broadcast News	
1987	Richard Attenborough	Cry Freedom	
1987	Adrian Lyne	Fatal Attraction	
1987	John Boorman	Hope and Glory	
1988	**Clint Eastwood**	**Bird**	
1988	Fred Schepisi	A Cry in the Dark	
1988	Alan Parker	Mississippi Burning	
1988	Barry Levinson	Rain Man	
1988	Sidney Lumet	Running on Empty	
1988	Mike Nichols	Working Girl	
1989	**Oliver Stone**	**Born on the Fourth of July**	
1989	Peter Weir	Dead Poets Society	
1989	Spike Lee	Do the Right Thing	
1989	Edward Zwick	Glory	
1989	Rob Reiner	When Harry Met Sally...	

=== 1990s ===
Year	Name	Film	Ref.
1990	**Kevin Costner**	**Dances with Wolves**	
1990	Francis Ford Coppola	The Godfather Part III	
1990	Martin Scorsese	Goodfellas	
1990	Barbet Schroeder	Reversal of Fortune	
1990	Bernardo Bertolucci	The Sheltering Sky	
1991	**Oliver Stone**	**JFK**	
1991	Barry Levinson	Bugsy	
1991	Terry Gilliam	The Fisher King	
1991	Barbra Streisand	The Prince of Tides	
1991	Jonathan Demme	The Silence of the Lambs	
1992	**Clint Eastwood**	**Unforgiven**	
1992	Rob Reiner	A Few Good Men	
1992	James Ivory	Howards End	
1992	Robert Altman	The Player	
1992	Robert Redford	A River Runs Through It	
1993	**Steven Spielberg**	**Schindler's List**	
1993	Martin Scorsese	The Age of Innocence	
1993	Andrew Davis	The Fugitive	
1993	Jane Campion	The Piano	
1993	James Ivory	The Remains of the Day	
1994	**Robert Zemeckis**	**Forrest Gump**	
1994	Edward Zwick	Legends of the Fall	
1994	Oliver Stone	Natural Born Killers	
1994	Quentin Tarantino	Pulp Fiction	
1994	Robert Redford	Quiz Show	
1995	**Mel Gibson**	**Braveheart**	
1995	Rob Reiner	The American President	
1995	Ron Howard	Apollo 13	
1995	Martin Scorsese	Casino	
1995	Mike Figgis	Leaving Las Vegas	
1995	Ang Lee	Sense and Sensibility	
1996	**Miloš Forman**	**The People vs. Larry Flynt**	
1996	Anthony Minghella	The English Patient	
1996	Alan Parker	Evita	
1996	Joel Coen	Fargo	
1996	Scott Hicks	Shine	
1997	**James Cameron**	**Titanic**	
1997	Steven Spielberg	Amistad	
1997	James L. Brooks	As Good as It Gets	
1997	Jim Sheridan	The Boxer	
1997	Curtis Hanson	L.A. Confidential	
1998	**Steven Spielberg**	**Saving Private Ryan**	
1998	Shekhar Kapur	Elizabeth	
1998	Robert Redford	The Horse Whisperer	
1998	John Madden	Shakespeare in Love	
1998	Peter Weir	The Truman Show	
1999	**Sam Mendes**	**American Beauty**	
1999	Neil Jordan	The End of the Affair	
1999	Norman Jewison	The Hurricane	
1999	Michael Mann	The Insider	
1999	Anthony Minghella	The Talented Mr. Ripley	

=== 2000s ===
Year	Name	Film	Ref.
2000	**Ang Lee**	**Crouching Tiger, Hidden Dragon**	
2000	Steven Soderbergh	Erin Brockovich	
2000	Ridley Scott	Gladiator	
2000	István Szabó	Sunshine	
2000	Steven Soderbergh	Traffic	
2001	**Robert Altman**	**Gosford Park**	
2001	Steven Spielberg	A.I. Artificial Intelligence	
2001	Ron Howard	A Beautiful Mind	
2001	Peter Jackson	The Lord of the Rings: The Fellowship of the Ring	
2001	Baz Luhrmann	Moulin Rouge!	
2001	David Lynch	Mulholland Drive	
2002	**Martin Scorsese**	**Gangs of New York**	
2002	Alexander Payne	About Schmidt	
2002	Spike Jonze	Adaptation.	
2002	Rob Marshall	Chicago	
2002	Stephen Daldry	The Hours	
2002	Peter Jackson	The Lord of the Rings: The Two Towers	
2003	**Peter Jackson**	**The Lord of the Rings: The Return of the King**	
2003	Anthony Minghella	Cold Mountain	
2003	Sofia Coppola	Lost in Translation	
2003	Peter Weir	Master and Commander: The Far Side of the World	
2003	Clint Eastwood	Mystic River	
2004	**Clint Eastwood**	**Million Dollar Baby**	
2004	Martin Scorsese	The Aviator	
2004	Mike Nichols	Closer	
2004	Marc Forster	Finding Neverland	
2004	Alexander Payne	Sideways	
2005	**Ang Lee**	**Brokeback Mountain**	
2005	Fernando Meirelles	The Constant Gardener	
2005	George Clooney	Good Night, and Good Luck.	
2005	Peter Jackson	King Kong	
2005	Woody Allen	Match Point	
2005	Steven Spielberg	Munich	
2006	**Martin Scorsese**	**The Departed**	
2006	Alejandro González Iñárritu	Babel	
2006	Clint Eastwood	Flags of Our Fathers	
2006	Clint Eastwood	Letters from Iwo Jima	
2006	Stephen Frears	The Queen	
2007	**Julian Schnabel**	**The Diving Bell and the Butterfly**	
2007	Ridley Scott	American Gangster	
2007	Joe Wright	Atonement	
2007	Joel Coen and Ethan Coen	No Country for Old Men	
2007	Tim Burton	Sweeney Todd: The Demon Barber of Fleet Street	
2008	**Danny Boyle**	**Slumdog Millionaire**	
2008	David Fincher	The Curious Case of Benjamin Button	
2008	Ron Howard	Frost/Nixon	
2008	Stephen Daldry	The Reader	
2008	Sam Mendes	Revolutionary Road	
2009	**James Cameron**	**Avatar**	
2009	Kathryn Bigelow	The Hurt Locker	
2009	Quentin Tarantino	Inglourious Basterds	
2009	Clint Eastwood	Invictus	
2009	Jason Reitman	Up in the Air	

=== 2010s ===
Year	Name	Film	Ref.
2010	**David Fincher**	**The Social Network**	
2010	Darren Aronofsky	Black Swan	
2010	David O. Russell	The Fighter	
2010	Christopher Nolan	Inception	
2010	Tom Hooper	The King's Speech	
2011	**Martin Scorsese**	**Hugo**	
2011	Michel Hazanavicius	The Artist	
2011	Alexander Payne	The Descendants	
2011	George Clooney	The Ides of March	
2011	Woody Allen	Midnight in Paris	
2012	**Ben Affleck**	**Argo**	
2012	Quentin Tarantino	Django Unchained	
2012	Ang Lee	Life of Pi	
2012	Steven Spielberg	Lincoln	
2012	Kathryn Bigelow	Zero Dark Thirty	
2013	**Alfonso Cuarón**	**Gravity**	
2013	Steve McQueen	12 Years a Slave	
2013	David O. Russell	American Hustle	
2013	Paul Greengrass	Captain Phillips	
2013	Alexander Payne	Nebraska	
2014	**Richard Linklater**	**Boyhood**	
2014	Alejandro González Iñárritu	Birdman or (The Unexpected Virtue of Ignorance)	
2014	David Fincher	Gone Girl	
2014	Wes Anderson	The Grand Budapest Hotel	
2014	Ava DuVernay	Selma	
2015	**Alejandro González Iñárritu**	**The Revenant**	
2015	Todd Haynes	Carol	
2015	George Miller	Mad Max: Fury Road	
2015	Ridley Scott	The Martian	
2015	Tom McCarthy	Spotlight	
2016	**Damien Chazelle**	**La La Land**	
2016	Mel Gibson	Hacksaw Ridge	
2016	Barry Jenkins	Moonlight	
2016	Kenneth Lonergan	Manchester by the Sea	
2016	Tom Ford	Nocturnal Animals	
2017	**Guillermo del Toro**	**The Shape of Water**	
2017	Ridley Scott	All the Money in the World	
2017	Christopher Nolan	Dunkirk	
2017	Steven Spielberg	The Post	
2017	Martin McDonagh	Three Billboards Outside Ebbing, Missouri	
2018	**Alfonso Cuarón**	**Roma**	
2018	Spike Lee	BlacKkKlansman	
2018	Peter Farrelly	Green Book	
2018	Bradley Cooper	A Star Is Born	
2018	Adam McKay	Vice	
2019	**Sam Mendes**	**1917**	
2019	Martin Scorsese	The Irishman	
2019	Todd Phillips	Joker	
2019	Quentin Tarantino	Once Upon a Time in Hollywood	
2019	Bong Joon-ho	Parasite	

=== 2020s ===
Year	Name	Film	Ref.
2020	**Chloé Zhao**	**Nomadland**	
2020	David Fincher	Mank	
2020	Regina King	One Night in Miami...	
2020	Emerald Fennell	Promising Young Woman	
2020	Aaron Sorkin	The Trial of the Chicago 7	
2021	**Jane Campion**	**The Power of the Dog**	
2021	Kenneth Branagh	Belfast	
2021	Denis Villeneuve	Dune	
2021	Maggie Gyllenhaal	The Lost Daughter	
2021	Steven Spielberg	West Side Story	
2022	**Steven Spielberg**	**The Fabelmans**	
2022	James Cameron	Avatar: The Way of Water	
2022	Martin McDonagh	The Banshees of Inisherin	
2022	Baz Luhrmann	Elvis	
2022	Daniel Kwan and Daniel Scheinert	Everything Everywhere All at Once	
2023	**Christopher Nolan**	**Oppenheimer**	
2023	Greta Gerwig	Barbie	
2023	Martin Scorsese	Killers of the Flower Moon	
2023	Bradley Cooper	Maestro	
2023	Celine Song	Past Lives	
2023	Yorgos Lanthimos	Poor Things	
2024	**Brady Corbet**	**The Brutalist**	
2024	Payal Kapadia	All We Imagine as Light	
2024	Sean Baker	Anora	
2024	Edward Berger	Conclave	
2024	Jacques Audiard	Emilia Pérez	
2024	Coralie Fargeat	The Substance	
2025	**Paul Thomas Anderson**	**One Battle After Another**	
2025	Chloé Zhao	Hamnet	
2025	Jafar Panahi	It Was Just an Accident	
2025	Guillermo del Toro	Frankenstein	
2025	Joachim Trier	Sentimental Value	
2025	Ryan Coogler	Sinners	

== Multiple nominations ==
=== More than 5 nominations ===
- Steven Spielberg (14/3)
- Martin Scorsese (10/3)
- Clint Eastwood (7/3)
- Fred Zinnemann (7/2)
- Francis Ford Coppola (6/2)
- Sidney Lumet (6/1)

=== 5 nominations ===
- Woody Allen (5/0)
- John Huston (5/2)
- Stanley Kramer (5/1)
- Mike Nichols (5/1)
- Billy Wilder (5/2)
- Robert Wise (5/0)

=== 4 nominations ===
- Robert Altman (4/1)
- David Fincher (4/1)
- Miloš Forman (4/3)
- Peter Jackson (4/1)
- Elia Kazan (4/4)
- Stanley Kubrick (4/0)
- David Lean (4/3)
- Ang Lee (4/2)
- Alexander Payne (4/0)
- Robert Redford (4/1)
- Rob Reiner (4/0)
- Ridley Scott (4/0)
- Oliver Stone (4/3)
- Quentin Tarantino (4/0)
- Peter Weir (4/0)
- William Wyler (4/1)

=== 3 nominations ===
- Hal Ashby (3/0)
- Richard Attenborough (3/1)
- Bernardo Bertolucci (3/1)
- James L. Brooks (3/0)
- James Cameron (3/2)
- George Cukor (3/1)
- Ron Howard (3/0)
- Alejandro González Iñárritu (3/1)
- James Ivory (3/0)
- Norman Jewison (3/0)
- Sam Mendes (3/2)
- Anthony Minghella (3/0)
- Vincente Minnelli (3/1)
- Christopher Nolan (3/1)
- Alan Parker (3/0)
- Sydney Pollack (3/0)
- John Schlesinger (3/0)
- George Stevens (3/0)

=== 2 nominations ===
- Kathryn Bigelow (2/0)
- Peter Bogdanovich (2/0)
- John Boorman (2/0)
- Richard Brooks (2/0)
- Jane Campion (2/1)
- George Clooney (2/0)
- Bradley Cooper (2/0)
- Joel Coen (2/0)
- Alfonso Cuarón (2/2)
- Stephen Daldry (2/0)
- Guillermo del Toro (2/1)
- Bob Fosse (2/0)
- William Friedkin (2/2)
- John Frankenheimer (2/0)
- Mel Gibson (2/1)
- Roland Joffé (2/0)
- Spike Lee (2/0)
- Barry Levinson (2/0)
- Joshua Logan (2/1)
- George Lucas (2/0)
- Baz Luhrmann (2/0)
- David Lynch (2/0)
- Joseph L. Mankiewicz (2/0)
- Martin McDonagh (2/0)
- Robert Mulligan (2/0)
- Roman Polanski (2/1)
- Otto Preminger (2/0)
- Martin Ritt (2/0)
- David O. Russell (2/0)
- Mark Rydell (2/0)
- Steven Soderbergh (2/0)
- Barbra Streisand (2/1)
- Peter Yates (2/0)
- Chloé Zhao (2/1)
- Edward Zwick (2/0)

== Multiple winners ==
4 awards

- Elia Kazan

3 awards

- Clint Eastwood
- Miloš Forman
- David Lean
- Martin Scorsese
- Steven Spielberg
- Oliver Stone

2 awards

- James Cameron
- Francis Ford Coppola
- Alfonso Cuarón
- William Friedkin
- John Huston
- Ang Lee
- Sam Mendes
- Billy Wilder
- Fred Zinnemann

== See also ==
- BAFTA Award for Best Direction
- Academy Award for Best Director
- Critics' Choice Movie Award for Best Director
- Directors Guild of America Award for Outstanding Directing – Feature Film
- Independent Spirit Award for Best Director
