= A Little Like Drowning =

- Directed by: Anthony Minghella
- Written by: Anthony Minghella
- Produced by: Michael Maloney
- Starring: Ann Gow; David Hatton; Anthony Minghella; Dominic Minghella
- Cinematography: Michael Maloney
- Release date: 1978
- Running time: 55 minutes
- Country: United Kingdom
- Language: English

A Little Like Drowning is a 1978 film written and directed by Anthony Minghella. The first film he directed, this 55-minute feature was shot on the Isle of Wight in 1977 and completed in 15 days.

== Credits ==
- Director: Anthony Minghella
- Production Company: The Silver Screen Film Company
- Producer: Michael Maloney
- Associate Producer: Pamela Burns
- Screenplay: Anthony Minghella
- Cinematographer: Michael Maloney
- Art Director: Lee Elliott
- Film editor: Barry Reynolds

== Cast ==
- Ann Gow as Leonora
- David Hatton as Alfredo
- Rosy Clayton as Theresa
- Carole Reed as Amelia
- Anita Belli as Gioia
- David Pugh as Victorio
- Anthony Minghella as Eduardo
- Antonietta Bell as Commara Theresa
- Penny Cartwright as child Leonora
- Dominic Minghella as Martino
- Mary Baker as Mabel
- Harry Chivers as Man in cafe
- George Croudass as Robert
- Lee Elliott as Bridegroom
- Denis Frank as Sandwichman
- David Guthrie as Father David
- Fiona Kelly as Waitress
- Sheila McAnulty as Woman in cafe
- Gareth Pritchard as Father Benedict
- Brian Small as Washer-up
- Elizabeth Verrecchia as Accordionist
- Heather Williams as Julia Jarrett
