= Made in Bangkok =

Made in Bangkok is a stage play written by Anthony Minghella. It was first performed on 18 March 1986 at the Aldwych Theatre, London with a cast including Felicity Kendal.

The play is set in Bangkok, Thailand in the 1980 and explicitly explores sex tourism and its ramifications. The play won London Theatre Critics Award for best new play in 1986,

Cast:

- Felicity Kendal as Frances
- Peter McEnery as Edward
- Benjamin Whitrow as Adrian
- Paul Shelley as Stephen
- David Yip as Net
