= Anthony Minghella =

British filmmaker and playwright (1954–2008)

Anthony Minghella CBE
- Minghella in 2004
- Born: 6 January 1954; Ryde, Isle of Wight, England
- Died: 18 March 2008 (aged 54); London, England
- Education: University of Hull
- Occupations: Film director; screenwriter; film producer; playwright
- Years active: 1975–2008
- Spouses: Yvonne Millar (divorced) Carolyn Choa (m. 1985)
- Children: 2, including Max
- Relatives: Dominic Minghella (brother); Loretta Minghella (sister)

Anthony Minghella (6 January 1954 – 18 March 2008) was an English filmmaker and playwright. He was chairman of the board of Governors at the British Film Institute between 2003 and 2007. He directed the films Truly, Madly, Deeply (1990), The English Patient (1996), The Talented Mr. Ripley (1999), and Cold Mountain (2003), and produced other films like Michael Clayton (2007) and The Reader (2008).

Minghella received the Academy Award for Best Director for The English Patient. In addition, he received three more Oscar nominations; he was nominated for Best Adapted Screenplay for both The English Patient and The Talented Mr. Ripley, and was posthumously nominated for Best Picture for The Reader.

== Early life and education ==
Minghella was born to Italian British parents in Ryde on the Isle of Wight. His family are well known on the island, where they ran a café in Ryde until the 1980s and have run an eponymous business making and selling Italian-style ice cream since the 1950s. His parents were Edoardo Minghella (an Italian immigrant) and Leeds-born Gloria Alberta (née Arcari). His mother's ancestors originally came from Valvori, a small village in southern Lazio, Italy. He was one of five children, his sisters Gioia Minghella-Giddens, Edana Minghella and Loretta Minghella, and a brother Dominic Minghella who also became a screenwriter and producer.

Minghella attended St. Mary's Catholic Primary School, Ryde, Sandown Grammar School, and St John's College, Portsmouth. Early interests suggested a possible career as a musician, with Minghella playing keyboards with local bands Earthlight and Dancer. The latter recorded an album titled Tales of the Riverbank in 1972, although it was not released until 2001.

He attended the University of Hull, studying drama. As an undergraduate he had arrived at university with an EMI contract for the band, in which he sang and played keyboards; while at university he wrote words and music for an adaptation of Gabriel Josipovici's Mobius the Stripper (1975).

Minghella graduated after three years and stayed on to pursue a PhD. He also taught at the university for several years, on Samuel Beckett and on the medieval theatre. Ultimately, he abandoned his pursuit of a PhD to work for the BBC.

== Career ==
Minghella's debut work was a stage adaptation of Gabriel Josipovici's Mobius the Stripper (1975) and it was his Whale Music (1985) that brought him notice. His double bill of Samuel Beckett's Play and Happy Days was his directorial debut and debut feature film as a director was A Little Like Drowning (1978). During the 1980s, he worked in television, starting as a runner on Magpie before moving into script editing the children's drama series Grange Hill for the BBC and later writing The Storyteller series for Jim Henson. He wrote three episodes of the ITV detective drama Inspector Morse and an episode of long-running ITV drama Boon. Made in Bangkok (1986) found mainstream success in the West End.

Radio success followed with a Giles Cooper Award for the radio drama Cigarettes and Chocolate first broadcast on BBC Radio 4 in 1988. It was revived on 3 May 2008 as a tribute to its author director following his death. His production starred Juliet Stevenson, Bill Nighy and Jenny Howe. His first radio play Hang Up, starring Anton Lesser and Juliet Stevenson, was revived on 10 May 2008 as part of the BBC Radio 4 Minghella season.

Truly, Madly, Deeply (1990), a feature drama written and directed for the BBC's Screen Two anthology strand, bypassed TV broadcast and instead had a cinema release. He turned down an offer to direct another Inspector Morse to do the project, even though he believed that the Morse episode would have been a much higher-profile assignment. The English Patient (1996) brought him two Academy Awards nominations, Best Director (which he won) and Adapted Screenplay. He also received an Adapted Screenplay nomination for The Talented Mr. Ripley (1999).

His adaptation of The No. 1 Ladies' Detective Agency, which he co-wrote and directed, was broadcast posthumously on BBC One (23 March 2008) as a TV movie; watched by 6.3 million viewers. He vocally supported I Know I'm Not Alone, a film of musician Michael Franti's peacemaking excursions into Iraq, Palestine and Israel. He directed a party election broadcast for the Labour Party in 2005. The short film depicted Tony Blair and Gordon Brown working together and was criticised for being insincere: "The Anthony Minghella party political broadcast last year was full of body language fibs", said Peter Collett, a psychologist at the University of Oxford. "When you are talking to me, I'll give you my full attention only if I think you are very high status or if I love you. On that party political broadcast, they are staring at each other like lovers. It is completely false."

With Samuel Beckett's 100th birthday celebrations, he returned to radio on BBC Radio 3 with Eyes Down Looking (2006), with: Jude Law, Juliet Stevenson and David Threlfall. An operatic directorial debut came with Puccini's Madama Butterfly. Premiered at the English National Opera (London, 2005), then at the Lithuanian National Opera and Ballet Theatre (Vilnius, March 2006) and at the Metropolitan Opera (New York City, September 2006). The latter was transmitted live into cinemas worldwide (7 March 2009) as part of the Met's HD series and is now available on DVD. The ENO work was to have led to other operatic projects, directing again at English National Opera and collaborating with Osvaldo Golijov on a new opera for the Met and ENO, writing the libretto and directing the production.

He was honoured with the naming of The Anthony Minghella Theatre at the Quay Arts Centre (Isle of Wight). He made an appearance in the 2007 film Atonement as a television host interviewing the novelist central to the story.

His last work was the screenplay of the film adaptation of the Tony Award-winning musical Nine (1982); Arthur Kopit (book) and Maury Yeston (score). It is based on the film 8½. He shared credit with Michael Tolkin on the screenplay.

The department of Film, Theatre & Television at the University of Reading, opened in 2012, was named in his honour.

== Personal life ==
Minghella met his first wife, Yvonne Millar, when they were students. They had one daughter, Hannah, and later divorced. In 1985 Minghella married Hong Kong–born choreographer and dancer Carolyn Jane Choa. They had one son, Max.

Minghella's younger brother, Dominic Minghella, is the creator of the television series Robin Hood and Doc Martin. His sister, Loretta Minghella, is Master of Clare College, Cambridge.

Minghella was a fan of Portsmouth F.C., and appeared in the Channel 4 documentary, Hallowed Be Thy Game. His home had two double bedrooms dedicated to the display of Portsmouth memorabilia dating back to the club's founding in 1898.

=== Death ===
Minghella died of a haemorrhage on 18 March 2008 in Charing Cross Hospital, Hammersmith, following an operation the previous week to remove cancer of the tonsils and neck. He was 54 years old.

== Memorial plaques ==
A memorial plaque to Minghella was unveiled on 2 March 2016 by Jude Law, at Western Gardens, Ryde, Isle of Wight. He is commemorated with a green plaque on The Avenues, Kingston upon Hull. The 2009 film Nine is dedicated in his memory.

== Filmography ==
=== Short films ===
Year	Title	Director	Writer	Producer	Notes
2000	Play	Yes	No	No	
2008	Love You More	No	No	Yes	

=== Feature films ===
Year	Title	Functioned as			Notes
Year	Title	Director	Writer	Producer	Notes
1978	A Little Like Drowning	Yes	Yes	No	
1990	Truly, Madly, Deeply	Yes	Yes	No	
1993	Mr. Wonderful	Yes	No	No	
1996	The English Patient	Yes	Yes	No	
1999	The Talented Mr. Ripley	Yes	Yes	No	
2003	Cold Mountain	Yes	Yes	No	
2006	Breaking and Entering	Yes	Yes	Yes	
2008	New York, I Love You	No	Yes	Executive	Segment: "Shekhar Kapur"

==== Writer only ====
- Nine (2009)

==== Producer only ====
- Heaven (2002)
- Catch a Fire (2006)
- The Reader (2008)

Executive producer only

Year	Title	Director	Notes
2001	Iris	Richard Eyre	
2002	The Quiet American	Phillip Noyce	
2005	The Interpreter	Sydney Pollack	
2007	Michael Clayton	Tony Gilroy	
2011	Margaret	Kenneth Lonergan	

Acting roles

- A Little Like Drowning (1978) - Eduardo
- Atonement (2007) - Interviewer

=== Television ===
Year	Title	Director	Writer	Executive Producer	Notes
1986	What If It's Raining	No	Yes	No	3 episodes
1987	The Storyteller	No	Yes	No	9 episodes
1990	Inspector Morse	No	Yes	No	3 episodes
2008	The No. 1 Ladies' Detective Agency	Yes	Yes	Yes	Also co-created with Richard Curtis

== Bibliography ==
=== Selected plays ===
- Whale Music (New End Theatre, Hampstead, June 1981); revived for radio, BBC Radio 4, 10 May 2008
- Two Planks and a Passion (Greenwich Theatre, November 1984)
- A Little Like Drowning (Hampstead Theatre, July 1984)
- Made in Bangkok (West End debut as a playwright, Aldwych Theatre. 18 March 1986, director Michael Blakemore)
- Hang Up (radio play for BBC Radio 4,1987)
- Cigarettes and Chocolate (60-minute radio play for BBC Radio 4, 1988)
- Eyes Down Looking (Beckett 100th Birthday tribute, radio play for BBC Radio 3, 1 April 2006)

== Accolades ==
Year	Title	Academy Awards		BAFTA Awards		Golden Globe Awards	
Year	Title	Nominations	Wins	Nominations	Wins	Nominations	Wins
1990	Truly, Madly, Deeply			3	1		
1996	The English Patient	12	9	13	6	7	2
1999	The Talented Mr. Ripley	5		7	1	5	
2003	Cold Mountain	7	1	13	2	8	1
Total		24	10	36	10	20	3

== See also ==
- Theatre Record and its indexes for play production dates and awards
- List of British playwrights since 1950
- List of Academy Award winners and nominees from Great Britain
