= List of Robin Hood (2006 TV series) characters =

Robin Hood is a British television dramedy series, produced by Tiger Aspect Productions for BBC One, which debuted in October 2006. The programme uses the majority of the familiar characters from the traditional Robin Hood legends. Though appearances by Friar Tuck and Prince John are not until series 3 (although the latter was frequently mentioned throughout entire series), portrayed by David Harewood and Toby Stephens respectively. Some characters have been given new back-stories or personality traits not evident in previous versions of the legend. The show has a contemporary edge which extends to its costumes and themes. Often alluding to the current political events of the 21st century. Its characters sometimes use contractions, not yet used in the 12th century; when the show is set.

== Main characters ==
=== Robin Hood ===
Robin of Locksley
- Robin Hood character
- First appearance: "Will You Tolerate This?"
- Last appearance: "Something Worth Fighting For, Part 2"
- Created by: Dominic Minghella; Foz Allan
- Portrayed by: Jonas Armstrong

In-universe information
- Title(s): Robin of Locksley, Earl of Huntingdon, and Hero of Acre
- Occupation: Outlaw after being a lord
- Family: Lord Malcolm of Locksley (father, deceased); Archer (half-brother)
- Spouse: Marian

Sir Robin of Locksley (alias Robin Hood after outlawed), is the titular main protagonist of the 2006 TV series. He is portrayed by Jonas Armstrong, who is much younger than many of the previous actors to have played the character. Armstrong described his portrayal of Robin Hood as "A believable superhero... Like all leaders, he's an egoist and he's often quite arrogant. He's not an out-and-out hero...He has an undercurrent of darkness."

At the beginning of series one, Robin has just returned to England after five years fighting in the Third Crusade as part of the King's Guard, during which he was honoured by King Richard and almost mortally wounded. He was still the Earl of Huntingdon, and Lord of Locksley Manor and its estate. He becomes an outlaw after refusing to preside over the execution of Will Scarlett, his brother and Allan A Dale. In the earlier episodes, it becomes clear that his memories of the Crusades have affected him strongly, making him unwilling to kill, this being why he does not kill the Sheriff or Gisborne early on.

Robin had previously been betrothed to Marian when they were teenagers, but this was undone by his departure. He still has strong feelings for her when he returns and is pleased that she is still unmarried. However, their relationship is strained and she is untrusting of him. Marian initially shuns Robin and rejects his attempts to charm her. They become closer over the course of the first series, Robin frequently visiting her home under cover of darkness, though their meetings usually are concerned with Robin's war against the Sheriff. He is devastated when she becomes engaged to Guy of Gisborne in order to protect herself and her father. Robin is witness to this and is visibly upset. He endeavours to find a way for Marian break her engagement to Guy, by proving he is a traitor to the King.

A darker side of Robin's character is revealed in episode 8 of series 1. when he realises that it was a masked Gisborne he prevented from killing King Richard in the Holy Land. This sends Robin into a rage and he attempts to kill Gisborne, compromising his own teachings and beliefs. Though prevented from doing so, Robin strives to prove his guilt for the rest of the series.

When Guy stabs Marian, unaware that it is her disguised as the Night Watchman, she appears to die. Robin and Marian begin to express their regret over their parting many years ago. Robin admitting that he believes they should be together and that he should not have gone to war, leaving her. To a supposedly dead Marian, Robin now utterly distraught, breaks down over her body and admits that he loves her. She survives; her "death" attributed to the shutting down of her body following the stab wound, and hemlock, applied by the treacherous physician Pitts. Despite her love for Robin, she decides to go ahead with the wedding to Guy, in order to protect her Father. A heart-broken Robin abandons his men.

Robin viciously rebuffs Much's attempts to comfort him and prepares to leave Nottingham. He stops in his tracks when he hears Much interrupting Marian's wedding and reaches the ceremony in time to see Marian leave Guy at the altar. He gives her a ride to the castle after Gisborne reveals his true colours. They share their first kiss outside the castle gates, establishing their romantic relationship. Robin gets his fighting spirit back, saving Marian's father Edward from being killed by the Sheriff and redeeming himself to Much by preventing the Sheriff from slitting his throat.

In series 2, Robin and Marian's relationship has developed, and after Marian's father dies, she joins Robin in the forest. The transition is not easy and takes a toll on Marians independence. They share a common goal of saving England from the clutches of Prince John, however their strategies differ. She is more logical, whilst Robin is prone to acting rashly, especially when overcome with emotion. They share many tender moments in the forest despite this. Robin remains somewhat jealous of her relationship with Guy, but she remains faithful. In episode 9, Lardner's Ring, Robin proposes to Marian again, which she accepts, but soon finds herself back in the castle with Guy. Marian chooses this as the only option to keep her alliance with Robin from Guy.

In the final episode of series 2, Marian is caught in an attempt to assassinate the Sheriff. She is captured and taken to the Holy Land, where Robin and the gang are also. Sir Guy of Gisborne stabs Marian, mortally wounding her, in a rage caused by her admitting she is in love and engagement to Robin Hood. Robin and Marian are married as she lies dying. Robin assures Marian that he will keep fighting, although he expresses that he cannot without her. A montage sequence is shown of Robin's memories of their life as he carries Marian to her grave.

Series 3 takes place months after Marian's death, as Robin and the remaining outlaws return to England. Robin, now bent on avenging his wife's murder, sends away his friends out of anger (and a personal desire to ensure they don't meet the same fate) and heads to Locksley to kill Gisborne. Their vicious fight ends with Robin being thrown over a cliff. He is rescued by Brother Tuck, but a tired and broken Robin refuses his help, claiming that he has nothing more to give and that he has lost all faith in himself. However, when Robin learns that the gang are to be executed, he and Tuck set out to rescue them. During the rescue, Robin manages to pin Gisborne to a wall. Initially intending to murder Gisborne, Robin relents when Guy actually begs for death, contenting himself with merely slashing Gisborne's cheek. He buries Marian's wedding ring shortly afterwards and expresses aloud that he will never stop loving her.

In episode 4, the gang is joined by a girl from Locksley called Kate, who is forced to join Robin's gang when he rescues her from the Sheriff's new tax collector, Rufus. In episode 5 he meets the mysterious Isabella and seems attracted to her, but later learns that she is Gisborne's younger sister. He becomes closer to Isabella in episode 6, sharing a passionate kiss. He convinces her to help him steal Prince John's money, but her loyalty to Robin is questioned by the rest of the gang.

In episode 7, he and Isabella become closer still after Gisborne finds out about their relationship. However, when Robin goes to Kate's aid at the castle, he tells Isabella he can never give up his life as an outlaw. Angry and hurt, Isabella betrays Robin in favour of allying with Prince John. When she becomes Sheriff, Robin continues to hope for an alliance, but the arrival of her husband Thornton ends any hopes of redemption, and after his murder, she reavows to kill Robin Hood.

In episode 10, Bad Blood, Robin is captured along with Guy by a mysterious hooded character. The man reveals that Robin's father and Guy's mother had an illegitimate child whilst Guy's father Sir Roger was fighting in the Holy Land, but had to conceal it when he returned secretly carrying leprosy. After Sir Roger was exposed and cast out, Ghislaine gave birth to a boy named Archer. Guy also discovers that he did not kill his parents by starting a fire as he had previously believed, but his mother had been killed accidentally in a fight between Robin's father and Guy's father, and Sir Roger had stayed with her whilst she died. The stranger is then revealed to be Robin's father, whose face was disfigured in the fire, and he asks Guy and Robin to forgive each other in order to find Archer, who is now in York jail awaiting execution.

In episode 11, The Enemy of my Enemy, Robin takes Gisborne to the camp, but not before having a fight about their parents and Marian. The gang intervene but are shocked when Robin prevents them from slaying him, and tells them that Gisborne is one of them. Robin and Gisborne then travel to York, where Gisborne gets himself arrested so that he can locate Archer in the dungeons. Robin, uses a disguise to convince the Sheriff of York to release Gisborne. However, as a guard takes Robin down to the dungeons, a messenger from Isabella informs York that the pair are murderous criminals. Robin and Gisborne find their brother Archer, who has been having an affair with York's wife and is a supposed master of alchemy, and make their escape with the other prisoners. The trio then get brought to the main hall where Archer betrays them, only to be caught again and put on execution. Before Gisborne is hanged, there is an explosion and Robin and Archer save Gisborne.

In Something Worth Fighting For, Robin and the gang save several men of Locksley from being taken by Sheriff Isabella to help Prince John construct an army against the King. Knowing they are out of time, Robin decides to seize Nottingham Castle and await the return of King Richard from the Holy Land. Isabella attempts to sow discontent among the outlaws by pardoning Allan A Dale of his crimes; this causes him to leave, disgusted that they still have such little faith in him. Although Archer, who has allied with Isabella for easy money, springs an elaborate trap on the outlaws as they try to infiltrate the castle, he eventually betrays his employer and joins the cause of his half-brothers, and they succeed in taking over Nottingham Castle. Much then informs Robin that something has been left at the castle entrance: the dead body of Allan, slain by Vaisey. The gang's mourning for Allan is cut short, by the return of Sheriff Vaisey who has brought a large army. Robin and the gang then retreat into the castle and await Vaisey's inevitable attack.

In the 2009 series finale, Isabella, while fighting Robin, slices his neck with a poisoned blade, though he survives long enough to kill her and the Sheriff and destroy his army. At the end of the episode, the dying Robin bids his gang a final farewell, speaking to each of them in turn, then staggers off to a glade in Sherwood Forest to die peacefully. As he lies dying, a vision of Marian appears before him and the two embrace and enter Heaven. The gang retrieve Robin's corpse for burial, and vow to continue fighting injustice in his name.

=== Sir Guy of Gisborne ===
Guy of Gisborne
- First appearance: "Will You Tolerate This?"
- Last appearance: Something Worth Fighting For Part 2
- Created by: Dominic Minghella; Foz Allan
- Portrayed by: Richard Armitage

In-universe information
- Title: Sir
- Occupation: Outlaw former Sheriff of Nottingham; Sheriff's deputy
- Family: Seth (son); Isabella (sister, deceased); Archer (half-brother); Squire Thornton (brother-in-law, deceased); Roger of Gisborne (father, deceased); Ghislaine (mother, deceased)

Sir Guy of Gisborne, played by Richard Armitage, is a dark, brooding man always clad in black leather. He is the third main character in the first two series after Robin and Marian, and the second main character in the third series after Robin only. Guy is the Sheriff's second-in-command and manages the Locksley estate in Robin's absence. He is reluctant to relinquish control and takes a dark satisfaction in being named permanent lord after Robin is outlawed. His eagerness for land of his own comes from bitterness over having no actual Gisborne estate, and he contemplates renaming Locksley to Gisborne. It is revealed that Gisborne's mother was French, and that after his family lost their land they moved to France.

Guy fathers a child, Seth, with a servant girl, Annie, and later abandons him in the forest, only for the baby to be rescued by Robin and his men. In the words of the Radio Times, Gisborne is "the chief dispenser of the Sheriff's rough justice... seen killing a man in front of his own son."

As in other tales of the Hood legends, he is a suitor of Marian, but she does not return his affections. In episode seven of series one, he practically forces her into an engagement with him. Robin later discovers that Guy is the masked assassin who wounded him in the Holy Land when he tried to prevent him from killing King Richard. Robin slashes his tattoo during the fray, and Robin realises that it was Guy when he sees his tattoo with an identical scar through it. Robin kidnaps and tortures Guy after he finds out, and attempts to reveal Guy's treachery to the public, but the Sheriff foils hopes of incrimination by burning the tattoo from Gisborne's skin with acid. Robin later locates Gisborne's physician, who under duress reveals that, when Gisborne was supposedly ill in Locksley, he had in fact left for the Holy Land. However, the physician is killed shortly afterwards, ending any chance of proving Gisborne's guilt.

Just before their wedding is due to go ahead, Marian disguises herself as the Night Watchman and attempts to steal a chest of money from Guy, which she describes to her father as "a final fling to make me more comfortable in my marriage". Unaware that it is his fiancée, Guy stabs her in the stomach. After being cared for by Robin and Djaq, she recovers for the wedding, but decides not to marry Guy at the last minute; she punches him and runs from the altar.

Gisborne is evidently not completely evil, as he lacks the Sheriff's sadistic glee and even seems at times to disapprove. When three young boys witness an incriminating event in Childhood, Gisborne attempts to spare their lives even though the Sheriff wants them dead. He risks his own life to help Marian when the Earl of Winchester demands her as part of a deal in For England!. He does show remorse for his villainous ways in the final episode of the first series and lets Marian leave after she goes to warn Robin of the Sheriff's plan. However, this rejection weighs heavily on him at the start of the second series, and he chooses to burn down the home of Marian's father when the Sheriff decides to place the family under watch in the castle.

In Get Carter, Guy breaks down and confesses to Marian his desire for a home and her love. She resists him at first, saying that she needs time to grieve her father's recent death. But when Guy is turning to leave, she kisses him but only in order to protect a fleeing Robin from Guy's view. Marian leaves despite his pleas for her to stay and she returns to the forest.

In the series two finale, A Good Day to Die, a panicked Marian offers Guy her hand if he assassinates the Sheriff before he can oversee the murder of King Richard (though she does think that Robin Hood is already dead by this time). Guy instead alerts the Sheriff of Marian's offer and decides to wed her regardless of her approval. During the final battle within an abandoned Saracen town between Robin's men and the Sheriff's assassins, King Richard is wounded and put at the mercy of an advancing Gisborne. Realising that Guy is consumed with power and greed, Marian stands between Guy and the King, informing him that she loves only Robin. An enraged Gisborne finally snaps and runs Marian through with a sword; shocked and horrified by his own actions, he flees the fort with the Sheriff on horseback. Marian dies in Robin's arms, after they exchange vows and love for one another.

In series 3 he continues to attempt to kill Robin, while being tormented by guilt for killing Marian (in the episode Total Eclipse he pleads with Robin to kill him and end his hell, though Robin coldly refuses). His hatred for Robin seems to grow once he learns of Robin and Marian's marriage. He also grows increasingly antagonistic with the Sheriff, until a deal involving slaves to raise taxes for Prince John is foiled. The Sheriff sends Gisborne to be punished by Prince John. However, his time in the prince-regent's court proves fruitful, and he returns with members of the Prince's guard to kill Robin without interference. However, his younger sister Isabella arrives on the scene, and Gisborne is defeated again. It is revealed that Guy sold his sister into marriage at the age of 13 to finance his own career.

Guy is shown initially to have a close relationship with Prince John, who seems to hold him in high esteem. He, therefore, is more than willing to demonstrate his loyalty by killing the Sheriff in Do You Love Me?. When installed as Sheriff, Guy learns that Isabella is league with the outlaws, and arranges an elaborate trap to kill her and Robin. When they survive, Prince John threatens to dismiss Guy, and he angrily tells him that he considers him "a fraud, a fake and "a pretender". The prince-regent attacks Guy only to fall into a pit, after telling Guy that his days as a free man are over.

Isabella captures Guy in The King is Dead, Long Live the King... by poisoning his wound, throws him in the dungeons and sentences him to death. Squire Thornton, Isabella's estranged husband who briefly takes power as Sheriff, throws Isabella's feisty new companion, Meg, in a cell next to Guy's. At first Meg clearly states that she despises Guy, but after he helps her to quench her thirst and gives her some food she takes a liking to him. Guy also appears to show some of the decency he once showed Marian.

After being released by Isabella, Meg feeds Guy before attempting to set him free by stealing the dungeon keys. However, Isabella catches Meg trying to free Gisborne, sentencing both to execution. The two then escape thanks to Robin, who agrees that Meg does not deserve death. However, Meg is stabbed during the escape. Guy flees with her, and after finding somewhere solitary he lays her down and the two kiss briefly. Meg then dies in Guy's arms.

Some days later, Guy encounters Robin in Sherwood Forest and a fight nearly ensues, but he and Robin are rendered unconscious by two darts. When he awakes, a hooded figure speaks of he and Robin having a half-brother, Archer, who faces execution. They are spurred on to rescue him when the stranger reveals himself to be Robin's father. In the immediate aftermath, Guy and Robin agree to work together, but their relationship is immediately strained when an argument over their parents inevitably turns into a fight regarding Marian. Robin relents after Gisborne remarks he will never beg forgiveness as he cannot forgive himself. Robin spares Gisborne from the gang's wrath and together they head to York, where they are successful in escaping with Archer, but he is unwilling to form an alliance and decides to join up with his half-sister to get some money. In Something Worth Fighting For, Guy informs Robin that there is a secret entrance to Nottingham Castle constructed by the previous Sheriff, and that they can use it to seize the castle for a returning King Richard. He, Robin, and Much enter, but are submerged in limestone and left for dead. Archer then switches sides (after seeing Kate, Tuck, John, and several men from Lockley risk their lives for their freedom) and he and Kate free the trio to seize the castle. The gang then find the dead body of Allan at the castle gates. Their mourning is short-lived when Sheriff Vaisey returns to take back Nottingham. The gang, including Guy and Isabella, retreat into the castle.

In the end, Gisborne refuses to abandon the outlaws and aids them in their final battle. Gisborne meets his end when the Sheriff and Isabella mortally wound him in a sword fight in a secret tunnel under Nottingham Castle. Gisborne tries to push Robin away from Isabella's blade, but only ends up placing himself in reach of the Sheriff and his sister, who both run him through without mercy. As he lies dying, Gisborne apologises to Robin for everything he has done to the outlaws, and the two old enemies make their peace with each other. In his final moments, Gisborne expresses regret that unlike Robin, he doesn't have someone waiting for him, musing on his unrequited love for Marian, and thanks Robin for allowing Gisborne to die with a sense of pride in himself, having lived a life of shame. His final words, "I am free", likely mean that, in death, he finally escaped the living hell his life had become.

=== Vaisey, Sheriff of Nottingham ===
Vaisey
- First appearance: "Will You Tolerate This?"
- Last appearance: "Something Worth Fighting For, Part 2"
- Created by: Dominic Minghella; Foz Allan
- Portrayed by: Keith Allen

In-universe information
- Title(s): Sire, Sir, Sheriff
- Occupation: Sheriff of Nottingham
- Family: Davina (sister, deceased)

The Sheriff of Nottingham is the main antagonist of the show. Keith Allen's portrayal was described by The Hollywood Reporter as "very camp in the Alan Rickman tradition of sardonic villains," referring to Rickman's role as the Sheriff in the 1991 film Robin Hood: Prince of Thieves. Cynical, sarcastic and with a dark sense of humour, he has many catch phrases, including "La di da di da!" and "A clue: no." He also has an explosive temper, usually triggered by Robin's interference or the repeated failures of Gisborne and other minions.

Vaisey becomes the Sheriff a few years before Robin's return to England, taking over from Marian's father Edward. He uses the position to become the leading figure in the Black Knights, a group conspiring to overthrow King Richard in favour of Prince John, and begins plotting the King's death in the second series. As a plot device to explain why Robin does not kill the Sheriff, John insures the latter's life by promising to destroy Nottingham should he be killed.

Keith Allen lost one of his teeth while filming a fight sequence for the show. This was written into the script, with the Sheriff losing a tooth in the last episode of series 1. He takes teeth from skulls and places them in the gap as a recurring gag in the second series. In Sisterhood, the Sheriff's sister Davina is introduced, with whom he displays previously unseen affection. Davina dies in his arms after an altercation with Robin, for which the Sheriff vows revenge. Some time later, the Sheriff has the Black Knights sign the Great Pact of Nottingham, a document swearing the loyalty of the lords involved in the conspiracy to kill the King. Robin and the outlaws steal this document, and much of the second series sees the Sheriff foiled in his preparations to kill the King and retrieve the Pact, while Robin successfully sends word to the King regarding the Sheriff's plans. In the final episodes, the Sheriff and Gisborne decide to surprise and kill the King in the Holy Land, taking the captive Marian with them. Although the Sheriff sends mercenaries to kill Robin before leaving, the outlaws escape and pursue the Sheriff and Gisborne to the Holy Land, prompting them to send an agent to turn Richard against Robin, and then abandon Marian in the desert with him. The outlaws are freed by the King's personal bodyguard Carter, and save Richard from walking into the Sheriff's trap. The battle between the two sides enters a deserted village, where Vaisey shoots the King in the back and kills Carter. Although Gisborne kills Marian in cold blood, the arrival of the outlaws leaves the Sheriff badly outnumbered, and he is forced to retreat, with the attempt on King Richard's life a failure.

In the third series, with the Black Knights having collapsed following their failure in the Holy Land, Prince John plays the Sheriff off against Gisborne until Do You Love Me?. Gisborne and the Sheriff fight to the death in a brutal confrontation, both goaded on by Prince John and their own motivations (Gisborne blaming Vaisey for Marian's death and Vaisey believing Gisborne to have failed him). Vaisey is quite surprised by their newfound mutual hatred, commenting that they once loved each other almost like father and son, implying there was more to them than two greedy and ambitious men out for power. The fight ends on the battlements where, as the Sheriff prepares to throw Gisborne to his death, Gisborne stabs him in the chest. The Sheriff seemingly dies, warning Gisborne not to trust Prince John. His death is blamed on Robin, but it is shown at the end of the episode that the Sheriff survived; as his apparently dead body is carted away, his hand clenches into a fist. The Sheriff returns in the series 3 finale: after killing Allan A Dale to prevent him warning the outlaws of his return, he arrives at Nottingham with a vast army in tow, just as Isabella has been ousted by the outlaws. It is assumed that Vaisey has been planning this for some time, as he has his second-in-command, a former minion of Isabella's called Blamire, weaken the city defences and pave the way for his return. Blamire flees the city before Isabella's downfall and informs his master that "the plan is in place". Satisfied, the Sheriff orders his army onto the attack.

In the last episode of series 3, the Sheriff easily smashes aside Nottingham's defences and storms the city, and orders the entire population to be slaughtered. It is unknown whether this attack is being done on Prince John's orders, or for Vaisey's personal vengeance. His main goal, other than Nottingham's capture, is to ensure Robin's death and personally kill Gisborne, whose betrayal cuts him deeply. Though Vaisey succeeds in causing the deaths of Gisborne and Robin, Robin shoots a flaming arrow into Nottingham Castle, igniting the stored barrels of Byzantine fire inside. The Sheriff has just enough time to realise what is in the barrels before they explode, obliterating the castle, and killing him, Isabella, and his entire army.

=== Marian ===
Marian of Knighton
- Robin Hood character
- First appearance: "Will You Tolerate This?"
- Last appearance: Something Worth Fighting For - Part 2
- Created by: Dominic Minghella; Foz Allan
- Portrayed by: Lucy Griffiths

In-universe information
- Title: Lady
- Occupation: Night Watchman
- Spouse: Robin of Locksley

Lady Marian of Knighton, (known as Marian) portrayed by Lucy Griffiths, is the twenty-one year old daughter of the former Sheriff of Nottingham. She is engaged to Robin as a teenager before he goes to fight in the crusades. She is visibly cold and aloof toward him on his return. Marian is initially disapproving of Robin's outlaw status because she believes that the best way to fight injustice is to work inside the system. However, she aids him in his fight against the Sheriff by frequently giving him inside information about the Sheriff's plots and deceives Gisbourne to do so. Marian also fights the Sheriff in her own right, disguising herself as the Night Watchman, giving the poor food and supplies.

Marian is beautiful and carries some status with her, as the daughter of Edward, the old Sheriff. For those reasons, Guy of Gisbourne, a dispossessed lord and Vaisey's right-hand man, wants her as his wife. He is obsessive. She rebuffs his attentions, unable to look past his cruelty, but as time goes on, her status and beauty are not the only reasons why Guy wants her - he finds himself wondering if her pure heart and empathy could end his compulsive evil and bring about his redemption upon marriage.

In the first series, she is coerced by Guy into agreeing to marry him when he suspects her of helping Robin. It is agreed the wedding will happen when King Richard returns to England. Though she does so to protect both herself and her father from his wrath. Marian is head-strong and no-nonsense, if often derisive of Robin's arrogance and cocky attitude towards her. But despite this, her ongoing love for him is evident as the series progresses, and they share many tender moments in secret. When King Richard appears to return to England (he is, in fact, an impostor), Marian must fulfill her promise, and Guy immediately prepares their wedding. In one final act of defiance against him, she dresses as the Night Watchman and attempts to steal from him, but he stabs her as she makes her escape, unaware that she is Marian. Djaq cares for her and manages to revive her. Robin and Marian express regret over the ending of their past involvement. Robin exclaiming that he should not have gone to war and left her. Before they can admit their love, they are interrupted by Djaq returning with medicine. Marian rests with Robin beside her. In the morning, Marian appears to have died, and the penultimate episode ends with Robin mourning over her body, repeating his love for her.

It is revealed in the next episode that her body only briefly shut down as a result of a concoction that she had been given by the physician Pitts. Regaining her health shortly afterward, Marian questions Guy about his role in the Holy Land. His denial leaves Marian without a legal argument to break her engagement and arrives to marry Guy. Robin is heart-broken and decides to leave Nottingham. The wedding is interrupted by a frantic Much, who informs her that the King is an impostor, and that it is a ruse to weed out the Sheriff's enemies. In the hope of forgiveness, Guy admits that he knew of the plan, but Marian punches him and flees the wedding. Robin rides up on horseback to greet her and Much, and Marian rides off with him. When they arrive at the castle to expose the Sheriff's plot, she and Robin share a kiss.

In the second series, Marian and her father are under house arrest in Nottingham Castle. Marian cannot travel out of the castle without an armed guard, although she manages to on several occasions. Often avoiding an armed chaperon, Marian manages to successfully deliver information to Robin.

In series 2, it is evident that Robin and Marian's relationship has grown stronger; however, Marian is still under the watchful eye of Guy, who is ignorant of her being the Night Watchman and Robin's informer. His feelings for her become deeper. However, she still remains faithful to Robin. She keeps a friendly relationship with Guy, which enables her to give information to Robin. When Allan A Dale is exposed as a traitor and becomes employed by Gisbourne openly, she threatens with death to persuade not to turn her over. When her father dies, she agrees to join Robin in Sherwood Forest. However, this is strenuous on their relationship. They reconcile and are able to acknowledge their mission is the foremost concern. In Lardner's Ring, episode 9, Robin proposes to Marian. She accepts. However, in order to preserve her alliance with Robin, Marian with a reluctant Robin's help, pretends she was captured by him. Guy believes the lie and she returns to the castle. Marian hides the ring from Gisbourne, wearing it only in private.

Towards the end of the series, Marian is exposed as the Nightwatchman, and prepared for execution. However, Guy decides to spare her if she agrees to never become the Night Watchman again. When she learns of the Sheriff's plan to kill King Richard in the Holy Land, she unsuccessfully tries to kill him, and is taken as a prisoner with Vaisey's party. In (We Are Robin Hood!), she tries to assassinate the Sheriff one last time, and is fated to join the outlaws to die in the desert. Having escaped this, Marian shields King Richard as Guy advances on the injured King. She admits her relationship with Robin and expresses that she would rather die than be with Guy, to which he responds by stabbing her with his sword. Only after this does Robin arrive, and Guy retreats with the Sheriff. Marian marries Robin while she lies mortally wounded. Pulling out the sword, knowing her fate. She dies in Robin's arms and is carried to her grave. They bury her alongside Carter (who also dies in the episode) in the Holy Land, beside an oasis and a palm tree.

Robin sets out to avenge her death by killing Sir Guy. He is not successful but returns to lead his gang. In the series three finale, a poisoned Robin is visited by Marian as a vision. Robin expresses "I knew I would find you again" to which Marian replies "it's time - the greatest adventure is yet to come". They embrace and vanish to the afterlife.

=== Little John ===
Little John
- First appearance: "Will You Tolerate This?"
- Last appearance: "Something Worth Fighting For, Part 2"
- Created by: Dominic Minghella; Foz Allan
- Portrayed by: Gordon Kennedy

In-universe information
- Occupation: Outlaw
- Family: Little John Jr (son)
- Spouse: Alice

Little John, played by Gordon Kennedy, is a former resident of Locksley. John is outlawed many years before the show; his wife Alice and his son Little John jr. believe that he is dead until Dead Man Walking. Prior to meeting Robin, John is the leader of an outlaw band in the forest consisting of Roysten White, Forrest, and Hanton. The band captures Robin, Much, and Allan at the end of the first episode, departing from the traditional meeting of John and Robin where they battle with quarterstaffs over who can cross a river first. "We had a different version for their meeting and we had something so horrible going on in the episode that a jolly fight was entirely inappropriate," the programme's showrunner Dominic Minghella told the Radio Times. John dislikes Robin initially, but agrees to follow him when he realises that Robin can help the people of Locksley. He is unaware that Alice is still living in Locksley, or that she has had his son until Will Scarlett tells him. He is a bit cantankerous and bad-tempered, but loyal to the group, and reacts the most violently when he discovers the treachery of Roy and Allan A Dale. He also acts quite fatherly to some younger members, such as Will and Marian (both of whom lose their fathers in series 2), and Kate when she leaves her family in series 3. He is physically the strongest of the outlaws and generally fights with a quarterstaff.

In the series three finale, Robin comes up with a plan to seize the castle for King Richards' return and he, Much, and Gisborne decide to enter the castle via a secret tunnel dug by the previous Sheriff. While the trio go down the tunnel, Tuck and John are tasked by Robin with entering the main gates of the castle, killing the guards, and seizing a goods train with the livestock and possessions of the Locksley villagers on board. Knowing that it may be some time before he and the gang can do another food drop, Robin tells John that the Lockley villagers must get their possessions back. However, realising that they are unwilling to fight to get them back, Tuck tells John that when the gates are opened they will sit in the road and block the way, forming a non-violent protest. John is shocked by Tuck's decision but reluctantly agrees. When Tuck is shot with an arrow by Isabella, John is ready to defend his friend, but Tuck stops John from attacking the guards. Kate then joins them and tells the guards that if they want to kill John, Tuck, and the men from Locksley then Isabella will have to kill her first. As the guards prepare to kill them, Archer saves them and a fight breaks out with Tuck, John, and the men from Locksley taking on the guards. They are successful and seize the castle for King Richard. While the gang celebrate capturing Isabella and the castle, Much finds a body and the gang discover it to be that of Allan A Dale, who the gang accused of being a traitor after Isabella pardoned him for helping her earlier in the episode. John, along with the rest of the gang, is then angry at himself for not believing Allan's claims of innocence, and he carries Allan's body into the castle as the gang retreat inside after Gisborne spots an army approaching on the horizon.

At the end of the 2009 finale, Little John, along with the remaining outlaws, promises to continue fighting injustice in Robin Hood's name after Robin's death.

=== Much ===
Much
- First appearance: "Will You Tolerate This?"
- Last appearance: "Something Worth Fighting For Part 2"
- Created by: Dominic Minghella; Foz Allan
- Portrayed by: Sam Troughton

In-universe information
- Title: Earl of Bonchurch
- Occupation: Outlaw former manservant

Much, portrayed by Sam Troughton, is Robin's right-hand man and best friend. He was Robin's manservant before and during their service in the King's guard in the Holy Land. Much is known to be rather daft, forever hungry, and committed to both Robin and his cause. Much yearns for the quiet life: the warmth of the home fire and a little well-earned luxury. He often gets into scrapes (particularly in series 1), from which Robin has to rescue him. He is the voice of reason fear, undercutting Robin's idealism. Much likes orderly living in the outlaws' camp and is usually the chef, complaining that he has to catch and cook the food. Much makes it obvious that he does not want be in the forest, but if he weren't at his best friend's side, he would wither and die. He often complains that Robin continues to treat him like a servant and doesn't listen to his opinion, although the root of these complaints is that Robin refuses to discuss the horrors the pair witnessed in the Holy Land. Both characters experience PTSD.

Over the three series, Much matures somewhat during his life as an outlaw, due to the horrible situations that he witnesses. He is still best friends with Robin, and Much proves that he will always support his leader, no matter how unsavoury the mission. In the first series, he is rewarded the estate of Bonchurch for his heroism in the Holy Land, and briefly takes up his role as lord of the manor there. He falls in love with his servant Eve, who is a spy for the Sheriff. After choosing to return to the outlaws, Much promises that he will find Eve once peace and justice are brought to England. In the third series he develops secret feelings for Kate, who does not feel the same way and only considers him to be a friend.

In the 2009 series finale, Much is shown wanting revenge against the Sheriff of Nottingham for Allan's murder. He is shocked when he finds out that Robin has been poisoned and distraught when he makes his final goodbyes. He and everyone else in the gang vow to keep fighting in his name.

=== Allan A Dale ===
Allan A Dale
- First appearance: "Will You Tolerate This?"
- Last appearance: "Something Worth Fighting For: Part 2"
- Created by: Dominic Minghella; Foz Allan
- Portrayed by: Joe Armstrong

In-universe information
- Occupation: Outlaw
- Family: Tom (brother, deceased)

In contrast to the traditional depiction of Alan-a-Dale as a minstrel, Allan (played by Joe Armstrong) is an opportunist and pathological liar. In the first series' premiere, he is rescued by Robin after being caught poaching. He attempts to escape punishment by claiming he is a resident of Locksley to gain Robin's pardon, but only succeeds in joining the fate of hanging. He joins Robin as an outlaw after being saved from the noose. He claims to have come from Rochdale, hence his surname. His brother Tom, also a compulsive liar and thief, is hanged by the Sheriff in Brothers in Arms. Allan uses a sword in most fights in the first two series, but takes to fighting with two in the third.

In the second series, Allan becomes a reluctant informer for Guy of Gisborne, agreeing to spy on Robin for money and release from Nottingham's dungeon. After his betrayal is unmasked by Robin, he enters Gisborne's service. He provides Gisborne with vital information about the outlaws, but protects some secrets such as Marian's identity as the Night Watchman and the location of the camp (partly out of a guilty conscience, but also due to Marian's threats to kill him if he reveals this information). In A Good Day to Die, he leaves Gisborne to rescue Robin and the others, rejoining them in time for their voyage to the Holy Land.

At the start of series three, Allan and the rest of the gang have been travelling for months since they ventured off into the Holy Land, and an exhausted and heartbroken Robin (following Marian's murder) calls Allan a traitor to dismiss him and the rest of the gang. During series three, Allan is reminded on numerous occasions that he once betrayed their loyalty, and throughout the series he tries to prove that he is back on their side. Allan also appears to have feelings towards Locksley villager Kate, but backs down slightly when he hears that Much also has interest in her.

In Something Worth Fighting For - Part One, Sheriff Isabella tries to break Robin's gang down by making false accusations about certain members. She informs Nottingham that Allan has been pardoned for all his previous crimes by helping her. Realising that they have nearly been foiled occasionally, the gang are unsure whether to believe Allan when he claims his innocence. Seeing they still have little faith in him, Allan tries to leave but is tied up. When the gang have gone to Nottingham to seize the castle, Allan breaks free and, tired with the gang's mistrust of him, leaves to make his own way. However, he sees an army approaching Nottingham and, recognising its leader, decides that he has to warn his friends. He is discovered by several guards and manages to fight his way free, only to be killed in a hail of arrows (one to the leg and three to the back) as he makes a run for it. Before dying, he has enough time to recognise his killer; he is shocked to see an old face has returned (Vaisey, The Old Sheriff).

After being killed by Vaisey, his body is wrapped and left at the entrance to Nottingham Castle, where he is later found by Much. As they mourn their loss, the outlaws see the old Sheriff and his army approaching. They then retreat into the castle, with Little John carrying Allan's body. They cremate him shortly afterwards, all deeply hurt by his death and guilty over their mistrust. At the cremation, Allan is referred to as "our loyal friend".

=== Will Scarlett ===
Will Scarlett
- First appearance: "Will You Tolerate This?"
- Last appearance: We Are Robin Hood
- Created by: Dominic Minghella; Foz Allan
- Portrayed by: Harry Lloyd

In-universe information
- Occupation: former Outlaw
- Family: Dan (father, deceased), Luke (brother), Jane (mother, deceased)
- Spouse: (implied) Djaq

The youngest member of the group at nineteen, Will (played by Harry Lloyd) is the son of Locksley's carpenter. Prior to the first episode, his mother dies from starvation and his father loses a hand in punishment for Will and his brother poaching food to survive. In the first series' premier, he is to be hanged for stealing flour, but is saved by Robin, whom he joins in the forest as an outlaw.

In contrast with the traditionally hot-tempered Will Scarlet, this incarnation is generally slow to anger, quiet, shy, and often a voice of reason. He seems to get on best with Allan before he betrays them, perhaps because they share the same experience of nearly being hanged. He also seems to get on well with John, who seems to take the role of father to the younger outlaws. Because of his knowledge of carpentry, he often finds unique ways of helping the gang; he is the architect for the secret camp constructed prior to the second series, and disguises weapons as instruments when infiltrating a fair. He usually fights with an axe, using a smaller one for carpentry. He learns that Djaq is really a woman before the other outlaws, and soon realizes he is falling in love with her.

In The Return of the King, Will and Allan consider leaving the outlaws to go to Scarborough and stay with Will's family. However, in A Clue: No, they decide against it, only to return to the news that Marian is dead. Will is the only one seen with tears at her body.

In The Angel of Death, Will's father Dan is killed by the Sheriff. Mad with grief, Will sets out to poison the Sheriff, in spite of the destruction of Nottingham that would result. Only after he is led to believe Robin is dying after drinking the poison does he relent.

In A Good Day to Die, he finds out that Djaq loved him from the very beginning and she thinks herself foolish for not admitting it. They kiss and then fight for each other's lives. At the end of We Are Robin Hood!, he decides to stay in the Holy Land with Djaq, and it is implied they are to be married. He bids Robin farewell by holding his tag, and declaring "We are Robin Hood!" for the last time.

Will does not appear in the third series.

=== Djaq ===
Introduced in the episode Turk Flu, Djaq (played by Anjali Jay) is a Saracen who is being transported as a slave. Her true name is Saffiya, but she disguises herself as a boy by adopting her dead twin brother's name and appearance. Though Robin's outlaws are shocked when Will reveals that she is a woman, they permit her to stay. She maintains her disguise as a boy in Series 1 to protect herself in the event of her capture by the Sheriff, although Vaisey sees through the ruse after he takes her prisoner, and she adopts a more feminine attire in series 2.

Djaq's father is a physician, and she herself has considerable knowledge of medicine and chemistry, which she uses to serve as the group's medic and to create black powder. She expresses fondness for the entire gang of outlaws, even Allan following his defection. In A Good Day to Die, she and Will express their mutual love for each other; they remain in the Holy Land at the end of the second series. It is implied that they are going to marry.

Djaq is not one of the traditional characters in the Robin Hood legends, although she does follow in the latter-day tradition of a Saracen character being added to the band of outlaws. (See Nasir in Robin of Sherwood from the 1980s, Azeem (a Moor) from Robin Hood: Prince of Thieves in 1991, Achoo from Robin Hood: Men in Tights in 1993 and Kemal from The New Adventures of Robin Hood from the 1990s). She is, however, the first female Saracen character to feature in this role.

Djaq does not appear in the third series.

=== Tuck ===
Played by David Harewood, he is a warrior monk. Tuck trains as a priest at Fountains Abbey, but he becomes more and more disillusioned with the corruption of church and state and is eventually kicked out for his outspoken views. He travels as a monk across Europe, and his experiences from his travels and his years in the Abbey make him realise that time is running out for England: something has to be done now to stop the corruption.

An outspoken, passionate character who generally favours taking action, Tuck's left-field thinking can either be ingenious or make him a liability, particularly if goes against Robin's orders and if the plans go wrong. However, Robin can see the value in Tuck; he is strong and wise, an inspiring second in command. His passion for the cause is infectious and binds the outlaws strongly together.

=== Prince John ===
Prince John
- First appearance: "Do You Love Me?"
- Last appearance: "The King is Dead, Long Live the King"
- Created by: Dominic Minghella; Foz Allan
- Portrayed by: Toby Stephens

In-universe information
- Title: Sire
- Occupation: Prince Regent
- Family: King Richard (older brother); Queen Eleanor (mother)

Prince John, portrayed by Toby Stephens, is the tyrannical ruler of England in Richard the Lionheart's absence. Depicted as effeminate, paranoid, and narcissistic, he is desperate for admiration and is constantly demanding that his subjects tell him how much they love him. John is also noted for being as ruthless and sadistic as the Sheriff, ordering Locksley's church, full of adoring villagers, to be burned down while a wedding takes place inside. John is obsessively determined to usurp his brother Richard the Lionheart's throne and become King of England, a position which he feels greatly entitled to, particularly since he feels it was their father Henry II's wish that he become king. He is shown to possess a high level of charisma and intelligence, but also a fiery temper with unpredictable mood swings. He reacts violently to criticism and is oblivious to why the people of England don't love him, despite his vicious treatment of them. In the second episode in which he appears, John appears to have succumbed to the fact that the English people have no affection for him, saying "If you won't love me, then by God, you'll fear me." He is also manipulative, turning Sheriff Vaisey and Guy of Gisborne against each other for nothing other than his personal amusement by playing on their increasing mutual hatred. John appears somewhat emotionally immature and is easily bored, with his catchphrases being "Do you love me?", "Long live me." and "Bored now."

In The King is Dead, Long Live the King, it is revealed that John is consumed with anger and hatred toward his brother Richard, whom he sees as having usurped their mother's affection and overshadowed him. Despite his envy of Richard, John still holds himself to be absolutely superior to his brother and believes that he is destined for the throne. John has a waxwork made of Richard to try to fool people into thinking Richard is dead, so that John can become king. However, Robin Hood and the gang discover this and stop the coronation. Prince John leaves Nottingham after installing Isabella as Sheriff.

John is shown to be a capable swordsman, having engaged Robin and Guy (both highly skilled swordsmen) in combat, despite the historical King John I's supposed lack of military prowess, which earned him the epithet "Softsword".

=== Isabella ===
Isabella of Gisborne
- Robin Hood character
- First appearance: "Let the Games Commence"
- Last appearance: "Something Worth Fighting For, Part 2"
- Created by: Dominic Minghella; Foz Allan
- Portrayed by: Lara Pulver

In-universe information
- Title(s): Lady, Sheriff, Mistress
- Occupation: False Sheriff of Nottingham
- Family: Guy of Gisborne (brother, deceased); Archer (half-brother); Squire Thornton (husband, deceased); Roger of Gisborne (father, deceased); Ghislaine (mother, deceased); Seth (nephew)

Lady Isabella of Gisborne (formerly Thornton), played by Lara Pulver, is the attractive but power hungry sister of Gisborne. When she appears in Series 3 she is on the verge of becoming Robin's new love interest and 'spy in the enemy camp' at Nottingham. She is very bitter towards Guy because he sold her to her husband, Squire Thornton, when she was thirteen to finance his own political career. Thorton was abusive and cruel to his wife to the point where she fled from her marital home. She is introduced in episode 5 of series 3, having recently escaped, and is saved by Robin in the forest. Her brother catches her in the company of the outlaws and she throws herself on his mercy. In episode 6 she begins a romantic relationship with Robin and begins to flirt with Prince John in order to compete for his favour with her brother.

In episode 7 her relationship with Robin is discovered by Prince John and Guy. After escaping certain death, she tries to convince Robin to leave Sherwood, but he refuses to abandon his cause, having already suffered great pain after Marian's death. An angry Isabella turns on him and joins Prince John's side (after telling him how Gisborne planned to let her live) thus regaining the prince's respect. In episode 8, he appoints Isabella the new Sheriff of Nottingham after Gisborne is outlawed and imprisoned.

She briefly appoints a fellow feminist like herself, Meg, as her deputy, but former husband Thornton arrives, wresting control over Nottingham from her and imprisoning Meg. Robin Hood saves Meg and Guy, but Meg later dies in the arms of Guy. After his cruel treatment becomes too much, she enlists Robin to get rid of him. Robin locks Thornton in an asylum with a threat to kill him if he returns, but he ignores the warning, determined to have his revenge. After Thornton corners her in chapel, Isabella deceives and kills him. Meanwhile, Meg grows attached to Guy while in the dungeons, so Isabella orders her to be beheaded alongside him. Robin rescues the pair, but Meg is injured in the escape and dies in Guy's arms. Feeling abandoned by on all sides, Isabella gives into her ambition and turns against the outlaws forever, becoming a tyrant as cruel as Vaisey.

Isabella's half-brother, Archer, made her an enemy of the Sheriff of York after Robin and Gisborne freed him from the dungeons.

In the episode Something Worth Fighting For, she makes an uneasy allegiance with Archer to kill Robin and Guy in a trap Archer has created within a secret tunnel. However, she treats him with nothing but contempt, disgusted that her beloved mother had a bastard child that could be so devious and conniving. Isabella also persuades Kate's mother to plant half a locket on Robin's person (the other belonging to Isabella) to fool Kate into thinking Robin still loves Isabella, also issuing a pardon to Allan A Dale. This plan fails as Kate's mother tells the truth, but Allan vows to leave Sherwood, only to die at the hands of Vaisey. Isabella is eventually captured by the outlaws and barricaded inside the castle when Vaisey arrives with an army.

Isabella escapes her captivity in the series finale and joins Vaisey, giving her title as Sheriff up to him in exchange for her own life. She aids his attack through a secret tunnel into Nottingham and dispatches two of the most significant defenders: Robin and Gisborne, having simultaneously with the Sheriff fatally wounded her brother, and striking Robin with a poisoned dagger. As the outlaws retreat and the Sheriff marches through the tunnel, Isabella seems to give a remorseful last look at her brother's corpse, but stops when Vaisey remarks that there is no time for sentimentality. Ultimately, Isabella perishes when Robin detonates a store of explosive Byzantine fire and Nottingham Castle is destroyed with Isabella and the Sheriff inside.

=== Kate of Locksley ===
Kate is a local girl from Locksley village. Her brother is sold to Irish warriors with drastic results (her efforts to free him end with her capture and his death at the hands of Gisborne). She is hot-headed and, although well-meaning, her outspokenness can have dramatic consequences for others around her. She is played by Joanne Froggatt. Much develops feelings towards her, and in Lost in Translation, after unhelpful advice from Allan (who also flirts with her), Much makes his feelings plain and she rejects him harshly. Her character seems to replace Djaq and to an extent Marian as the only female outlaw. Kate falls for Robin at first sight and gets protectively jealous of him when he shows some interest towards Isabella. She gives him a kiss on the cheek after he rescues her. In episode 9, Robin and Kate kiss and she shares her feelings for him very clearly. At the end of the same episode Robin tells her he does care for her, though it is heavily implied that he doesn't love her as he did Marian, and doesn't believe he ever will. When Robin is dying at the end of the series, Kate tries to give him a final kiss on the lips, but he deliberately turns away from her and settles for just hugging her before he leaves to die alone.

== Recurring characters ==
=== Royston White ===
One of the original forest outlaws, Royston White is introduced at the end of the first episode as part of Little John's band, portrayed by William Beck. Little John and Roy originally dislike the others, but, after persuasion, accept Robin's leadership.

In the fourth episode, Parent Hood, Royston is captured, imprisoned, and tortured by Sir Guy. The Sheriff arrests his mother Mary White and in exchange for her life Roy is instructed to assassinate Robin. He tries, but fails. In the gang's attempt to rescue his mother from being hanged at Nottingham Castle, Royston sacrifices his own life and is slain by the Sheriff's henchmen, while shouting "My name is Royston White, I fight for Robin Hood and King Richard!"

=== Archer ===
Archer
- Robin Hood character
- First appearance: "The Enemy of My Enemy"
- Last appearance: "Something Worth Fighting For, Part 2"
- Created by: Dominic Minghella; Foz Allan
- Portrayed by: Clive Standen

In-universe information
- Family: Sir Guy of Gisborne (half-brother, deceased); Robin Hood (half-brother, deceased); Isabella (half-sister, deceased); Seth (nephew); Marian (sister in law, deceased); Squire Thornton (brother in law, deceased); Malcolm (father, deceased); Ghislaine (mother, deceased)

Archer is the son of Lady Ghislaine, the mother of Isabella and Guy of Gisborne, and Robin Hood's father, Lord Locksley, making him half-brother to Robin, Guy, and Isabella. He gets his name from the distinctive arrow-shaped birthmark on his stomach. He is played by Clive Standen. Archer makes an enemy of the Sheriff of York and is sentenced to death after he claims he can turn useless metal into gold, along with being discovered having an affair with the Sheriff's wife. He is later rescued from York by Robin and Gisborne after the pair are informed by Robin's dying father that he is their half-brother. When Archer realises that both Robin and Guy gave up their money and land the minute they became outlaws, he is unimpressed and takes Robin hostage so he can escape, especially when he learns his half-sister is the exceedingly wealthy Sheriff of Nottingham. However, the plan fails, and Archer and the others have to rely on Robin's gang to save them from death.

After escaping from York, he heads to Nottingham where he meets his half-sister Sheriff Isabella, with whom he makes a deal to trap and kill Robin and Guy when they enter a secret tunnel —constructed by Vaisey— to reach and seize the castle. He is successful in doing this and Robin and Guy are nearly killed after they are submerged in limestone. Archer is then paid and told by Isabella to leave Nottingham forever, as she has nothing but contempt for him, because she sees his existence as defiling the memory of her beloved mother. As he leaves, he sees Little John, Brother Tuck, and the men from Locksley village sitting outside the castle blocking anyone and anything from leaving until they get their crops, animals, and possessions back. Seeing that Tuck, John, and the men are willing to risk their lives to fight for themselves, King, and country, Archer kills several guards, helps Kate free Robin, and then helps the gang seize the castle moments before Vaisey returns with a vengeance.

Archer is shocked and scared when Vaisey uses Byzantine fire to bomb Nottingham. He admits to being the one who sold Vaisey the ingredients in the first place, leading to an argument with Robin. When Robin is poisoned by Isabella, Archer finally sees what it is to be a true hero and becomes a member of Robin's gang. He and Tuck then create their own Byzantine fire. When Robin is about to die he helps him to reach Vaisey in time, Robin then kills both Vaisey and Isabella with his last bit of strength. Archer is amongst the mourners at Robin's funeral in Sherwood. Following the deaths of Guy of Gisborne and Robin Hood of Locksley, Archer vows to continue the fight against Prince John.

=== Edward ===
Edward, played by Michael Elwyn, is Marian's father, and the former Sheriff of Nottingham. He is replaced by Vaisey, but is able to attain status as the lord of Knighton Manor. Unbeknownst to Edward, his daughter is secretly the Night Watchman, a masked figure who delivers food, medicine, and supplies to the poor of Nottingham. Edward discovers this in Turk Flu. He is initially angry at Marian's deception, fearing for her and his own safety, but begrudgingly accepts who his daughter truly is. When Edward discovers that King Richard is returning in the penultimate episode of the first series, he organises an uprising of loyal nobles to give evidence against the Sheriff in order to prevent the King's assassination. Unbeknownst to the nobles, the King is in truth an impostor, hired to aid the Sheriff in flushing out his enemies. However, Edward is warned of the plot, and prevented from giving evidence to a disguised Sheriff by Robin. However, the Sheriff still does not trust Edward and Marian, and has Gisborne torch Knighton Hall and place the two of them under house arrest. When Marian forces the Sheriff to give up black diamonds, the Sheriff imprisons Edward in the dungeons as punishment. However, Edward is able to escape the dungeons, and aids Robin in stealing the Great Pact of Nottingham, a charter forcing members of the regicidally treacherous organisation, the Black Knights, to sign their loyalty. Edward is stabbed by Canon Birkley, and gives the Great Pact to Robin. His last words are a message for his daughter: "it's good to dream."

== See also ==
- List of films and television series featuring Robin Hood
