= Joe Armstrong (actor) =

English actor (born 1978)

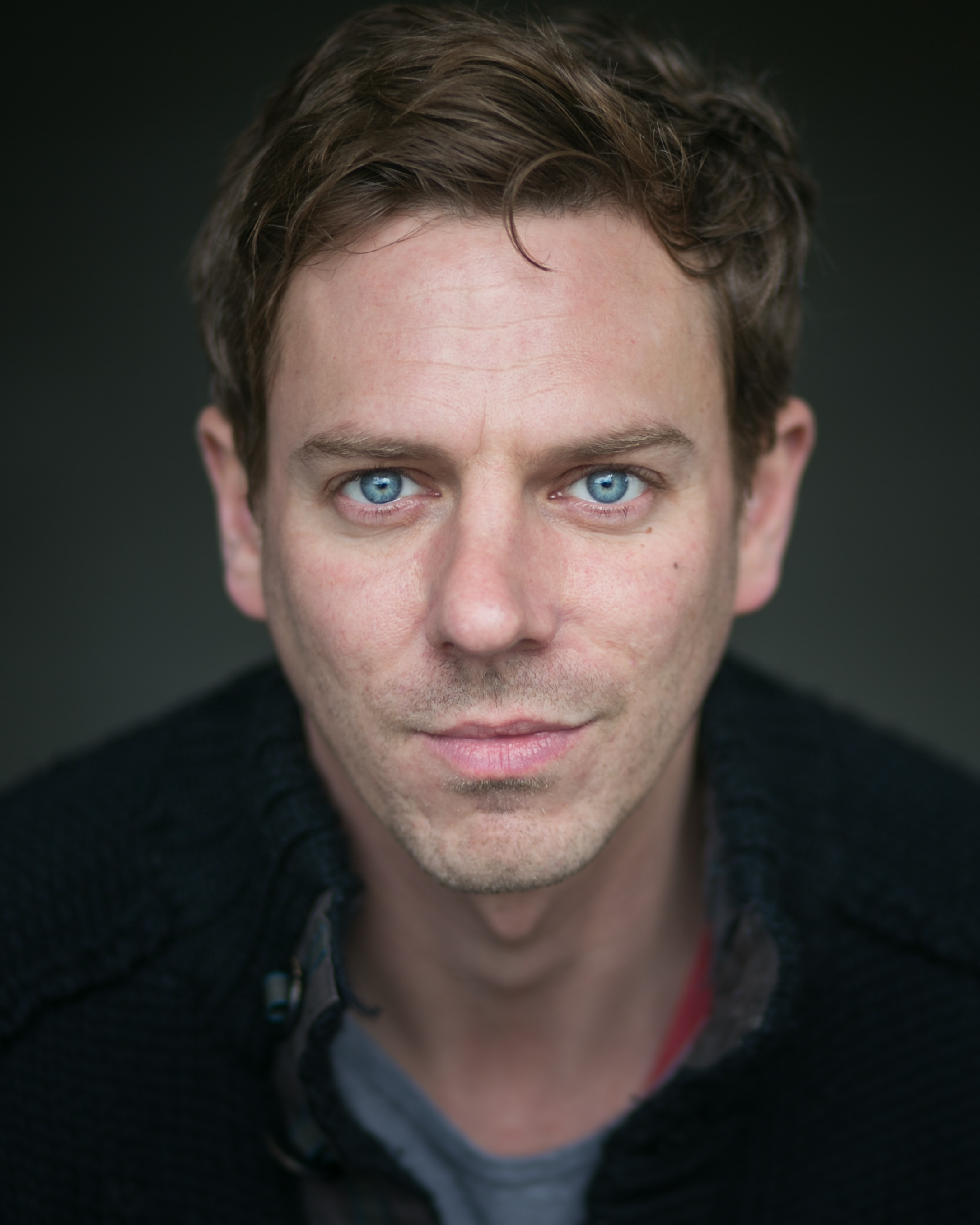
- Armstrong in 2016
- Born: 7 October 1978 (age 47); London, England
- Occupation: Actor
- Years active: 1998–present
- Parent: Alun Armstrong (father)

Joseph Armstrong (born 7 October 1978) is an English actor. His television roles include Allan A Dale in three series of Robin Hood, Hotspur in Henry IV, Part I, Ashley Cowgill in Happy Valley and Bairstow in The Village. On stage, he played the lead role in D. C. Moore's The Empire and appeared in the 2011 revival of Flare Path. He co-starred with Maxine Peake in Miss Julie at the Royal Exchange and with Louise Brealey in a touring production of Constellations.

== Early life ==
Armstrong was born and raised in London, the son of Sue (née Bairstow) and actor Alun Armstrong. He has an older brother, Tom, and a younger brother, Dan, who was in the band Clock Opera. He attended Elliott School in Putney from 1993 to 1997. He then studied at the University of Bristol, where he acted in The Brecht Project—a collection of scenes from the works of Bertolt Brecht—in 1998 and Women Beware Women in 1999. He is a fan of AFC Wimbledon.

== Career ==
=== Television ===
Joe Armstrong's first television role was a bit part in a 2003 episode of The Bill, followed by a brief appearance in the ITV mini-series Between the Sheets starring his father Alun Armstrong. In the 2004 BBC film Passer By, he had a supporting role as one of two men accused of assaulting a woman on a train. He guest starred in the 2004 Waking the Dead episode "Fugue States" as a young man who reappears with amnesia after being abducted as a child. Also in 2004, he played the son of a murdered farmer in the Foyle's War episode "They Fought in the Fields."

Other television credits include guest spots in Midsomer Murders (2004), Blackpool (2004), Rose and Maloney (2005), another episode of The Bill (2005), The Inspector Lynley Mysteries (2006), Party Animals (2007), The Last Detective (2007) and The Whistleblowers (2007).

In 2006, Armstrong was cast in the BBC series Robin Hood as Allan—based on the legendary figure Alan-a-Dale—who joins Robin's band of outlaws in Sherwood Forest. Allan later becomes allied with the sympathetic villain Guy of Gisborne but has a change of heart and rejoins his friends. Armstrong appeared in all three series from 2006 to 2009. The series was filmed on location in and around Budapest.

Armstrong portrayed Norman Heatley in the 2009 BBC Four film Breaking the Mould about the team who turned penicillin into a viable medicine. In 2010, he co-starred with Billie Piper in the two-part drama A Passionate Woman as the husband of a woman who has an affair. His father Alun Armstrong played the older version of his character.

He guest starred in an episode of Hustle in 2011, and he was a regular cast member in the third series of Land Girls. He appeared in Public Enemies starring Daniel Mays and Anna Friel in 2012.

Armstrong played Hotspur in Richard Eyre's 2012 production of Henry IV, Part I—one of four films in the BBC Two Shakespeare cycle The Hollow Crown. He employed a Geordie accent for the role. Jeremy Irons played Henry IV, with Tom Hiddleston as Prince Hal and Alun Armstrong as Hotspur's father, the Earl of Northumberland.

In the 2013 drama The Village, depicting life in a Derbyshire village in the early 20th century, he played Stephen Bairstow, a detective scarred by his experiences at the Front in World War I. The character was originally a minor one, but writer Peter Moffat expanded the role because he was impressed with Armstrong. He reprised his role in the second series in 2014.

Armstrong played drug dealer-turned-kidnapper Ashley Cowgill in Sally Wainwright's 2014 crime drama Happy Valley, starring Sarah Lancashire. In December 2016 he also appeared as William Allison in Wainwright's To Walk Invisible, a television biopic about the lives of the Bronte family.

In 2016, he appeared in "Hated in the Nation", an episode of the anthology series Black Mirror.

In 2018, he appeared as series regular Gildas in Britannia, Jez Butterworth's historical drama about the Roman conquest of Britain. The following year he played Samuel Washington in the BBC/HBO co-production Gentleman Jack, written by Sally Wainwright.

In 2024, Armstrong appeared in the Harlan Coben Netflix adaptation of 'Fool Me Once' as Alexander Dosman, ex-boyfriend of Claire Walker and father to their son Louis.

=== Theatre ===
Performing with the National Youth Theatre, Armstrong's roles included Gerry Evans in Dancing at Lughnasa in 1998 and Lieutenant Stedna in They Shoot Horses, Don't They? in 2000. He also played Wackford Squeers in Nicholas Nickleby.

In 2003, Armstrong had the dual roles of Adam and Jeff in Protection by Fin Kennedy at the Soho Theatre. He appeared in How Love Is Spelt by Chloe Moss at the Bush Theatre in 2004 and in A Night at the Dogs by Matt Charman at the Soho Theatre in 2005.

At the Edinburgh Festival Fringe in 2009, he played Liam in the Dennis Kelly play Orphans. The play premiered at the Traverse Theatre in August and then moved to the Birmingham Repertory Theatre in September and the Soho Theatre in London in October. Armstrong was nominated for a Stage Award for Best Actor.

In the DC Moore play The Empire, Armstrong starred as Gary, a Lance Corporal in Afghanistan guarding an injured prisoner who claims to be British. Paul Taylor of The Independent wrote: "Gary ... veers between seething anger and low-key sarcasm, an oscillation superbly conveyed by excellent Joe Armstrong." In preparation for the role, Armstrong and other cast members met with soldiers who had served in Afghanistan. The play had a six-week run at the Jerwood Theatre Upstairs in the Royal Court Theatre from March to May 2010 followed by two weeks at the Drum Theatre in the Theatre Royal, Plymouth in May.

Armstrong played RAF tail gunner Dusty Miller in Terence Rattigan's World War II drama Flare Path in 2011. The critically acclaimed revival directed by Trevor Nunn ran from March to June at the Theatre Royal Haymarket.

In 2012, he played Jean in Miss Julie opposite Maxine Peake in the title role at the Royal Exchange Theatre in Manchester. Armstrong described the role as one of his most challenging because of the need to make his character's sudden changes in mood believable. Alfred Hickling of The Guardian remarked that "Joe Armstrong's Jean ... flips back and forth between brute arrogance and fawning servility with the casual manner of tossing a coin."

In a 2013 production of Harold Pinter's The Dumb Waiter at The Print Room, Armstrong played Gus alongside Clive Wood as Ben. Matt Trueman of The Telegraph called Wood and Armstrong "two perfect Pinterians," and Fiona Mountford of The Evening Standard wrote, "Armstrong, always an actor of easy geniality, flourishes in particular with this short, sharp, light-footed humour."

Armstrong co-starred with Louise Brealey in the 2015 touring production of Constellations.

=== Film ===
In 2006, Armstrong was in two short films: A Ticket Too Far and Service. The latter was part of the Coming Up series on Channel 4.

He appears in Nae Caranfil's film Closer to the Moon, also starring Vera Farmiga, Mark Strong and Harry Lloyd, which was filmed in Bucharest in the autumn of 2011 and was released in Romania in 2014. The film is about the bank robbery allegedly committed by the Ioanid Gang in 1959 Romania. Armstrong's character Răzvan is based on the journalist Haralambie Obedeanu who was one of the accused.

In 2017 Armstrong appeared in Joe Wright's war drama Darkest Hour, his major studio debut.

=== Radio ===
Armstrong performed in the BBC radio plays Girl from Mars in 2008 and Hitched in 2010, and he read the story Gifts by Garry Kilworth as part of a Christmas radio programme. In 2011, he co-starred with Richard Briers and Edna Doré in the Radio 4 drama A Shoebox of Snow. Armstrong reprised his role in DC Moore's The Empire for a BBC Radio 3 production. He was in the radio serial Ruthless by Tim Loane on Radio 4 in 2012. In 2013, he played Sergei in a Radio 4 adaptation of Lady Macbeth of Mtsensk, and he appeared in the series The Corrupted by G. F. Newman. He performed in the drama Ghosts of Heathrow in 2014 and in adaptations of The Bone Clocks, The Book Of Strange New Things and The Trial.

== Screen and stage credits ==
=== Film ===
Year	Title	Role	Notes
2006	A Ticket Too Far	Ray	Short film
2014	Closer to the Moon	Răzvan	
2015	The Process	Frank / Terry	
2017	Darkest Hour	John Evans	
2018	The Good Soldier Schwejk	Lieutenant Lucas / Sergeant Flanderka / One Year Volunteer / The Angel	

=== Television ===
Year	Title	Role	Notes
2003	The Bill	Fraser Howie	Series 19, episode 30: "Grandstand"
2003	Between the Sheets	Richard Lloyd	Mini-series; episodes 1–6
2004	Passer By	Tinley	Television film
2004	Waking the Dead	Jason Murphy	Series 4; episodes 5 & 6: "Fugue States: Parts 1 & 2"
2004	Midsomer Murders	David Cooke	Series 8; episode 2: "Dead in the Water"
2004	Foyle's War	Tom Jackson	Series 3; episode 3: "They Fought in the Fields"
2004	Blackpool	Mark Reed	Mini-series; episodes 1, 2 & 4
2005	Rose and Maloney	Max Roche	Series 3; episode 3: "Alan Richmond"
2005	The Bill	Lenny Bartle	Series 21; episode 101: "Honour"
2006	The Inspector Lynley Mysteries	Darren	Series 5; episode 3: "Chinese Walls"
2006	Coming Up	Danny	Series 4; episode 5: "Service"
2006–2009	Robin Hood	Allan A Dale	Series 1–3; 38 episodes
2007	Party Animals	DC Harrison	Episode 6
2007	The Last Detective	Chas	Series 4; episode 1: "Once Upon a Time on the Westway"
2007	The Whistleblowers	Fleck	Episode 4: "Fit for Purpose"
2009	Breaking the Mould	Norman Heatley	Television film
2010	A Passionate Woman	Donald	Mini-series; episode 1
2011	Hustle	Joe Ryan	Series 7; episode 2: "Old Sparks Come New"
2011	Land Girls	Danny Sparks	Series 3; episodes 1–5
2012	Public Enemies	Ben Somers	Mini-series; episodes 1–3
2012	The Hollow Crown	Hotspur	Mini-series 1; episode 2: "Henry IV, Part I and Part II"
2013–2014	The Village	Stephen Bairstow	Series 1 & 2; 11 episodes
2014	Happy Valley	Ashley Cowgill	Series 1; episodes 1–6
2016	Black Mirror	Nick Shelton	Series 3; episode 6: "Hated in the Nation"
2016	To Walk Invisible	William Allison	Television film
2017–2018	Britannia	Gildas	Series 1; episodes 1–9
2019–2022	Gentleman Jack	Samuel Washington	Series 1 & 2; 14 episodes
2023	The Bay	Dean Metcalf	Series 4; episodes 1–6
2024	Fool Me Once	Alexander Dosman	Mini-series; episodes 1 & 3–5
2025	A Cruel Love: The Ruth Ellis Story	DCI Davies	Mini-series; episodes 1–4

=== Theatre ===
Year	Play	Playwright	Role	Theatre	Notes
1998	Dancing at Lughnasa	Brian Friel	Gerry Evans	George Square Theatre, Edinburgh; Arts Theatre, London	National Youth Theatre
2000	They Shoot Horses, Don't They?	Ray Herman	Lieutenant Stedna	Apollo Theatre, London	National Youth Theatre
2003	Protection	Fin Kennedy	Adam; Jeff	Soho Theatre, London	
2004	How Love Is Spelt	Chloe Moss	Joe	Bush Theatre, London	
2005	A Night at the Dogs	Matt Charman	Danny	Soho Theatre, London	
2009	Orphans	Dennis Kelly	Liam	Traverse Theatre, Edinburgh; Birmingham Repertory Theatre; Soho Theatre, London	Nominated: Stage Award for Best Actor
2010	The Empire	DC Moore	Gary	Jerwood Theatre Upstairs, London; Drum Theatre, Plymouth	
2011	Flare Path	Terence Rattigan	Sergeant Dusty Miller	Theatre Royal Haymarket, London	
2012	Miss Julie	August Strindberg	Jean	Royal Exchange Theatre, Manchester	
2013	The Dumb Waiter	Harold Pinter	Gus	The Print Room, London	Nominated: Offie for Best Male Performance
2015	Constellations	Nick Payne	Roland	Touring production	
2015	Husbands & Sons	D H Lawrence	Luther Gascoigne	Co-production between National Theatre, London and Royal Exchange, Manchester	
2019	Rutherford and Son	Githa Sowerby	Martin	National Theatre, London	
2024	London Tide	Ben Power	Roger Riderhood	National Theatre, London	
