= List of Robin Hood (2006 TV series) episodes =

The following is a list of episodes for the 2006 Tiger Aspect Productions television series Robin Hood. The first series ran from 7 October – 30 December 2006, the second series from 6 October – 29 December 2007 and the third from 28 March – 27 June 2009.

== Series overview ==
Series	Episodes	Originally released	
Series	Episodes	First released	Last released
1	13	7 October 2006	30 December 2006
2	13	6 October 2007	29 December 2007
3	13	28 March 2009	27 June 2009

== Episodes ==
=== Series 1 (2006) ===
No. overall	No. in series	Title	Directed by	Written by	Original release date
1	1	"Will You Tolerate This?"	John McKay	Dominic Minghella	7 October 2006
Robin returns home from The Crusades and discovers the oppression of the new Sheriff of Nottingham. He sees Marian again, to whom he had been betrothed before he chose to leave for the Crusades. First appearances of Allan A Dale, Robin Hood, Much, Will Scarlett, Guy of Gisborne, Edward, Marian, the Sheriff of Nottingham, Roy and Little John
2	2	"Sheriff Got Your Tongue?"	John McKay	Dominic Minghella	14 October 2006
While the Sheriff and Guy of Gisborne take control of Locksley, Robin, Much, Allan and Will encounter Little John and his gang of outlaws in the forest.
3	3	"Who Shot the Sheriff?"	Richard Standeven	Paul Cornell	21 October 2006
With the people of Nottingham being attacked by a mysterious archer, Robin finds himself blamed and the Sheriff uses this to turn the public against the outlaws.
4	4	"Parent Hood"	Richard Standeven	Mark Wadlow	28 October 2006
During an ambush against Guy of Gisborne, Robin Hood and the outlaws discover a baby boy abandoned in the forest. During the fight with the outlaws Gisborne's men capture Roy and drag him back to Nottingham Castle. While in a cell, Roy discovers that Gisborne fathered a child with Annie, a kitchen-girl, and that he'd lied to the mother and abandoned the child in the forest. Later, Roy is brought before the Sheriff of Nottingham and given an ultimatum: kill Robin Hood, or watch his own mother hang. Robin and the outlaws head to the castle to save Roy, only to find him riding away, supposedly having escaped. In order to lure Robin away from the others, Roy fabricates a story about the baby's mother living in Knighton. Meanwhile, Marian attempts to deliver food to a village that the Sheriff has quarantined. The guards stop her and she is only saved from reprisals by Robin and Roy's timely intervention. Robin is shot in the arm with an arrow while feeding the villagers, but he and Roy escape and are then joined by the rest of the outlaws. Later, Robin and the outlaws are given shelter in a villager's home. Marian tends to Robin's arrow wound and they discuss why he returned from the Holy Land: while defending the King against assassins, Robin was badly wounded, and by the time he'd healed the King had moved on and released Robin from service. After Robin leaves, the Sheriff orders Marian to be punished for feeding the villagers by having her hair cut on the public gallows. That night, while everyone sleeps, Roy tries to kill Robin but is foiled by Much and the others. He confesses that his mother is in danger, and Robin comes up with a plan to save her. The next day, before Roy's mother's scheduled hanging, the outlaws sneak into the castle. Allan-a-Dale finds Annie the kitchen-girl and tells her about the baby, while the others break into the dungeons to rescue Roy's mother. The Sheriff captures them and brings them to the hanging, but the proceedings are interrupted when Annie attacks Gisborne for abandoning their baby. The outlaws break free of their captors and save Roy's mother, and in the attempt Roy gives his life so that the others can escape, screaming aloud his loyalty to Robin and King Richard as the guards stab him to death. Marian helps Annie and her baby to leave Nottingham and start a new life. Last appearance of Roy
5	5	"Turk Flu"	Declan O'Dwyer	Debbie Oates	4 November 2006
The Sheriff holds an archery competition with a silver arrow as the prize in hope of finding Robin, but the outlaws have other plans. They ambush a slave trader who is selling Saracens to the Sheriff's mine and smuggle Allan A Dale into the cage. Allan scares the guards with a rumour of a disease, allowing Robin and the others to set the mine on fire. Before they can do this however, Little John falls into the mine. Meanwhile, in Nottingham, the slave trader arrives and informs the Sheriff of the outlaws' attack on the mine. The Sheriff and Gisborne rush to the mine, but are too late as one of the slaves, Djaq, has rescued John and the outlaws have burnt the mine. A man attempts to kill Marian to get revenge on Gisborne for killing his father, but Marian convinces him to instead win the silver arrow, melt it down into coins, and use it to feed his family. With Robin's help, he does so. After all this Djaq decides to join the outlaws. First appearance of Djaq
6	6	"The Taxman Cometh"	Richard Standeven	Richard Kurti and Bev Doyle	11 November 2006
When finding a man who appears to be the tax-man, Robin and his group break into Nottingham Castle to steal the mountain of Tax silver and give it back to the poor. However, they are tricked and end up locked in a room with no money in it. The sheriff rewards the tax collector for this. Marian argues with her father; reluctant to marry Sir Guy, she goes to the castle to meet a mother superior, the Abbess of Rufford, there in an attempt to become a nun. The mother superior is being held in the castle's chapel by the Sheriff, where the Sheriff is keeping the tax silver secure. Robin and his men manage to escape, whilst the tax-collector and Mother Superior (in fact a team of con artists) steal the silver from the chapel. The sheriff discovers his loss of the treasure too late. Meanwhile, Robin and his band capture the con artists in the woods on their way to Holland. The duo offer to take Robin along with them if they are allowed to pass through and live the high life. However, the outlaws refuse, relieve them of the treasure, and push them into the sewage.
7	7	"Brothers in Arms"	Declan O'Dwyer	Joe Turner	18 November 2006
A family reunion between Allan and his brother Tom turns sour when Tom and his crooked friends tag along. Meanwhile, a young couple turn up at Nottingham, asking Sir Guy of Gisbourne to marry them. Gisbourne takes a small necklace off the girl, the only thing of value she has. He then gives it as a gift to Marian, who gives it to Robin to return to the girl. When Gisbourne sees it around the girl's neck again, he suspects that Marian is in league with Robin, and gives it to a local conman named Lucky George, saying that it no longer means anything to him. The Sheriff suspects a spy in the castle is betraying his plans to Robin Hood and orders Gisbourne to set a trap. Gisbourne mistakenly suspects his own sergeant, who dies under torture. The actual culprit is Marian. Eventually Tom and his gang are taken by the Sheriff's men and hanged. In a cruel twist, the Sheriff advances the hanging by an hour, so that by the time Robin and the gang arrive for the rescue they are already too late, and Robin, finding out that Gisborne knows Marian gave the necklace back, goes to get it from Lucky George to find that he does not have it; however, among Tom's possessions is the necklace, which they stole back. While Robin eventually returns the necklace to Marian just in time for her to "prove" her innocence, Marian is forced to promise Sir Guy that—in order to protect herself and her father from the Sheriff—she will marry him the day King Richard returns from his crusade. A devastated Robin listens just outside Marian's upstairs window.
8	8	"Tattoo? What Tattoo?"	Matthew Evans	Julian Mitchell	25 November 2006
The episode begins with Robin having a nightmare about attacking a man with a tattoo oh his arm. The outlaws then humiliate Guy of Gisborne and his guests at a feast to celebrate King Richard's birthday by stealing their valuables, including an engagement ring he intended for Marian. Gisborne attempts to stop them and Robin pins him to a wall with a dagger, ripping open his sleeve and revealing a tattoo identical to the assassin's, complete with scar. The Sheriff arrives and the outlaws escape, but inadvertently leave Djaq behind, where she is captured by the Sheriff. Despite Marian's pleas otherwise, Gisborne goes in pursuit of Robin and the stolen ring. Despite his vow not to kill, Robin knocks Gisborne down and prepares to cut his throat, but the other outlaws arrive and stop him. He then tries to convince them that Gisborne is a traitor and should be executed, but the outlaws point out there's been no fair trial such as what Robin has always claimed to champion. At the castle, Djaq manages to escape her cell by using some kind of acid to weaken the bars, but is quickly recaptured. The Sheriff hires her as his new alchemist and locks her in his former alchemist's laboratory. Robin begins beating the bound Gisborne, but is pulled off and knocked unconscious by Little John. Leaving both Robin and Gisborne tied up and guarded by Much, the remaining outlaws sneak into the castle to try to rescue Djaq. She has used her alchemical skills to escape the laboratory, but is unable to escape with them and is once again recaptured. Gisborne responds to Robin's threats by mocking Robin about his 'shortage of friends' and points out that Robin is actually essentially a violent man. Robin unties him and the two men have a fistfight, with Gisborne taunting Robin about winning Marian and living in Robin's old house. At this, Robin knocks Gisbourne unconscious, but then falls back himself. Much returns with Marian and the rest of the outlaws. They get Robin back under control with Marian's help and try in vain to persuade him to exchange Gisborne for Djaq. Despite Robin's objections, the outlaws decide to go through with the exchange. The outlaws arrive with a bound Gisborne, and are soon joined by Robin, who has apparently either guessed or managed to persuade Much to tell him the location. As the prisoners are exchanged, Robin says he didn't agree to this, but has since had a change of heart. He then shouts that he will get justice on Gisborne when Richard returns, and that all he will need to do is show him Gisborne's tattoo. The Sheriff burns off the tattoo with the confiscated acid.
9	9	"A Thing or Two About Loyalty"	Graeme Harper	Paul Cornell	2 December 2006
Lambert, a scientist, has invented a highly explosive powder known as "Greek fire", which the Sheriff wants to exploit. The Sheriff orders Lambert to be thrown into the castle dungeons until he agrees to share his project ledger. It is decided that Much will get himself thrown into the castle dungeons so he can free Lambert. Much stands in the marketplace shouting insulting remarks about Prince John and the Sheriff. He is arrested after attacking one of the Sheriff's guards. Much is dragged in front of the Sheriff before he can help Lambert. The Sheriff, recognising Much as Robin's right-hand man, appoints him as the Earl of Bonchurch. He also assigns a girl named Eve to the task of spying on Much and reporting back to the Sheriff. Robin breaks into the dungeons and asks Lambert to reveal where the ledger is. Lambert says the ledger is hidden in a water barrel outside the castle and Robin goes off to retrieve it. The Sheriff finds out that Robin knows the whereabouts of the ledger. When Gisborne returns to the castle, the Sheriff tells him about this act of "betrayal". That night, Lambert is tortured to death. Robin visits Much at his new estate and asks him to find out where the Sheriff's three barrels of Greek Fire are hidden. Marian tells Robin that Lambert is dead, and cries on his shoulder. Much is getting along very well with the servant girl Eve, who is suspected of spying on him under the Sheriff's orders. On seeing this, Marian takes him aside and asks him to tell Eve that the ledger is located in a powder barrel. Much agrees, but unknown to him, Eve has been listening at the door. Eve promises to lie to the Sheriff about the ledger's location, and helps Much to escape back into the forest. Before he leaves, he kisses her and swears to return and find her when the Sheriff is gone and justice restored. Eve tells the Sheriff that the ledger is hidden inside one of the barrels of Greek fire. Gisbourne's men are sent to look for it, and are unknowingly followed by Robin. When Gisbourne returns empty-handed, the Sheriff realises that Eve led them into a trap and immediately rides to the mountain with Gisbourne. Unfortunately for the Sheriff and Gisbourne, Robin is waiting for him, and blows up the powder with a well-placed Fire Arrow. Gisbourne is seconds from death when the cave blows up, and only just survives. A furious Sheriff orders Gisbourne to "clean up [his] mess".
10	10	"Peace? Off!"	Graeme Harper	Richard Kurti and Bev Doyle	9 December 2006
A madman is terrorising villagers by setting fire to churches and poisoning wells. Robin rescues the man and takes him to the forest. He has strange, unusual Saracen symbols tattooed on his chest. The Sheriff has a guest, a Middle Eastern prince who is here to broker peace, and awaiting Prince John at Nottingham Castle. In the forest, Will has found the prince's wagon, which contains directions to the castle and also a strange mask, which they think is used to perform dark magic. When the madman, named Harold, sees the Saracen mask, he attacks Djaq with a knife and is close to slicing her throat. After that they keep him locked up in a cage. The Sheriff lets it be known to Gisborne that he is actually holding Prince Malik as a hostage, and has demanded a ransom from Saladin. The ransom is carried through the forest by four exotic Saracen women and their male leader. Djaq explains that the women are Saladin's finest assassins: the group are dubious about her claim, but take it more seriously when they see the lethal skills of the warrior women. The group originally assume the warriors have come to rescue Malik, but they then realise Saladin has dispatched the assassins to kill him. Harold tells the gang that it was these women who tattooed their marks on him and drove him mad. Robin and his men go to the castle to rescue Prince Malik. The assassins are about to kill Prince Malik when Robin, his men and the Sheriff engage in battle with the assassins: however, the lethal skills of the warrior women prove too much for the outlaws, and Robin and the gang are on the brink of defeat. Suddenly, Harold comes charging to their rescue and cuts the warrior women down. Malik and Harold leave together to travel back to the Holy Land, Malik promising to carry Robin's tale along with his message of peace to the Saracens.
11	11	"Dead Man Walking"	Graeme Harper	Simon Ashford	16 December 2006
Guy of Gisbourne is out in Locksley demanding money with menace and a harder line than ever before. Guy discovers Luke the Cooper was working for Robin Hood. Luke is taken prisoner, as is Little John's son (also named John) who tries to protect him. Robin and Little John witness this. In dismay that his son has been arrested, John strikes out on his own to rescue the pair, only to be captured and taken to the dungeons himself. During the fight, he loses his two tags which identify him as one of Robin Hood's men. Robin and Alan-a-Dale disguise themselves as castle guards and take Will as a pretend prisoner to gain access to the dungeons and Little John. However, their plan is thwarted when they discover the dungeons are full and Will has to be left outside. Little John, however, has met and befriended Luke and John. Alice, his wife, is later thrown into the dungeons too and Little John reveals he is the father of John. Marian tells Robin that the tax money is leaving for London, with Guy of Gisborne guarding it. Robin plans to exchange the money for sacks of grain. Gisbourne leaves with the cart, only to discover the switch soon after leaving the castle gates. Meanwhile the Sheriff has plans for all the prisoners who have not paid their taxes - they are to be a deterrent to other non-payers in his 'Festival of Pain'. He plans to torture the prisoners in front of important local nobles, but Robin comes in just as he is about to begin. They escape, leaving the Sheriff upside-down in one of his torture machines.
12	12	"The Return of the King"	Matthew Evans	Dominic Minghella	23 December 2006
The King is returning from the Holy Land, and Guy is planning to hold Marian to her promise for her hand in marriage. Robin, determined more than ever to find evidence of Gisborne's treason. Robin learns that Gisbourne was actually in the Holy Land, trying to kill the King. Meanwhile, Gisborne shows Marian his stately wealth. That night, Robin attempts to visit Marian again, but she is nowhere to be found and he realises what has happened - she has gone to steal Gisborne's gold. Marian is at the manor when Gisborne realises what is going on and corners her behind the door of the room she is in. Just as he is breaking down the door with an axe, Robin and the band arrive and hold Gisborne and his men to arrowpoint whilst Marian makes good her escape but Gisborne manages to stab Marian in the belly as she leaves, something Robin does not realise until he is prepared to depart. Meanwhile, Will and Alan-a-Dale, having got away with a large amount of gold, decide to treat it as 'severance pay' and leave Robin. Robin takes Marian to the cave where the men have been hiding out, and Marian and Robin at last share their true feelings. Djaq does her best to operate but in the morning, she finds that Marian's body is 'shutting down'. Finally Djaq announces that Marian needs a proper physician. Robin runs to get a doctor, who leaves a trail of bandages for the guards to follow. The doctor declares that Marian is dead. Robin grieves over Marian's body.
13	13	"A Clue: No"	Matthew Evans	Dominic Minghella	30 December 2006
Having recovered from her wounds received in the previous episode, Marian comes very close to following through on her halfhearted promise to marry Guy of Gisborne, but after Much breaks into the wedding to protest, Marian punches Gisborne at the altar and escapes with Robin instead. While this is occurring, Sheriff Vaisey has hired an impostor of King Richard and stages a mock trial of himself to weed out disloyal nobles, almost resulting in the death of Marian's father. This plan is barely thwarted by Robin's band after Much recognizes the king as a fraud.

=== Series 2 (2007) ===
No. overall	No. in series	Title	Directed by	Written by	Original release date
14	1	"Sisterhood"	Ciaran Donnelly	Dominic Minghella	6 October 2007
The episode opens with Robin, apparently dead after being shot in the eye, being robbed by a group of nobles heading to Nottingham castle under the leadership of a mysterious blonde woman. She orders her men to get rid of the body, but Robin suddenly opens his eyes, removes the arrow and reveals an ambush. The rest of his gang appear and demand money to feed the poor, but the nobles fight back and Robin's gang retreats. The nobles continue on their way to Nottingham Castle, where the Sheriff welcomes the blonde and it is revealed that she is his sister, Davina. Marian, along with Allan and Edward, are kidnapped by Guy, who burns down Knighton hall and takes them to the castle as hostages. When Robin arrives at the castle, he is prepared to shoot Guy but Marian stops him. At the castle, Guy and Marian talk briefly of their unsuccessful wedding, as Guy reminds her she can't embarrass a man of his power at the altar without consequences. Robin meets a woman called Rose, actually the Sheriff's sister in disguise, tied to a stake in Nottingham market place, taking a punishment for her "children", who are actually actors. In attempting to save them, Robin is trapped and the deception is revealed. Robin is hung above a pit of snakes and hears the Sheriff and a group of black-cloaked figures discussing "Operation Shah Mat" (a.k.a. Checkmate), a plan to kill King Richard upon his return to English soil. The Sheriff has Robin lowered inch by inch into the pit, until Marian, as the Night Watchman, causes a distraction. Left alone, Robin escapes from the pit, but is stopped by Davina. In the struggle, Davina ends up in the pit and Robin and the sheriff, who has returned, try to save her. They get her out, but she has been fatally bitten and dies in her brother's arms. The Sheriff vows revenge on Robin. Robin returns to his band, as does Allan, who has been released by Guy on the condition he will be his spy in Robin's camp.
15	2	"The Booby and the Beast"	Ciaran Donnelly	Simon Ashford	13 October 2007
In Robin's first adventure after discovering the horrible truth about operation Shah Mat, Robin decides to break into the Sheriff of Nottingham's Strong Room. Robin realizes he has underestimated the Strong Room's array of deathly traps and decides to think up an entirely new plan. He decides to track down the Strong Room's designers: unfortunately, Gisborne has killed most of them to ensure their silence. Robin finds the sole survivor: the now blind designer called Stephen and together, Stephen, Robin and his gang practise fighting the room's deadly traps. Back in Nottingham Castle, the Sheriff orders Marian to pander to every whim of Count Frederick (Dexter Fletcher), who has arrived to play at the casino. Frederick then finds out that the Sheriff has a plan that will ensure he loses. Marian then gains a vital ally. He then helps Robin think up a plan to break into the Strong Room. In order to increase the Sheriff's losses Frederick agrees to lose all his winnings to the Sheriff after a signal from Djaq, working undercover; however, the double-agent Allan has told Gisborne about Robin's plans and Gisborne doubles the traps in place. Robin gets out, sending the Sheriff into a rage; back in Sherwood Forest, Frederick gives Robin another full chest of riches to feed the needy.
16	3	"Childhood"	Ciaran Donnelly	Jason Sutton	20 October 2007
A group of boys are captured after accidentally stumbling on Gisborne's weapons-testing site. One, Daniel, manages to escape and runs to Robin to raise the alarm. Daniel tells Robin that Gisborne has been working on an indestructible suit of armor made of Damascus steel. Gisborne takes the boys back to Locksley Manor where the Sheriff orders that they be hanged. Robin and his gang arrive to save the boys and steal the black diamonds used to create the Damascus steel. They are successful, but Daniel is captured during the scramble. The Sheriff demands an exchange: Daniel for the black diamond. The gang agrees that they will hand over the diamond in a box lined with pitch, then set light to the diamond's box with a flaming arrow and melt the rocks. Marian learns of Daniel's capture devises and her own plan. She requests a night pass from the Sheriff and slips in a second paper—a release for Daniel—which is also affixed with the Sheriff's seal. Marian needs one of the outlaws to pose as a guard and take Daniel. Allan volunteers and plans to leak Robin's plan to Gisborne. Allan intentionally fails to rescue Daniel and also leaks Robin's plan to Gisborne. Robin and the Sheriff meet for the exchange. Robin hands over the box and the Sheriff removes the rocks and places them into a satchel. He then tells a concealed Gisborne that Robin is all his. Gisborne emerges in his indestructible armor. Dodging his attacks, Robin sets Gisborne's armor on fire, then holds him at sword point as he offers the Sheriff another deal: Gisborne's life for the black diamonds. The Sheriff throws the rocks to Robin, who destroys them in the fire. The episode ends with Robin giving the four boys the wooden tags that signify that they are part of Robin Hood's gang. They all call out: "We Are Robin Hood."
17	4	"The Angel of Death"	Matthew Evans	Julian Unthank	27 October 2007
The Sheriff and his sinister scientist, Joseph (Ralf Little), are testing a chemical weapon on a street in Nottingham Town and blaming the ill effects on the pestilence, but Dan Scarlett, who is in town to visit his son, Will, knows it is not the pestilence at all. Dan wants Will to become his apprentice and run the family's carpentry business. Will is frustrated that his father is blind to the good work he does as an outlaw. The men bicker about what is best for Will. Dan speaks out against the Sheriff, because he knows it is poison and not the pestilence. The Sheriff murders Dan for spreading the truth, leaving Will and his younger brother, Luke, heartbroken. Robin realizes that the Sheriff is up to something and resolves to track down the source of the poison. The outlaws work tirelessly to soothe the sick, assisted by none other than Joseph, who is recording the results of his "experiment." Little John discovers a cure for the poison, an old woodman's remedy. With the sick on the mend, the outlaws head to the castle to find Will has poisoned the Sheriff and Joseph as revenge for killing his father. After making the Sheriff apologize to Nottingham for trying to poison them, Robin convinces Will to use the antidote on the Sheriff. Angry that there is a cure to his poison, Joseph lunges at Robin, then falls to his death out of a window of the castle. Robin and the outlaws return through the town to the cheers of Nottingham. In the forest, Will makes a monument in memory of his father using stones placed so that when the sun shines on them, Dan's face is seen smiling.
18	5	"Ducking and Diving"	Matthew Evans	Debbie Oates	3 November 2007
A horrified Robin realizes that his plan to capture the Sheriff's spy, Henry of Lewes, has failed because he has a traitor in his gang. Fearing for Marian's safety in the castle, Robin sets about rooting out the turncoat. His only clue is supplied by Marian: the spy's meeting place is the Trip To Jerusalem Inn, where the traitor outlaw sells his secrets to Gisborne. With two missions to complete Robin is relieved when Henry of Lewes arrives at the castle unconscious, his vital information about the King's landing sites remaining a mystery. Robin infiltrates the castle to silence Henry, but help arrives in the shape of wise-woman Matilda, who has known Robin since he was a baby, who has been tasked by the Sheriff to nurse Henry to health. Asking Robin to look after her heavily pregnant daughter, Rosa, Matilda promises that she'll silence Henry using special herbs, but doesn't bargain upon the Sheriff making the connection with Robin Hood and putting her life in mortal peril. Robin returns to the forest with Matilda's daughter, to a confused and hurt gang: they resent being suspected of treachery and it takes all of Robin's leadership skills to rally his outlaws into helping Rosa. Then Marian arrives reporting that Matilda is about to be tried for witchcraft. The race is on to rescue her before she is drowned. Robin hits Will and chases him away as a decoy, and then goes to the inn, where he finally finds the real traitor, Allan. Although he doesn't kill Allan, Robin does banish him from the gang.
19	6	"For England...!"	James Erskine	Rob Heyland	10 November 2007
Sir Guy buys Marian several pretty silk dresses and they argue over which one she should wear. She decides on blue. The sheriff is gathering the Black Knights together to sign a pact to kill King Richard and put Prince John on the throne. Meanwhile, the traitorous Allan breaks into Locksley Manor and gets a job from Gisborne. Robin tries desperately—and fails—to stop the signing of the pact and kill the men involved. When the traitorous Lord Winchester claims Marian as payment for his signature on the pact, a horrified Sir Guy comes to her rescue, stabbing the old man in the gut and thus killing him. Sir Guy whisks Marian back to Nottingham Castle on his horse, while Robin watches dejectedly from the bushes, having arrived seconds too late to rescue her himself.
20	7	"Show Me the Money"	James Erskine	Julian Jones	17 November 2007
Robin is determined to get hold of the Great Pact of Nottingham, written proof of the Sheriff's treason, so when lovelorn Knight, John of York passes by Robin and the gang, begging them to take pity on him and save his girl, Robin formulates a plan that will kill two birds with one stone. The Knight is sent off not only with his own money, but also some of the money that Robin's men recently took. Robin intends to rob everything back once it reaches the castle, by using York's silver to locate where the Sheriff's treasure - including the Pact - is hidden. Whilst Marian tends to Edward in the dungeons, she overhears Allan giving all of the outlaws' secret entrances and escape routes away. Robin goes to Nottingham Castle to silence Allan, but Marian sees them and begs Robin not to kill him if he loves her. He finally admits his love for her and lets Allan go. Meanwhile, Edward escapes the dungeon and rushes to the Sheriff's quarters to get the Pact from his bedroom safe. Robin comes in, also to get the Pact. The Sheriff wakes up and chases Robin out of the room. Edward and Robin meet up with the gang. As Edward and the gang flee, the Canon of Birkley steps in their path and threatens to kill Robin unless he hands over the Pact. Stepping in to defend Robin, Edward is stabbed. When Marian sees her father's body, Gisbourne tries to comfort her in her distress, telling her that his feelings for her are stronger than ever, then moves to kiss her but she turns away. She rushes into her room where Robin waits. She collapses to the floor and Robin rushes to console her. He asks her to come and live in the forest with him and she finally accepts. They climb out of a window, and ride off together on a horse. Last appearance of Edward
21	8	"Get Carter!"	Roger Goldby	Richard Stoneman	24 November 2007
Carter is an assassin hired by the Sheriff of Nottingham to retrieve the Pact of Nottingham. Carter sets out in pursuit of Robin and his men. The Sheriff sends out several guards to ransack the nearby town of Clun, hoping to draw Robin to the scene, where Carter will be waiting. As Robin's gang fights the guards, Carter arrives and kills a number of the guards, saving Robin and the village. Oblivious that Carter has been hired by the Sheriff to kill him, Robin takes a "wounded" Carter back to the camp. In Robin's absence, Carter takes all of Robin's gang hostage before Robin realizes. Robin defeats Carter and learns that he holds Robin responsible for his brother's death in the Holy Land. After being told the painful truth of the incident (that his brother was a glory-hungry fool), he offers to help Robin. Djaq uses a potion to reduce Robin's breathing to a minimum, making him appear dead. At the castle gate, Guy comes out to see Robin's body. To make sure he is really dead, he draws his sword to slit Robin's neck. Just as the blow is about to be dealt, Marian bursts through the crowd. Marian tells Guy that she needs time alone to grieve her father's death. He doesn't believe her. Marian spots Much and Will running down the hall and distracts Guy by pulling him into a passionate kiss. As the Sheriff is making plans for Robin's dead body, Carter brings him back to life. Robin and Carter take the reward money and run from the room. Back at camp, the gang sees Carter off. Robin and Marian agree a truce from their bickering, and they are shown clasping hands as Carter rides away into the distance, heading for the Holy Land to help King Richard, and warn him what is going on back in England.
22	9	"Lardner's Ring"	Roger Goldby	John Fay	1 December 2007
A wounded messenger from King Richard flees Locksley Manor, pursued by Allan and Gisbourne's men. He manages to hide a message up a tree before suffering a bad fall. Robin and Marian arrive and drive off Allan and his men. With his dying breath, the messenger tells Robin that the King needs him to recruit more men to fight in the Holy Land and utters the word "Lardner." Robin asks Marian if she will marry him. Marian agrees, and they form a plan. The Sheriff is furious at a fool whom Gisborne had hired to entertain his guests. It is revealed that the fool had revealed to the messenger that Gisborne was the new lord of Locksley and that Robin was an outlaw. Djaq tells Robin that "Lardner" might be a Saracen carrier pigeon and Robin's message of reply will take only days to get back to King Richard. Whilst the gang sets about composing a message to the King, Robin and Marian ride off to the last place they had seen saw the King's messenger, a tree. Just as they reach Lardner, the Sheriff and Gisborne arrive. The Sheriff goes back to the castle, saying, "I have an idea." Meanwhile, Marian insists that Robin act as if she was a hostage. He lowers a bound and gagged Marian from a tree on a rope, threatening to kill her. Robin gets a clear route of escape from the tree, but Marian decides to return with Gisbourne. As the outlaws escape, Will releases the pigeon. The Sheriff unleashes a hawk, which quickly dispatches the small pigeon. Will reveals that the pigeon that was killed had been a decoy, a spare prop bird provided by the fool. Lardner is given this message: "Prince John plots to steal your throne. Make peace--" these two words inserted by Djaq "--and come home immediately."
23	10	"Walkabout"	Matthew Evans	Richard Kurti and Bev Doyle	8 December 2007
Tormented by Robin, the Sheriff finds himself sleepwalking straight into Sherwood Forest. By the time Gisborne raises the alarm, Prince John's private army is already on its way, ready to raze Nottingham to the ground at sunset. Gisborne and Marian secretly task Robin with tracking down the Sheriff in the forest. The Sheriff, meanwhile, is getting to grips with nature, and embarks on a journey of rediscovery. Little John is fooled by the Sheriff's poor-man act and brings his enemy right into the heart of the camp. At the castle, Allan finds Will and tries to apologize for his mistakes and asks if he could return to the gang, but Will tells him it's too late. Later, as the towns people arm themselves, Allan tries again to speak to Will and this time Will accepts his apology. Due to Gisborne's status as a Black Knight, he is free to flee the town with any family he may have. Jasper says that Marian can be spared as well - if Guy has married her before sundown. Marian explains that she cannot bring herself to abandon Nottingham, marriage or not. Guy decides to risk his life and stay with her in the castle, saying that if he is going to die, he is going to die at her side. As Prince John's army looms on the horizon, Marian, Gisborne, Will and Allan prepare to fight for their lives alongside the people of Nottingham. Robin comes to the rescue by capturing the Sheriff before he can leave the camp with The Great Pact. Getting him back to the castle just in time, the Sheriff angrily berates an astounded Jasper and sends the army away. He is giddy when he tells Gisborne that he has singlehandedly infiltrated Hood's camp and has retrieved The Pact - only to furiously discover that Robin has stolen the Pact back during the return to Nottingham.
24	11	"Treasure of the Nation"	Matthew Evans	Simon J. Ashford	15 December 2007
Robin and the outlaws meet the fearsome Legrand who brings a vital message from King Richard. It turns out to be a clue leading to the "thesaurus patriae" (treasure of the nation), which must be found in two days time. Legrand informs Robin that the other half to the clue is held by a war merchant named Paxton. While they puzzle over what the clues mean, Marian arrives to inform Robin that Locksley has been turned into a garrison. Marian asks Robin to help the people of Locksley, but Robin refuses. In Locksley, Marian is unmasked by Gisbourne, who swears she will die as punishment for her treachery. Marian begs Allan for help but he refuses. Marian is then taken to the castle to await execution. The clues lead the outlaws to a cave in the forest. The Sheriff arrives and seals the cave, trapping the outlaws inside. John manages to lift the stone slab, allowing the gang to escape. Robin realizes the map actually leads to a church, where they find the treasure is Queen Eleanor of Aquitaine, mother of King Richard. The Sheriff attacks and the gang and Queen Eleanor escape through a trapdoor. Legrand is fatally stabbed by the Sheriff whilst trying to defend the Queen. As Marian enters the courtyard, calmly prepared to die, somebody appears on the battlements dressed as the Nightwatchman. The imposter flees and reveals himself to be Allan. Guy goes to speak to Marian in her room. Guy tells her that she was the only thing that made life in the castle bearable, and that he planned to burn the Nightwatchman costume to get rid of the once and for all. Marian thanks them and hugs them both. To return the favor, Guy asks Marian to stay in the castle. She accepts, and all is well.
25	12	"A Good Day to Die"	David Evans	Dominic Minghella	29 December 2007
Much has arranged a birthday surprise for Robin at a barn that is interrupted by mercenaries led by Ellingham. The outlaws realize that the mercenaries will not leave until the outlaws emerge. Guy tells Marian that he is going away and Marian is suspicious that he and the Sheriff are heading for the Holy Land. She tries to find Robin at the camp to warn him, but he is not there. She attempts to kill the Sheriff with Allan's sword, but she is overpowered by him. Gisbourne is forced to reveal that he knew that Marian was the Nightwatchman. The Sheriff, furious, tells her that Robin Hood and his friends will soon be dead. Back at the barn, Will and Djaq confess their love for each other, Little John speaks about his family and Much confesses that he feels unappreciated and misses the days when he and Robin were like brothers. Robin talks of his love for Marian. The Sheriff and Gisbourne head for the Holy Land with Marian as their prisoner. Allan goes to warn the gang of the Sheriff's plans. As the outlaws prepare to face the mercenaries, Will and Djaq share a kiss. Allan shows up and convinces Ellingham that the Sheriff has sent him to collect the prisoners to be interrogated. Halfway through the scheme, Ellingham learns that he's been hoodwinked and the outlaws are forced to fight for their lives. As the outlaws manage to fight their way free, Allan informs Robin of the Sheriff and Gisborne's plan, and that they have a captive Marian with them. Robin and his gang, including Allan, set off for the Holy Land in order to save Marian and ultimately England.
26	13	"We Are Robin Hood!"	David Evans	Dominic Minghella	29 December 2007
The Sheriff, Gisborne and Marian arrive in the Holy Land to put the deadly Shah Mat operation into action. The Sheriff and Gisborne meet their Saracen allies: a mercenary thug, Karim, and a twisted schemer, Nasir, who is to masquerade as Saladin’s messenger and convince King Richard that Saladin wants peace. Robin and the outlaws arrive and run into Carter, from the episode "Get Carter". Robin discovers the whereabouts of the King and sets off to find his old friend and hero. However, the King believes that Robin intends to take his life. Richard doesn't execute the outlaws but instead ties them up in the desert. The King then leaves for a peace talk with Saladin. The Sheriff turns up with a captive Marian and a Black Knight spy in the King's camp. They tie Marian up to Robin and leave to kill the King. Fearing this may be their last chance, Robin and Marian begin to exchange wedding vows before Carter appears on the horizon to rescue them. The deadly meeting between the King and Saladin takes place. Karim, posing as Saladin, reveals his true and treacherous identity and attacks. However, he doesn't bargain on meeting Robin, who has taken the King's place. Their cover blown, the Sheriff and his allies retreat to the town and a furious battle breaks out. In the chaos, King Richard saves Robin and Robin kills Nasir. The Sheriff fires an arrow into King Richard’s back which leaves Richard severely injured. The Sheriff is forced to flee when Carter pursues him, but he lures the King's bodyguard into a fatal ambush. An adamant Gisborne still wishes to escape to England and take Marian for his bride, by force if needed. His feelings are soon quashed when Marian refuses. Guy runs Marian through with his sword just as Robin and his men arrive. Using the King's ring for a wedding ring, Robin and Marian are married. After the vows Marian rips the sword from her body, and dies. After the burials of Carter and Marian, King Richard tells Robin of their next move and proclaims with his men, "We are Robin Hood!" Will and Djaq reveal that they have decided to stay in the Holy Land together. The four remaining outlaws then begin their way home, vowing to finish the Sheriff and Gisborne once and for all. Last appearance of Will and Djaq; last regular appearance of Marian

=== Series 3 (2009) ===
No. overall	No. in series	Title	Directed by	Written by	Original release date
27	1	"Total Eclipse"	Douglas Mackinnon	Michael Chaplin	28 March 2009
Robin, Little John, Much and Allan have followed Gisborne and the Sheriff back to England from the Holy Land. The 4 outlaws are themselves secretly pursued by a monk named Brother Tuck (David Harewood). In Locksley, Robin has an epic battle with Gisborne to avenge Marian's murder, with both determined to fight to the death. Gisborne gains the upper hand and throws Robin down a ravine. Tuck finds Robin barely alive, and revives him, believing he's the only man who can unite the people of England and destroy the tyrannical reign of the Sheriff, Gisborne and Prince John. But first, Tuck must convince a still grieving and disenchanted Robin that England is still worth fighting for. Meanwhile, the Sheriff learns Prince John will fire him for failing to kill King Richard - unless he pays a thousand crowns a month. Tuck joins Robin's gang. First appearance of Tuck
28	2	"Cause and Effect"	Douglas Mackinnon	Simon J. Ashford	4 April 2009
The Sheriff sells the local village men to Irish warriors who need new army recruits. In his attempt to free the conscripts, Robin himself is captured in the chaos. Kate (Joanne Froggatt), a village girl from Locksley, tries to help the outlaws to rescue her captured brother, but her heroics have devastating consequences. Meanwhile Gisborne's ineptitude has potentially fatal consequences when the Sheriff hands him over to Prince John's men. First appearance of Kate
29	3	"Lost in Translation"	Alex Pillai	Ryan Craig	11 April 2009
The Sheriff turns the heat up on Robin and his gang by forcing the Abbot of Kirklees to accuse the outlaws of stealing from the church. The Sheriff has discovered that the Abbot had secretly translated the Latin Bible into English – a practise banned by the Pope – and thus blackmails the Abbot for his own purposes. Tuck's attempt to clear Robin's name ends with him being captured and tied to the rack. It is now up to the gang to free Tuck in time, while escaping execution themselves. Gisborne is absent
30	4	"Sins of the Father"	Alex Pillai	Holly Phillips	18 April 2009
The vicious new tax collector Ruthless Rufus is in town, intent on revenge as his father was executed by the Sheriff. When he kidnaps Allan and Kate, Robin retaliates by snatching his son. Robin and the gang then face a race against time as they try to find Rufus' hiding place. Pitching in all their resources and skills, the gang plans to trade Edmund, Rufus' son, for Allan and Kate. Gisborne is absent
31	5	"Let the Games Commence"	Patrick Lau	Lisa Holdsworth	25 April 2009
Gisborne is back, and he is not alone; by his side are Prince John's Elite Guards and a mysterious weapon. This time, he is determined to catch and slay Robin Hood by any means necessary. As the outlaws run for their lives, Little John gets separated and ends up in a Gladiator circus. Meanwhile, Gisborne's estranged sister, Isabella (Lara Pulver) is rescued by Robin in Sherwood Forest, who is unaware of the siblings' relation. Gisborne returns and first appearance of Isabella
32	6	"Do You Love Me?"	Patrick Lau	Timothy Prager	2 May 2009
Prince John (Toby Stephens) pays a long-awaited visit to Nottingham, and he is out to make trouble, longing for the coveted title of King. Gisborne and the Sheriff are assigned a royal mission which surely spells the end for one of them. Meanwhile, Robin is forced to save a wounded Kate, and Locksley from destruction. First appearance of Prince John; temporary last appearance of Vaisey
33	7	"Too Hot to Handle"	John Greening	Chris Lang	9 May 2009
A heat wave hits Nottinghamshire and, when Prince John blocks all the local wells, the outlaws are forced to take desperate measures to save those at risk. Robin and Isabella's secret relationship is uncovered and Gisborne is ordered to dispose of them. Isabella proposes a life away from Nottinghamshire, prompting Robin to make a difficult choice about his future.
34	8	"The King Is Dead, Long Live the King…"	John Greening	John Jackson	23 May 2009
The Royal Keeper of the Keys and Robin's former mentor, Lord Sheridan announces that King Richard has been killed in battle. Prince John orders a hasty coronation at Nottingham and forces the Archbishop to preside over it. Can Robin unveil a hidden secret before John is crowned King? Meanwhile, Isabella tries to capture Guy. Last appearance of Prince John
35	9	"A Dangerous Deal"	Graeme Harper	Michael Chaplin	30 May 2009
Gisborne awaits his execution in Nottingham dungeon, and meets a fellow prisoner who has a profound effect upon him. Robin thinks he can strike a deal with Sheriff Isabella, but his plans are thwarted when an unexpected stranger from her past arrives, looking for revenge.
36	10	"Bad Blood"	Roger Goldby	Lisa Holdsworth	6 June 2009
A mysterious figure forces Robin and Gisborne to hear the story of their past. The truth about their parents is exposed and a huge revelation rocks them both to the core. As the strange figure shows his face, Robin and Gisborne know their lives will never be the same again. • One episode main character appearances: Malcolm, Roger, Ghislaine and Longthorn • Tuck, Little John, Much, Allan and Kate don’t appear • Isabella appears only as a young girl • Archer appears only as a newborn
37	11	"The Enemy of My Enemy"	Graeme Harper	Timothy Prager	13 June 2009
The gang are shocked when Robin announces that Gisborne is joining their fight against Isabella, but can their uneasy truce survive? The pair journey to York to save their long-lost half-brother, Archer, only to find he has made a formidable enemy in the Sheriff of York. First adult appearance of Archer
38	12	"Something Worth Fighting For"	Matthew Evans	Ryan Craig	20 June 2009
39	13	"Something Worth Fighting For"	Matthew Evans	Simon J. Ashford	27 June 2009
Isabella rounds up Locksley's men to send to Prince John, and the gang are forced to do everything they can to stop her… even taking Nottingham by force. Unfortunately, Isabella's machinations turn the gang against each other when they need unity most, and unknown to all, the previous Sheriff is back for his vengeance, and attacks the city with a vast and terrible army. Robin and the gang fight to defend the castle, but the Sheriff's army forces them to retreat. Meanwhile, Tuck sets up barrels of byzantine fire. Last appearances of Allan, Robin, Much, Kate, Gisborne, Marian, Tuck, Archer, Isabella, Sheriff Vaisey and Little John

== See also ==
- List of films and television series featuring Robin Hood
