= Sheriff Got Your Tongue? =

- Robin Hood episode
- Robin holding the Sheriff at arrowpoint
- Episode no.: Season 1 Episode 2
- Directed by: John McKay
- Written by: Dominic Minghella
- Production code: 102
- Original air date: 14 October 2006

Episode chronology
← Previous "Will You Tolerate This?"	Next → "Who Shot the Sheriff?"

"Sheriff Got Your Tongue?" is the second episode of the 2006 Robin Hood television series, made by Tiger Aspect Productions for BBC One. It aired on Saturday 14 October 2006 at 7.00pm. The title refers to an incident in the episode after Much mentions that the Sheriff had been cutting out tongues. Hanton, one of Little John's men, jokes that if someone were being quiet, they could then ask "Sheriff got your tongue?" instead of "cat got your tongue?".

== Plot ==
The Sheriff enters Locksley village offering a reward of £20 for the whereabouts of Robin. No one is prepared to speak and so the Sheriff declares that for every hour he is not told of Robin's whereabouts he will cut out a tongue.

Following the events of the previous episode, Robin, Much, and Allan (but not Will) have been captured and tied to trees in Sherwood Forest, forced to take off their outer garments whilst Little John and his gang members Roy, Forrest and Hanton rummage through their prisoners' belongings.

After Little John and his men leave, Will frees the others and Robin declares that they will take revenge. They follow Little John and his followers, then tie them up and retrieve their belongings. While Robin scorns them for how they treat their fellow men, robbing them when they should be trying to help overthrow the Sheriff, Little John's reinforcements arrive to tie up Robin and company once more. Little John is told of the reward on Robin's head and knocks him out.

Robin recovers where he finds Little John has carried him to Locksley. However, Little John's wife Alice is next to face the Sheriff's wrath. Robin convinces Little John to free him instead. Robin advances and shoots the shears in two with incredible accuracy, but is then forced to surrender. As Robin is hauled off to Nottingham Castle, both gangs believe him to be as good as dead, apart from Much. Robin is interrogated by the Sheriff, who calls him a coward for not taking the opportunity to kill him.

Much heads after Robin to save him, asking Marian and her father for help: Marian's father will speak for him in court, but they can't do anything else. After Much leaves, Marian receives a visit from Sir Guy of Gisborne, now Lord of Locksley, who states that as Robin is an outlaw he is to be treated as a prisoner of war and will not receive a trial. Meanwhile, Little John sees his son again (though he is unaware that it's his father), and hears his wife sing him a lullaby to sleep. Little John then orders both gangs to rescue Robin. Much comes first to Nottingham Castle, though due to a stray dog he is forced to sleep on a ladder until the rest of both gangs arrive.

Marian also stages her own rescue attempt, at first scolding him for leaving to fight in the Holy Land, to which Robin romantically asks what is she really talking about. The gangs arrive to rescue Robin whilst Marian distracts the guard with the unconscious jailer. However Robin takes a detour on his escape to see the Sheriff. Somehow, Roy got into the castle and disguised himself as a soldier. Robin threatens the Sheriff that if he dare touch another person to get to him he will kill him. Robin then forces the Sheriff by holding him at arrowpoint to apologise to every peasant by shouting from the window – during this time Robin escapes with the rest of his fellow outlaws. Robin takes both gangs around the village leaving parcels and money for their loved ones. In Sherwood Forest, Little John’s gang merges with Robin’s gang, with Robin as the altogether leader. Little John pretends to eat raw rabbit, and Much takes it seriously, which causes the outlaws to all laugh at Much.

=== Continuity ===
Forrest and Hanton appear to join Robin's gang at the end of the episode along with Little John and Roy, but do not appear in subsequent episodes.

== Reception ==
=== Reviews ===
In a preview of the episode for the website of The Stage newspaper the day before its transmission, reviewer Mark Wright felt that "Sheriff Got Your Tongue?" was an improvement on the programme's opening instalment, although he was critical of Armstrong's performance. "Even Marian doesn’t seem too impressed with Robin, saying: 'He’s an outlaw now, just not a very good one,' which is an unfortunate gift to pithy TV reviewers. Encouragingly this is much better than the first episode and is starting to feel a lot more like the silly, exciting adventure series it needs to be."

Other reviews were far more critical. Writing on the Guardian Unlimited website the Monday after transmission, The Guardian newspaper's media editor Matt Wells was particularly scathing about both the episode in particular and the series in general. "[T]hat's another 45 minutes of my life that I won't get back... Almost everything about this adaptation is wrong. The casting is ill-advised, the characterisation is poor, the script is laughable. Nothing is believable - there's no spark between Marian and Robin, there's no depth to the 'evil' of the Sheriff and you don't really care when one of his henchmen yanks out a villager's tongue."

Reviewer Dek Hogan of the Digital Spy media news website was similarly unimpressed by the episode. "This whole production has an air of unbelievability about it, from Robin’s ridiculously accurate shooting to Guy’s snarling poseur of a bad guy. As for Gordon 'Little John' Kennedy, he looked more comfortable hosting the National Lottery with Anthea Turner. I’m still perplexed as to how such a good writer can have made such a pig’s ear out of the silk purse of this legend. I’ll stick with it but not for much longer."

=== Ratings ===
According to the unofficial overnight viewing figures, "Sheriff Got Your Tongue?" had an average audience of 6.7 million across its forty-five minutes, 1.5 million fewer viewers than the average for the opening episode of the series. This put Robin Hood second in its timeslot, with 0.6 million fewer viewers than the average audience for The X-Factor on ITV1 at the same time. In terms of audience share, "Sheriff Got Your Tongue?" managed 30% of the total available viewing audience for its slot, as against 35% for The X-Factor in its 5.50–7.50pm slot.

In the official viewing figures released by the Broadcaster's Audience Research Board (BARB) a week and a half later, which included recordings watched within one week of broadcast, "Sheriff Got Your Tongue?" recorded a final average audience of 7.18 million. This placed it fifth for all BBC One programmes in the week of 9 October – 15 October 2006, behind three episodes of EastEnders and one of Casualty. Across all channels it placed twentieth for the week, behind an additional fifteen programmes on ITV1.
