= Who Shot the Sheriff? =

- Robin Hood episode
- The Sheriff orders De Fourtnoy to carry out more killings.
- Episode no.: Season 1 Episode 3
- Directed by: Richard Standeven
- Written by: Paul Cornell
- Production code: 103
- Original air date: October 21, 2006

Episode chronology
← Previous "Sheriff Got Your Tongue?"	Next → "Parent Hood"

"Who Shot the Sheriff?" is the third episode of the 2006 Robin Hood television series, made by Tiger Aspect Productions for BBC One. It aired on Saturday October 21, 2006 at 7.15pm. Despite the episode's title, the Sheriff is not shot, as the title is just a reference to the song "I Shot the Sheriff" by Bob Marley, which is also alluded to in the episode's dialogue when the Sheriff tells an assassin that he has in fact only shot a deputy.

== Plot ==
A Bailiff is assassinated by a mysterious archer. The villagers suspect Robin Hood is the culprit, and the Sheriff of Nottingham uses this to turn the people against the 6 outlaws, while Robin suspects the mysterious Nightwatchman, who leaves food and medicines for the poor. Marian finds her friend Joe Lacey, who says he had been called out of retirement to work as a castle guard.

The Sheriff sends De Fourtnoy, the Master-At-Arms, to spread the word all around that Robin was the killer of the Bailiff. But when a young boy is also shot dead, the Sheriff realizes that Robin isn't the killer of either of them, but anyway tells De Fourtnoy to spread the word that Robin also killed the young boy, just to get all the villagers against him; although the Sheriff also tells De Fourtnoy to find the real assassin. The Sheriff later orders De Fourtnoy to kill 3 more innocent people, to blame on Robin, who is with his gang being chased by Gisborne and his hunting dogs. Marian meets with Joe Lacey again, and they talk about the past. She also finds out from him how to actually fire an arrow from a bow, properly.

Robin makes a deal with the Sheriff to catch the assassin, who is after the Sheriff, in exchange for calling off the dogs. Robin then visits Marian, and she tells him that she suspects De Fourtnoy for the killings. The next day, the Nightwatchman witnesses Joe Lacey trying to kill the Sheriff. Robin and Much find the Nightwatchman and discover that it's really Marian. She tells them that the real assassin is Lacey (who lied to Marian about why he was on duty), and then Marian leads them to him. Lacey tells Robin that he wanted revenge on the Bailiff and the Sheriff for allowing his sick wife to die; Lacey had intentionally killed the Bailiff, but killing the young boy was an accident because the arrow had missed the Sheriff. Robin tells Lacey not to kill the Sheriff now as the innocent villagers would be held responsible and tortured, but Lacey neglects this so Robin and Marian threaten to shoot him if he doesn't put the bow down, but Lacey anyway shoots who he believes to be the Sheriff, and Lacey is himself shot in the arm by Robin and Marian at exactly the same time. It turns out that Lacey killed the Deputy (incidentally the Sheriff's lookalike), and then the real Sheriff has Gisborne kill Lacey.

Robin immediately realizes that Lacey wasn't behind the later 3 killings, but the Sheriff was, and Robin confronts him in his carriage. He threatens to kill the Sheriff, but the Sheriff ironically uses this to say that "no one will ever know" that Robin isn't a killer, and literally kicks Robin right out of the carriage, and Robin then runs into the forest with his gang. Gisborne kills De Fourtnoy on the Sheriff's orders, to silence him about what the Sheriff asked him to do, which also benefited Gisborne from having no more competition to being the Master-At-Arms. Robin has Little John open up the mill, and Robin regains the trust of the villagers.

== Reception ==
=== Reviews ===
The Guardian newspaper's Saturday listings magazine supplement The Guide previewed "Who Shot The Sheriff?" on the day of transmission, with reviewer Jonathan Wright giving the episode a generally positive assessment, feeling that the more serious tone of the episode compared to the first two worked well. "If the change of pace initially jars, it ultimately works thanks to a well-constructed script from Paul Cornell."

The Radio Times magazine's previewer David Butcher had mixed feelings on the episode. While accusing it of having a "subtle-as-a-thumbscrew subtext" and accusing the central character of being "the first swashbuckler in history who never hurt a fly and shies away from a fight whenever he can." However, he did comment on "some nicely charged encounters" between Robin and the Sheriff, and his overall verdict was that "It's lacking in tension (there's a blindingly obvious twist) but not in enjoyment, as Keith Allen (the Sheriff) and William Beck (Roy) steal their respective scenes and show the rest of the cast what acting looks like."

=== Ratings ===
"Who Shot The Sheriff?" gained an average audience of 6 million viewers according to the unofficial overnight ratings information. This gave the episode a 27% share of the available television audience in its slot, placing it second in the ratings at the time behind The X-Factor on ITV1, which had an average of 7.2 million viewers and a 35% audience share. This was the second week in a row in which Robin Hood had been beaten in the ratings by The X-Factor, and the second successive week in which the programme's viewing figure had fallen.
