= Will You Tolerate This? =

- Robin Hood episode
- Robin prepares to duel
- Episode no.: Season 1 Episode 1
- Directed by: John McKay
- Written by: Dominic Minghella
- Production code: 101
- Original air date: 7 October 2006

Episode chronology
← Previous —	Next → "Sheriff Got Your Tongue?"

"Will You Tolerate This?" is the first episode of the 2006 Robin Hood television series, made by Tiger Aspect Productions for BBC One. It aired on Saturday 7 October 2006 at 7.05pm. The title of the episode refers to a line of dialogue near the end, where Robin asks the public at Nottingham Castle: "Will you tolerate this injustice? (I, for one, will not)".

== Plot ==
In 1192, Robin of Locksley and his artless man-servant Much have returned to Nottinghamshire, England after spending 5 years fighting for King Richard in the Holy Land. They save another man named Allan A Dale from mounted soldiers who were about to cut off Allan's hand for trying to poach a deer. Robin tries to convince soldiers that he has them surrounded. However, after they begin to leave, Much comes out of hiding, and from his taunts the soldiers realize there are only the two opponents. The pair proceed to run for their lives.

Robin and Much manage to evade the soldiers. The next day, they meet a weaver, and Robin decides to spend some time working for him. However, Robin is seduced by his daughter, and Much attempts to distract the weaver to no avail. The weaver and Robin fight before he escapes again. Robin and Much finally arrive in Locksley. They find Robin's recently widowed friend Dan Scarlett, also a carpenter, who built half of Locksley. He explains how he chose to have his hand cut off to protect his two sons Will and Luke, who had been caught stealing. Sir Guy of Gisborne, the current ruler of the area, arrives, where Robin announces his return. Robin makes himself at home once more and proclaims Much a free man after his bravery in the Crusades. Much has something to eat and a bath, but soon gets out when Robin tells him he is off to visit Edward, the Sheriff of Nottingham.

Robin and Much receive a hostile reception from Edward and his daughter Marian, Robin's love interest. Knowing Edward is a good man, Robin and Much find out from him that night that he had no choice as he is no longer sheriff because Prince John appointed a sadistic man named Vaisey to take his place. Robin finally arrives at the castle and sees no one has enough money for Wednesday market. He confronts Sheriff Vaisey at the Council and suggests that he abolish taxes, though the Sheriff bites back. Robin also learns that Will and Luke have been caught stealing again. Robin enters the dungeons to learn they will be hanged, and also meets Allan again, exposed as lying about having a wife and an unborn baby.

The next day, Robin has to read out the sentence for Will, Luke, Allan, and another young man. The Sheriff has Much held by two soldiers at a great height. A priest interferes by saying he and the Bishop are protecting the men by invoking the benefit of clergy, but is revealed to be a friend of Robin's, and the Sheriff promptly orders his arrest. With the 4 victims dangling, Robin uses a bow to shoot the ropes, saving each of them. Robin then throws a sword to free Much. A soldier attempts to kill Robin, but Marian kills the soldier by throwing a knife at his neck, with only Robin noticing. Robin and Much are joined by Allan and Will. The 4 of them escape on horseback and make it to Sherwood Forest, where Robin makes the 3 men outlaws in his gang. Will goes to get some kindling. Robin, Much and Allan are then confronted by another 4 men including the burly leader, Little John.

== Reception ==
=== Reviews ===
Previewing the episode for the BBC's Radio Times listings magazine, the magazine's television editor Alison Graham gave "Will You Tolerate This?" a generally lukewarm assessment. "[T]his is hardly stirring stuff. Jonas Armstrong as Robin is a pipsqueak of the type you'd send into the garden to play with his bow and arrow... But things pick up once Robin has assembled his merry men... And Armitage flounces darkly as Guy of Gisborne."

A. A. Gill, the television critic of The Sunday Times, was even harsher in his write-up of the episode, reviewing it for the paper the day after it had been screened. "Magyar gangsters stole half the film and held it to ransom — which was critically appropriate. Sadly, they didn’t get all of it... I’ll tell you how bad all this was: Keith Allen was the best thing in it, that’s how bad it was."

David Belcher of Scottish broadsheet The Herald was far more positive in his view, picking up on the episode's political allegory. "In a political sense, things were much worse in Britain in 1192. Back then, as Robin Hood's opening instalment made clear, this nation was engaged in a ruinously expensive and unwinnable war in the Middle East at the behest of an expansive global superpower." He also praised the cast, feeling that Armstrong "succeeds in being likeably noble, a possible sufferer from crusades-induced post-traumatic stress, yet still spry... But it's the baddies who give the new Robin Hood its winning tension. Guy of Gisborne is a cool and sinister lizard. Keith Allen portrays the Sheriff of Nottingham with subtle brio."

The Guardian newspaper's review expressed disappointment with the episode, but pointed out that there was still plenty of time for the series to improve. "These are very early days (12 more episodes to go), and Robin and his posse haven't yet set up camp in the forest. I have no idea if there'll be archery competitions, or log fights between big men on small bridges, but the spirit of the thing seems not to have been lost through modernisation. I'm looking forward to more. Come on, it's Robin Hood — he steals from the rich to give to the poor!"

=== Ratings ===
In the unofficial overnight viewing figures, "Will You Tolerate This?" gained a 37% share of the total television audience available during its timeslot, which equated to an average of 8.2 million viewers across the forty-five minutes. The viewership peaked at 8.5 million. This put the programme over a million viewers ahead of the nearest competition in its timeslot, the light entertainment show Ant and Dec's Saturday Night Takeaway on ITV1. Ant and Dec gained 31.1% of the available audience, with an average of 7 million viewers.

In the official viewing figures released by the Broadcaster's Audience Research Board (BARB) a week and a half later, which included recordings watched within one week of broadcast, "Will You Tolerate This?" recorded a final average audience of 8.56 million. This placed it fifth for all BBC One programmes in the week of 2 October – 8 October 2006, behind three episodes of EastEnders and one of Strictly Come Dancing. Across all channels it placed eleventh for the week, behind an additional six programmes on ITV1 — five episodes of Coronation Street and one of The X-Factor.

== Merchandise ==
The story was released by BBC Audiobooks on 6 November 2006, read by Richard Armitage, who plays Guy of Gisborne, and written by Kirst Neale. Also featured is an interview with Armitage, discussing the filming of the TV series.
