= Richard Burrell =

British television drama producer

Richard Burrell is a British television drama producer and executive producer.

He was educated at Pangbourne College. He was an actor in the National Youth Theatre and studied English and Drama at the University of Surrey graduating with a BA in 1990. He has Produced or Exec Produced Waking The Dead, Robin Hood, Filth: The Mary Whitehouse Story, The Invisibles, All The Small Things, Silent Witness, Framed and New Tricks.

Richard was involved in the retrieval of the missing tapes for the BBC's Robin Hood in Budapest.
