= Chloe Moss =

English playwright, screenwriter (born 1976)

Chloë Moss
- Born: 1976 (age 49–50); Liverpool, England
- Education: Manchester Metropolitan University
- Occupations: Playwright, screenwriter
- Awards: Susan Smith Blackburn Playwriting Prize

Chloë Moss (born 1976 in Liverpool) is an English playwright and screenwriter.

== Early life ==
Moss grew up in Liverpool and attended Manchester Metropolitan University, where she studied film. She joined the Royal Court's Young Writers programme and wrote her first professional play, A Day In Dull Armour.

== Career ==
She soon became a writer-in-residence at the Bush and is under commission to the Manchester Royal Exchange, the Royal Court, Paines Plough, Liverpool Everyman, and Clean Break (theatre company).

Other work includes How Love is Spelt, which opened at the Bush Theatre London in November 2004 and Off-Broadway in August 2005; Christmas Is Miles Away (Royal Exchange Theatre Manchester, November 2005, transferring to the Bush in February 2006); and The Way Home (Liverpool Everyman, November 2006). Catch—a collaborative piece written with four other playwrights (April De Angelis, Laura Wade, Stella Feehily, and Tanika Gupta)—premièred at The Royal Court in December 2006.

This Wide Night played at the Soho Theatre in 2008. A commission from Clean Break (directed by Lucy Morrison), the play went on to a subsequent tour of women's prisons around the UK.

The Gatekeeper premiered at the Royal Exchange, Manchester in February 2012.

Moss began working in television in the late 2000s, writing multiple episodes for the Channel 4 soap Hollyoaks and Secret Diary of a Call Girl. Other drama series she worked on included the fantasy series Switch, the firefighter drama The Smoke and the Charles Dickens reimagining Dickensian. Most recently, she wrote on period dramas Marie Antoinette and Call The Midwife.

Moss is a lecturer in playwriting at the University of Manchester.

== Awards ==
Moss won the Susan Smith Blackburn Playwriting Prize in 2009 for her play This Wide Night.

== Works ==
- A Day In Dull Armour (2002)
- How Love is Spelt, (2004)
- Christmas Is Miles Away (2005)
- The Way Home (play) (2006)
- Catch (2006)
- Indigo (2007)
- A Model Girl (2007)
- This Wide Night (2008)
- The Gatekeeper (2012)
- Run Sister Run (2020)
- Corrina, Corrina (2022)
- The Guilty (2026), adapted from the screenplay Den Skyldige written by Gustav Möller and Emil Nygaard Albertsen
