= How Love Is Spelt =

2005 play by Chloe Moss

How Love is Spelt is a 2005 play written by Chloe Moss.

== Production ==
It was first produced at the Bush Theatre in London and is available in print from Nick Hern Books.

The play was revived in November 2006 at the Space in London's Docklands by 'Built-Up'. The cast included Mark Aidan, Katie Beswick, Kaijah McMahon, Debra Baker, and Martin Mulgrew. The production was directed by Jamie Wheeler.

== Plot ==
It tells the story of Peta, who has escaped from Liverpool to London after discovering that she is pregnant. The play all takes place in Peta's London flat and is a series of duologues between Peta and five other characters (Joe, Steven, Chantelle, Marion, and Colin) who all help Peta to reveal something about herself.
