= Foz Allan =

British producer and scriptwriter

Foz Allan is a British producer and screenwriter, founder of Brycoed, a production company.

== Career ==
Allan trained as an actor at Rose Bruford College of Speech and Drama. He began his career as an Associate Director at the Bristol Old Vic Theatre and a Radio Drama producer with productions for BBC Radio 4, Radio Wales and the BBC World Service while his career in television started in 1996 when he worked as an executive producer on Satellite City. He is known for his work as the creator of popular BBC drama Robin Hood, the first series of the CBBC show The Dumping Ground, and more recently Sky Atlantic's Riviera. He was the executive producer of the 2022 Netflix series Treason.

== Television ==
=== Producer ===
- 2025: Hostage (TV series) (Executive Producer)
- 2022: Treason (TV series) (Executive Producer)
- 2017: Riviera by Neil Jordan (Producer)
- 2015: Jerkyll and Hyde series 1 by Charlie Higson (Series Producer)
- 2014: Hetty Feather series 1 adaptation of novel by Jacqueline Wilson (Executive Producer)
- 2014: "Harriet's Army" 90 mins family drama by Guy Burt (Producer)
- 2012–2013: Wolfblood series 2 (Producer)
- 2013: The Dumping Ground (BAFTA: Best Children's Series, )(Executive Producer)
- 2011–2012: Wolfblood (Winner: Royal Television Society, Banff 'Rockie', BAFTA) (Originating Producer)
- 2006–2009: Robin Hood (2006 TV series) (Co-Creator and Executive Producer)
- 2006: Vital Signs (Executive Producer)
- 2006: Pinochet in Suburbia (Executive Producer)
- 2002–2003: Casualty BAFTA NOMINATION (Series Producer)
- 2000–2002: Belonging BAFTA CYMRU Best Drama (Originating Producer/ Executive Producer)
- 2001: Score (Producer)
- 1999: High Hopes: Saving Private Ryan
- 1999: Hang the DJ (Producer)
- 1997–1999: Two Lives international: Washed Up BAFTA CYMRU Best Drama, Tattoo You (Director/Producer)
- 1996–1998: Satellite City (Executive Producer)

=== Screenwriter ===
- Robin Hood
  - Something Worth Fighting For, Part 2
  - Something Worth Fighting For, Part 1
  - The Enemy of My Enemy
  - Bad Blood
  - A Dangerous Deal
