= Robin Hood (2006 TV series) =

2006 television series

- Title sequence for series 2 and 3
- Genre: Drama; Adventure; Folklore
- Created by: Dominic Minghella & Foz Allan based on traditional legends
- Starring: Jonas Armstrong; Lucy Griffiths; Richard Armitage; David Harewood; Keith Allen; Gordon Kennedy; Sam Troughton; Joe Armstrong; Harry Lloyd; William Beck; Anjali Jay; Lara Pulver; Clive Standen; Joanne Froggatt; Toby Stephens
- Composer: Andy Price
- Country of origin: United Kingdom
- Original language: English
- No. of series: 3
- No. of episodes: 39 (list of episodes)

Production
- Running time: 45 minutes
- Production companies: Tiger Aspect Productions; BBC Studios

Original release
- Network: BBC One
- Release: 7 October 2006 – 27 June 2009

Related
- Robin Hood (1953)

Robin Hood is a British television programme, produced by independent production company Tiger Aspect Productions for BBC One, with co-funding from the BBC America cable television channel in the United States. Based on the traditional stories of legendary English folk hero Robin Hood, the programme started on 7 October 2006. Series two commenced broadcasting on 6 October 2007 with the final two episodes on 29 December 2007. Series three began airing on 28 March 2009 for a thirteen-episode run. The series was cancelled by the BBC after series three following the departure of multiple actors, including lead Jonas Armstrong.

== Production ==
Comprising thirteen 45-minute episodes per series, Robin Hood was created by Dominic Minghella and Foz Allan, who serve as executive producers on the series, with Minghella the chief writer. Minghella was previously responsible for the successful ITV network comedy-drama series Doc Martin. Richard Burrell is the producer, and the other writers involved on the first series were Paul Cornell, Mark Wadlow, Debbie Oates, Kurti & Doyle and Joe Turner.

The first series had a reported budget of £8 million. The programme was specifically designed to run in the same Saturday evening family drama slot as the successful revival of Doctor Who, filling the slot in Doctor Who's absence between series. Shot in the high definition format, the programme was also broadcast on the BBC's BBC HD service.

Robin Hood was announced as a possible commission by BBC One Controller Peter Fincham in July 2005, but not officially confirmed by Head of Drama Jane Tranter until 24 October that year. On 18 February 2006, the Daily Mirror newspaper announced that actor Jonas Armstrong had been cast in the lead role in the series. This was confirmed by the BBC in a press release on 3 April 2006, which announced that filming on the series had begun in Hungary and also announced further casting.

On Thursday 23 November 2006, the BBC confirmed that the programme had been renewed for a second series, to be shown in 2007. Filming began in March 2007, and the first episode of the second series aired at 7:30pm on Saturday 6 October 2007.

Lucy Griffiths, who played Marian, left at the end of the show's second series, although she made a brief appearance at the conclusion of the third series. Harry Lloyd and Anjali Jay also departed at the end of the second series.

Joining the cast for the third series were David Harewood as Friar Tuck, Joanne Froggatt, as a character named "Kate", a Locksley villager, Lara Pulver, as Guy of Gisborne's sister Isabella, Toby Stephens as Prince John, and Clive Standen as Archer, Robin's half brother. On 7 August 2008 it was announced that Jonas Armstrong would be leaving the programme at the conclusion of the third series, in "an explosive and nail-biting finale."

In January 2009, the writer Sally Wainwright told The Stage entertainment industry newspaper that she had been asked to oversee a creative revamp of the programme for its fourth series. The BBC confirmed to the paper that she had been asked to work on ideas for the show, but despite this, the fourth series was not commissioned.

== Characters ==
The majority of the main characters in Robin Hood are based on the English folk tale of the same name. The title character (Jonas Armstrong) has returned to England after five years fighting in the Third Crusade as part of the King's Guard. He is shocked to find the Sheriff of Nottingham, Vaisey (Keith Allen), running the town with an iron fist upon his return. Robin is soon made an outlaw, and takes it upon himself to steal from the rich to feed the poor along with his gang, which consists of his best friend Much (Sam Troughton); two young men he saved from hanging, Will Scarlett (Harry Lloyd) and Allan A Dale (Joe Armstrong); the ex-leader of a band of outlaws already in the woods, Little John (Gordon Kennedy); and another young man named Roy (short for "Royston White") (William Beck), who is killed in episode 4, and replaced in episode 5 by Djaq (Anjali Jay), a Saracen slave using the alias of her dead brother. Robin is pleased to find that Lady Marian (Lucy Griffiths) is still unmarried. It is hinted that they had previously been romantically linked in their youth, prior to Robin leaving to fight in the Holy Land. Their relationship upon his return is strained, but develops into a friendship. Their relationship comes to a dramatic climax in the series one finale, both admitting their love for one another. A love triangle challenges their relationship in series two with Marian becoming closer to the Sheriff's second-in-command, Sir Guy of Gisborne (Richard Armitage). Guy often puts Marian in difficult situations where she has to appear to help him, when actually working to protect Robin and the people of Nottingham. Marian has her own alias,'The night watchman' dubbed by the people she secretly helps; Robin is initially unaware, until her identity is revealed in episode three of the first season. The Sheriff plots to kill King Richard (played by Steven Waddington) in his role as leader of the Black Knights, who wish to place Prince John on the throne. The Sheriff constantly tries to capture or kill Robin and the outlaws for continuously interfering in his scheme to take over England. The second series sees the Sheriff step up his plans, culminating in a battle in the Holy Land. The outlaws foil the Sheriff's attack on King Richard with the aid of Marian, but she is killed by Guy of Gisborne whilst protecting the injured King. Robin and Marian are married as she lies dying, with the outlaw gang as witnesses. Djaq and Will, now together, decide to stay in the Holy Land after they encounter a friend of Djaq's uncle.

The third series staggered the entry of new characters and only Robin appeared in all thirteen episodes. As the series opens, Tuck (David Harewood), a spiritual preacher returning to England, and Kate (Joanne Froggatt), a Locksley villager, are introduced; both soon become part of Robin's gang. Isabella (Lara Pulver), Gisborne's younger sister who is running from an abusive husband, arrives soon after and starts a secret relationship with Robin. Her link to the castle through Gisborne is used by the gang while she plots revenge against her brother, but her thirst for independence, power, and vengeance soon leads her to become a ruthless Sheriff and a sworn enemy. Toby Stephens appears as Prince John in three episodes mid-series, successfully exploiting the rift between Gisborne and Vaisey, leading to the latter's supposed death at Gisborne's hand. Gisborne is briefly made Sheriff before Isabella uses her influence to replace him, leaving Gisborne a fugitive seeking revenge. This opens the door to a liaison with Robin and sets up the tenth episode of the series, told largely through flashbacks, which revisits Robin and Gisborne's history. It features Dean Lennox Kelly, Sophie Winkleman, Paul Hilton, and Ian Reddington as Robin's father, Gisborne's parents, and another past Locksley villager respectively, and reveals the existence of Archer (played by Clive Standen from episode 11), the illegitimate child of Robin's father and Gisborne's mother, who Robin's dying father begs them to find. Archer is Robin's equal with a bow and arrow. (This, coupled with his biological ties to Robin, Gisborne and Isabella, led to speculation that he was set to take over the programme's lead role following Jonas Armstrong's departure.) The two-part finale sees Vaisey return, and the deaths of Robin, Gisborne and Allan.

== Episode guide ==
=== Media coverage ===
On Saturday 8 July 2006, the BBC showed the first teaser trailer for the series – a shot of a flaming arrow flying into the BBC One logo in the corner of the screen as the Robin Hood logo and "Coming Soon" were displayed above. This teaser ran either side of the Doctor Who series finale on BBC One, and was shown on several other occasions on various BBC channels over the following weeks. A longer trailer with actual dialogue from many of the characters was previewed in the Video Room of the Sherwood Forest Visitor Centre during the first week of August 2006, as part of the community's Robin Hood Festival.

The BBC's Radio Times listings magazine ran a short preview article for the series, as part of a feature showcasing the best of the autumn series television line-up, in its 2–8 September 2006 edition, published on 29 August 2006, the day after the tape theft story was publicised in the press (see above). Wrote the magazine's correspondent Benji Wilson: "Why watch it? You can't beat a good ruckus – Armstrong and his merry co-stars all enrolled at a specially-commissioned 'Hood academy' before filming in Hungary, where they were drilled in horse riding, sword skills and archery." The article was accompanied by a large publicity photo of Armstrong in costume.

The first full reviews for the programme began appearing on 7 September 2006, after a preview of the opening episode had been shown at the press launch the previous evening. The website of The Guardian said that: "The challenge for the new Robin Hood is to appeal to younger viewers while pulling in their parents as well. It will be no easy task. About as difficult, in fact, as simultaneously firing two arrows from the same bow, and both hitting the target. But as Robin showed in the opening episode, it can be done." In The Times, critic Paul Hoggart backed the series to be a success: "Armstrong as the rather understated Robin Hood should still be moodily cheeky enough to find his way on to the bedroom walls of a few hundred thousand pubertal girls, and Lucy Griffiths as Marian is inevitably feisty. But the villains steal the show, with Richard Armitage's Guy of Gisborne off-setting Keith Allen's gags as the mocking, heavily sarcastic Sheriff. The audience including cast, crew and their friends cheered at the end but this remake should go down well with families at home, too."

The BBC began running longer trailers for the programme on Saturday 16 September 2006, with the first being shown following the final episode of How Do You Solve A Problem Like Maria? on BBC One. This was one of three specially shot trailers, directed by Matt Losasso, each introducing one of the main characters, Robin, Marian and the Sheriff of Nottingham who are seen speaking to camera. The extended Robin version, featuring Armstrong escaping from a cell, was shown in cinemas. Billboard advertisements were also taken out by the BBC and the Radio Times devoted the cover of its 7–13 October 2006 edition, published on 3 October, to the series, with a photo of Armstrong and Armitage in character.

Reviewers have had mixed opinions as to the effectiveness of the show's use of modern styles and current political references. Several episodes of Dead Ringers broadcast in February and March 2007 mocked Robin Hood for its anachronistic approach. Since its broadcast, it has gained a significant cult following along with similar BBC shows including Merlin and Atlantis.

== International sales ==
As a co-producer on the series, BBC America owns the United States broadcast rights to the programme, which debuted on the channel on Saturday 3 March 2007. It aired in syndication on U.S. cable channel The Inspiration Network from 2013 to 2014 and on Ovation from 2014 to 2015. In Australia, the programme began playing mid-2007 on the Australian Broadcasting Corporation's 19:30 Sunday slot. From April 2008 it was broadcast in Serbia on channel B92. In Spain the programme started on 4 January 2008 on La Sexta, in the 21.00 slot. In Hong Kong, the programme started on 6 June 2008 on ATV World on Monday 20:00 slot. The Sales have also been agreed with broadcasters in India, Sri Lanka, Denmark, France, Italy, Greece, New Zealand, Poland, North Macedonia, Portugal, Sweden, Finland, Norway, Israel, Canada, Czech Republic, Latin America and Switzerland. Broadcast in Sri Lanka began in 2009 in the National Television, Rupavahini; last episode was aired on 18 April 2010.

The first series became available on iTunes in May 2008. However, since the second series was just beginning in the United States, the Series two episodes are released on iTunes on a weekly basis, corresponding with the public releases. The series was previously available on Netflix, but has been discontinued. As of September 2018, the entire series is available to watch on Hulu and Amazon Prime.

== Home releases ==
Series	DVD Title	Episodes	Release Date		
Series	DVD Title	Episodes	UK	U.S.	AU
1	Volume One	5	13 November 2006	–	–
1	Volume Two	4	22 January 2007	–	–
1	Volume Three	4	26 February 2007	–	–
1	Complete Series One	13	26 February 2007	5 June 2007	February 2007
2	Complete Series Two	13	3 November 2008	28 July 2008	2 April 2008
3	Complete Series Three	13	29 June 2009	12 Jan 2010	29 June 2010

== Soundtrack ==
A CD album containing the incidental music soundtrack to the television series, produced by Tiger Aspect, was released on the EMI label. Composed by Andy Price, the music is performed by the Danubia Symphony Orchestra and was performed at the Budapest Opera House, production of the series having been based near Budapest. The CD was released mid-way through the programme's first series in November 2006.

=== Track listing ===
#	Track title	Track length
1	"Robin Hood Theme"	0:40
2	"Journey Home"	0:30
3	"Run Master! Run!"	1:01
4	"Locksley"	2:02
5	"Marian's Theme"	1:21
6	"Your Eyes"	0:51
7	"Rescue"	3:11
8	"The Sheriff Gets His Man"	3:06
9	"Scaling The Walls"	0:56
10	"Outlaws"	2:15
11	"From The Rich To The Poor"	1:19
12	"Chasing The Nightwatchman"	0:31
13	"Flush Him Out"	1:08
14	"Proving His Innocence"	2:33
15	"A Noble Deed"	1:31
16	"Gisbourne's Trap"	2:00
17	"Shooting Pies"	1:54
18	"Robin and Marian"	2:05
19	"Marian's Punishment"	1:48
20	"Two Mothers"	3:08
21	"Where Is She?"	1:38
22	"Him I Liked"	1:32
23	"Different Directions"	0:49
24	"Silver Arrow"	1:56
25	"Gisbourne Woos Marian "	1:27
26	"The Sheriff's Plan"	2:17
27	"A Love That Cannot Be"	1:18
28	"Lucky George"	2:06
29	"He's My Brother"	0:55
30	"The Nightwatchman"	1:12
31	"The Hanging"	1:11
32	"No Way Out"	2:20
33	"I Never Told Her I Loved Her"	1:15
34	"Robin Hood End Credits"	1:28

== See also ==
- List of films and television series featuring Robin Hood

== Notes ==
- Cornell, Paul. Robin Hood and business ongoing Archived 15 August 2014 at the Wayback Machine. "Paul Cornell's House of Awkwardness". URL retrieved Thursday 9 February 2006.
- Deans, Jason. Robin Hood set for Saturday night revival (subscription link). "The Guardian". Thursday 14 July 2005.
- BBC series needs new Robin Hood. BBC News Online. Monday 24 October 2005.
