= Dominic Minghella =

British television producer (born 1966)

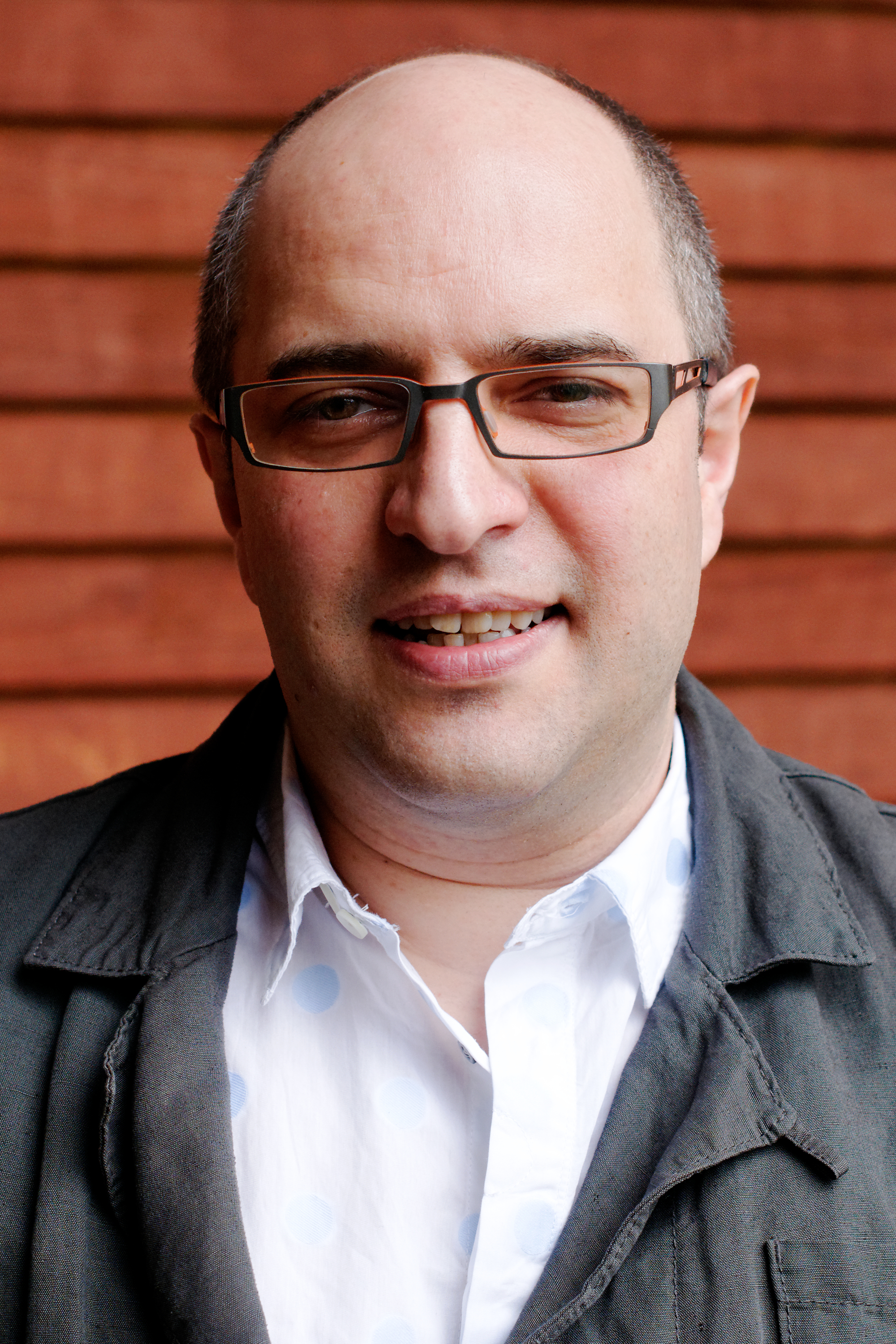
- Minghella at the 2011 Minghella Film Festival.
- Born: Dominic Albert Edward Minghella; 1966 (age 59–60)
- Occupations: Screenwriter; television producer
- Years active: 1996-2022
- Partner: Sarah Beardsall (3 children)

Dominic Albert Edward Minghella (born 1966) is a British television producer and screenwriter. His most successful project has been the creation of the ITV network comedy-drama series Doc Martin, starring Martin Clunes, which began in 2004. The main character's surname, Ellingham, is an anagram of the Minghella family name. Minghella was also the chief writer and show runner of BBC One's 2006 production Robin Hood, produced independently for the BBC by Tiger Aspect Productions.

== Early life and education ==
Minghella is from Ryde, Isle of Wight. His family ran a local café until the 1980s and an eponymous business making and selling Italian-style ice cream since the 1950s. Minghella is the brother of Loretta Minghella and the late Anthony Minghella, Max Minghella being his nephew. He read PPE at Merton College, Oxford.

== Career ==
As a child, Minghella starred in the first film his brother Anthony directed, A Little Like Drowning.

He co-wrote the film The Prince and the Pauper in 2000. Minghella was lead writer and executive producer of the BBC One series Robin Hood for the first two series, overseeing 26 episodes. Several of the place names used in the series were taken from place names on his native Isle of Wight. He has also written for Hamish Macbeth, starring Robert Carlyle, and for Boon.

Minghella was producer of the 2012 adaptation of Daphne du Maurier's novel, The Scapegoat, directed by Charles Sturridge and starring Matthew Rhys. He was also show runner for the first series of the American historical drama Knightfall.

In December 2018, as British Prime Minister Theresa May struggled to convince Parliament to support her Brexit agreement with the European Union, Minghella wrote and directed a three-minute political short 'The People's Vote', starring Andy Serkis in a parody of May as the two faces of his Gollum-Sméagol character, alternately coveting her 'precious' exit document and (less strongly) considering her duty to the British people, as support for a further referendum on the divisive issue.

== Personal life ==
In 2020, Minghella was hospitalised with COVID-19 and was unsure whether he would survive. After a few days of hospitalisation, he was well enough to be discharged.
