= Greatest Hits (Wilson Phillips album) =

Greatest hits album by Wilson Phillips
- Released: May 23, 2000
- Recorded: 1989–1997
- Genre: Pop; pop rock; soft rock
- Length: 61:04
- Label: SBK
- Producer: Glen Ballard; David A. Stewart; Brian Wilson; Rick Nowels; Billy Steinberg

Wilson Phillips chronology
Shadows And Light (1992)	Greatest Hits (2000)	California (2004)

Professional ratings
Review scores
Source	Rating
Allmusic	link

Greatest Hits is a greatest hits album by American vocal recording group Wilson Phillips, released on May 23, 2000, via SBK Records and Capitol Records and I.R.S. Records in Europe. Greatest Hits was the group's first official compilation album, although budget compilations had been released previously. The group broke up in early 1993 following member Chynna Phillips' departure. The liner notes for the album features track-by-track commentaries by sisters Carnie Wilson and Wendy Wilson.

The compilation album includes all eight singles from their first two studio albums Wilson Phillips (1990) and Shadows and Light (1992) and their 1991 cover of Elton John's "Daniel", which had success on adult contemporary radio despite not being a single. Most of the tracks are featured in their single edits, which had not been included yet on a Wilson Phillips album. It also includes solo material from both Chynna Phillips and Carnie and Wendy Wilson's group with their father, Brian Wilson, the Wilsons.

== Track listing ==
Greatest Hits track listing
No.	Title	Writer(s)	Original album(s)	Length
1.	"Hold On" (Single Edit)	Carnie Wilson; Chynna Phillips; Glen Ballard	Wilson Phillips (1990)	3:41
2.	"You Won't See Me Cry" (LP Version)	Wilson Phillips; Ballard	Shadows and Light (1992)	3:51
3.	"You're in Love" (Single/Radio Edit)	Wilson Phillips; Ballard	Wilson Phillips	4:07
4.	"Impulsive" (Single Edit)	Clif Magness; Steve Kipner	Wilson Phillips	3:56
5.	"Give It Up" (New Extended Radio 7")	Wilson Phillips; Ballard	Shadows and Light	4:00
6.	"Release Me" (Radio Edit)	Wilson Phillips	Wilson Phillips	3:51
7.	"The Dream Is Still Alive" (AC Remix)	Wilson Phillips; Ballard	Wilson Phillips	4:10
8.	"Flesh and Blood" (Single Edit)	Wilson Phillips; Ballard	Shadows and Light	4:04
9.	"Daniel" (LP Version)	Elton John; Bernie Taupin	Two Rooms: Celebrating the Songs of Elton John & Bernie Taupin (1991)	4:02
10.	"A Conversation with Wilson Phillips"		B-side to "You're in Love" (1991)	1:32
11.	"Hotel California" (Live in Japan)	Don Felder; Don Henley; Glenn Frey	Previously unreleased	8:52
12.	"Hold On" (Live in Japan)	C. Wilson; Phillips; Ballard	Previously unreleased	4:44
13.	"Naked and Sacred" (from Chynna Phillips)	Phillips; Billy Steinberg; Rick Nowels	Naked and Sacred (1995)	4:11
14.	"Miracle" (from The Wilsons, LP Version)	Bobby Blueball; David A. Stewart; Brian Wilson; C. Wilson; Wendy Wilson	The Wilsons (1997)	5:56
15.	"Everything I Need" (from The Wilsons, LP Version)	Tony Asher; B. Wilson	The Wilsons	3:29
Total length:				61:04
