= American Music Awards of 1991 =

US television program

18th Annual American Music Awards
- Date: January 28, 1991
- Location: Shrine Auditorium, Los Angeles, California
- Country: United States
- Hosted by: Keenen Ivory Wayans
- Most awards: MC Hammer (5)
- Most nominations: MC Hammer (7)

Television/radio coverage
- Network: ABC
- Runtime: 180 min.
- Produced by: Dick Clark Productions

The 18th Annual American Music Awards were held on January 28, 1991, at the Shrine Auditorium, in Los Angeles, California. The awards recognized the most popular artists and albums from the year 1990.

== Performances ==
Artist(s)	Song(s)
MC Hammer	"Here Comes The Hammer"
Mariah Carey	"Someday"
New Kids on the Block; Flavor Flav	"Games"
Clint Black	"Put Yourself in My Shoes"
Gloria Estefan	"Coming Out of the Dark"
Vanilla Ice	"Ice Ice Baby"
George Strait; Garth Brooks; Travis Tritt; Clint Black; The Kentucky Headhunters; Lorrie Morgan; Alan Jackson; Larry Gatlin; Patty Loveless; Roger Miller	Tribute to Merle Haggard: "If We Make It Through December" (Strait) "Mama Tried" (Brooks) "Today I Started Loving You Again" (Tritt) "Okie from Muskogee"
Poison	"Unskinny Bop"
Wilson Phillips	Medley: "Hold On" "Release Me" "Impulsive" "You're in Love"
Reba McEntire	"Fancy"
Bell Biv DeVoe	"B.B.D. (I Thought It Was Me)?"
INXS	"Disappear"

== Winners and nominees ==
Subcategory	Winner	Nominees
Pop/Rock Category
Favorite Pop/Rock Male Artist	Phil Collins	Michael Bolton; MC Hammer
Favorite Pop/Rock Female Artist	Janet Jackson	Paula Abdul; Mariah Carey; Madonna; Sinéad O'Connor
Favorite Pop/Rock Band/Duo/Group	Aerosmith	Bell Biv DeVoe; New Kids on the Block
Favorite Pop/Rock Album	...But Seriously – Phil Collins	Please Hammer, Don't Hurt 'Em – MC Hammer; Rhythm Nation 1814 – Janet Jackson
Favorite Pop/Rock Song	"Blaze of Glory" – Jon Bon Jovi	"Vogue" – Madonna "Hold On" – Wilson Phillips
Favorite Pop/Rock New Artist	Vanilla Ice	Mariah Carey; Wilson Phillips
Soul/R&B Category
Favorite Soul/R&B Male Artist	MC Hammer	Quincy Jones; Keith Sweat
Favorite Soul/R&B Female Artist	Janet Jackson	Regina Belle; Mariah Carey; Miki Howard; Lisa Stansfield
Favorite Soul/R&B Band/Duo/Group	Tony! Toni! Toné!	After 7 Bell Biv DeVoe
Favorite Soul/R&B Album	Please Hammer, Don't Hurt 'Em – MC Hammer	Rhythm Nation 1814 – Janet Jackson; Back on the Block – Quincy Jones
Favorite Soul/R&B Song	"U Can't Touch This" – MC Hammer	"Merry Go Round" – Keith Sweat "Feels Good" – Tony! Toni! Toné!
Favorite Soul/R&B New Artist	Bell Biv DeVoe	Johnny Gill; Lisa Stansfield
Country Category
Favorite Country Male Artist	George Strait	Clint Black; Garth Brooks
Favorite Country Female Artist	Reba McEntire	Patty Loveless; Kathy Mattea; Lorrie Morgan; K.T. Oslin
Favorite Country Band/Duo/Group	Alabama	The Judds; Shenandoah
Favorite Country Album	Reba Live – Reba McEntire	Killin' Time – Clint Black; Livin' It Up – George Strait
Favorite Country Song	"If Tomorrow Never Comes" – Garth Brooks	"Born to Be Blue" – The Judds "Love Without End, Amen" – George Strait
Favorite Country New Artist	Kentucky Headhunters	Alan Jackson; Travis Tritt
Dance Category
Favorite Dance Artist	Janet Jackson	Madonna; Michel'le
Favorite Dance Song	"Vogue" – Madonna	"Hold On" – En Vogue "The Power" – Snap!
Favorite Dance New Artist	Bell Biv DeVoe	En Vogue; Michel'le
Heavy Metal/Hard Rock Category
Favorite Heavy Metal/Hard Rock Artist	Aerosmith	Mötley Crüe; Poison
Favorite Heavy Metal/Hard Rock Album	Dr. Feelgood – Mötley Crüe	Pump – Aerosmith; Flesh & Blood – Poison
Favorite Heavy Metal/Hard Rock New Artist	Slaughter	Bruce Dickinson; Don Dokken
Rap/Hip-Hop Category
Favorite Rap/Hip-Hop Artist	MC Hammer	Too Short; Vanilla Ice
Favorite Rap/Hip-Hop Album	Please Hammer, Don't Hurt 'Em – MC Hammer	Fear of a Black Planet – Public Enemy; To the Extreme – Vanilla Ice
Favorite Rap/Hip-Hop New Artist	Vanilla Ice	Candyman; Digital Underground
Merit
Merle Haggard
