= List of number-one singles of 1990 (Canada) =

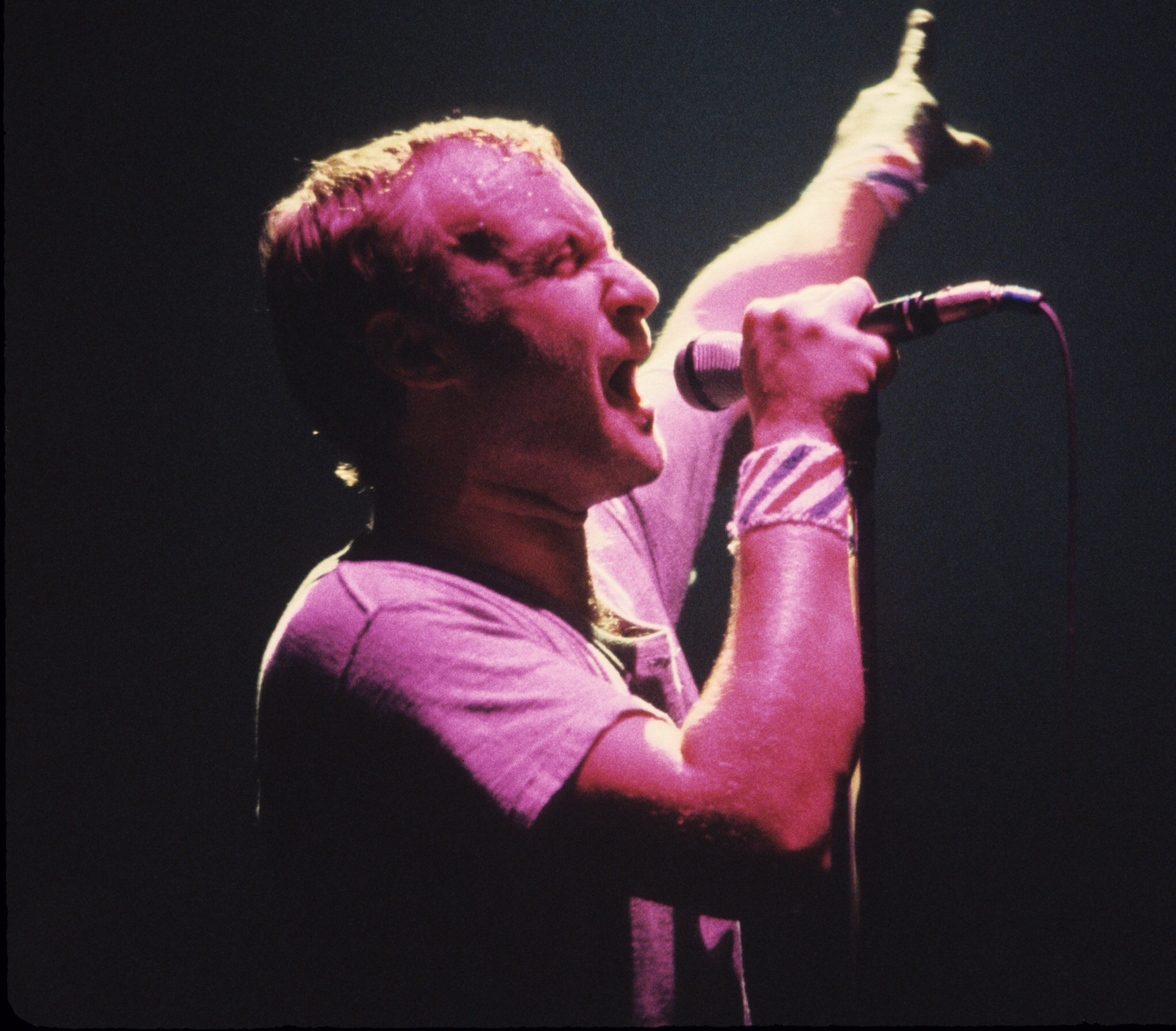
Phil Collins, who topped the Canadian chart with four songs in 1990, earned the best-performing single of the year with "I Wish It Would Rain Down", a six-week chart-topper.

RPM was a Canadian magazine that published the best-performing singles of Canada from 1964 to 2000. 1990 saw 21 songs reach the number-one spot in Canada. Phil Collins achieved the first number one of the year, "Another Day in Paradise", while Wilson Phillips stayed at number one into 1991 with "Impulsive". Nine different acts reached number one for the first time in 1990: The Wild Pair, Janet Jackson, Sinéad O'Connor, New Kids on the Block, Taylor Dayne, Mariah Carey, Wilson Phillips, Jon Bon Jovi without his band, and Alias—the only Canadian artist to reach number one during the year.

English singer Phil Collins was the most successful musician of 1990 in Canada, peaking at number one with four singles between January and October: "Another Day in Paradise", "I Wish It Would Rain Down", "Do You Remember?", and "Something Happened on the Way to Heaven"—all from his fourth album, ...But Seriously. "I Wish It Would Rain Down" remained at number one for six weeks in early spring, finishing 1990 as Canada's most successful single. Altogether, Collins spent 14 weeks at number one during the year, comprising more than a quarter of the calendar year.

Wilson Phillips was the only other act to reach number one with more than one song, rising to the top position with "Release Me" in September and "Impulsive" in December, totalling three weeks at number one. In May and June, Irish singer Sinéad O'Connor climbed to number one with "Nothing Compares 2 U" for five weeks while Mariah Carey and Alias stayed at number one for four weeks with "Vision of Love" and "More Than Words Can Say", respectively. Rod Stewart topped the chart for three weeks with "Downtown Train", as did Madonna with "Vogue".

Key
† Indicates best-performing single of 1990

== Chart history ==
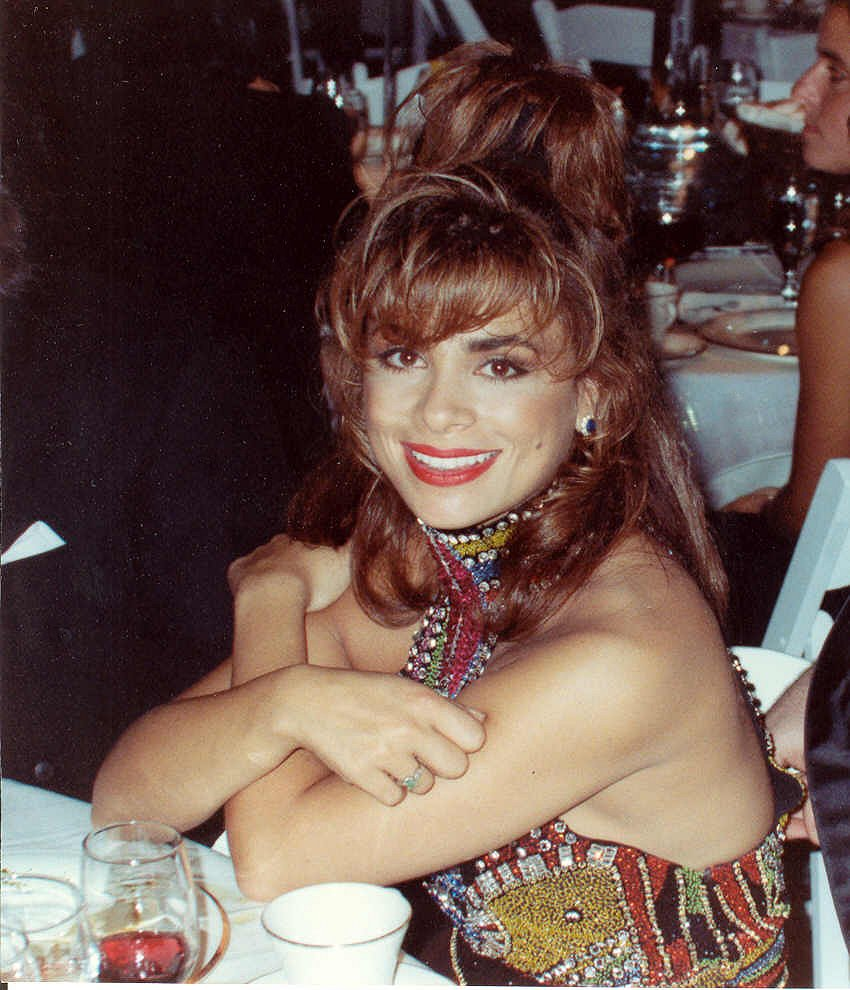
Paula Abdul spent two weeks at number one with "Opposites Attract".

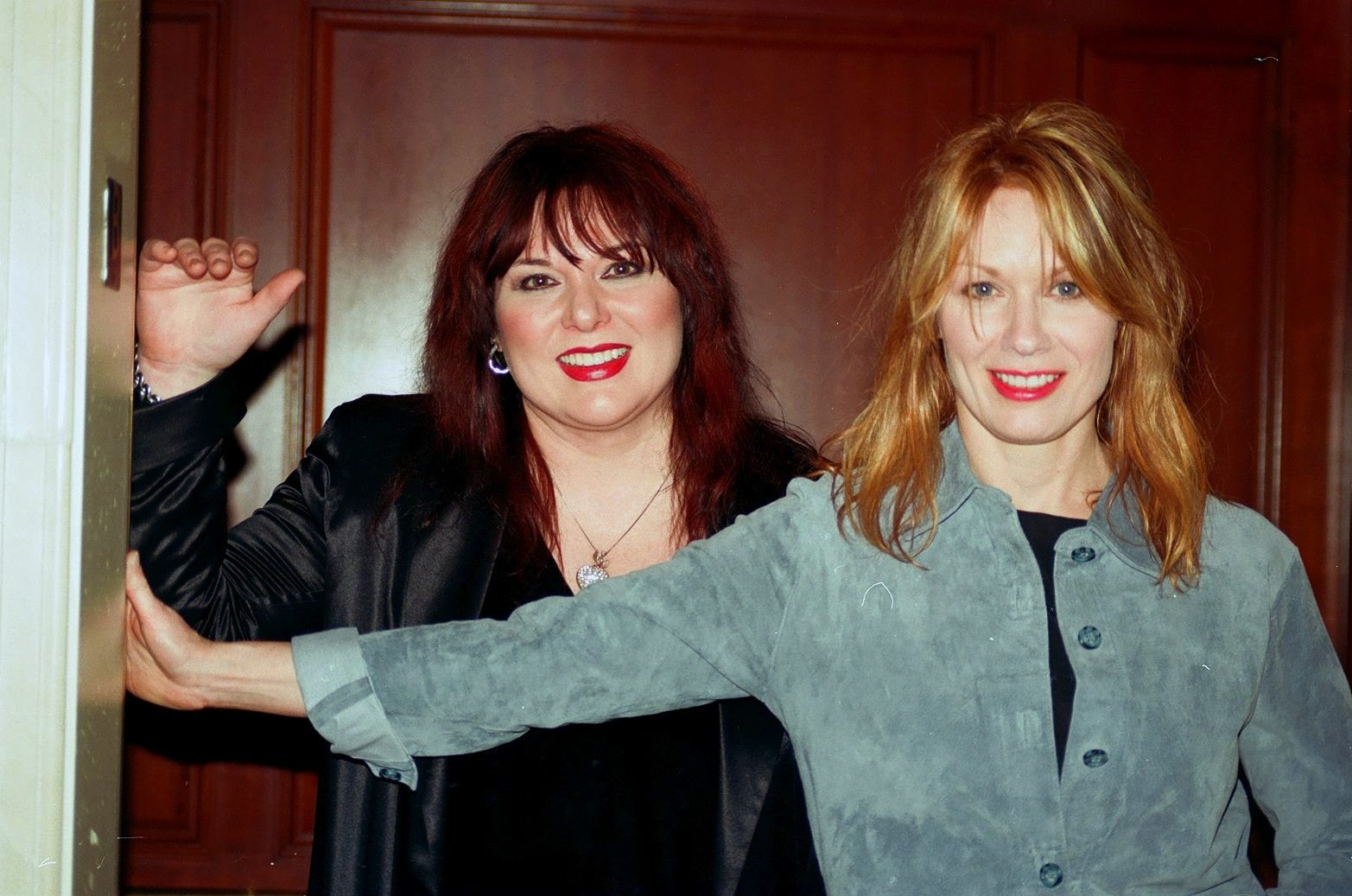
American rock band Heart (members Ann and Nancy Wilson pictured) reached number one for a single week with "All I Wanna Do Is Make Love to You".

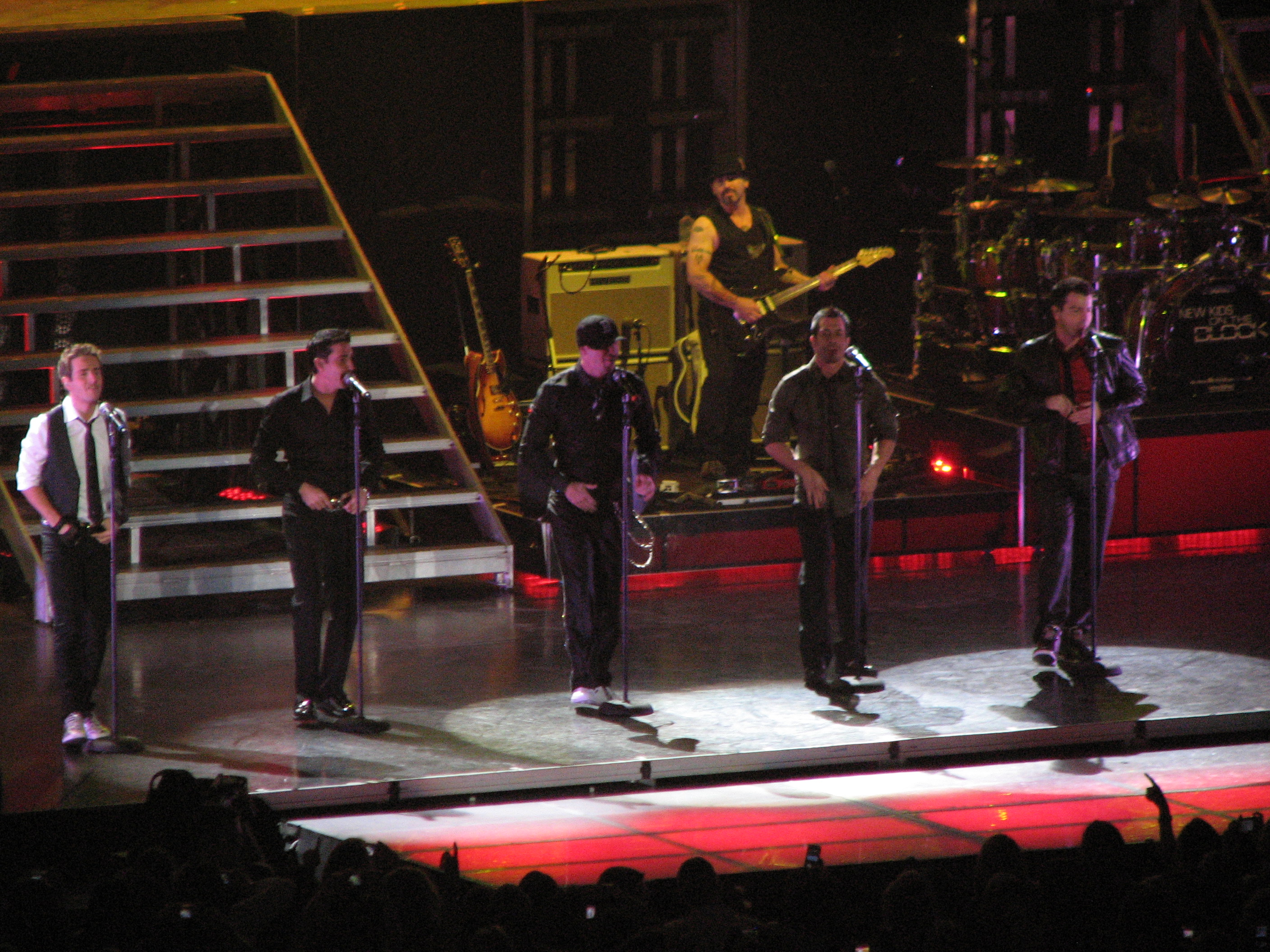
New Kids on the Block spent two weeks at number one in July with "Step by Step".

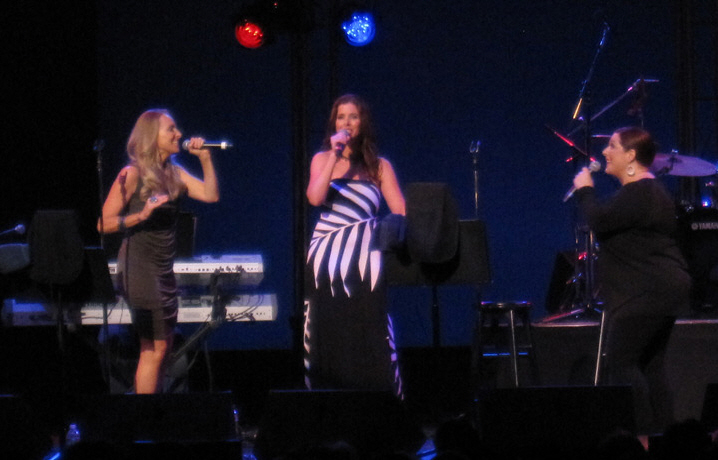
Wilson Phillips earned two number-one singles in Canada during 1990: "Release Me" and "Impulsive".

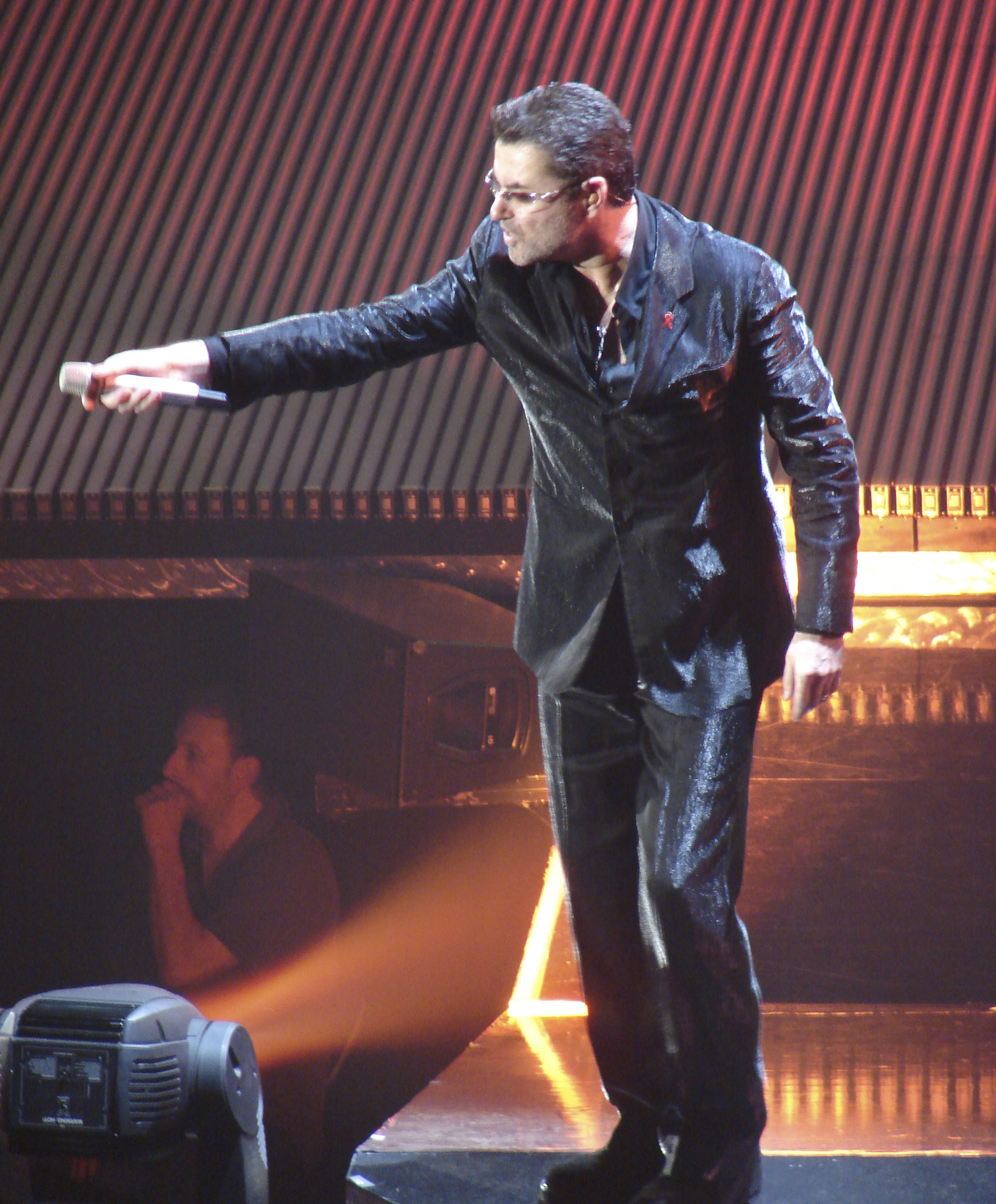
British singer George Michael topped the RPM chart for two weeks in late 1990 with "Praying for Time".

Issue date	Song	Artist	Reference
6 January (Note: Due to a two-week break in publication over the 1989/1990 Christmas/New Year period, the week of 6 January is inferred.)	"Another Day in Paradise"	Phil Collins	
13 January	"Another Day in Paradise"	Phil Collins	
20 January	"Another Day in Paradise"	Phil Collins	
27 January	"Another Day in Paradise"	Phil Collins	
3 February	"Another Day in Paradise"	Phil Collins	
10 February	"Downtown Train"	Rod Stewart	
17 February	"Downtown Train"	Rod Stewart	
24 February	"Downtown Train"	Rod Stewart	
3 March	"Opposites Attract"	Paula Abdul and The Wild Pair	
10 March	"Opposites Attract"	Paula Abdul and The Wild Pair	
17 March	"Escapade"	Janet Jackson	
24 March	"I Wish It Would Rain Down"†	Phil Collins	
31 March	"I Wish It Would Rain Down"†	Phil Collins	
7 April	"I Wish It Would Rain Down"†	Phil Collins	
14 April	"I Wish It Would Rain Down"†	Phil Collins	
21 April	"I Wish It Would Rain Down"†	Phil Collins	
28 April	"I Wish It Would Rain Down"†	Phil Collins	
5 May	"Nothing Compares 2 U"	Sinéad O'Connor	
12 May	"Nothing Compares 2 U"	Sinéad O'Connor	
19 May	"Nothing Compares 2 U"	Sinéad O'Connor	
26 May	"Nothing Compares 2 U"	Sinéad O'Connor	
2 June	"Nothing Compares 2 U"	Sinéad O'Connor	
9 June	"All I Wanna Do Is Make Love to You"	Heart	
16 June	"Vogue"	Madonna	
23 June	"Vogue"	Madonna	
30 June	"Vogue"	Madonna	
7 July	"It Must Have Been Love"	Roxette	
14 July	"Do You Remember?"	Phil Collins	
21 July	"Step by Step"	New Kids on the Block	
28 July	"Step by Step"	New Kids on the Block	
4 August	"I'll Be Your Shelter"	Taylor Dayne	
11 August	"Across the River"	Bruce Hornsby and the Range	
18 August	"Across the River"	Bruce Hornsby and the Range	
25 August	"Vision of Love"	Mariah Carey	
1 September	"Vision of Love"	Mariah Carey	
8 September	"Vision of Love"	Mariah Carey	
15 September	"Vision of Love"	Mariah Carey	
22 September	"Release Me"	Wilson Phillips	
29 September	"Blaze of Glory"	Jon Bon Jovi	
6 October	"Blaze of Glory"	Jon Bon Jovi	
13 October	"Something Happened on the Way to Heaven"	Phil Collins	
20 October	"Something Happened on the Way to Heaven"	Phil Collins	
27 October	"Praying for Time"	George Michael	
3 November	"Praying for Time"	George Michael	
10 November	"Suicide Blonde"	INXS	
17 November	"Suicide Blonde"	INXS	
24 November	"More Than Words Can Say"	Alias	
1 December	"More Than Words Can Say"	Alias	
8 December	"More Than Words Can Say"	Alias	
15 December	"More Than Words Can Say"	Alias	
22 December	"Impulsive"	Wilson Phillips	
29 December (Note: Due to a two-week break in publication over the 1990/1991 Christmas/New Year period, the week of 29 December is inferred.)	"Impulsive"	Wilson Phillips	

== See also ==
- 1990 in music
- List of Canadian number-one albums of 1990
- List of Billboard Hot 100 number ones of 1990 (United States)
- List of number-one singles from the 1990s (New Zealand)
