= List of Canadian number-one albums of 1990 =

These are the Canadian number-one albums of 1990. The chart was compiled and published by RPM every Saturday.

Issue date	Album	Artist
January 13	...But Seriously	Phil Collins
January 20	...But Seriously	Phil Collins
January 27	...But Seriously	Phil Collins
February 3	...But Seriously	Phil Collins
February 10	...But Seriously	Phil Collins
February 17	...But Seriously	Phil Collins
February 24	Girl You Know It's True	Milli Vanilli
March 3	...But Seriously	Phil Collins
March 10	...But Seriously	Phil Collins
March 17	...But Seriously	Phil Collins
March 24	...But Seriously	Phil Collins
March 31	Forever Your Girl	Paula Abdul
April 7	Alannah Myles	Alannah Myles
April 14	Alannah Myles	Alannah Myles
April 21	I Do Not Want What I Haven't Got	Sinéad O'Connor
April 28	I Do Not Want What I Haven't Got	Sinéad O'Connor
May 5	I Do Not Want What I Haven't Got	Sinéad O'Connor
May 12	I Do Not Want What I Haven't Got	Sinéad O'Connor
May 19	I Do Not Want What I Haven't Got	Sinéad O'Connor
May 26	I Do Not Want What I Haven't Got	Sinéad O'Connor
June 2	I Do Not Want What I Haven't Got	Sinéad O'Connor
June 9	I Do Not Want What I Haven't Got	Sinéad O'Connor
June 16	I Do Not Want What I Haven't Got	Sinéad O'Connor
June 23	I Do Not Want What I Haven't Got	Sinéad O'Connor
June 30	I Do Not Want What I Haven't Got	Sinéad O'Connor
July 7	I Do Not Want What I Haven't Got	Sinéad O'Connor
July 14	I Do Not Want What I Haven't Got	Sinéad O'Connor
July 21	I Do Not Want What I Haven't Got	Sinéad O'Connor
July 28	I Do Not Want What I Haven't Got	Sinéad O'Connor
August 4	Step by Step	New Kids on the Block
August 11	Step by Step	New Kids on the Block
August 18	Please Hammer, Don't Hurt 'Em	MC Hammer
August 25	Please Hammer, Don't Hurt 'Em	MC Hammer
September 1	Please Hammer, Don't Hurt 'Em	MC Hammer
September 8	Wilson Phillips	Wilson Phillips
September 15	Wilson Phillips	Wilson Phillips
September 22	Wilson Phillips	Wilson Phillips
September 29	Wilson Phillips	Wilson Phillips
October 6	Please Hammer Don't Hurt 'Em	MC Hammer
October 13	Wilson Phillips	Wilson Phillips
October 20	Please Hammer Don't Hurt 'Em	MC Hammer
October 27	The Razors Edge	AC/DC
November 3	The Razors Edge	AC/DC
November 10	The Razors Edge	AC/DC
November 17	The Razors Edge	AC/DC
November 24	The Razors Edge	AC/DC
December 1	The Razors Edge	AC/DC
December 8	The Razors Edge	AC/DC
December 15	The Rhythm of the Saints	Paul Simon
December 22	The Rhythm of the Saints	Paul Simon

== See also ==
- List of Canadian number-one singles of 1990
