= Shadows and Light (Wilson Phillips album) =

Album by Wilson Phillips

Studio album by Wilson Phillips
- Released: June 2, 1992
- Recorded: 1991−92
- Studios: Westlake Audio (Hollywood, CA); Studio Ultimo (Los Angeles, CA); Capitol Studios (Hollywood, CA); Soundworks West (Hollywood, CA); Studio 56 (Hollywood, CA)
- Genre: Pop
- Length: 55:49
- Label: SBK
- Producer: Glen Ballard

Wilson Phillips chronology
Wilson Phillips (1990)	Shadows and Light (1992)	Greatest Hits (2000)

Singles from Shadows and Light
- 1. "You Won't See Me Cry" Released: April 28, 1992; 2. "Give It Up" Released: July 28, 1992; 3. "Flesh and Blood" Released: December 1992

Shadows and Light is the second studio album by the American vocal recording group Wilson Phillips, released on June 2, 1992, via SBK Records, a sublabel of EMI Records. The group worked again with Glen Ballard, who produced the record and co-wrote a majority of the tracks. A majority of the album was recorded in studios around Hollywood.

Named one of the biggest commercial disappointments of the year by The Vindicator, the album proved less successful than their debut studio album Wilson Phillips (1990), commercially. Although it peaked at number four on the US Billboard 200, it was only certified platinum by the RIAA, a far cry from the five-times platinum certification their debut album received. Internationally, the album cracked the top ten in Canada, Japan, Switzerland, and the United Kingdom. None of the album's three singles cracked the top ten in the United States, although the lead single "You Won't See Me Cry" did top Canada's RPM Top Singles chart. At the end of 1992, member Chynna Phillips decided to leave the group and as a result, they disbanded and would not re-unite until 2001.

== Background ==
Following their best-selling debut album Wilson Phillips, the trio enlisted the production again of Glen Ballard, who had also produced their debut.

The album's songs have a big contrast with the ones on their debut. While the majority of the songs on their debut album are upbeat with positive, lightweight lyrics, Shadows and Light features darker songwriting from the trio that deal with personal issues, such as the estrangement with their fathers ("Flesh and Blood", "All the Way from New York"), or child abuse ("Where Are You?").

The album received mixed reviews and, although a success peaking at number four in the United States and being certified Platinum, it was seen as a commercial failure elsewhere. Three singles were released from the album, and they had much less success than those featured on their debut. The ballad "You Won't See Me Cry" peaked at number 20 on the US Billboard Hot 100, the uptempo "Give It Up" peaked at number 30 and the final single, the ballad "Flesh and Blood" failed to reach the top 100 altogether, peaking at number 119. By the end of the year, Chynna Phillips left the band and the group disbanded for 12 years.

== Singles ==
"You Won't See Me Cry" was released as the album's lead single on April 28, 1992. Larry Flick of Billboard gave a favorable review of the track, calling it a "poignant power ballad that is etched with its distinctive harmonies and dramatic instrumentation." Its music video was directed by movie director Michael Bay, being added to MTV's playlists for the week of April 25, 1992, as an exclusive. It debuted on the Billboard Hot 100 the week of May 9, 1992, at number 96, rising quickly to peak position at No. 20. It spent 16 weeks on the chart and was the last top twenty hit of Wilson Phillips' career. Internationally, it topped the charts in Canada and Finland and top twenty in Switzerland and the UK. "Give It Up" was the second single taken from the album, released on July 27, 1992 in the United Kingdom. Flick from Billboard also reviewed this track and calling it a serious contender for top 40 and a/c radio domination. The track failed to enter the top ten in any country and was their first single to miss the top ten on Billboard's Adult Contemporary chart, stalling at number 12. It reached the top forty only in both the US and UK, their final charting single. "Flesh and Blood" was the third and final single, released in November 1992 exclusively to the US and the Netherlands. The song is sung by sibling members Carnie and Wendy Wilson and about their estrangement from their father, Brian Wilson of the Beach Boys. Larry Flick of Billboard also reviewed this track, naming it the best song off of Shadows and Light. A music video was directed by Lili Fini Zanuck in Los Angeles. It missed the US Billboard Hot 100, but did enter the charts in Canada and the Netherlands.

== Critical reception ==
Professional ratings
Review scores
Source	Rating
AllMusic	2.5/5 stars
Calgary Herald	C
Entertainment Weekly	A−
The Windsor Star	B+

Shadows and Light received a mixed to favorable reception from music critics. Ohioan newspaper Toledo Blade responded favorably to the album, singling out "Flesh and Blood" and "All the Way from New York" as the most powerful, persuasive, and personal songs on the record. They noted it as an album worth taking seriously. Jonathan Bernstein of SPIN magazine noted that the songs are executed "persuasively enough to convince you that if Jane Seymour, Lindsay Wagner, and Valerie Bertinelli ever formed a group, this is how they would sound." Bryan Buss of AllMusic reviewed it less favorably, rating it only a 2.5 out of 5, saying that while the group seemed to have good intentions, most of the material was not executed well and that they sounded "pretentious and condescending."

== Commercial performance ==
Shadows and Light debuted and peaked on the US Billboard 200 the week of June 20, 1992, at number four, behind albums by Billy Ray Cyrus, Kris Kross, and Red Hot Chili Peppers; Paul Grein of the publication noted that had the lead single "You Won't See Me Cry" peaked within the top ten of the Billboard Hot 100 as was expected, the album would've debuted higher. The album stayed in its peak position for another week before falling to number six on July 4, 1992. It spent four weeks in the top ten and 33 weeks overall on the chart. It was certified Platinum by the RIAA for shipments of one million copies.

== Track listing ==
All tracks are written by Wilson Phillips and Glen Ballard, except where noted.

No.	Title	Writer(s)	Lead vocals	Length
1.	"I Hear You" (Prelude)	Carnie Wilson		0:53
2.	"It's Only Life"	Wilson Phillips; Bob Marlette	Chynna Phillips	5:24
3.	"You Won't See Me Cry"		Carnie Wilson and Chynna Phillips	3:53
4.	"Give It Up"		Wendy Wilson	4:51
5.	"This Doesn't Have to Be Love"		Carnie Wilson	4:40
6.	"Where Are You?"	Phillips; Ballard	Chynna Phillips	5:24
7.	"Flesh and Blood"		Carnie Wilson and Wendy Wilson	5:35
8.	"Don't Take Me Down"	Wilson Phillips; Marlette	Wendy Wilson	4:43
9.	"All the Way from New York"	Phillips	Chynna Phillips	3:37
10.	"Fueled for Houston"		Carnie Wilson	4:15
11.	"Goodbye, Carmen"		Carnie Wilson and Chynna Phillips	5:17
12.	"Alone"	W. Wilson	Wendy Wilson	5:17
13.	"I Hear You" (Reprise)	C. Wilson	Wilson Phillips	2:06
Total length:				55:49

Japanese release bonus track
No.	Title	Writer(s)	Lead vocals	Length
14.	"Daniel" (Elton John cover)	Elton John; Bernie Taupin	Wilson Phillips	4:02
Total length:				60:06

== Personnel ==
Wilson Phillips

- Chynna Phillips – lead vocals (2, 3, 6, 9, 11, 13), backing vocals
- Carnie Wilson – lead vocals (3, 5, 7, 10, 11, 13), backing vocals, tambourine (8), acoustic piano (13)
- Wendy Wilson – lead vocals (4, 7, 8, 12, 13), backing vocals
  - Vocal arrangements by Glen Ballard and Wilson Phillips.

Musicians

- Robbie Buchanan – synthesizers (2, 8), bass (2)
- Bob Marlette – synthesizers (2, 8), bass (2)
- Greg Phillinganes – acoustic piano (3, 10, 11), bass (3)
- Randy Kerber – synthesizers (3, 5, 7, 9, 10), acoustic piano (5–7, 9), organ (7, 8, 10)
- Glen Ballard – additional synthesizers (3, 5, 7, 9, 10), synthesizers (4, 6, 11–13), bass (4), handclaps (4)
- Michael Landau – guitars (2, 3, 5–9, 11, 12)
- Steve Lukather – guitars (3, 9)
- Basil Fung – guitars (3, 10)
- James Harrah – guitars (4)
- Michael Thompson – guitars (4)
- Leland Sklar – bass (5, 9)
- Neil Stubenhaus – bass (6–8, 10–12)
- John Robinson – drums (2, 3, 5–12)
- Chris Fogel – handclaps (4)
- Jen Dickenson – handclaps (4)
- Paulinho da Costa – percussion (8, 12)
- Dan Higgins – saxophones (1, 4, 10)
- Kim Hutchcroft – saxophones (1, 4, 10)
- Marc Russo – saxophone (3)
- Gary Grant – trumpet (1, 4, 10)
- Jerry Hey – trumpet (1, 4, 10), horn arrangements (1, 4, 10), string arrangements (3, 9, 11)
- Joshua Trossman – harmonica (10)
- Clayton Haslop – concertmaster (3, 9, 11)
- Christine Ermacoff, Todd Hemmenway and Dennis Karmazyn – cello (3, 9, 11)
- Chuck Domanico and Kenneth Wild – upright bass (3, 9, 11)
- Brian Dembow, Roland Kato, Marlow Fisher and Michael Nowak – viola (3, 9, 11)
- Richard Altenbach, Lily Chen, Ronald Folsom, Reg Hill, Karen Jones, Leslie Katz, Ralph Morrison, Helen Nightengale, Claudia Parducci and Mari Tsumura Botnick – violin (3, 9, 11)
- Horn and string charts prepared by Orion Crawford; Additional preparation by Doug Dana and Jim Surell

== Production ==
- Executive producer – Charles Koppelman
- Produced by Glen Ballard
- Recorded, engineered and mixed by Francis Buckley
- Additional recording by Ted Blaisdell and Julie Last
- Assistant engineers – Tom Biener, Jon Dickinson, Peter Doell, Jon Fundings, Thomas Hardisti, Jusy Kirschner and Charlie Paakkari.
- Technical direction by Chris Fogel and Steve Harrison
- Mastered by Chris Bellman at Bernie Grundman Mastering (Hollywood, CA).
- Management – Howard Kaufman and Trudy Green

Additional Credits

- Production coordinator – Jolie Levine
- Art direction – Henry Marquez and Margo Chase Design
- Cover photography – Herb Ritts
- Still life photography – Sydney Cooper

== Charts and certifications ==
=== Weekly charts ===
Chart (1992)	Peak position
Australian Albums (ARIA)	30
Austrian Albums (Ö3 Austria)	34
Canada Top Albums/CDs (RPM)	8
Dutch Albums (Album Top 100)	59
German Albums (Offizielle Top 100)	13
Japanese Albums (Oricon)	9
New Zealand Albums (RMNZ)	19
Norwegian Albums (VG-lista)	18
Swedish Albums (Sverigetopplistan)	20
Swiss Albums (Schweizer Hitparade)	3
UK Albums (Official Charts)	6
US Billboard 200	4

=== Year-end charts ===
Chart (1992)	Position
Canada Top Albums/CDs (RPM)	47
German Albums (Offizielle Top 100)	91
Swiss Albums (Schweizer Hitparade)	30
US Billboard 200	76

=== Certifications ===
Certifications for Shadows and Light
Region	Certification	Certified units/sales
Canada (Music Canada)	2× Platinum	200,000^{^}
Switzerland (IFPI Switzerland)	Gold	25,000^{^}
United Kingdom (BPI)	Silver	60,000^{^}
United States (RIAA)	Platinum	1,000,000^{^}
^{^} Shipments figures based on certification alone.
