= You're in Love (Wilson Phillips song) =

1991 single by Wilson Phillips

Single by Wilson Phillips

from the album Wilson Phillips
- B-side: "Hold On" (live); "Release Me" (live); "Morning Tea in Tokyo"
- Released: January 30, 1991
- Genre: Pop; soft rock
- Length: 3:59 (radio version); 4:35 (main version)
- Label: SBK
- Songwriters: Glen Ballard; Wilson Phillips
- Producer: Glen Ballard

Wilson Phillips singles chronology
"Impulsive" (1990)	"You're in Love" (1991)	"The Dream Is Still Alive" (1991)

"You're in Love" is a song by American pop rock band Wilson Phillips. It was written by the band with Glen Ballard, while he produced it. Released in January 1991 by SBK Records as the fourth single released from the group's self-titled debut album (1990), it reached number one on the US Billboard Hot 100, becoming the group's third and final number-one single in the United States. At the 34th Annual Grammy Awards, it received a nomination for Best Pop Vocal Performance by a Duo or Group.

== Chart performance ==
"You're in Love" reached number one on the US Billboard Hot 100 for the week ending April 20, 1991; it was their third number-one hit and fourth top-five single. It also spent four weeks atop the Hot Adult Contemporary Tracks in 1991, the group's longest stay at number on this chart. In Canada, the song reached number three on the RPM 100 Hit Tracks chart and also became an adult contemporary number-one hit, spending two weeks atop the RPM 40AC chart. Outside North America, the single failed the replicate the success of the band's previous singles, reaching number 29 on the UK Singles Chart and missing the top 30 in both Belgium and the Netherlands.

== Track listings ==
- US maxi-CD single
1. "You're in Love" (radio edit) – 3:59
2. "You're in Love" – 4:35
3. "Hold On" (live in Japan) – 4:43
4. "Release Me" (live in Japan) – 4:38
5. "Morning Tea in Tokyo: A Conversation with Wilson Phillips" – 1:46
- US cassette single
1. "You're in Love" (radio edit) – 3:59
2. "Hold On" (live in Japan) – 4:43
3. "Release Me" (live in Japan) – 4:38
4. "Morning Tea in Tokyo: A Conversation with Wilson Phillips" – 1:46
- UK cassette single
1. "You're in Love" (radio edit) – 3:59
2. "Hold On" (live in Japan) – 4:43
- UK CD single
1. "You're in Love" (radio edit) – 3:59
2. "Hold On" (live in Japan) – 4:43
3. "Release Me" (live in Japan) – 4:38
4. "You're in Love" (album remix) – 4:35
- European 12-inch single

A1. "You're in Love" (album remix) – 4:34
B1. "Hold On" (live in Japan) – 4:42
B2. "Release Me" (live in Japan) – 4:36

- Japanese mini-CD single
1. "You're in Love"
2. "Ooh You're Gold"

== Charts ==
=== Weekly charts ===
Chart (1991)	Peak position
Belgium (Ultratop 50 Flanders)	31
Canada Top Singles (RPM)	3
Canada Adult Contemporary (RPM)	1
Europe (Eurochart Hot 100)	66
Europe (European Hit Radio)	11
Germany (GfK)	54
Ireland (IRMA)	24
Netherlands (Dutch Top 40 Tipparade)	7
Netherlands (Single Top 100)	32
UK Singles (Official Charts)	29
UK Airplay (Music Week)	4
US Billboard Hot 100	1
US Adult Contemporary (Billboard)	1
US Cash Box Top 100	3

=== Year-end charts ===
Chart (1991)	Position
Canada Top Singles (RPM)	20
Canada Adult Contemporary (RPM)	30
Europe (European Hit Radio)	65
US Billboard Hot 100	27
US Adult Contemporary (Billboard)	6
US Cash Box Top 100	26

== Release history ==
Region	Date	Format(s)	Label(s)	Ref.
United States	January 30, 1991	Maxi-CD; cassette	SBK	
Australia	March 25, 1991	7-inch vinyl; cassette	SBK	
Japan	April 12, 1991	Mini-CD	SBK	
United Kingdom	April 29, 1991	7-inch vinyl; 12-inch vinyl; CD; cassette	SBK	
