= American Music Award for Favorite Country Single =

Music industry award

The American Music Award for Favorite Country Single is a major music industry award that was created in 1974. However, the award was discontinued after 1995.

Years reflect the year in which the American Music Awards were presented, for works released in the previous year.

The all-time winner of awards in this category was Kenny Rogers. Rogers won a total of 5 AMA Favorite Country Single trophies, two of which were shared as part of a duet with Dolly Parton.

== Winners and nominees ==
=== American Music Award for Favorite Pop/Rock Video ===
Year	Artist	Video	Ref
1984 (11th)
1984 (11th)	Michael Jackson	"Beat It"	
1984 (11th)	Billy Joel	"Tell Her About It"	
1984 (11th)	Michael Jackson	"Billie Jean"	
1985 (12th)
1985 (12th)	Lionel Richie	"Hello"	
1985 (12th)	Prince	"When Doves Cry"	
1985 (12th)	Ray Parker Jr.	"Ghostbusters"	
1986 (13th)
1986 (13th)	Huey Lewis and the News	"The Power of Love"	
1986 (13th)	A-ha	"Take On Me"	
1986 (13th)	Philip Bailey and Phil Collins	"Easy Lover"	
1987 (14th)
1987 (14th)	Lionel Richie	"Dancing on the Ceiling"	
1987 (14th)	Belinda Carlisle	"Mad About You"	
1987 (14th)	Janet Jackson	"When I Think of You"	
1987 (14th)	Robert Palmer	"I Didn't Mean to Turn You On"	
1988 (15th)
1988 (15th)	Janet Jackson	"When I Think of You"	
1988 (15th)	Peter Gabriel	"Sledgehammer"	
1988 (15th)	Robert Palmer	"I Didn't Mean to Turn You On"	

=== American Music Award for Favorite Pop/Rock Male Video Artist ===
Year	Artist	Ref
1985 (12th)
1985 (12th)	Lionel Richie	
1985 (12th)	Bruce Springsteen	
1985 (12th)	Prince	
1986 (13th)
1986 (13th)	Bruce Springsteen	
1986 (13th)	Huey Lewis	
1986 (13th)	Phil Collins	
1987 (14th)
1987 (14th)	Billy Ocean	
1987 (14th)	Howard Jones	
1987 (14th)	Peter Gabriel	
1987 (14th)	Robert Palmer	

=== American Music Award for Favorite Pop/Rock Female Video Artist ===
Year	Artist	Ref
1985 (12th)
1985 (12th)	Cyndi Lauper	
1985 (12th)	Laura Branigan	
1985 (12th)	Tina Turner	
1986 (13th)
1986 (13th)	Pat Benatar	
1986 (13th)	Aretha Franklin	
1986 (13th)	Madonna	
1987 (14th)
1987 (14th)	Madonna	
1987 (14th)	Belinda Carlisle	
1987 (14th)	Janet Jackson	
1987 (14th)	Whitney Houston	

=== American Music Award for Favorite Pop/Rock Band/Duo/Group Video Artist ===
Year	Artist	Ref
1985 (12th)
1985 (12th)	Huey Lewis and the News	
1985 (12th)	Culture Club	
1985 (12th)	Duran Duran	
1986 (13th)
1986 (13th)	Wham!	
1986 (13th)	Eurythmics	
1986 (13th)	Tears for Fears	
1987 (14th)
1987 (14th)	Huey Lewis and the News	
1987 (14th)	Culture Club	
1987 (14th)	Run-DMC	
1987 (14th)	Simple Minds	

=== American Music Award for Favorite Pop/Rock New Artist ===
Year	Artist	Ref
1989 (16th)
1989 (16th)	Tracy Chapman	
1989 (16th)	Rick Astley	
1989 (16th)	Taylor Dayne	
1990 (17th)
1990 (17th)	Milli Vanilli	
1990 (17th)	Living Colour	
1990 (17th)	Traveling Wilburys	
1991 (18th)
1991 (18th)	Vanilla Ice	
1991 (18th)	Mariah Carey	
1991 (18th)	Wilson Phillips	
1992 (19th)
1992 (19th)	C+C Music Factory	
1992 (19th)	Boyz II Men	
1992 (19th)	Color Me Badd	
1993 (20th)
1993 (20th)	Pearl Jam	
1993 (20th)	Arrested Development	
1993 (20th)	TLC	
1994 (21st)
1994 (21st)	Stone Temple Pilots	
1994 (21st)	Blind Melon	
1994 (21st)	SWV	
1995 (22nd)
1995 (22nd)	Ace of Base	
1995 (22nd)	All-4-One	
1995 (22nd)	Counting Crows	
1996 (23rd)
1996 (23rd)	Hootie & the Blowfish	
1996 (23rd)	Alanis Morissette	
1996 (23rd)	Blues Traveler	
1997 (24th)
1997 (24th)	Jewel	
1997 (24th)	Donna Lewis	
1997 (24th)	No Doubt	
1998 (25th)
1998 (25th)	Spice Girls	
1998 (25th)	Matchbox Twenty	
1998 (25th)	The Wallflowers	
1999 (26th)
1999 (26th)	NSYNC	
1999 (26th)	Natalie Imbruglia	
1999 (26th)	Third Eye Blind	
2000 (27th)
2000 (27th)	Britney Spears	
2000 (27th)	Jennifer Lopez	
2000 (27th)	Kid Rock	
2001 (28th)
2001 (28th)	3 Doors Down	
2001 (28th)	Jessica Simpson	
2001 (28th)	Macy Gray	
2002 (29th)
2002 (29th)	Alicia Keys	
2002 (29th)	Lifehouse	
2002 (29th)	Nelly Furtado	
2003 (30th)
2003 (30th)	Ashanti	
2003 (30th)	Kelly Clarkson	
2003 (30th)	Puddle of Mudd	

=== American Music Award for Favorite Country Video ===
- Two-time nominees: Alabama, Hank Williams Jr., Reba McEntire and Willie Nelson

Year	Artist	Video	Ref
1984 (11th)
1984 (11th)	Alabama	"Dixieland Delight"	
1984 (11th)	Dolly Parton	"Potential New Boyfriend"	
1984 (11th)	Merle Haggard and Willie Nelson	"Pancho and Lefty"	
1985 (12th)
1985 (12th)	Anne Murray	"A Little Good News"	
1985 (12th)	The Statler Brothers	"Elizabeth"	
1985 (12th)	Willie Nelson	"Tougher Than Leather"	
1986 (13th)
1986 (13th)	The Highwaymen	"Highwayman"	
1986 (13th)	Alabama	"40 Hour Week (For a Livin')"	
1986 (13th)	Hank Williams Jr.	"All My Rowdy Friends Are Coming Over Tonight"	
1987 (14th)
1987 (14th)	The Judds	"Grandpa (Tell Me 'Bout the Good Ol' Days)"	
1987 (14th)	Dwight Yoakam	"Honky-Tonk Man"	
1987 (14th)	George Jones	"Who's Gonna Fill Their Shoes"	
1987 (14th)	Reba McEntire	"Whoever's in New England"	
1988 (15th)
1988 (15th)	Randy Travis	"Forever and Ever, Amen"	
1988 (15th)	Hank Williams Jr.	"My Name Is Bocephus"	
1988 (15th)	Reba McEntire	"What Am I Gonna Do About You"	

=== American Music Award for Favorite Country Male Video Artist ===
- Two-time nominees: Hank Williams Jr.

Year	Artist	Ref
1985 (12th)
1985 (12th)	Willie Nelson	
1985 (12th)	Hank Williams Jr.	
1985 (12th)	Waylon Jennings	
1986 (13th)
1986 (13th)	Hank Williams Jr.	
1986 (13th)	Lee Greenwood	
1986 (13th)	Ricky Skaggs	
1987 (14th)
1987 (14th)	George Jones	
1987 (14th)	Gary Morris	
1987 (14th)	George Strait	
1987 (14th)	Mel McDaniel	

=== American Music Award for Favorite Country Female Video Artist ===
- Three-time nominees: Anne Murray
- Two-time nominees: Janie Fricke

Year	Artist	Ref
1985 (12th)
1985 (12th)	Anne Murray	
1985 (12th)	Charly McClain	
1985 (12th)	Gus Hardin	
1986 (13th)
1986 (13th)	Crystal Gayle	
1986 (13th)	Anne Murray	
1986 (13th)	Janie Fricke	
1987 (14th)
1987 (14th)	Reba McEntire	
1987 (14th)	Anne Murray	
1987 (14th)	Janie Fricke	
1987 (14th)	Marie Osmond	

=== American Music Award for Favorite Country Band/Duo/Group Video Artist ===
- Two-time nominees: Alabama and The Oak Ridge Boys

Year	Artist	Ref
1985 (12th)
1985 (12th)	The Oak Ridge Boys	
1985 (12th)	The Statler Brothers	
1985 (12th)	Waylon Jennings and Hank Williams Jr.	
1986 (13th)
1986 (13th)	The Highwaymen	
1986 (13th)	Alabama	
1986 (13th)	The Oak Ridge Boys	
1987 (14th)
1987 (14th)	Alabama	
1987 (14th)	The Forester Sisters	
1987 (14th)	The Judds	
1987 (14th)	Sawyer Brown	

=== American Music Award for Favorite Soul/R&B Video ===
Year	Artist	Video	Ref
1984 (11th)
1984 (11th)	Michael Jackson	"Beat It"	
1984 (11th)	Donna Summer	"She Works Hard for the Money"	
1984 (11th)	Michael Jackson	"Billie Jean"	
1985 (12th)
1985 (12th)	Lionel Richie	"Hello"	
1985 (12th)	Prince	"When Doves Cry"	
1985 (12th)	Ray Parker Jr.	"Ghostbusters"	
1986 (13th)
1986 (13th)	Whitney Houston	"Saving All My Love for You"	
1986 (13th)	Aretha Franklin	"Freeway of Love"	
1986 (13th)	Ready for the World	"Oh Sheila"	
1987 (14th)
1987 (14th)	Whitney Houston	"The Greatest Love of All"	
1987 (14th)	Billy Ocean	"There'll Be Sad Songs (To Make You Cry)"	
1987 (14th)	Janet Jackson	"When I Think of You"	
1987 (14th)	Run-DMC	"Walk This Way"	
1988 (15th)
1988 (15th)	Janet Jackson	"When I Think of You"	
1988 (15th)	Peter Gabriel	"Sledgehammer"	
1988 (15th)	Robert Palmer	"I Didn't Mean to Turn You On"	

=== American Music Award for Favorite Soul/R&B Male Video Artist ===
Year	Artist	Ref
1985 (12th)
1985 (12th)	Lionel Richie	
1985 (12th)	Prince	
1985 (12th)	Ray Parker Jr.	
1986 (13th)
1986 (13th)	Stevie Wonder	
1986 (13th)	Philip Bailey and Phil Collins	
1986 (13th)	Prince	
1987 (14th)
1987 (14th)	Lionel Richie	
1987 (14th)	Billy Ocean	
1987 (14th)	James Brown	
1987 (14th)	Oran "Juice" Jones	

=== American Music Award for Favorite Soul/R&B Female Video Artist ===
Year	Artist	Ref
1985 (12th)
1985 (12th)	Tina Turner	
1985 (12th)	Chaka Khan	
1985 (12th)	Sheila E.	
1986 (13th)
1986 (13th)	Aretha Franklin	
1986 (13th)	Sade	
1986 (13th)	Whitney Houston	
1987 (14th)
1987 (14th)	Janet Jackson	
1987 (14th)	Aretha Franklin	
1987 (14th)	Tina Turner	
1987 (14th)	Whitney Houston	

=== American Music Award for Favorite Soul/R&B Band/Duo/Group Video Artist ===
Year	Artist	Ref
1985 (12th)
1985 (12th)	The Pointer Sisters	
1985 (12th)	Kool & the Gang	
1985 (12th)	The Time	
1986 (13th)
1986 (13th)	The Pointer Sisters	
1986 (13th)	Ashford & Simpson	
1986 (13th)	Kool & the Gang	
1987 (14th)
1987 (14th)	Kool & the Gang	
1987 (14th)	Cameo	
1987 (14th)	The Jets	
1987 (14th)	Run-DMC	

=== American Music Award for Favorite Soul/R&B New Artist ===
Year	Artist	Ref
1989 (16th)
1989 (16th)	Al B. Sure!	
1989 (16th)	Karyn White	
1989 (16th)	Tony! Toni! Tone!	
1990 (17th)
1990 (17th)	Milli Vanilli	
1990 (17th)	Babyface (musician)	
1990 (17th)	Soul II Soul	
1991 (18th)
1991 (18th)	Bell Biv DeVoe	
1991 (18th)	Johnny Gill	
1991 (18th)	Lisa Stansfield	
1992 (19th)
1992 (19th)	Boyz II Men	
1992 (19th)	Color Me Badd	
1992 (19th)	Hi-Five	
1993 (20th)
1993 (20th)	Kris Kross	
1993 (20th)	Arrested Development	
1993 (20th)	Jodeci	
1994 (21st)
1994 (21st)	Toni Braxton	
1994 (21st)	Silk	
1994 (21st)	SWV	
1995 (22nd)
1995 (22nd)	All-4-One	
1995 (22nd)	Aaliyah	
1995 (22nd)	Warren G	
1996 (23rd)
1996 (23rd)	Brandy Norwood	
1996 (23rd)	Monica	
1996 (23rd)	Soul for Real	
1997 (24th)
1997 (24th)	D'Angelo	
1997 (24th)	Deborah Cox	
1997 (24th)	Tony Rich	
1998 (25th)
1998 (25th)	Erykah Badu	
1998 (25th)	Dru Hill	
1998 (25th)	Sean Combs	
1999 (26th)
1999 (26th)	Lauryn Hill	
1999 (26th)	LSG	
1999 (26th)	Next	
2000 (27th)
2000 (27th)	Tyrese Gibson	
2000 (27th)	702	
2000 (27th)	Eve	
2001 (28th)
2001 (28th)	Donell Jones	
2001 (28th)	Mary Mary	
2001 (28th)	Pink	
2002 (29th)
2002 (29th)	Alicia Keys	
2002 (29th)	Blu Cantrell	
2002 (29th)	Musiq Soulchild	
2003 (30th)
2003 (30th)	Ashanti	
2003 (30th)	B2K	
2003 (30th)	Nappy Roots	

=== American Music Award for Favorite Heavy Metal/Hard Rock Artist ===
Year	Artist	Ref
1989 (16th)
1989 (16th)	Def Leppard	
1989 (16th)	Guns N' Roses	
1989 (16th)	Van Halen	
1990 (17th)
1990 (17th)	Guns N' Roses	
1990 (17th)	Aerosmith	
1990 (17th)	Mötley Crüe	
1991 (18th)
1991 (18th)	Aerosmith	
1991 (18th)	Mötley Crüe	
1991 (18th)	Poison	
1992 (19th)
1992 (19th)	Guns N' Roses	
1992 (19th)	Metallica	
1992 (19th)	Van Halen	
1993 (20th)
1993 (20th)	Metallica	
1993 (20th)	Def Leppard	
1993 (20th)	Red Hot Chili Peppers	
1994 (21st)
1994 (21st)	Aerosmith	
1994 (21st)	Metallica	
1994 (21st)	Pearl Jam	
1995 (22nd)
1995 (22nd)	Nirvana	
1995 (22nd)	Pearl Jam	
1995 (22nd)	Stone Temple Pilots	
1996 (23rd)
1996 (23rd)	Pearl Jam	
1996 (23rd)	Green Day	
1996 (23rd)	Van Halen	
1997 (24th)
1997 (24th)	Metallica	
1997 (24th)	The Smashing Pumpkins	
1997 (24th)	Stone Temple Pilots	

=== American Music Award for Favorite Heavy Metal/Hard Rock Album ===
Year	Artist	Album	Ref
1989 (16th)
1989 (16th)	Def Leppard	Hysteria	
1989 (16th)	Guns N' Roses	Appetite for Destruction	
1989 (16th)	Van Halen	OU812	
1990 (17th)
1990 (17th)	Guns N' Roses	Appetite for Destruction	
1990 (17th)	Mötley Crüe	Dr. Feelgood	
1990 (17th)	Skid Row	Skid Row	
1991 (18th)
1991 (18th)	Mötley Crüe	Dr. Feelgood	
1991 (18th)	Aerosmith	Pump	
1991 (18th)	Poison	Flesh & Blood	
1992 (19th)
1992 (19th)	Van Halen	For Unlawful Carnal Knowledge	
1992 (19th)	Guns N' Roses	Use Your Illusion I	
1992 (19th)	Metallica	Metallica	

=== American Music Award for Favorite Heavy Metal/Hard Rock New Artist ===
Year	Artist	Ref
1990 (17th)
1990 (17th)	Skid Row	
1990 (17th)	Warrant	
1990 (17th)	Winger	
1991 (18th)
1991 (18th)	Slaughter	
1991 (18th)	Bruce Dickinson	
1991 (18th)	Don Dokken	
1992 (19th)
1992 (19th)	FireHouse	
1992 (19th)	Alice in Chains	
1992 (19th)	Nirvana	
1993 (20th)
1993 (20th)	Pearl Jam	
1993 (20th)	Mr. Big	
1993 (20th)	Ugly Kid Joe	

=== American Music Award for Favorite Rap/Hip-Hop New Artist ===
Year	Artist	Ref
1990 (17th)
1990 (17th)	Young MC	
1990 (17th)	Eazy-E	
1990 (17th)	Tone Loc	
1991 (18th)
1991 (18th)	Vanilla Ice	
1991 (18th)	Candyman	
1991 (18th)	Digital Underground	
1992 (19th)
1992 (19th)	Naughty by Nature	
1992 (19th)	DJ Quik	
1992 (19th)	Marky Mark and the Funky Bunch	
1993 (20th)
1993 (20th)	Kris Kross	
1993 (20th)	Arrested Development	
1993 (20th)	TLC	
1994 (21st)
1994 (21st)	Dr. Dre	
1994 (21st)	Arrested Development	
1994 (21st)	Naughty by Nature	

=== American Music Award for Favorite Dance Artist ===
Year	Artist	Ref
1990 (17th)
1990 (17th)	Paula Abdul	
1990 (17th)	Bobby Brown	
1990 (17th)	Janet Jackson	
1991 (18th)
1991 (18th)	Janet Jackson	
1991 (18th)	Madonna	
1991 (18th)	Michel'le	
1992 (19th)
1992 (19th)	C+C Music Factory	
1992 (19th)	Crystal Waters	
1992 (19th)	Madonna	

=== American Music Award for Favorite Dance Song ===
Year	Artist	Song	Ref
1990 (17th)
1990 (17th)	Janet Jackson	"Miss You Much"	
1990 (17th)	Madonna	"Like a Prayer"	
1990 (17th)	Soul II Soul	"Back to Life (However Do You Want Me)"	
1991 (18th)
1991 (18th)	Madonna	"Vogue"	
1991 (18th)	En Vogue	"Hold On"	
1991 (18th)	Snap!	"The Power"	
1992 (19th)
1992 (19th)	C+C Music Factory	"Gonna Make You Sweat (Everybody Dance Now)"	
1992 (19th)	Crystal Waters	"Gypsy Woman"	
1992 (19th)	Mariah Carey	"Someday"	

=== American Music Award for Favorite Dance New Artist ===
Year	Artist	Ref
1990 (17th)
1990 (17th)	Tone Loc	
1990 (17th)	De La Soul	
1990 (17th)	Soul II Soul	
1991 (18th)
1991 (18th)	Bell Biv DeVoe	
1991 (18th)	En Vogue	
1991 (18th)	Michel'le	
1992 (19th)
1992 (19th)	C+C Music Factory	
1992 (19th)	Crystal Waters	
1992 (19th)	The KLF	
