= Charlie Rich =

American country singer (1932–1995)

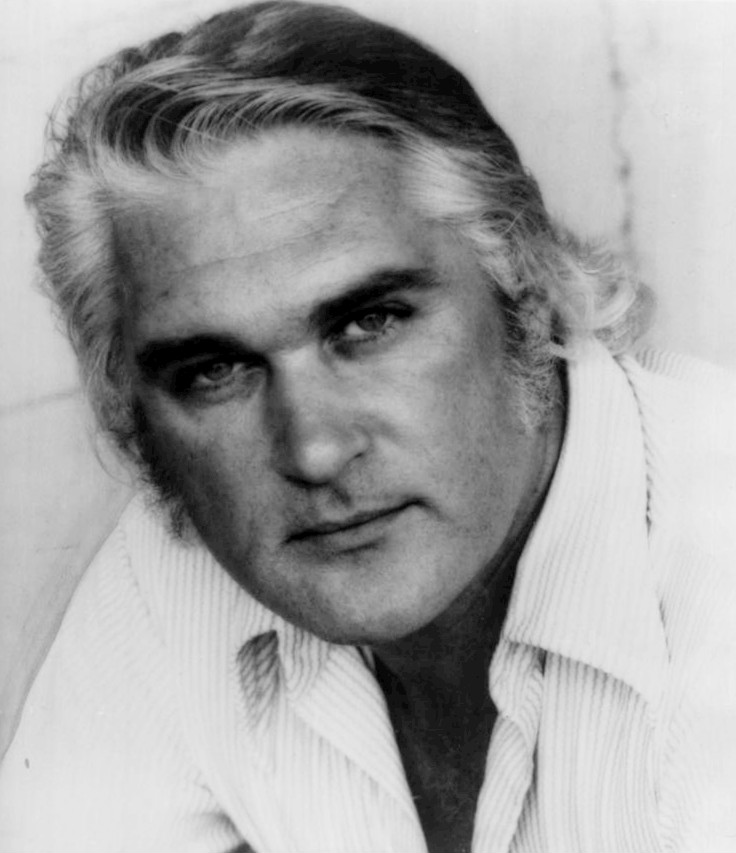
- Rich in 1973

Background information
- Also known as: Silver Fox
- Born: Charles Allan Rich; December 14, 1932; Colt, Arkansas, U.S.
- Died: July 25, 1995 (aged 62) Hammond, Louisiana, U.S.
- Genres: Country; rockabilly; jazz; countrypolitan
- Occupation: Singer-songwriter
- Instruments: Vocals, piano, guitar
- Years active: 1958–1995
- Labels: Sun, Phillips, Groove / RCA, Smash Records, Hi Records, Epic, UA, Elektra, Sire
- Website: charlierich.com

Charles Allan Rich (December 14, 1932 – July 25, 1995) was an American country singer. His eclectic style of music also blended influences from rockabilly, jazz, blues, soul, and gospel.

In the later part of his life, Rich acquired the nickname the Silver Fox. He is perhaps best remembered for a pair of 1973 hits, "Behind Closed Doors" and "The Most Beautiful Girl", which topped the U.S. country singles charts as well as the Billboard Hot 100 pop singles charts and earned him two Grammy Awards. Rich was inducted into the Memphis Music Hall of Fame in 2015. In 2023, Rolling Stone ranked Rich at No. 120 on its list of the 200 Greatest Singers of All Time.

== Early life ==
Rich was born in Colt, Arkansas, to rural cotton farmers. He graduated from Consolidated High School in Forrest City, where he played saxophone in the band. He was strongly influenced by his parents, who were members of the Landmark Missionary Baptist Church; his mother, Helen Rich, played piano in church and his father sang in gospel quartets. A black sharecropper on the family land named C. J. Allen taught Rich blues piano. He enrolled at Arkansas State College on a football scholarship and then after an injury, transferred to the University of Arkansas as a music major. He left after one semester to join the United States Air Force in 1953.

He married Margaret Ann Greene in 1952. While stationed in Enid, Oklahoma, he formed "the Velvetones", playing jazz and blues and featuring his wife on vocals. When he left the military in 1956, the couple returned to the West Memphis area to farm 500 acres. He also began performing in clubs around the Memphis area, playing both jazz and R&B, and began writing his own material.

== Career ==
=== Early years ===
After recording some demonstration songs for Sam Phillips at Sun Records that Phillips considered "too jazzy" and insufficiently commercial, Rich was given a stack of Jerry Lee Lewis records and told: "Come back when you get that bad." In a 1992 interview with Fresh Air host Terry Gross, Rich himself recalled Bill Justis telling Rich's wife those words.

In 1958, Rich became a regular session musician for Sun Records, playing on a variety of records by Lewis, Johnny Cash, Bill Justis, Warren Smith, Billy Lee Riley, Carl Mann, and Ray Smith. He also wrote several songs for Lewis, Cash, and others.

After he began recording for the Sun subsidiary Phillips International Records, his third single was the 1960 Top 30 hit "Lonely Weekends", with Presley-like vocals. It sold more than one million copies and was awarded a gold disc by the Recording Industry Association of America. None of his seven follow-up singles was a success, however, though several of the songs became staples in his live set, including "Who Will the Next Fool Be", "Sittin' and Thinkin'", and "No Headstone on My Grave". These songs were often recorded by others to varying degrees of success, such as the Bobby Bland version of "Who Will the Next Fool Be".

"Rich's jazzy chops and heartfelt polish transform Nashville's best chicken fat into high-quality mainstream pop—Arkansas's answer to Nat Cole. Cole was better at it, but I prefer Rich's homely subject matter and rock and roll roots."

— Christgau's Record Guide: Rock Albums of the Seventies (1981)

Rich's career stalled, and he left the struggling Sun label in 1963, signing with Groove, a subsidiary of RCA Victor. His first single for Groove, "Big Boss Man", was a minor hit, but once again, his Chet Atkins-produced follow-up records all failed. In 1965 he moved to Smash Records, where his new producer, Jerry Kennedy, encouraged him to emphasize his country and rock n' roll leanings, although Rich considered himself a jazz pianist and had not paid much attention to country music since childhood. His first single for Smash was "Mohair Sam", an R&B-inflected novelty-rock number written by Dallas Frazier, which became a Top 30 pop hit. It has been mentioned in thousands of articles as the song Elvis Presley played repetitiously on his jukebox during the Beatles' visit to his home on August 26, 1965. However, once more none of his follow-up singles were successful. Rich again changed labels, moving to Hi Records, where he recorded blue-eyed soul music and straight country, but none of his singles for Hi made a dent on the country or pop charts. One Hi Records track, "Love Is After Me" (1966), belatedly became a white soul favorite in the early 1970s.

=== Career peak in the 1970s ===
Despite his lack of consistent commercial success, Epic Records signed Rich in 1967, mainly on the recommendation of producer Billy Sherrill. Sherrill helped Rich refashion himself as a Nashville sound balladeer during an era when old rock 'n' roll artists like Jerry Lee Lewis and Conway Twitty were finding a new musical home in the country format. This new "countrypolitan" Rich sound paid off in the summer of 1972, when "I Take It on Home" went to No. 6 on the country charts. The title track from his 1973 album Behind Closed Doors became a No. 1 country hit early in that year, then crossed over into the Top 20 on the pop charts. This time, his follow-up single did not disappoint, as "The Most Beautiful Girl" spent three weeks at the top of the country charts and two weeks at the top of the pop charts. Now that he was established as a country music star, Behind Closed Doors won three awards from the Country Music Association that year: Best Male Vocalist, Album of the Year, and Single of the Year. The album was also certified gold. Rich won a Grammy Award for Best Male Country Vocal Performance, and he took home four Academy of Country Music awards. One of RCA Victor's several resident songwriters, Marvin Walters, co-wrote for three years with Rich, producing four recordings including the popular "Set Me Free". Also, in 1973 Charlie Rich was featured artist & sang "A Man Gets to Thinkin" in the John Wayne movie entitled Cahill: United States Marshal.

After "The Most Beautiful Girl", No. 1 hits came quickly, with five songs topping the country charts in 1974 and crossing over to the pop charts: "There Won't Be Anymore" (pop No. 18), "A Very Special Love Song" (pop No. 11), "I Don't See Me In Your Eyes Anymore" (pop No. 47), "I Love My Friend" (pop No. 24), and "She Called Me Baby" (pop No. 47). Both RCA Records and Mercury Records (Smash was a subsidiary of Mercury that was absorbed into the main company in 1970) also re-released his previously recorded material from the mid-1960s. All of this success led the CMA to name him Entertainer of the Year in 1974. In the same year he performed the Academy Award-nominated theme song "I Feel Love (Benji's Theme)" from the film Benji. Rich had three more Top 5 hits in 1975, but though he was at the peak of his popularity, he began to drink heavily, causing considerable problems off-stage.

==== CMA awards 1975 ====
Rich's problematic drinking famously showed at the CMA awards ceremony for 1975, when he presented the award for Entertainer of the Year while visibly intoxicated. After stumbling through the names of the nominees, he clumsily tore open the envelope, took out a cigarette lighter, and lit fire to the paper with the winner's name. He then announced the winner of the award as "My friend Mr. John Denver". Some considered it an act of rebellion against the Music Row-controlled Nashville Sound; others speculated that it was a protest against the award going to Denver, whose music Rich had considered too "pop" and not enough "country". Many, including industry insiders, were outraged, and Rich's popularity took a dive.

In a 2016 interview, former CMA Executive Director Jo Walker-Meador speculated that Rich's drunkenness may have been in part due to resentment over his being shut out of the nominations that year, after his success at the 1974 awards. His son Charlie, Jr., says on his website:

I'll tell you why I thought he did it. #1 He thought it would be funny. He set it up by talking about how the potential winners were probably nervous, as he had been the previous year. #2 Bad judgment. He had recently broken his foot in a freak accident at his home in Memphis. ... So...Due to the pain, he took pain medication the night of the show: Bad idea! Secondly, he and another country star got to drinking gin and tonics while waiting in the dressing room. The show was long, so by the time Dad was supposed to go on, the drinks on top of the medication got him buzzed. ... Primarily he thought it would be funny. I know the last thing my father would have wanted to do was set himself up as judge of another musician. He felt badly that people thought it was a statement against John Denver.

The slump in Rich's career was exacerbated by the fact that his records began to sound increasingly similar: pop-inflected country ballads with overdubbed strings and little jazz or blues. He did not have a Top 10 hit again until "Rollin' With the Flow" went to No. 1 on the country charts (as well as No. 32 on the easy listening charts) in 1977. Early in 1978, he signed with United Artists Records, and throughout that year, he had hits on both Epic and UA. His hits in 1978 included the Top 10 hits "Beautiful Woman", "Puttin' In Overtime At Home", and his last No. 1 with "On My Knees", a duet with Janie Fricke.

=== Decline in activity and semi-retirement ===
In 1979, Rich had moderate success with his singles, his biggest hit being a version of "Spanish Eyes" that entered the country Top 20. He appeared as himself in the 1978 Clint Eastwood movie Every Which Way but Loose, performing "I'll Wake You Up When I Get Home". This song hit No. 3 on the country charts in 1979 and was the last Top 10 country single of his career. In 1980, he switched labels again to Elektra Records and that fall released a No. 12 country single, "A Man Just Don't Know What a Woman Goes Through". One more Top 40 hit followed, the Gary Stewart song "Are We Dreamin' the Same Dream" early in 1981. Also in 1981, he had a bit part in the movie Take This Job and Shove It, which yielded his last charted single, "You Made It Beautiful". Rich decided to remove himself from the spotlight, and for over a decade he lived off his investments in semi-retirement, only playing occasional concerts.

In 1992, Rich emerged from his semi-retirement to release on Sire Records Pictures and Paintings, a jazzy album produced by journalist Peter Guralnick. It received positive critical reviews and restored Rich's reputation as a musician, but it was his last album. In 2016, a tribute album titled Feel Like Going Home: The Songs of Charlie Rich was released by Memphis International Records. Tom Waits, who was an opening act for Rich in the 1970s, mentions him in the song "Putnam County" from his album Nighthawks at the Diner with the lyric: "The radio's spitting out Charlie Rich... He sure can sing, that son of a bitch." In 2009, Charlie Rich was formally inducted into the Arkansas Walk of Fame located at 629 Central Avenue in Hot Springs National Park, Arkansas.

== Death ==
Charlie Rich and his wife were driving to Florida for a vacation after seeing their son Allan perform with Freddy Fender at Lady Luck Casino in Natchez, Mississippi, when he experienced a bout of severe coughing. After visiting a doctor in St. Francisville, Louisiana, and receiving antibiotics, he continued traveling. They stopped for the night in a motel in Hammond, Louisiana, where Rich died in his sleep on July 25, 1995, at age 62. The cause of death was a pulmonary embolism. He is buried in the Memorial Park Cemetery in Memphis, Tennessee.

Margaret Rich died in Germantown, Tennessee, on July 22, 2010, at age 76, and is buried alongside her husband.

== Awards ==
Academy of Country Music

- 1973 Album of the Year – Behind Closed Doors
- 1973 Single of the Year – "Behind Closed Doors"
- 1973 Top Male Vocalist

American Music Awards

- 1974 Favorite Country Single – "Behind Closed Doors"
- 1975 Favorite Country Male Artist
- 1975 Favorite Country Single – "The Most Beautiful Girl"

Country Music Association

- 1973 Album of the Year – Behind Closed Doors
- 1973 Single of the Year – "Behind Closed Doors"
- 1973 Male Vocalist of the Year
- 1974 Album of the Year – "A Very Special Love Song"
- 1974 Entertainer of the Year

Grammy Awards

- 1974 Best Country Vocal Performance, Male – "Behind Closed Doors"
- 1998 Grammy Hall of Fame Award – "Behind Closed Doors"

== Other sources ==
- "Charlie Rich Bio". CMT. Archived from the original on January 16, 2014.
