= You Won't See Me Cry =

1992 single by Wilson Phillips

Single by Wilson Phillips

from the album Shadows and Light
- B-side: "This Doesn't Have to Be Love"
- Released: April 28, 1992
- Genre: Pop
- Length: 4:51 (album version); 3:53 (single edit)
- Label: SBK
- Songwriters: Wilson Phillips; Glen Ballard
- Producer: Glen Ballard

Wilson Phillips singles chronology
"Daniel" (1991)	"You Won't See Me Cry" (1992)	"Give It Up" (1992)

"You Won't See Me Cry" is a song by American pop music group Wilson Phillips from their second studio album, Shadows and Light (1992). The song was released on April 28, 1992, by SBK Records. It was released as the lead single from the album, reaching No. 1 in Canada and Finland, No. 18 in the United Kingdom, and No. 20 on the US Billboard Hot 100. It was the group's last top-50 hit in most countries. The accompanying music video for the song was directed by Michael Bay.

== Critical reception ==
Greg Sandow from Entertainment Weekly called the song "tough/sweet blend of sadness and underlying strength." David Hiltbrand of People Magazine disagreed, describing it as a "wispy and anemic ballad."

== Chart performance ==
"You Won't See Me Cry" debuted and peaked at No. 18 on the UK Singles Chart. It also hit No. 20 on the Billboard Hot 100, No. 15 on the Cash Box Top 100 and No. 4 on the Billboard Adult Contemporary chart.

In Canada, "You Won't See Me Cry" reached number one on the RPM Top Singles chart for one week. The song also topped the Finnish Singles Chart the weeks of May 25 and June 1, 1992. Elsewhere, the single reached the top 50 in Australia, Germany, Ireland and Switzerland.

== Charts ==
=== Weekly charts ===
Chart (1992)	Peak position
Australia (ARIA)	31
Canada Top Singles (RPM)	1
Canada Adult Contemporary (RPM)	3
Europe (Eurochart Hot 100)	25
Finland (Suomen virallinen lista)	1
Germany (GfK)	36
Ireland (IRMA)	30
Netherlands (Dutch Top 40 Tipparade)	14
Netherlands (Single Top 100)	61
New Zealand (Recorded Music NZ)	46
Switzerland (Schweizer Hitparade)	11
UK Singles (Official Charts)	18
UK Airplay (Music Week)	12
US Billboard Hot 100	20
US Adult Contemporary (Billboard)	4
US Cash Box Top 100	15

=== Year-end charts ===
Chart (1992)	Position
Brazil (Crowley)	92
Canada Top Singles (RPM)	22
Canada Adult Contemporary (RPM)	22
US Adult Contemporary (Billboard)	30

== Release history ==
Region	Date	Format(s)	Label(s)	Ref.
United States	April 28, 1992	CD; cassette	SBK	
United Kingdom	May 11, 1992	7-inch vinyl; CD; cassette	SBK	
Japan	May 31, 1992	Mini-CD	SBK	
Australia	June 8, 1992	CD; cassette	SBK	
