= Give It Up (Wilson Phillips song) =

1992 single by Wilson Phillips

- UK and European cover

Single by Wilson Phillips

from the album Shadows and Light
- B-side: "Daniel"
- Released: July 1992
- Length: 4:51 (album version); 3:43 (single edit)
- Label: SBK
- Songwriters: Wilson Phillips; Glen Ballard
- Producer: Glen Ballard

Wilson Phillips singles chronology
"You Won't See Me Cry" (1992)	"Give It Up" (1992)	"Flesh and Blood" (1992)

"Give It Up" is a song by American vocal group Wilson Phillips, taken from their second studio album Shadows and Light (1992). The group wrote the track with songwriter Glen Ballard, who also produced the track. It was released on July 27, 1992, via SBK Records as the second single from the album. This was the second single from the group to feature Wendy Wilson on lead vocals.

The track proved to have minor success, peaking at number 30 on the US Billboard Hot 100, where it became Wilson Phillips' last charting single. Internationally, the track hit the top 40 in Canada and the United Kingdom.

== Critical reception ==
Larry Flick from Billboard magazine gave the single a positive review writing, "The trio's signature harmonies glide over a warm'n'summery shuffle beat. Bright synths and brassy horns add to the fun, making this a strong contender for top 40 and AC radio approval. A chipper jaunt well worth taking." Diane Rufer and Ron Fell of the Gavin Report responded favorably saying, "The ladies pick up the pace on this confrontational ice-breaker. This time, Wendy Wilson carries the lead and she does "give it up" her own vocal way."

== Music video ==
Directed by Michael Patterson and Candace Reckinger, the music video for "Give It Up" was mostly shot at Wendy Wilson's birthday party. It was released to video channels MTV and VH1 for the week of August 8, 1992. Dave Sholin of the Gavin Report described the video as a "high energy explosion of bright, colorful production and tight harmony."

== Track listings and formats ==
- UK 7-inch and cassette single; Japanese mini-CD single
1. "Give It Up" – 4:49
2. "Daniel" – 4:01
- European 7-inch single
1. "Give It Up" (Hit Version) – 3:40
2. "Give It Up" (AC Version) – 4:10
- Dutch CD single
1. "Give It Up" (Hit Version) – 3:43
2. "Give It Up" (Keith Cohen Extended Mix) – 5:50
3. "Give It Up" (Glen Ballard Extended Mix) – 5:52
4. "Give It Up" (AC Version) – 4:10
- UK CD single
1. "Give It Up" – 4:49
2. "Daniel" – 4:01
3. "You Won't See Me Cry"
4. "Give It Up" (Dance Mix)
- US CD single
1. "Give It Up" (Hit Version) – 3:37
2. "Give It Up" (Extended Mix) – 4:37
3. "Give It Up" (AC Version) – 4:10
4. "Give It Up" (LP Version) – 4:49
5. "Give It Up" (Keith Cohen Mix) – 3:59
- Australian and Canadian CD single
1. "Give It Up" (Hit Version) – 3:37
2. "Give It Up" (Extended Mix) – 4:37
3. "Give It Up" (AC Version) – 4:10
4. "Give It Up" (LP Version) – 4:49
5. "Give It Up" (Keith Cohen Mix) – 3:59
6. "Daniel" – 4:01
- US and Canadian cassette single
1. "Give It Up" (Hit Version) – 3:37
2. "Give It Up" (Extended Mix) – 4:37
3. "Give It Up" (Keith Cohen Extended Mix) – 5:51
4. "Daniel" – 4:01

== Charts ==
=== Weekly charts ===
Weekly chart performance for "Give It Up"
Chart (1992)	Peak position
Australia (ARIA)	206
Canada Top Singles (RPM)	16
Canada Adult Contemporary (RPM)	11
Europe (European Hit Radio)	32
Germany (GfK)	54
Germany Airplay (Music & Media)	18
UK Singles (Official Charts)	36
UK Airplay (Music Week)	36
US Billboard Hot 100	30
US Adult Contemporary (Billboard)	12
US Cash Box Top 100	25
US Adult Contemporary (Gavin Report)	5
US Top 40 (Gavin Report)	13
US Adult Contemporary (Radio & Records)	10
US Contemporary Hit Radio (Radio & Records)	17

=== Year-end charts ===
Year-end chart performance for "Give It Up"
Chart (1992)	Position
US Adult Contemporary (Gavin Report)	52
US Adult Contemporary (Radio & Records)	62

== Release history ==
Release dates and formats for "Give It Up"
Region	Date	Format(s)	Label(s)	Ref.
United States	July 1992	—N/a	SBK	
Japan	August 12, 1992	Mini-CD	SBK	
Australia	October 5, 1992	CD; cassette	SBK	
