= The Dream Is Still Alive =

Single by Wilson Phillips

from the album Wilson Phillips
- B-side: "Next To You (Someday I'll Be)"
- Released: May 20, 1991
- Recorded: 1989–1990
- Genre: Pop
- Length: 4:05
- Label: SBK
- Songwriters: Wilson Phillips; Glen Ballard
- Producer: Glen Ballard

Wilson Phillips singles chronology
"You're in Love" (1991)	"The Dream Is Still Alive" (1991)	"Daniel" (1991)

"The Dream Is Still Alive" is a song by the American vocal group Wilson Phillips, written by the trio and Glen Ballard, who provided production for the track. Released on May 20, 1991, to US contemporary hit radio via SBK Records, it was the fifth and final single taken from their eponymous debut studio album (1990) and services as the closer of the album. This was also the first single by the group to feature Carnie Wilson on lead vocals.

The least successful single from their debut record, "The Dream Is Still Alive" broke their streak of top-ten hits in both Canada and the United States, stalling at numbers 11 and 12 on the RPM Top Singles and Billboard Hot 100 charts. It did however continue their success on adult contemporary radio, peaking at number four on the US Adult Contemporary chart. The track had little success internationally, charting in the lower regions of Australia.

== Background ==
Co-writer Glen Ballard wrote the song as his daughter was dying of cancer. He said, "When somebody really says something, people pay attention. To me, you use everything in life. Everything doesn't have to be heavy. For that song "The Dream Is Still Alive," that was a heavy moment in my life, but certainly, to me, it's something beautiful."

== Critical reception ==
Diane Rufer and Ron Fell of the Gavin Report gave the single a positive review saying, "Their harmonies are so warming that there's been no overkill, just the feeling of wanting more from this fabulous trio." Dave Sholin of the same publication also offered a favorable review saying, "No matter what the human condition, clinging to the hope that things will improve makes getting through difficult times bearable. America's favorite new trio expresses that beautifully in song, both in English and in Spanish, and of course always in harmony."

== Track listings and formats ==
- UK 7-inch single
1. "The Dream Is Still Alive" (Radio Edit) – 4:11
2. "Next to You (Someday I'll Be)" – 4:34
- European 7-inch single
1. "The Dream Is Still Alive" (Album Version) – 4:11
2. "The Dream Is Still Alive" (Spanglish Version) – 4:09
- European 12-inch maxi-single
1. "The Dream Is Still Alive" (Album Version) – 4:11
2. "The Dream Is Still Alive" (Spanglish Version) – 4:09
3. "Mi Sueno Vive Aun" (Version Español) – 4:10
- UK CD single
1. "The Dream Is Still Alive" (Radio Edit) – 4:11
2. "The Dream Is Still Alive" (Spanglish Version) – 4:12
3. "Mi Sueno Vive Aun" (Version Español) – 4:11
4. "Next to You (Someday I'll Be)" – 4:32
- European CD single
1. "The Dream Is Still Alive" (LP Version) – 4:05
2. "The Dream Is Still Alive" (Spanglish Version) – 4:09
3. "Mi Sueno Vive Aun" (Version Español) – 4:10
4. "Next to You (Someday I'll Be)" – 4:57
- US maxi-CD single
1. "The Dream Is Still Alive" (Radio Edit) – 4:09
2. "The Dream Is Still Alive" (Spanglish Version) – 4:09
3. "Mi Sueno Vive Aun" (Version Español) – 4:10
4. "Next to You (Someday I'll Be)" – 3:43
5. "The Dream Is Still Alive" (Album Version) – 4:11
- US cassette single
1. "The Dream Is Still Alive" (Radio Edit) – 4:09
2. "The Dream Is Still Alive" (Spanglish Version) – 4:09
3. "Mi Sueno Vive Aun" (Version Español) – 4:10
4. "Next to You (Someday I'll Be)" – 3:43

== Charts ==
=== Weekly charts ===
Weekly chart performance for "The Dream Is Still Alive"
Chart (1991)	Peak position
Australia (ARIA)	190
Canada Top Singles (RPM)	11
Canada Adult Contemporary (RPM)	4
UK Airplay (Music Week)	27
US Billboard Hot 100	12
US Adult Contemporary (Billboard)	4
US Adult Contemporary (Gavin Report)	4
US Top 100 Pop Singles (Cashbox)	11
US Top 40 (Gavin Report)	7
US Adult Contemporary (Radio & Records)	5
US Contemporary Hit Radio (Radio & Records)	12

=== Year-end charts ===
Year-end chart performance for "The Dream Is Still Alive"
Chart (1991)	Position
Canada Top Singles (RPM)	86
US Adult Contemporary (Billboard)	39
US Adult Contemporary (Gavin Report)	34
US Top 40 (Gavin Report)	64
US Adult Contemporary (Radio & Records)	39
