= Wilson Phillips (album) =

Studio album by Wilson Phillips
- Released: March 27, 1990
- Studios: Record One, Los Angeles; Ocean Way, Hollywood; Westlake, Los Angeles; Studio Ultimo, Los Angeles; Lion Share, Los Angeles; Soundcastle, Santa Monica; Music Grinder, Hollywood
- Genres: Pop; pop rock; soft rock
- Length: 45:56
- Label: SBK
- Producer: Glen Ballard

Wilson Phillips chronology
Wilson Phillips (1990)	Shadows and Light (1992)

Singles from Wilson Phillips
- 1. "Hold On" Released: February 27, 1990; 2. "Release Me" Released: June 4, 1990; 3. "Impulsive" Released: October 1, 1990; 4. "You're in Love" Released: January 30, 1991; 5. "The Dream Is Still Alive" Released: May 20, 1991

Wilson Phillips is the debut album by American vocal group Wilson Phillips, released in 1990 by SBK Records. The album was successful in the United States, where it peaked at number two on the Billboard 200 chart for 10 weeks starting August 4, 1990. It spent 125 weeks on the charts, including one year in the top 10. The album has sold five million copies in the United States and over eight million worldwide.

Five singles were released from the album, with "Hold On", "Release Me" and "You're in Love" all reaching number one on the US Billboard Hot 100 singles chart. "Impulsive" reached number four, and the fifth single, "The Dream Is Still Alive", peaked at number 12. The album and its singles earned the group five Grammy Award nominations, including Album of the Year, Song of the Year, and Best New Artist.

== Critical reception ==
Professional ratings
Review scores
Source	Rating
AllMusic	4/5 stars
Calgary Herald	D
Robert Christgau	C
Entertainment Weekly	C−
NME	6/10
The Rolling Stone Album Guide	2.5/5 stars
Select	2/5

The Globe and Mail called the album "a pleasant but lightweight collection of ditties that owes more to Stevie Nicks and (especially) Paula Abdul than it does to the respective artists' mamas and papas." The New York Times considered it "an engaging high-gloss album of pop-rock songs that deal mostly with the complications of young love." The Calgary Herald concluded that "slick production and the fact the gals harmonize nicely can't mask a shallowness so profound, it makes Martika seem deep."

== Track listing ==
Side one
No.	Title	Writer(s)	Lead vocals	Length
1.	"Hold On"	Glen Ballard; Chynna Phillips; Carnie Wilson	Chynna Phillips	4:27
2.	"Release Me"	Phillips; C. Wilson; Wendy Wilson	Chynna Phillips	4:56
3.	"Impulsive"	Steve Kipner; Clif Magness	Wendy Wilson	4:34
4.	"Next to You (Someday I'll Be)"	David Batteau; Darrell Brown; Madeline Stone	Carnie Wilson	4:57
5.	"You're in Love"	Ballard; Phillips; C. Wilson; W. Wilson	Chynna Phillips	4:51

Side two
No.	Title	Writer(s)	Lead vocals	Length
6.	"Over and Over"	Ballard; Phillips; C. Wilson; W. Wilson	Carnie Wilson	4:40
7.	"A Reason to Believe" (Tim Hardin cover)	Tim Hardin	Chynna Phillips	4:04
8.	"Ooh You're Gold"	Ballard; Phillips; C. Wilson; W. Wilson	Wendy Wilson	4:19
9.	"Eyes Like Twins"	Rupert Hine; Jeanette Therese Obstoj	Carnie Wilson and Chynna Phillips	5:03
10.	"The Dream Is Still Alive"	Ballard; Phillips; C. Wilson; W. Wilson	Carnie Wilson and Chynna Phillips	4:05

== Personnel ==
Wilson Phillips

- Chynna Phillips – lead vocals (1, 2, 5–7, 9, 10), backing vocals
- Carnie Wilson – lead vocals (4, 6, 9, 10), backing vocals
- Wendy Wilson – lead vocals (3, 8), backing vocals

Musicians

- Glen Ballard – keyboards (1, 2, 4–10), rhythm arrangements (1, 2, 4–10)
- Randy Kerber – keyboards (1, 2, 4–10)
- Clif Magness – keyboards (3), rhythm guitar (3), arrangements (3)
- Bill Payne – organ (3, 10)
- Michael Landau – guitars (1, 2, 4–6, 8–10)
- Joe Walsh – additional rhythm guitar (1, 7), rhythm guitar (3), slide guitar solo (3)
- Steve Lukather – rhythm guitar (7), guitar solo (7, 9)
- ??? - guitar solo (5) (more information required)
- Basil Fung – rhythm guitar (10)
- Jimmy Johnson – bass (1–4, 6–9)
- Abraham Laboriel – bass (5)
- Neil Stubenhaus – bass (10)
- John Robinson – drums
- Paulinho da Costa – percussion
- Vocals arranged by Glen Ballard and Wilson Phillips

== Production ==
- Executive producer – Charles Koppelman
- Produced by Glen Ballard
- Recorded and mixed by Francis Buckley
- Additional recording – Glen Ballard, Tom Biener, Francis Buckley, Julie Last, Clif Magness, Gabriel Moffat, and Rail Jon Rogut
- Second engineers – Dan Bosworth, Rick Butz, Daryll Dobson, and Bill Malina
- Recorded at (more information required)
- Mixed at Garden Rake Studio (Sherman Oaks, California)
- Mastered by Bernie Grundman at Bernie Grundman Mastering (Hollywood)
- Design – Mark Larson
- Cover photography – Timothy White
- Inside photography – Alberto Tallot

== Charts ==
=== Weekly charts ===
Weekly chart performance for Wilson Phillips
Chart (1990–1991)	Peak position
Australian Albums (ARIA)	7
Austrian Albums (Ö3 Austria)	19
Canada Top Albums/CDs (RPM)	1
Dutch Albums (Album Top 100)	51
German Albums (Offizielle Top 100)	15
New Zealand Albums (RMNZ)	10
Norwegian Albums (VG-lista)	16
Swedish Albums (Sverigetopplistan)	27
Swiss Albums (Schweizer Hitparade)	16
UK Albums (Official Charts)	7
US Billboard 200	2

=== Year-end charts ===
1990 Year-end chart performance for Wilson Phillips
Chart (1990)	Position
Canada Top Albums/CDs (RPM)	5
German Albums (Offizielle Top 100)	48
New Zealand Albums (RMNZ)	44
Swiss Albums (Schweizer Hitparade)	22
US Billboard 200	15

1991 Year-end chart performance for Wilson Phillips
Chart (1991)	Position
Canada Top Albums/CDs (RPM)	50
US Billboard 200	5

=== Decade-end charts ===
Decade-end chart performance for Wilson Phillips
Chart (1990–1999)	Position
US Billboard 200	52

=== All-time charts ===
All-time charts for Wilson Phillips
Chart	Position
US Billboard 200 (Women)	26

== Certifications ==
Certifications for Wilson Phillips
Region	Certification	Certified units/sales
Australia (ARIA)	Gold	35,000^{^}
Canada (Music Canada)	7× Platinum	700,000^{^}
Germany (BVMI)	Gold	250,000^{^}
Japan (RIAJ)	Gold	100,000^{^}
New Zealand (RMNZ)	Gold	7,500^{^}
Spain (Promusicae)	Gold	50,000^{^}
Switzerland (IFPI Switzerland)	Gold	25,000^{^}
United Kingdom (BPI)	Platinum	300,000^{^}
United States (RIAA)	5× Platinum	5,000,000^{^}
^{^} Shipments figures based on certification alone.
