= Impulsive (song) =

1990 single by Wilson Phillips

Single by Wilson Phillips

from the album Wilson Phillips
- B-side: "Next to You (Someday I'll Be)"
- Released: October 1990
- Genre: Pop
- Length: 4:33
- Label: SBK
- Songwriters: Clif Magness; Steve Kipner
- Producer: Glen Ballard

Wilson Phillips singles chronology
"Release Me" (1990)	"Impulsive" (1990)	"You're in Love" (1991)

Audio video
- "Impulsive" on YouTube

"Impulsive" is a song by American vocal group Wilson Phillips. It was released in October 1990 via SBK Records as the third single from their eponymous debut studio album (1990). The track was written by Clif Magness and Steve Kipner, with production provided by Glen Ballard. It was the first single to feature Wendy Wilson as the lead vocalist instead of Chynna Phillips and also includes a slide guitar solo provided from Joe Walsh.

"Impulsive" peaked at number four on the US Billboard Hot 100, becoming Wilson Phillips' third consecutive top-five hit. The track also became their second number-one single on the Canadian RPM 100 Hit Tracks chart. Internationally, the track entered the top 40 in Austria, the Netherlands, New Zealand, and Switzerland. Billboard ranked the song at number 99 on their list of the "100 Greatest Girl Group Songs of All Time".

== Composition ==
"Impulsive", according to the sheet music published by Alfred Publishing Co., Inc on Musicnotes.com, is written in the key of E major. Wendy Wilson's vocals on the track range from A3–C♯. In The Oxford Handbook of Impulse Control Disorders, they described the lyrics as "the troubadour [singing] about longing to be free from thinking of consequences, not wanting to overanalyze the situation, and wanting to just be impulsive and to fall into a romantic embrace."

== Critical reception ==
Diane Rufer and Ron Fell of Gavin Report responded positively to "Impulsive", writing that the track "broadens their horizons with a fresh new edge to their sound." Their colleague Dave Sholin also gave the track a favorable review saying, "The trio tops off what will turn out to be an unforgettable year with yet another bright and totally accessible gem." Billboard also wrote favorably of "Impulsive" saying, "Third-single ballad from mega-hot debut album should keep the flame smoldering, with its brain-imbedding chorus and luscious harmonizing. Radio remix pumps up the guitar lines, providing a harder edge missing from previous efforts. Pan-European magazine Music & Media said, "A constrained, guitar-based song with a good chorus and some fine West Coast harmony vocals."

== Track listings ==
US cassette single

1. "Impulsive" (AOR mix) – 4:33
2. "Impulsive" (album version) – 4:34

UK 7-inch single

A. "Impulsive"
B. "Impulsive" (album mix)

UK CD single

1. "Impulsive"
2. "Impulsive" (album mix)
3. "Release Me"

European 12-inch single

A1. "Impulsive" (remix) – 4:38
B1. "Next to You (Someday I'll Be)" – 4:57
B2. "Hold On" – 4:23

Japanese mini-CD single

1. "Impulsive (インパルシヴ)"
2. "A Reason to Believe (ア・リーズン・トゥ・ビリーヴ)"

== Charts ==
=== Weekly charts ===
Chart (1990–1991)	Peak position
Australia (ARIA)	103
Austria (Ö3 Austria Top 40)	29
Austria Airplay (Music & Media)	6
Canada Top Singles (RPM)	1
Canada Adult Contemporary (RPM)	1
Europe (European Airplay Top 50)	44
Germany (GfK)	59
Germany Airplay (Music & Media)	19
Italy Airplay (RAI Stereo Due)	19
Netherlands (Dutch Top 40)	37
Netherlands (Single Top 100)	31
New Zealand (Recorded Music NZ)	28
Switzerland (Schweizer Hitparade)	30
UK Singles (Official Charts)	42
US Billboard Hot 100	4
US Adult Contemporary (Billboard)	2
US Top 100 Pop Singles (Cash Box)	3
US Adult Contemporary (Gavin Report)	1
US Top 40 (Gavin Report)	2
US Adult Contemporary (Radio & Records)	1
US Contemporary Hit Radio (Radio & Records)	3

=== Year-end charts ===
Chart (1990)	Position
Canada Top Singles (RPM)	32
Canada Adult Contemporary (RPM)	50
US Adult Contemporary (Gavin Report)	42
US Top 40 (Gavin Report)	93
US Adult Contemporary (Radio & Records)	50

Chart (1991)	Position
US Billboard Hot 100	48
US Adult Contemporary (Billboard)	31
US Adult Contemporary (Radio & Records)	90

== Release history ==
Region	Date	Format(s)	Label(s)	Ref.
United States	October 1990	Cassette	SBK	
United Kingdom	October 29, 1990	7-inch vinyl; 12-inch vinyl; CD; cassette	SBK	
Japan	November 28, 1990	Mini-CD	SBK	
Australia	December 3, 1990	7-inch vinyl; cassette	SBK	
