= Daniel (Elton John song) =

1973 song by Elton John

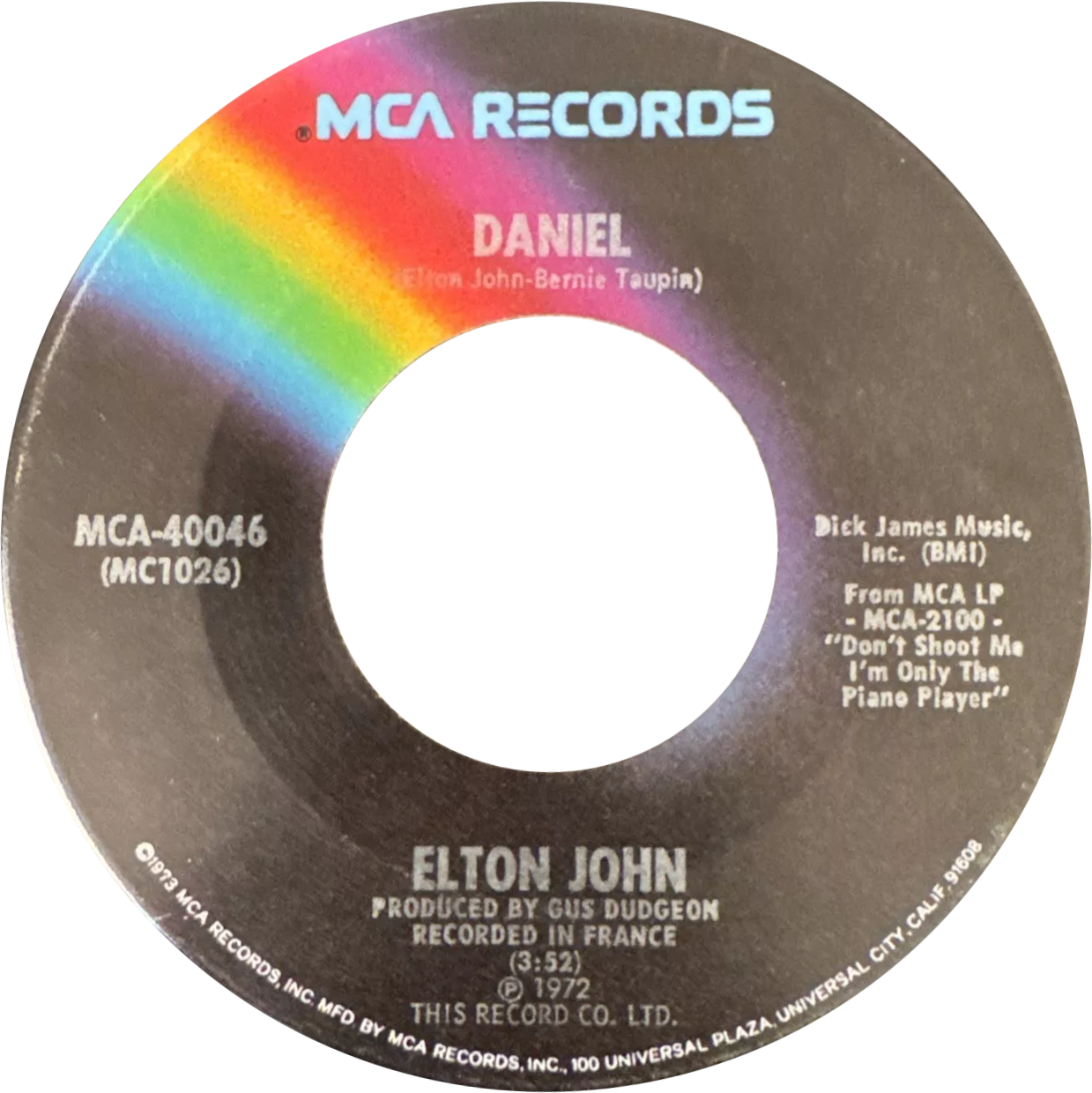
- One of side-A labels of the US single

Single by Elton John

from the album Don't Shoot Me I'm Only the Piano Player
- B-side: "Skyline Pigeon"
- Released: January 1973
- Recorded: 10 June 1972, Château d'Hérouville, France
- Genre: Soft rock
- Length: 3:54
- Label: MCA (US), DJM (UK)
- Songwriters: Elton John; Bernie Taupin
- Producer: Gus Dudgeon

Elton John singles chronology
"Crocodile Rock" (1972)	"Daniel" (1973)	"Saturday Night's Alright for Fighting" (1973)

"Daniel" is a song written by the British musician Elton John and lyricist Bernie Taupin, and performed by John. It was first released on John's 1973 album Don't Shoot Me I'm Only the Piano Player as its opening track. The original single release was also notable for a re-recorded version of "Skyline Pigeon" (from John's 1969 debut album Empty Sky) on its B-side, which went on to be a popular track in its own right.

In the United Kingdom, the song reached No. 4 in the official chart. In the United States, the song reached No. 2 on the pop charts (only held from number one by "My Love" by Paul McCartney and Wings) and No. 1 on the adult contemporary charts for two weeks in the spring of 1973.

In the US, it was certified gold in September 1995 and platinum in May 2018 by the RIAA. In Canada, it became his second No. 1 single, following "Crocodile Rock" earlier in the year, holding the position for two weeks in the RPM 100 national singles chart. John and Taupin received the 1973 Ivor Novello award for Best Song Musically and Lyrically. The song appeared on the soundtrack of the 1974 film Alice Doesn't Live Here Anymore.

== Composition ==
Bernie Taupin wrote the lyrics after reading an article in either Time or Newsweek about a Vietnam War veteran who had been wounded, and wanted to get away from the attention he was receiving when he came back home. The last verse in the original draft was cut from the final version, which has led to some speculation on the contents.

== Reception ==
Cash Box said that the "fascinating lyrics by Bernie Taupin will make you want to listen over and over again." Record World called it "a natural smash, and one of [John's and Taupin's] best pennings in a while."

== Personnel ==
- Elton John – vocals, backing vocals, Fender Rhodes electric piano, Mellotron (flute parts)
- Davey Johnstone – acoustic guitar, banjo
- Dee Murray – bass
- Nigel Olsson – drums, maracas
- Ken Scott – ARP synthesizer

== Charts ==
=== Weekly charts ===
Chart (1973)	Peak position
Canada Top Singles (RPM)	1
Canada Adult Contemporary (RPM)	2
Ireland (Irish Singles Chart)	4
Italy	4
Netherlands (Dutch Top 40)	14
Netherlands (Dutch Single Top 100)	15
New Zealand (Official New Zealand Music Chart)	2
Norway (VG-lista)	8
South Africa (Springbok Radio)	7
Switzerland (Schweizer Hitparade)	5
UK Singles (OCC)	4
US Billboard Hot 100	2
US Easy Listening (Billboard)	1
US Cash Box Top 100	2
West Germany (GfK Entertainment Charts)	27
Zimbabwe (ZIMA)	2

=== Year-end charts ===
Chart (1973)	Rank
Australia (ARIA)	55
Brazil (Crowley)	22
Canada Top Singles (RPM)	19
US Billboard Hot 100	48
US Cash Box Top 100	44

== Certifications ==
Region	Certification	Certified units/sales
New Zealand (RMNZ)	Platinum	30,000^{‡}
United Kingdom (BPI)	Silver	200,000^{‡}
United States (RIAA)	Platinum	1,000,000^{‡}
^{‡} Sales+streaming figures based on certification alone.

== Accolades ==
Grammy Awards

Year	Nominee / work	Award	Result
1974	"Daniel"	Best Pop Vocal Performance – Male	Nominated

== Notable covers ==
=== Wilson Phillips version ===
"Daniel"

Song by Wilson Phillips

from the album Two Rooms: Celebrating the Songs of Elton John & Bernie Taupin
- A-side: "Give It Up"
- Recorded: 1991
- Studio: Westlake Studios; Capitol Studios (Los Angeles, CA)
- Length: 4:03
- Label: Polydor
- Songwriters: Elton John; Bernie Taupin
- Producer: Glen Ballard

Wilson Phillips singles chronology
"The Dream Is Still Alive" (1991)	"Daniel" (1991)	"You Won't See Me Cry" (1992)

"Daniel" was covered on the 1991 tribute album Two Rooms: Celebrating the Songs of Elton John & Bernie Taupin by American female vocal group Wilson Phillips. Although never released as an official single, the track garnered strong airplay on adult contemporary radio stations, and as a result peaked at number seven on both the US Adult Contemporary and Canadian RPM Adult Contemporary charts. The track also peaked within the top forty of the Canada RPM Top Singles chart. The song is also the B-Side for "Give It Up".

==== Critical reception ====
Their cover of "Daniel" received a negative review by Evan Cater of AllMusic, saying that the group "makes a chipper dentist's office ballad" out of the cover.

==== Personnel ====
Taken from the album booklet.

- Glen Ballard – producer, vocal arrangement, rhythm arrangement, electric piano, and synthesizer
- Wilson Phillips – vocal arrangement
- Jerry Hey – string arrangement
- Randy Kerber – acoustic piano
- Michael Landau – guitar
- Neil Stubenhaus – bass
- John Robinson – cymbals
- Michael Boddicker – synthesizer programming
- Daniel Higgins – sax

==== Charts ====
Chart (1991–1992)	Peak position
Canada Top Singles (RPM)	26
Canada Adult Contemporary (RPM)	7
US Adult Contemporary (Billboard)	7

Year-end chart performance for "Daniel"
Chart (1992)	Position
Brazil (Crowley)	33
Canada Adult Contemporary (RPM)	68

=== Other versions ===
Marie Laforêt adapted and covered the song in French in 1974. It was released as the B-side of the "Cadeau" EP. 125,000 copies were sold in France.

American rock band Fuel covered the song in 2000, as a part of their album “Something Like Human”.

Singer-songwriter Will Oldham sang the track as Bonnie "Prince" Billy with heavily distorted voice, accompanied by the post-rock band Tortoise on their collaborative 2006 album Brave and the Bold.

Sam Smith covered the song for the 2018 tribute album Revamp: Reimagining the Songs of Elton John & Bernie Taupin.

The On Cinema character Wendy Kerby (portrayed by Jessica Ruth Bell) covered the song for the Wendy Kerby Valentine's Day Special on the HEI Network in 2022.

== See also ==
- List of RPM number-one singles of 1973 (Canada)
- List of number-one adult contemporary singles of 1973 (U.S.)
