= Hold On (Wilson Phillips song) =

1990 single by Wilson Phillips

Single by Wilson Phillips

from the album Wilson Phillips
- B-side: "Over and Over"
- Released: February 27, 1990
- Recorded: 1989
- Genre: Pop
- Length: 4:27 (album version); 3:42 (single/video version)
- Label: SBK
- Songwriters: Carnie Wilson; Chynna Phillips; Glen Ballard
- Producer: Glen Ballard

Wilson Phillips singles chronology
"Hold On" (1990)	"Release Me" (1990)

Audio sample
- "Hold On": file; help

Music video
- "Hold On" on YouTube

"Hold On" is a song by American vocal group Wilson Phillips, released on February 27, 1990, by SBK Records as the lead single from their debut studio album, Wilson Phillips (1990). The song was written by Carnie Wilson, Chynna Phillips, and Glen Ballard and produced by Ballard. It topped the US Billboard Hot 100 for a week in June 1990 and was the most successful single of that year in the US. It also became a worldwide hit, peaking within the top three in Australia and Canada and the top 10 in Belgium, Ireland, New Zealand, Sweden, and the United Kingdom. The song received platinum sales certifications in Australia and the UK and a gold certification in the US. Julien Temple directed its accompanying music video, which was filmed on locations in California.

"Hold On" won the Billboard Music Award for Hot 100 Single of the Year for 1990. At the 33rd Annual Grammy Awards, "Hold On" was nominated for Song of the Year and Best Pop Vocal Performance by a Duo or Group, losing in both categories. In 2017, Billboard ranked the song number 15 in their list of "100 Greatest Girl Group Songs of All Time". In 2020, Cleveland.com ranked it at number 37 in their list of the best Billboard Hot 100 No. 1 song of the 1990s. In 2022, Pitchfork ranked number 246 in their list of "The 250 Best Songs of the 1990s".

== Background ==
Chynna Phillips wrote the song's lyrics while battling substance abuse, as well as being in a "really bad" relationship. She explained to Kelly Clarkson in 2020, "I just said if I don't change my course, I'm going to be in a lot of trouble." Producer Glen Ballard presented the track to the group, noting it needed lyrics. Phillips based the lyrics on the principles taught in Alcoholics Anonymous, specifically the idea that things had to be taken "one day at a time." The next day, Phillips returned with "Hold On" and sang it for the Wilsons and Ballard, who immediately loved it. "I remember one guy I played it for said, 'That's not going to go anywhere. That's not a very good song. It's really corny,'" Phillips recalls. "I just remember thinking to myself, 'God, I hope he's wrong.'"

== Commercial performance ==
"Hold On" became Wilson Phillips' first number-one single, reaching the top spot of the US Billboard Hot 100 on June 9, 1990, and, despite spending just a single week at number one, was ranked the top song of the year by Billboard. (This was the second and most recent concurrence of this to date, the first of which was "Stranger on the Shore" by "Mr." Acker Bilk in 1962.) The song also spent a week atop the adult contemporary chart that same year. In Europe, "Hold On" peaked at number six on the UK Singles Chart; this was in large part due to a performance by the group on the legendary British music series Top of the Pops a week prior to the song's peak position. Additionally, it was a top 10-hit also in Belgium, Ireland, and Sweden, while peaking within the top 20 in the Netherlands, Switzerland, and West Germany.

Despite being number one on the US year-end for 1990, the song did not appear on the 1990s decade-end chart. It does, however, appear on Billboard's 60th anniversary "All-time chart" at number 228, ahead of many songs that do appear on the decade-end chart.

== Critical reception ==
Alex Henderson from AllMusic felt the song is not "remotely convincing." J.D. Considine from The Baltimore Sun complimented it as "a tough-but-tuneful paean to self-reliance" and "irresistibly catchy". Bill Coleman from Billboard magazine described it as an "engaging and melodic pop confection". In 2020, Tony L. Smith from Cleveland.com wrote, "A decade or two ago, Wilson Phillips' inspirational anthem 'Hold On' wasn't regarded as anything more than a cheesy (maybe the cheesiest) pop song from the Nineties. But opinions change. For a generation big on nostalgia, it gets no bigger than 'Hold On', a song that has good times written all over it." The Daily Vault's Christopher Thelen stated in his review of Wilson Phillips, that it's the "defining moment" for the album, "setting the tone for what was to come as well as letting the listener know that all they have to do is sit back and enjoy the ride." A reviewer from Music & Media named it "melodic, well crafted and extremely catchy", and "everything you would expect from a band made up of daughters of rock stars." David Quantick from NME found that the single "is fine and rather thrashes everything else here [on the album]. However, since it was one of the songs here written by the cowboy-booted threesome, it bodes well for the future."

== Music video ==
A music video was produced to promote the single, directed by English film, documentary, and music-video director Julien Temple. It begins with aerial shots of a mountainside in California's San Gabriel Mountains. Wilson Phillips sing as they sit on the side of the mountain. Later, they sing as they sit together on the beach by the ocean.

Regarding the video, Wendy Wilson stated:

For that video, we spent the whole day in the mountains. We were up so high where you could only get there by helicopter. It was just breathtaking. I actually got a little hypothermia and they had to take me down from the mountain at one point. The director, Julien Temple, is this supercreative British guy and it was all his concept. He saw us as these California girls who represented the "girls next door" idea. He wanted to put us out in nature as an embodiment of that. It feels very "California" but I guess that's just who we are. I think that's what helped to make it work.

== Impact and legacy ==
In 2017, Billboard ranked "Hold On" number 15 on its "100 Greatest Girl Group Songs of All Time" list. In 2020, Cleveland.com ranked it number 37 on their list of the best Billboard Hot 100 number-one song of the 1990s. In 2022, Pitchfork ranked it number 246 on their list of "The 250 Best Songs of the 1990s". In October 2023, Billboard ranked "Hold On" number 312 on their "500 Best Pop Songs of All Time" ranking.

== Track listings ==
- US CD single
1. "Hold On" (single fade) 3:40
2. "Hold On" 4:35
- US and Canadian 7-inch vinyl and cassette single
1. "Hold On" – 3:30
2. "Over And Over" – 4:40
- UK CD
1. "Hold On" (single version) 3:42
2. "Hold On" (album version) 4:25
3. "Over and Over" 4:27
- West German maxi-CD
1. "Hold On"
2. "Over and Over"
3. "A Reason to Believe"

== Charts ==
=== Weekly charts ===
Chart (1990)	Peak position
Australia (ARIA)	2
Belgium (Ultratop 50 Flanders)	9
Canada Top Singles (RPM)	3
Canada Adult Contemporary (RPM)	1
Denmark (Hitlisten)	3
Europe (Eurochart Hot 100)	10
Finland (Suomen virallinen lista)	9
Ireland (IRMA)	7
Italy (Musica e dischi)	25
Luxembourg (Radio Luxembourg)	6
Netherlands (Dutch Top 40)	15
Netherlands (Single Top 100)	16
New Zealand (Recorded Music NZ)	6
Sweden (Sverigetopplistan)	10
Switzerland (Schweizer Hitparade)	15
UK Singles (Official Charts)	6
US Billboard Hot 100	1
US Adult Contemporary (Billboard)	1
US Cash Box Top 100	1
West Germany (GfK)	15

=== Year-end charts ===
Chart (1990)	Position
Australia (ARIA)	11
Belgium (Ultratop)	73
Canada Top Singles (RPM)	20
Canada Adult Contemporary (RPM)	20
Europe (Eurochart Hot 100)	82
Germany (Media Control)	54
New Zealand (RIANZ)	33
Sweden (Topplistan)	50
US Billboard Hot 100	1
US Adult Contemporary (Billboard)	12
US Cash Box Top 100	3

== Certifications ==
Region	Certification	Certified units/sales
Australia (ARIA)	Platinum	70,000^{^}
New Zealand (RMNZ)	2× Platinum	60,000^{‡}
United Kingdom (BPI)	Platinum	600,000^{‡}
United States (RIAA)	Gold	500,000^{^}
^{^} Shipments figures based on certification alone.^{‡} Sales+streaming figures based on certification alone.

== Release history ==
Region	Date	Format(s)	Label(s)	Ref.
United States	February 27, 1990	7-inch vinyl; cassette	SBK	
United Kingdom	May 7, 1990	7-inch vinyl; 12-inch vinyl; CD; cassette	SBK	
Australia	May 21, 1990	7-inch vinyl; 12-inch vinyl; cassette	SBK; EMI	
Japan	May 30, 1990	Mini-CD	SBK	

== In popular culture ==
Harold & Kumar sing the song as a duet while they are driving in the film Harold & Kumar Go to White Castle. The song was featured in the finale of the 2011 film Bridesmaids, performed by the band members as themselves, bringing renewed recognition to Wilson Phillips. In March 2012, Willam Belli, the former contestant of RuPaul's Drag Race, and his two fellow drag queens, Detox and Vicky Voxx, used a parody of the song (called "Chow Down (At Chick-fil-A)") to address the issues that arose between Chick-fil-A and the LGBTQ community.

== See also ==
- List of European number-one airplay songs of the 1990s
