= Wilson Phillips =

American pop vocal group

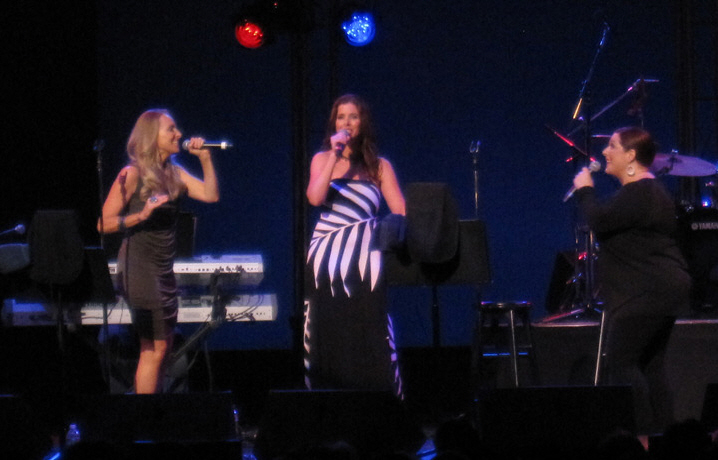
- Wilson Phillips at Cerritos Performing Arts Center, Cerritos, California, August 2011

Background information
- Origin: Los Angeles, California, U.S.
- Genres: Pop, pop rock, soft rock
- Years active: 1989–1993; 2001; 2004–2006; 2010–present
- Labels: SBK, Columbia, Sony Masterworks
- Members: Chynna Phillips; Wendy Wilson; Carnie Wilson

Wilson Phillips is an American pop vocal group formed in Los Angeles in 1989. The group consists of sisters Carnie and Wendy Wilson, the daughters of Brian Wilson of the Beach Boys, and Chynna Phillips, the daughter of John and Michelle Phillips of the Mamas and the Papas.

Their 1990 eponymous debut album sold over 10 million copies worldwide and included five major US hit singles, four of which cracked the top 10, with three peaking at number one on the Billboard Hot 100.

The group has been nominated for five Grammy Awards including Best New Artist, Album of the Year for Wilson Phillips, and Song of the Year and Best Pop Vocal Performance by a Duo or Group for "Hold On" at the 33rd Annual Grammy Awards, as well as Best Pop Vocal Performance by a Duo or Group for "You're in Love" at the 34th Annual Grammy Awards. The group has also been nominated for two American Music Awards, and in 1990, won the Billboard Music Award for Hot 100 Single of the Year for "Hold On".

== History ==
=== 1989–1991: Formation and Wilson Phillips ===
The Wilson sisters and Phillips grew up together in the Los Angeles area in the 1970s and 1980s. The three shared a love of music, and developed their singing and vocal harmonies. In 1989, the trio landed a deal with SBK Records. All three are the children of prominent musicians; Chynna is the daughter of John and Michelle Phillips of the Mamas & the Papas, and Carnie and Wendy are the daughters of Brian Wilson of the Beach Boys and Marilyn Rovell of the Honeys. Wilson Phillips released their debut album, Wilson Phillips, in 1990. Their debut single, "Hold On," hit number one on the U.S. Billboard Hot 100 chart on June 9, 1990. The single was also number one on the US Billboard Adult Contemporary and became a hit in several other countries; peaking at number two in Australia, number six in the UK, number seven in Ireland, number 10 in Sweden, and number 15 in the Netherlands, Germany, and Switzerland. The single also won Wilson Phillips the Billboard Music Award for Hot 100 Single of the Year for 1990. In addition, "Hold On" won the trio the Grand Prix at the Tokyo Music Festival. The second single, "Release Me," spent two weeks at number one. Their third single, "Impulsive," became another top ten hit, peaking at number four on the Hot 100, while fourth single "You're in Love" hit number one in the US for one week. The fifth single, "The Dream Is Still Alive", peaked at number twelve on the Hot 100.

In 1991, the group recorded their version of the song "Daniel" for the tribute album Two Rooms: Celebrating the Songs of Elton John & Bernie Taupin. While not released as a single, it peaked at number seven on the US Adult Contemporary chart due to strong airplay. Their single "You're in Love" was released that same year, which scored the group their third number one (and to date, their last top ten) pop single. In 1992, Wilson Phillips also made history as Billboard declared their debut album, at that time, the best-selling album of all time by an all female act. The album peaked at number two on the Billboard 200 album chart, with sales of 5 million copies in the US, and a total of 8 million copies sold worldwide.

=== 1992–1993: Shadows and Light and breakup ===
In June 1992, Wilson Phillips released their second album, Shadows and Light. The album was deeply personal and adopted a more serious tone, with tracks exploring issues such as child abuse ("Where Are You") and their estrangement from their fathers ("Flesh and Blood", "All the Way From New York"). The first single, "You Won't See Me Cry," peaked at number 20 in the US and number 18 in the UK, which marked the first time that they had a higher-ranking single in the UK compared to the US. The album peaked at number four on the US Billboard 200, and was eventually certified platinum in the US. However, the second single "Give It Up" became a moderate hit, peaking at number thirty, and the third single "Flesh and Blood" failed to crack the Hot 100. Shortly after, the group decided to break up, parting just after their second album. Chynna Phillips announced plans for a solo career, with their final performance as a group was singing the Star-Spangled Banner at the 1992 Major League Baseball All-Star Game in San Diego.

In 1993, Wendy and Carnie Wilson released the Christmas album Hey Santa!, a collection of classic Christmas songs which included an original song, "Hey Santa". In 1995, Chynna Phillips released a solo album, Naked and Sacred. Also in 1995, Carnie went on to host her own short-lived syndicated television talk show titled Carnie! In 1997, Carnie and Wendy, along with their father Brian Wilson, released the album The Wilsons and the single "Monday Without You." Capitol Records released a Wilson Phillips Greatest Hits album in 2000.

On March 29, 2001, the group reunited to perform The Beach Boys' song "You're So Good to Me" at a tribute show to Brian Wilson held at New York's Radio City Music Hall. Chynna Phillips also dedicated the performance to her father John Phillips, who had died a few days earlier.

=== 2004: First reunion ===
Wilson Phillips reunited in 2004 to release a new album, California—a collection of cover songs. The single, "Go Your Own Way", a song originally recorded by Fleetwood Mac, peaked at number 13 on the US Billboard Adult Contemporary chart. The album fared moderately well on the charts, debuting and peaking at number 35 on the US Billboard 200 with 31,000 copies sold in its first week of release. In New Zealand, the album reached the top 10 and amassed gold status after "Go Your Own Way" topped the country's adult contemporary radio chart. After their brief stint, the group parted ways once again.

=== 2010–present: Second reunion and Bridesmaids ===
On October 12, 2010, Wilson Phillips released a Christmas album, Christmas in Harmony. The album yielded a single, "I Wish It Could Be Christmas Everyday," a cover of the popular seasonal tune that first was a hit in 1973 for English glam-rock band Wizzard.

In 2011, the group had a resurgence in popularity with a cameo appearance in the film Bridesmaids, in which they performed "Hold On" in the finale, and helped increase sales from 1,000 to 6,000 digital downloads with the film's release. In September that same year, Chynna was a contestant on season 13 of ABC's Dancing With the Stars and explained that "Hold On" was written by herself, Carnie and Wendy about Chynna's recovery from drug and alcohol addiction. She made it to week four of the competition.

On March 20, 2012, the group appeared on QVC to promote the release of Dedicated, a studio album composed of covers of songs by both The Beach Boys and The Mamas and the Papas. The album was released on April 3, 2012, which peaked at number 29 on the US Billboard 200 chart. That same month, the trio appeared in their own reality show, Wilson Phillips: Still Holding On, which debuted on TV Guide Network.

In 2015, Wilson Phillips contributed backup vocals to the song "FourFiveSeconds" by Rihanna, Paul McCartney, and Kanye West for Rihanna's eighth studio album.

In July 2016, Wilson Phillips reunited and performed on ABC's Greatest Hits.

In 2017, the group performed on the season finale of NBC's The New Celebrity Apprentice.

In 2022, Wilson Phillips competed in season eight of The Masked Singer as the "Lambs". Chynna portrayed the Lamb by the name of "Blueberry", Carnie portrayed the Lamb by the name of "Rose", and Wendy portrayed the Lamb by the name of "Lilac". They became the first group act to advance to the finale and finished as the runners-up to Amber Riley as "Harp". As an encore, they performed "Hold On". For the Seasonal Sing-A-Long Spectacular!, they performed the Christmas classic "Sleigh Ride".

In November 2022, the group released a cover version of Harry Styles’s song "Boyfriends".

== Discography ==
=== Studio albums ===
Title	Details	Peak chart positions										Certifications (sales thresholds)
Title	Details	US	AUS	AUT	CAN	GER	NL	NZ	SWE	SWI	UK	Certifications (sales thresholds)
Wilson Phillips	Released: May 8, 1990; Label: SBK	2	7	19	1	15	51	10	27	16	7	RIAA: 5× Platinum; ARIA: Gold; BPI: Platinum; BVMI: Gold; IFPI SWI: Gold; MC: 7× Platinum; RMNZ: Gold
Shadows and Light	Released: June 2, 1992; Label: SBK	4	30	34	8	13	59	19	20	3	6	RIAA: Platinum; BPI: Silver; IFPI SWI: Gold; MC: 2× Platinum
California	Released: May 25, 2004; Label: Columbia	35	—	—	—	—	—	9	—	—	197	RMNZ: Gold
Christmas in Harmony	Released: October 12, 2010; Label: Sony Masterworks	135	—	—	—	—	—	—	—	—	—	
Dedicated	Release: April 3, 2012; Label: Sony Masterworks	29	—	—	—	—	—	—	—	—	—	
"—" denotes a recording that did not chart or was not released in that territory.

=== Compilation albums ===
Title	Details
The Best of Wilson Phillips	Released: May 26, 1998; Label: EMI Special Products
Greatest Hits	Released: May 23, 2000; Label: Capitol Records

=== Singles ===
Year	Single	Peak chart positions										Certifications (sales threshold)	Album
Year	Single	US	US AC	AUS	CAN	CAN AC	GER	NL	NZ	SWI	UK	Certifications (sales threshold)	Album
1990	"Hold On"	1	1	2	3	1	15	16	6	15	6	RIAA: Gold; ARIA: Platinum; BPI: Platinum	Wilson Phillips
1990	"Release Me"	1	1	57	1	1	37	14	18	—	36	RIAA: Gold	Wilson Phillips
1990	"Impulsive"	4	2	103	1	1	59	31	28	30	42		Wilson Phillips
1991	"You're in Love"	1	1	108	3	1	54	32	—	—	29		Wilson Phillips
1991	"The Dream Is Still Alive"	12	4	190	11	4	—	—	—	—	79		Wilson Phillips
1991	"Daniel"	—	7	—	26	7	—	—	—	—	—		Two Rooms
1992	"You Won't See Me Cry"	20	4	31	1	3	36	61	46	11	18		Shadows and Light
1992	"Give It Up"	30	12	206	16	11	54	—	—	—	36		Shadows and Light
1992	"Flesh and Blood"	—	17	—	33	12	—	51	—	—	—		Shadows and Light
2004	"Go Your Own Way"	—	13	—	—	—	—	—	—	—	—		California
2004	"Already Gone"	—	—	—	—	—	—	—	—	—	—		California
2004	"Get Together"	—	—	—	—	—	—	—	—	—	—		California
2012	"Good Vibrations"	—	25	—	—	—	—	—	—	—	—		Dedicated
2022	"Boyfriends"	—	—	—	—	—	—	—	—	—	—		Boyfriends
"—" denotes a recording that did not chart or was not released in that territory.

=== Other charted songs ===
Year	Single	Peak positions	Album
Year	Single	US AC	Album
2010	"Santa Claus Is Comin' to Town"	22	Christmas in Harmony
2010	"Little Drummer Boy"	13	Christmas in Harmony
2010	"I Wish It Could Be Christmas Every Day"	14	Christmas in Harmony

== Awards and nominations ==
=== Grammy Awards ===
Year	Nominee / work	Award	Result
1990	Wilson Phillips	Best New Artist	Nominated
1990	Wilson Phillips	Album of the Year	Nominated
1990	"Hold On"	Song of the Year	Nominated
1990	"Hold On"	Best Pop Performance by a Duo or Group with Vocals	Nominated
1991	"You're in Love"	Best Pop Performance by a Duo or Group with Vocals	Nominated

=== American Music Awards ===
Year	Nominee / work	Award	Result
1990	Wilson Phillips	Favorite New Artist – Pop/Rock	Nominated
1990	"Hold On"	Favorite Single – Pop/Rock	Nominated

=== Billboard Music Awards ===
Year	Nominee / work	Award	Result
1990	"Hold On"	Hot 100 Single of the Year	Won
