= Release Me (Wilson Phillips song) =

1990 single by Wilson Phillips

Single by Wilson Phillips

from the album Wilson Phillips
- B-side: "Eyes Like Twins"
- Released: June 1990
- Genre: Pop; easy listening
- Length: 4:56 (album version); 3:50 (single edit)
- Label: SBK
- Songwriter: Wilson Phillips
- Producer: Glen Ballard

Wilson Phillips singles chronology
"Hold On" (1990)	"Release Me" (1990)	"Impulsive" (1990)

"Release Me" is a song written and performed by American pop group Wilson Phillips, released as the second single from their debut album, Wilson Phillips (1990). The song reached number one on the US Billboard Hot 100 in September 1990 and spent two weeks at number one. It also topped the Billboard Adult Contemporary chart for a week and reached number one in Canada the same month.

== Track listings ==
US cassette single and UK 7-inch single

No.	Title	Writer(s)	Length
1.	"Release Me"	Wilson Phillips	3:48
2.	"Eyes Like Twins"	Jeannette-Thérèse Obstoj, Rupert Hine	5:00

UK 12-inch single

Side one
No.	Title	Writer(s)	Length
1.	"Release Me"	Wilson Phillips	4:56

Side two
No.	Title	Writer(s)	Length
1.	"Release Me" (single edit)	Wilson Phillips	3:48
2.	"Eyes Like Twins"	Obstoj, Hine	5:00

UK CD single

No.	Title	Writer(s)	Length
1.	"Release Me" (single edit)	Wilson Phillips
2.	"Release Me" (album version)	Wilson Phillips
3.	"Eyes Like Twins"	Obstoj, Hine
4.	"Hold On"	Chynna Phillips, Glen Ballard

European maxi-CD single

No.	Title	Writer(s)	Length
1.	"Release Me"	Wilson Phillips	4:53
2.	"Release Me" (single edit)	Wilson Phillips	3:47
3.	"Eyes Like Twins"	Obstoj, Hine	5:00
4.	"The Dream Is Still Alive"	Ballard, Wilson Phillips	4:07

== Charts ==
=== Weekly charts ===
Chart (1990)	Peak position
Australia (ARIA)	57
Austria (Ö3 Austria Top 40)	15
Belgium (Ultratop 50 Flanders)	34
Canada Retail Singles (The Record)	1
Canada Top Singles (RPM)	1
Canada Adult Contemporary (RPM)	1
Colombia (Kelme)	1
Europe (Eurochart Hot 100)	84
Germany (GfK)	37
Ireland (IRMA)	15
Italy (Musica e dischi)	25
Netherlands (Dutch Top 40)	15
Netherlands (Single Top 100)	14
New Zealand (Recorded Music NZ)	18
UK Singles (Official Charts)	36
US Billboard Hot 100	1
US Adult Contemporary (Billboard)	1
US Cash Box Top 100	2

=== Year-end charts ===
Chart (1990)	Position
Canada Top Singles (RPM)	6
Canada Adult Contemporary (RPM)	24
Netherlands (Single Top 100)	96
US Billboard Hot 100	19
US Adult Contemporary (Billboard)	13
US Cash Box Top 100	15

=== Decade-end charts ===
Chart (1990–1999)	Position
Canada (Nielsen SoundScan)	40

== Certifications ==
Region	Certification	Certified units/sales
United States (RIAA)	Gold	500,000^{^}
^{^} Shipments figures based on certification alone.

== Release history ==
Region	Date	Format(s)	Label(s)	Ref.
United States	June 1990	Cassette	SBK	
Australia	July 30, 1990	7-inch vinyl; cassette	SBK	
United Kingdom	August 6, 1990	7-inch vinyl; 12-inch vinyl; CD; cassette	SBK	
Japan	September 12, 1990	Mini-CD single	SBK	
