= SBK Records =

American record label

- Parent company: Universal Music Group (recorded music catalogue); Sony Music Publishing (publishing catalog)
- Founded: 1986; 40 years ago (music publishing division); 1989; 37 years ago (recorded music division)
- Founder: Stephen Swid; Martin Bandier; Charles Koppelman
- Defunct: July 1997; 29 years ago (music publishing and recorded music divisions)
- Status: Dormant/defunct and folded into Capitol Records for recorded music catalogue and EMI Music Publishing for music publishing catalogue
- Distributor: Capitol Music Group
- Genre: Various
- Country of origin: United States

SBK Records was a record label, owned by Universal Music Group, that is currently part of the Capitol Music Group, where it is in hibernation. The label was founded in 1988 and during its time in activity existed as part of the EMI Group.

== History ==
Stephen Swid, Martin Bandier and Charles Koppelman formed SBK Entertainment in 1989 after they purchased the music publishing division of CBS Records, CBS Songs (including April Music and Blackwood Music), in 1986 for $125 million. CBS Songs was subsequently renamed to SBK Songs. The name is an acronym incorporating the first letter of the founders' surnames.

The partners sold the company to EMI Music Publishing (for a reported US$295 million), afterward SBK Songs was renamed EMI Songs and with support of Capitol Records launched SBK Records. It was distributed through the short-lived EMI Records Group North America, or ERG. In 1989, Daniel Glass joined SBK as Senior Vice President of Promotion. In 1990, Glass was promoted to Executive Vice President/General Manager. With the consolidation of SBK, Chrysalis USA, Wild Pitch and EMI Records USA several years later into EMI Records Group North America, he rose to President-CEO.

The label had several hits with Vanilla Ice, Waterfront, Jesus Jones, Boy George, Wilson Phillips, Grayson Hugh, Jon Secada, Ya Kid K, McQueen Street, Technotronic, Blur, Billy Dean and Everyday People.

SBK Records was part of the EMI Group, but became dormant as of 2007, when Martin Bandier left EMI Music Publishing for Sony Corp.'s Sony Music Publishing. EMI (and SBK Entertainment World assets) was sold in 2012 to two different entities and split up with most of the recorded music division to Universal and music publishing division to Sony-led consortium.

SBK also signed the first Latino MC to a major label, Ray Roll, from the famed Rock Steady Crew. In November 1993, Selena was signed to the label to record her first English language pop album.

The 1994 album The Divine Comedy by Milla Jovovich was released through SBK. The album was critically acclaimed and has been in print since its release.

It also published the first ever Barney & Friends album, entitled Barney's Favorites, Volume 1.

SBK music publishing catalog (SBK/EMI Songs and April Music) is now controlled by Sony Music Publishing, and the recorded music catalog is now controlled by Universal Music Group.

SBK Records was shut down in July 1997, with all of its employees being let go.

== See also ==
- List of record labels
