= List of awards and nominations received by William H. Macy =

William H. Macy awards and nominations
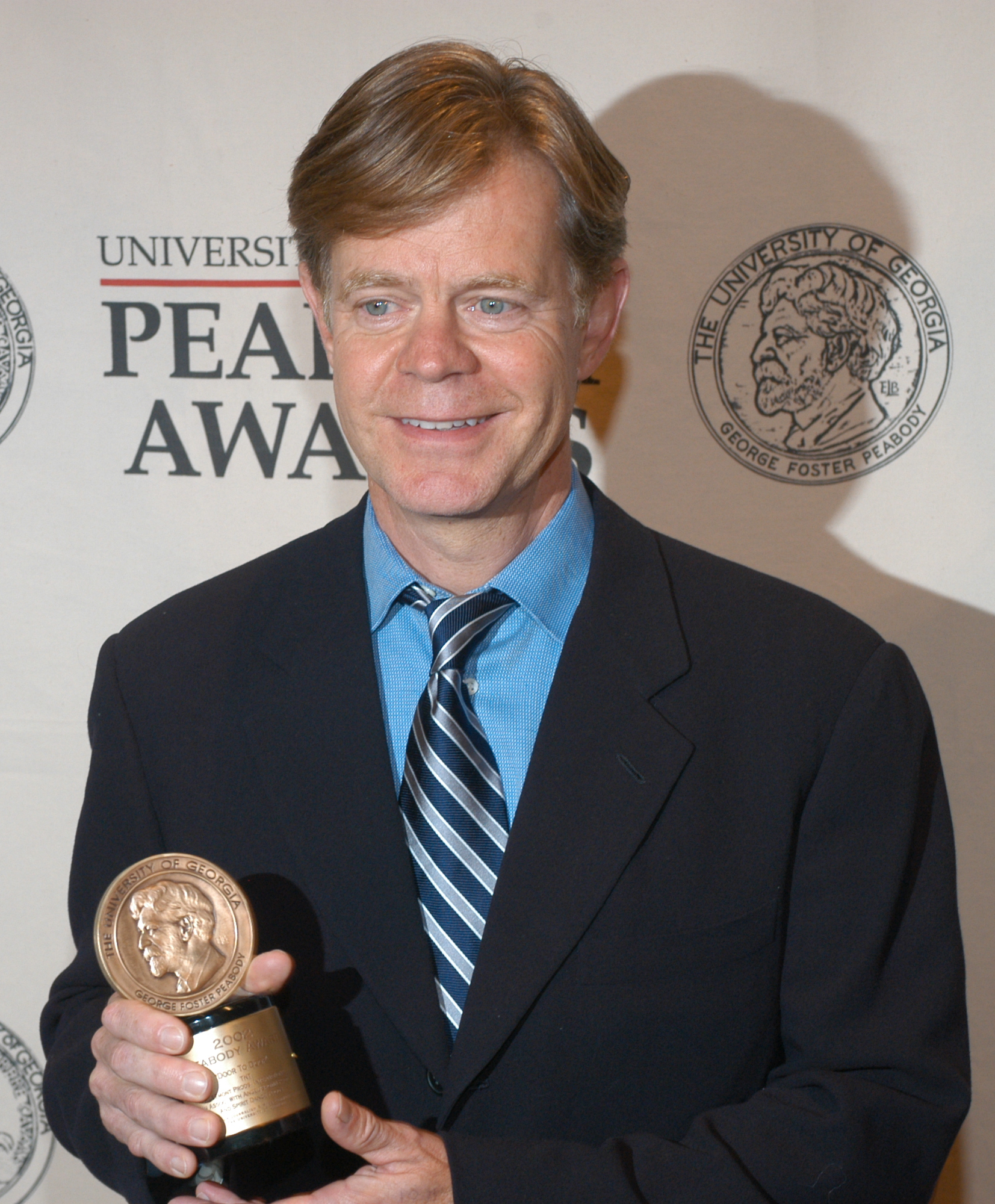
- Macy at the 2003 Peabody Awards
Awards and nominations
| Award | Wins | Nominations |
| Academy Awards | 0 | 1 |
| Emmy Awards | 2 | 15 |
| Golden Globe Awards | 0 | 5 |
| Screen Actors Guild Awards | 4 | 12 |

Totals (Note: Certain award groups do not simply award one winner. They acknowledge several different recipients, have runners-up, and have third place. Since this is a specific recognition and is different from losing an award, runner-up mentions are considered wins in this award tally. For simplification and to avoid errors, each award in this list has been presumed to have had a prior nomination.)
- Wins: 31
- Nominations: 76

William H. Macy is an American actor, director and screenwriter who has received various awards and nominations, including two Primetime Emmy Awards, four Screen Actors Guild Awards, an Academy Award nomination, and five nominations at the Golden Globe Awards.

At the beginning of his career, he starred in small independent films like Homicide (1991) and Oleanna (1994) that earned him nominations at the Independent Spirit Awards. He rose to fame with the critically acclaimed 1996 thriller film Fargo, for which he received nominations for the Academy Award for Best Supporting Actor, the Screen Actors Guild Award for Outstanding Performance by a Male Actor in a Supporting Role, and a win for the Independent Spirit Award for Best Male Lead. He was nominated for the Screen Actors Guild Award for Outstanding Performance by a Cast in a Motion Picture four times, as part of the ensembles of the films Boogie Nights (1997), Magnolia (1999), Seabiscuit (2003) and Bobby (2006).

Macy wrote and starred in the television films Door to Door (2002) and The Wool Cap (2004). For the former, he won two Primetime Emmy Awards, Outstanding Lead Actor in a Limited Series or Movie and Outstanding Writing for a Limited Series or Movie, a Satellite Award and a Screen Actors Guild Award for Outstanding Performance by a Male Actor in a Miniseries or Television Movie, and he was nominated for the Golden Globe Award for Best Actor – Miniseries or Television Film for both.

From 2011 to 2021, Macy played Frank Gallagher in the comedy-drama series Shameless, for which he was nominated for six Primetime Emmy Awards for Outstanding Lead Actor in a Comedy Series, two Golden Globe Awards for Best Actor – Television Series Musical or Comedy, and he won the Screen Actors Guild Award for Outstanding Performance by a Male Actor in a Comedy Series three times.

== Awards and nominations ==
=== Academy Awards ===
| Year | Category | Nominated work | Result | Ref. |
|---|---|---|---|---|
| 1996 | Best Supporting Actor | Fargo | Nominated | |

=== Actor Awards ===
| Year | Category | Nominated work | Result | Ref. |
|---|---|---|---|---|
| 1996 | Outstanding Actor in a Supporting Role | Fargo | Nominated | |
| 1997 | Outstanding Cast in a Motion Picture (Note: shared with the cast of the respective film) | Boogie Nights | Nominated | |
| 1999 | Outstanding Cast in a Motion Picture | Magnolia | Nominated | |
| 2002 | Outstanding Actor in a Miniseries or Television Movie | Door to Door | Won | |
| 2003 | Outstanding Cast in a Motion Picture | Seabiscuit | Nominated | |
| 2005 | Outstanding Actor in a Miniseries or Television Movie | The Wool Cap | Nominated | |
| 2006 | Outstanding Actor in a Miniseries or Television Movie | Nightmares & Dreamscapes | Nominated | |
| 2006 | Outstanding Cast in a Motion Picture | Bobby | Nominated | |
| 2014 | Outstanding Actor in a Comedy Series | Shameless | Won | |
| 2015 | Outstanding Actor in a Comedy Series | Shameless | Nominated | |
| 2016 | Outstanding Actor in a Comedy Series | Shameless | Won | |
| 2017 | Outstanding Actor in a Comedy Series | Shameless | Won | |

=== Critics' Choice Awards ===
| Year | Category | Nominated work | Result | Ref. |
Critics' Choice Movie Awards
| 2006 | Best Acting Ensemble | Bobby | Nominated | |
Critics' Choice Television Awards
| 2011 | Best Actor in a Drama Series | Shameless | Nominated | |

=== Emmy Awards ===
| Year | Category | Nominated work | Result | Ref. |
Primetime Emmy Awards
| 1997 | Outstanding Guest Actor in a Drama Series | E.R. | Nominated | |
| 2000 | Outstanding Guest Actor in a Comedy Series | Sports Night | Nominated | |
| 2000 | Outstanding Lead Actor in a Miniseries or a Movie | A Slight Case of Murder | Nominated | |
| 2003 | Outstanding Lead Actor in a Miniseries or a Movie | Door to Door | Won | |
| 2003 | Outstanding Writing for a Miniseries Series or Movie (Note: shared with Steven Schachter) | Door to Door | Won | |
| 2004 | Outstanding Supporting Actor in a Miniseries or a Movie | Stealing Sinatra | Nominated | |
| 2005 | Outstanding Television Movie (Note: shared with the producers of the television film) | The Wool Cap | Nominated | |
| 2005 | Outstanding Lead Actor in a Miniseries or a Movie | The Wool Cap | Nominated | |
| 2007 | Outstanding Lead Actor in a Miniseries or a Movie | Nightmares & Dreamscapes | Nominated | |
| 2014 | Outstanding Lead Actor in a Comedy Series | Shameless (episode: "Lazarus") | Nominated | |
| 2015 | Outstanding Lead Actor in a Comedy Series | Shameless (episode: "A Night to Remem... Wait, What?") | Nominated | |
| 2016 | Outstanding Lead Actor in a Comedy Series | Shameless (episode: "I Only Miss Her When I'm Breathing") | Nominated | |
| 2017 | Outstanding Lead Actor in a Comedy Series | Shameless (episode: "You Sold Me the Laundromat, Remember?") | Nominated | |
| 2018 | Outstanding Lead Actor in a Comedy Series | Shameless (episode: "Sleepwalking") | Nominated | |
| 2021 | Outstanding Lead Actor in a Comedy Series | Shameless (episode: "Father Frank, Full of Grace") | Nominated | |

=== Golden Globe Awards ===
| Year | Category | Nominated work | Result | Ref. |
|---|---|---|---|---|
| 2002 | Best Actor – Miniseries or Television Film | Door to Door | Nominated | |
| 2003 | Best Supporting Actor – Motion Picture | Seabiscuit | Nominated | |
| 2004 | Best Actor – Miniseries or Television Film | The Wool Cap | Nominated | |
| 2014 | Best Actor – Television Series Musical or Comedy | Shameless | Nominated | |
| 2017 | Best Actor – Television Series Musical or Comedy | Shameless | Nominated | |

== Miscellaneous awards ==
| Association | Year | Category | Project | Result | Ref. |
|---|---|---|---|---|---|
| American Comedy Awards | 1997 | Funniest Supporting Actor in a Motion Picture | Fargo | Won | |
| American Comedy Awards | 1999 | Funniest Supporting Actor in a Motion Picture | Pleasantville | Nominated | |
| American Comedy Awards | 2000 | Funniest Supporting Actor in a Motion Picture | Happy, Texas | Nominated | |
| Boston Society of Film Critics Awards | 1998 | Best Supporting Actor (Note: tied with Billy Bob Thornton for A Simple Plan) | Pleasantville | Won | |
| Chicago Film Critics Association Awards | 1997 | Best Actor | Fargo | Nominated | |
| Edgar Awards | 2000 | Best Television Feature or Miniseries | A Slight Case of Murder | Won | |
| Florida Film Critics Circle Awards | 1996 | Best Supporting Actor | Fargo | Runner-up | |
| Florida Film Critics Circle Awards | 1997 | Best Cast | Boogie Nights | Won | |
| Florida Film Critics Circle Awards | 2000 | Best Cast | Magnolia | Won | |
| Florida Film Critics Circle Awards | 2001 | Best Cast | State and Main | Won | |
| Hollywood Film Awards | 2006 | Ensemble of the Year | Bobby | Won | |
| Humanitas Prize | 2004 | 90 Minute or Longer Network or Syndicated Television | Door to Door | Nominated | |
| Independent Spirit Awards | 1992 | Best Supporting Male | Homicide | Nominated | |
| Independent Spirit Awards | 1995 | Best Male Lead | Oleanna | Nominated | |
| Independent Spirit Awards | 1997 | Best Male Lead | Fargo | Won | |
| Karlovy Vary International Film Festival Awards | 2002 | Best Actor | Focus | Won | |
| Mar del Plata International Film Festival Awards | 2006 | Best Actor | Edmond | Won | |
| National Board of Review Awards | 1999 | Best Cast | Magnolia | Won | |
| National Board of Review Awards | 2000 | Best Cast | State and Main | Won | |
| Online Film Critics Society Awards | 2000 | Best Ensemble (Note: tied with the cast of Almost Famous) | State and Main | Won | |
| People's Choice Awards | 2015 | Favorite Cable TV Actor | Shameless | Nominated | |
| Satellite Awards | 1997 | Best Actor – Motion Picture Drama | Fargo | Nominated | |
| Satellite Awards | 2000 | Best Supporting Actor – Motion Picture Musical or Comedy | Happy, Texas | Won | |
| Satellite Awards | 2000 | Best Actor – Miniseries or Television Film | A Slight Case of Murder | Won | |
| Satellite Awards | 2003 | Best Actor – Miniseries or Television Film | Door to Door | Won | |
| Satellite Awards | 2004 | Best Actor – Motion Picture Drama | The Cooler | Nominated | |
| Satellite Awards | 2005 | Best Supporting Actor – Miniseries or Television Film | Stealing Sinatra | Nominated | |
| Satellite Awards | 2011 | Best Actor – Television Series Drama | Shameless | Nominated | |
| Satellite Awards | 2014 | Best Actor – Television Series Musical or Comedy | Shameless | Nominated | |
| Satellite Awards | 2017 | Best Actor – Television Series Musical or Comedy | Shameless | Won | |
| Satellite Awards | 2018 | Best Actor – Television Series Musical or Comedy | Shameless | Won | |
| Satellite Awards | 2019 | Best Actor – Television Series Musical or Comedy | Shameless | Nominated | |
| ShoWest Convention Awards | 1999 | Supporting Actor of the Year | A Civil Action, Pleasantville, and Psycho | Won | |
| St. Louis Film Critics Association Awards | 2012 | Best Supporting Actor | The Sessions | Nominated | |
| Sundance Film Festival Awards | 2012 | Special Jury Prize for Ensemble Acting | The Sessions | Won | |
| Writers Guild of America Awards | 2003 | Outstanding Writing for a Long Form – Original | Door to Door | Nominated | |
| Writers Guild of America Awards | 2005 | Outstanding Writing for a Long Form – Adapted | The Wool Cap | Nominated | |

== Honorary awards ==
| Organizations | Year | Notes | Result | Ref. |
|---|---|---|---|---|
| Boston Film Festival Awards | 2002 | Excellence Award | Honored | |
| Catalina Film Festival Awards | 2014 | Stanley Kramer Social Artist Award | Honored | |
| Cinequest San Jose Film Festival Awards | 2003 | Maverick Tribute Award | Honored | |
| Denver Film Festival Awards | 2003 | John Cassavetes Award | Honored | |
