= Water engine (disambiguation) =

Water engine is a simple water-driven device such as a water-column engine.

Water engine may also refer to:

- Stanley Meyer's water fuel cell, an invention claiming to run an automobile using water as fuel
- Water motors, a type of hydraulic machinery
- The Water Engine, a 1977 play by David Mamet
- The Water Engine (film), a 1992 television film based on the play
