= The Glass Menagerie (1973 film) =

1973 ABC television film

- DVD cover
- Genre: Drama
- Based on: The Glass Menagerie by Tennessee Williams
- Directed by: Anthony Harvey
- Starring: Katharine Hepburn; Sam Waterston; Joanna Miles; Michael Moriarty
- Music by: John Barry
- Country of origin: United States
- Original language: English

Production
- Producers: Cecil F. Ford; David Susskind
- Cinematography: Billy Williams
- Editor: John Bloom
- Running time: 100 minutes
- Production companies: Norton Simon Inc. Talent Associates

Original release
- Network: ABC
- Release: December 16, 1973

The Glass Menagerie is a 1973 American drama television film based on the 1944 play of the same name by Tennessee Williams. It is directed by Anthony Harvey and stars Katharine Hepburn, Sam Waterston, Joanna Miles and Michael Moriarty. It marked the third screen adaptation of the play. It originally aired on ABC as part of the network's ABC Theater series.

The Glass Menagerie was Katharine Hepburn's first appearance on television. She had initially been wary of the medium, but was convinced by the opportunity to work with friend Anthony Harvey, with whom she had made the successful film The Lion in Winter. Hepburn was also drawn to the project when she was told her niece Katharine Houghton could co-star as Laura, but Houghton eventually turned down the role.

The Glass Menagerie was one of the major television events of 1973, commanding high ratings. It received four Primetime Emmy Awards.

== Cast ==
- Katharine Hepburn as Amanda Wingfield, the ex-Southern belle who has been abandoned by her husband and longs for the kind of Old South gentility and comforts which she remembers from her youth for her children.
- Sam Waterston as Tom Wingfield, Amanda's son who works in a warehouse but aspires to be a writer. He feels both obligated toward yet burdened by his family.
- Joanna Miles as Laura Wingfield, Amanda's shy and extra-sensitive daughter.
- Michael Moriarty as Jim O'Connor, a workmate of Tom's who is invited to the Wingfields' house for dinner with the intent of being Laura's first gentleman caller.

== Wins and nominations ==
At the 26th Primetime Emmy Awards:

- Win for Best Supporting Actor in a Miniseries or Movie - Michael Moriarty
- Win for Best Supporting Actress in a Miniseries or Movie - Joanna Miles
- Nomination for Best Actress in a Miniseries or Movie - Katharine Hepburn
- Nomination for Best Supporting Actor in a Drama - Sam Waterston

At the 1974 Directors Guild of America Awards:

- Nomination for Outstanding Directorial Achievement in Movies for Television - Anthony Harvey

== See also ==
- List of American films of 1973
