= The Water Engine =

1977 play by David Mamet

- Original language: English
- Written by: David Mamet
- Characters: Charles Lang; Rita; Morton Gross; Lawrence Oberman; Mrs. Varěc; Mr. Wallace; Bernie; Dave Murray
- Genre: Drama
- Setting: Chicago, 1934

Premiere
- Date: 1977
- Place: Off-Broadway

The Water Engine is a 1977 play by David Mamet that centers on the violent suppression of a disruptive alternative energy technology.

== Plot ==
Charles Lang works at a menial job at a factory and lives with his blind sister Rita in an apartment in Chicago during the 1934 Century of Progress world's fair. He is also an amateur inventor, and the play centers around a machine he designs that can create electricity from distilled water. Seeking to patent his idea, he finds a lawyer, Morton Gross, in the phone book and shows him the machine, but Gross's motivations seem to differ from Lang's. Gross recruits another lawyer, Lawrence Oberman, and together they menace Lang and eventually his sister. It is heavily implied that the two of them serve the corporate establishment whose profits Lang's engine threatens.

By the time Lang realizes he is being taken advantage of, the lawyers have him trapped. He attempts to contact a newspaper reporter, but Gross and Oberman hold his sister hostage to prevent him from telling his story. He then meets a barker at the World's Fair right before it closes for the night who tells him of a chain letter he has just received, which gives him an idea.

The lawyers try to force Lang into giving them his plans, but he says he no longer has them; the audience finds out from a scene in the newspaper reporter's office that he and Rita have been killed. The play ends with Bernie, a young friend of the family who has previously shown mechanical aptitude, receiving the plans for the Water Engine in the mail.

== Themes ==
The Century of Progress theme of the 1934 Chicago World's Fair informs that of the play. Technology is interspersed throughout the dialogue as the voices of various announcing figures, over radios, on physical soapboxes, and, in the case of the Chain Letter, of indeterminate origin, reinforce the notion of a rising tide of change as they herald the advent of a new technological era. The superstition represented by the Chain Letter contrasts with its eventual saving of Lang's invention and yet also coincides with it, as both the inventor and the letter seek explanations and justice in a world that often—particularly in the cases of both the lawyers, the knowingly bombastic newspaper reporter Dave Murray, and the Fair itself—seems more intent on flowery rhetoric than on the pursuit of truth or the greatest good of society.

The play plays with the form of daytime radio serials, as its plot and structure, with clearly defined heroes and antagonists, riffs off the suspense thrillers that were popular around the time the play is set. That it was originally written as a radio play positions it as an homage to the genre.

== Production ==
Originally written as a radio play for the NPR drama showcase Earplay, The Water Engine was first staged at The St. Nicholas Theater in Chicago and later at The Public Theater in New York by Steven Schachter. It opened on December 20, 1977 and ran for 63 performances. The cast included Dwight Schultz as Charles Lang, David Sabin as Morton Gross, and Bill Moor as Lawrence Oberman. On February 28, 1978, it transferred to the Plymouth Theatre on Broadway as a double-bill with a short Mamet play entitled Mr. Happiness, and ran for 24 performances. In this production Patti LuPone was featured as Rita. The play was nominated for the Drama Desk Award for Outstanding New Play.

The play was adapted by Mamet, Steven Bognar, Julia Reichert, and Martin Goldstein for a 1992 made-for-cable television movie produced by Donald P. Borchers, directed by Steven Schachter and starring William H. Macy as Charles Lang, John Mahoney as Mason (instead of Morton) Gross, Joe Mantegna as Lawrence Oberman, and Patti LuPone as Rita. Charles Durning, Treat Williams, Andrea Marcovicci, Peter Michael Goetz, Rebecca Pidgeon, Felicity Huffman, Ricky Jay, and Joanna Miles also were in the cast. It was produced by Amblin Television and broadcast by TNT.

== See also ==
- Water-fuelled car
