= Delta County, U.S.A. =

- Genre: Drama
- Written by: Thomas Rickman
- Directed by: Glenn Jordan
- Starring: Peter Donat; Jeff Conaway; Robert Hays; Joanna Miles; Peter Masterson; Joe Penny; Lola Albright
- Music by: Jack Elliott; Allyn Ferguson
- Country of origin: United States
- Original language: English

Production
- Executive producer: Leonard Goldberg
- Producers: Robert Greenwald; Frank von Zerneck
- Cinematography: William Cronjager
- Editors: Gordon Scott; Dick Wormell
- Running time: 100 minutes
- Production company: Paramount Television

Original release
- Network: ABC
- Release: May 20, 1977

Delta County, U.S.A. is a 1977 American made-for-television drama film directed by Glenn Jordan and starring Peter Donat, Jeff Conaway, Robert Hays, Joanna Miles, Lola Albright, Peter Masterson, Michele Carey and Morgan Brittany. The film originally served as a pilot for a proposed prime time television soap opera that never materialized. It was broadcast as The ABC Friday Night Movie on May 20, 1977.

== Synopsis ==
Delta County is set in a Southern community caught between the old traditions and a rapidly changing way of life. For teenagers Terry Nicholas, his sister McCain, and Joe Ed, the boy from the wrong side of the tracks that she's attracted to, the old traditions have little meaning in their lives. Their elders, struggling to preserve values of an older day, have personal problems that are sometimes overwhelming, such as the one facing John McCain Jr. an alcoholic whose wife Kate is having a forbidden, toxic romance that sets her husband off on a vengeance-seeking spree.

== Cast ==
- Peter Donat as John McCain Jr.
- Jeff Conaway as Terry Nicholas
- Robert Hays as Bo
- Joanna Miles as Kate McCain Nicholas
- Lola Albright as Dossie Wilson
- Jim Antonio as Jack the Bear
- Peter Masterson as Billy Wingate
- Doney Oatman as McCain Nicholas
- Joe Penny as Joe Ed
- Tisch Raye as Robbie Jean
- Morgan Brittany as Doris Ann
- Sandy McPeak as Chief Doughly
- Michele Carey as Jonsie Wilson
