= Kalifornia =

1993 film by Dominic Sena

- Theatrical release poster
- Directed by: Dominic Sena
- Screenplay by: Tim Metcalfe
- Story by: Stephen Levy; Tim Metcalfe
- Produced by: Steve Golin; Aristides McGarry; Sigurjón Sighvatsson
- Starring: Brad Pitt; Juliette Lewis; David Duchovny; Michelle Forbes
- Cinematography: Bojan Bazelli
- Edited by: Martin Hunter
- Music by: Carter Burwell
- Production companies: PolyGram Filmed Entertainment; Propaganda Films; Viacom Pictures
- Distributed by: Gramercy Pictures
- Release dates: August 27, 1993 (Montreal World Film Festival); September 3, 1993 (U.S.)
- Running time: 117 minutes
- Country: United States
- Language: English
- Budget: $8.5 million
- Box office: $2.4 million

Kalifornia is a 1993 American independent road psychological thriller film directed by Dominic Sena in his feature film directorial debut. It stars Brad Pitt, Juliette Lewis, David Duchovny, and Michelle Forbes. The film tells the story of a Pennsylvania graduate student and journalist (Duchovny) and his photographer girlfriend (Forbes) traveling cross-country researching serial killings for a book, who unwittingly carpool with a Kentucky psychopathic redneck parolee (Pitt) and his childlike waitress girlfriend (Lewis).

Filmed in Georgia and rural inland California in the spring of 1992, Kalifornia premiered at the Montreal World Film Festival on August 27, 1993, where it was awarded two competition prizes. It was released theatrically the following week in the United States, but was a box office bomb, grossing $2.4 million against a nearly $9 million budget. The film received mixed reviews from critics, with some praising its art house sensibility, while others dismissed it as a violent exploitation film. Despite this, the film's acting was largely praised, and critic Roger Ebert heralded the performances of Pitt and Lewis among the best he had ever seen. The film was nominated for three Saturn Awards in 1994, including for Best Horror Film.

== Plot ==
In Pittsburgh, Pennsylvania, Brian Kessler is a graduate student and journalist whose article about serial killers has gotten him an offer for a book deal. He and his girlfriend Carrie Laughlin, an avant garde photographer, decide to relocate to California in hopes of enriching their careers. The two plot their journey from Pittsburgh to Los Angeles, planning to visit infamous murder sites along the way that Carrie can photograph for Brian's book. Short on funds, Brian posts a ride-share ad on the university campus.

Meanwhile in Louisville, Kentucky, psychopathic parolee Early Grayce has lost his job at a mirror factory. His parole officer learns of this and comes to the trailer park where Early lives with his naïve girlfriend Adele Corners. Early refuses the officer's offer of a job as a janitor at the university, saying he wants to leave the state, but the officer pressures him into keeping his appointment for the job interview. When Early arrives at the campus, he sees the ride-share ad and calls Brian, who agrees to meet him the following day. Early sends Adele ahead, then murders his landlord and sets his trailer on fire. Carrie is reluctant about riding with the couple given their rough appearance, but Brian encourages her to give them a chance. On the road, unbeknown to his companions, Early murders a man in a gas-station bathroom and steals his money.

At a hotel, Early invites Brian out to play pool, leaving Adele and Carrie alone together. Adele explains that her mother did not approve of her relationship because Early had just been released from prison. She reveals to Carrie that she suffered a gang rape and views Early as her protector, even though he sometimes "punishes" her. While the women drink beer, Adele admits that Early forbids her to smoke or drink. Meanwhile, at a bar, Early assaults a man who confronts Brian. Later during the road-trip, he introduces Brian to pistol shooting in a remote location.

Carrie is alarmed by Brian's fascination with Early and by his nonchalant response to the news that Early is a convicted felon. After catching Early and Adele having sex in the car, she gives Brian an ultimatum: either they rid themselves of the pair, or she will leave. At a desert gas station, Carrie glimpses a news report about Early being a suspected murderer. Early kills the gas station attendant in front of Carrie and continues the trip with the couple as hostages. At an abandoned mine camp, the party encounter two police officers whom Early shoots and kills. They next come to the home of an elderly couple in the desert. Early beats the man to death, but Adele allows the woman to flee.

When Early confronts Adele about freeing the woman, she hits him in the face with a cactus and chastises him, after which he shoots her to death. He then knocks Brian unconscious before kidnapping Carrie, driving her to the abandoned Dreamland nuclear testing site on the California-Nevada border. Early forces Carrie to dress in Adele's clothes, and the film implies that he rapes her off-camera. Brian regains consciousness, and the elderly woman gives him the keys to her truck. He follows Early to the test site and attacks him, hitting him in the face with a shovel. Brian finds Carrie, who appears to be in shock, handcuffed to a bed in an abandoned house. Early, who was only stunned, attacks Brian and they struggle. Early is hit over the head by Carrie with the limb from a nuclear test mannequin. When he continues the attack, Brian shoots and kills him.

Some time later, Brian and Carrie are living in an oceanfront house in Malibu. As Brian sifts through tapes made with his voice recorder during their trip, Carrie tells him that a gallery in Venice is interested in her art. Brian suggests that they go out to celebrate. As they depart, he unintentionally leaves a recording running, which reveals a "thank you" message Adele covertly left at the end of a tape.

== Cast ==
- Brad Pitt as Early Grayce
- David Duchovny as Brian Kessler
- Juliette Lewis as Adele Corners
- Michelle Forbes as Carrie Laughlin
- James Michael McDougal as John Diebold
- Mars Callahan as Walter Livesy
- Brett Rice as Police Officer
- Loanne Bishop as Police Officer
- John Dullaghan as Mr. Musgrave
- Sierra Pecheur as Mrs. Musgrave

== Critical analysis ==
In Lost Highways: An Illustrated History of Road Movies writers Jack Sargeant and Stephanie Watson note that the film presents doubled images of the two couples, "contrary rituals of affirmation" between Early and Adele, and Brian and Carrie, which demonstrate their social and class-related disparities. Sargeant and Watson also interpret the character of Carrie as an androgyne that "offers a threat to order" in the dynamics among Early, Adele, and Brian.

Film scholar Charles Derry views Kalifornia as part of a historical trend of serial killer films released in the early 1990s, popularized by the success of Jonathan Demme's The Silence of the Lambs (1991).

== Production ==
=== Conception ===
Originally titled California, the script was written by Tim Metcalfe with Stephen Levy in 1987. Metcalfe later commented their intentions were "to scare an audience, to comment on our national obsession with 'true crime' stories, and to punish myself for my morbid preoccupation with the subject of murder and murderers." The script was optioned in November 1990 by Propaganda Films, by request of director Dominic Sena. Sena would go on to mention his positive impression on the script was mainly based on the premise and the character of Early Grayce.

Between November 1990 and March 1991, Metcalfe completed two rewrites of the script to implement changes requested by Sena and Propaganda Films. The characters of Brian and Carrie were given professions as a writer and a photographer, respectively, while retaining the original premise to share a ride with a serial killer. Metcalfe disagreed on the direction the script was being developed, while Sena and the producers found his rewrites "uninspiring". In March 1991, Metcalfe was fired from the project.

Without the budget to hire another writer, Sena, along with his two producers, spent another year writing ten subsequent drafts of the script. Their contributions included the voice-over narration of the character of Brian, along with a change of tone from a black comedy to a more violent thriller. Sena maintained the rewrites helped them to secure the cast, as well as an increase to the originally proposed budget of $4.5 million.

=== Casting ===
Brad Pitt was cast as the violent Early Grayce, as he had been seeking out a role that was at odds with the wholesome "pretty boy" image he had portrayed in Thelma & Louise (1991) and A River Runs Through It (1992). Juliette Lewis was cast in the role while still completing production on Martin Scorsese's Cape Fear (1991), and had been in a relationship with Pitt at the time. In the role of Carrie, Michelle Forbes was cast after she completed an audition in Los Angeles, as Sena felt she possessed the cool aloofness of the character. The role of Brian Kessler was the last to be cast, with David Duchovny ultimately receiving the role after several screen tests with Pitt, Lewis, and Forbes.

=== Filming ===
Filming of Kalifornia began in the late spring of 1992. Some of the film's early scenes were shot in an old industrial area west of downtown Atlanta and in the Castleberry Hill neighborhood, after which the production moved westward through various locations in California. On June 28, 1992, while filming at a gas station in rural California, the production was temporarily halted following a 7.5 magnitude earthquake.

Sena recalled the shoot being extremely difficult, with the shooting schedule sometimes allowing only one day in certain locations. According to Sena, throughout the production, Pitt and Lewis, who were a couple at the time, would go home and work on lines together during the evenings. Producer Steve Golin recounted during the shoot that "all four of [the main cast] have been so pro, I've been impressed. They have been working ridiculous hours under conditions that are not star-like. The hotels in the desert are not luxurious; they get a room with a swamp cooler, they don't even have air conditioning. It's a rough show."

=== Writing ===
Screenwriter Tim Metcalfe has expressed strong dissatisfaction with the final version of Kalifornia, stating that his original screenplay, co-written with Stephen Levy, was intended as a dark comedy with Hitchcockian suspense rather than a violent thriller. According to Metcalfe, director Dominic Sena significantly altered the tone of the film, introducing what he described as gratuitous and cartoonish violence reminiscent of Quentin Tarantino's filmmaking style. He cited specific scenes—such as a graphic murder in a gas station bathroom and a brutal attempted rape—as examples of how the film diverged from the more subtle and psychologically driven original script. Metcalfe also criticized Sena's decision to eliminate ambiguity around the character of Early, revealing him too quickly as a violent psychopath. He has publicly stated that, aside from Juliette Lewis’s performance, which he praised, he remains highly critical of the film and its director.

== Soundtrack ==
A soundtrack CD for the film was released by Polydor Records on August 3, 1993.

Kalifornia - Original Soundtrack

Soundtrack album by Various
- Released: August 3, 1993
- Genre: Various
- Length: 55:42
- Label: Polydor
- Producer: Various

Professional ratings
Review scores
Source	Rating
Allmusic	2/5 stars

No.	Title	Writer(s)	Artist(s)	Length
1.	"Do You Need Some?"	Matt Mercado	Mind Bomb	6:25
2.	"Unfulfilled"	Quicksand	Quicksand	3:23
3.	"Deep"	Tony Mortimer	East 17	4:04
4.	"When You Come Back"	Kevn Kinney; Tim Nielson; Jeff Sullivan; Buren Fowler	Drivin N Cryin	3:00
5.	"No One Said It Would Be Easy"	Sheryl Crow; Bill Bottrell; Kevin Gilbert; Dan Schwartz	Sheryl Crow	5:29
6.	"I Love the World"	Angelique Bianca	The Indians	5:36
7.	"Lettuce and Vodka"	Exene Cervenka; John Doe; Duke McVinnie	X	5:05
8.	"Accelerator"	Andrew Cairns; Fyfe Ewing; Michael McKeegan	Therapy?	2:08
9.	"Born for Love"	David Baerwald	David Baerwald	6:17
10.	"Dive Bomber"	Sean Dickson	Soup Dragons	2:44
11.	"Look Up to the Sky"	Angelique Bianca	The Indians	7:20
12.	"Kalifornia/Cactus Girl"	Carter Burwell	Carter Burwell	4:11

Additional songs
Other songs featured in the film that are not included on the soundtrack include "89 Lines" by Daniel O'Brien, "Seven Days" by Hugh Harris, "Playin' in the Dirt" by Heather Myles, "Strong Enough" by Sheryl Crow, "Come Home" by Pere Ubu, "(Get Your Kicks on) Route 66" by Asleep at the Wheel, "Symphony No. 8 in F Major Op. 93" by Ludwig van Beethoven and Brad Pitt partially singing part of "Free Bird" by Lynyrd Skynyrd.

== Release ==
=== Box office ===
After premiering at the Montreal World Film Festival in August 1993, Kalifornia was released theatrically in the United States on September 3, 1993 at 359 theaters. The film was a box office bomb, only grossing $2,395,231 against an $8.5 million budget. The film opened at number 17 at the U.S. box office during its opening weekend with a $1.1 million gross, averaging $3,228 per theater.

=== Critical response ===
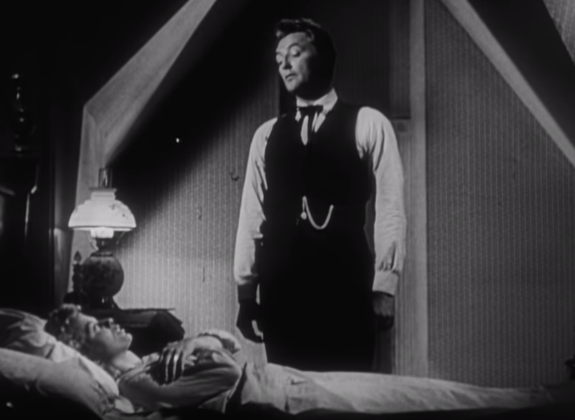
The film and Pitt's performance was compared to The Night of the Hunter (1955) and Robert Mitchum's performance in that film.

Kalifornia received generally mixed reviews. It holds a 59% rating on Rotten Tomatoes and an average score of 6.2/10, sampled from 32 reviews. The site's consensus reads: "Visually strong and featuring a potently feral performance from Brad Pitt, Kalifornia is a tonally uneven thriller marked by all-too-obvious themes". On Metacritic, the film has a score of 49 out of 100, determined from 17 critics' reviews, signifying "mixed or average" reviews. Film scholar Robert Cettl noted in his book Serial Killer Cinema that, upon its release, "Kalifornia was both praised as an insightful demystification of the serial killer, and vilified as a glorification of nihilistic violence."

Roger Ebert of the Chicago Sun-Times lauded the film, awarding it a full four stars and describing it as "unflinchingly honest, and so well acted that for most of the film I abandoned any detachment and just watched it as if I were observing the lives of real people." Ebert went on to note that Pitt and Lewis give "two of the most harrowing and convincing performances I've ever seen." Leonard Klady of Variety also praised the performances of the lead cast and likened the film to Charles Laughton's The Night of the Hunter (1955), deeming it "an extremely handsome production imbued with a chilling, surrealistic sensibility." Janet Maslin of The New York Times described the film as "an exercise in contrasting personalities, with Ms. Lewis's Adele by far the most arresting," but added that the film "is indeed good-looking, with its striking desert landscapes nicely photographed by Bojan Bazelli, and with costumes by Kelle Kutsugaras that say everything -- and more -- about the people who wear them. If looks were everything, maybe they'd be on the right track."

Richard Harrington of The Washington Post heralded the film's aesthetic elements, writing that it "is so beautifully filmed by Bojan Bazelli, and so skillfully edited, that its art house surface belies its exploitation content, making this a trip through a cool world rather than a cruel one." The Chicago Tribune's Gene Siskel echoed a similar sentiment regarding the relationship between the film's artistic merit and its representation of violence, noting: "[Kalifornia is] yet another terribly violent film about a serial killer. And although the script suffers from an ending that doesn't have that much to say that's fresh about remorseless murderers, the trip is worth taking because we meet four indelible characters in one compelling scene after another." Joe Brown of The Washington Post was dismissive of the film on the grounds of its violent material, deeming it a "new nadir in nauseating nihilism". Writing for the Los Angeles Times, Kenneth Turan noted that though the film is visually "slick and stylish", it "doesn't make the encroaching mayhem any easier to take," and felt that the performances of Pitt and Lewis registered as "mannered and even a trifle repetitive".

Some critics, such as Peter Travers of Rolling Stone, felt certain elements of the script were "preposterous", while the Chicago Tribune's Mark Caro deemed it a "pretentious B movie". Owen Gleiberman of Entertainment Weekly made similar criticisms, writing that, "from its inception, Kalifornia... throws all dramatic sense out the window," and ultimately described it as a "a film-school thesis gone disastrously wrong." Owen McNally of the Hartford Courant, though praising of the performances, wrote: "If you hop aboard this sick, unjoyful ride, you'd better bail out early. Unsafe at any speed, this dramatic vehicle goes up in flames, consumed by a lethally defective mix of pomposity and pretension."

=== Home media ===
PolyGram Home Video first released Kalifornia on VHS and DVD on November 18, 1997. The DVD edition featured both unrated and theatrical cuts of the film in pan and scan and widescreen aspect ratios. Metro-Goldwyn-Mayer (MGM) Home Entertainment released the film again on DVD in 2000 before reissuing the unrated cut alone on Blu-ray and DVD in August 2010. On March 5, 2019, Shout! Factory released a 2-disc special edition Blu-ray of the film under their Shout! Select label, featuring both the unrated and theatrical cuts, as well as a new interview with director Dominic Sena. This edition marks the first time the theatrical cut has been made available on Blu-ray. Additionally, an unrated version of the film was also released on LaserDisc in widescreen format.

== Accolades ==
Award/association	Date of ceremony	Category	Recipient(s) and nominee(s)	Result	Ref.
Montreal World Film Festival	September 7, 1993	Best Artistic Contribution	Dominic Sena	Won	
Montreal World Film Festival	September 7, 1993	FIPRESCI Prize	Dominic Sena	Won	
Saturn Awards	October 20, 1994	Best Horror Film	Kalifornia	Nominated	
Saturn Awards	October 20, 1994	Best Actress	Michelle Forbes	Nominated	
Saturn Awards	October 20, 1994	Best Writing	Tim Metcalfe	Nominated	

== Related works ==
Following the completion of the film, DC Comics commissioned a comic book adaptation from writer Chuck Dixon and artist Duncan Fegredo. Fegredo recalled the 32-page adaptation was planned to be released as a supplementary for the film's video release. The adaptation was never published, though it got as far as the completion of some coloring work done by Danny Vozzo. Fegredo has speculated this was due to the demise of Gramercy Pictures, a production company involved handling the rights. An uncolored version, complete with Fegredo's original cover art, has since been uploaded to the Internet.

== Sources ==
- Cettl, Robert (2003). Serial Killer Cinema: An Analytical Filmography with an Introduction. Jefferson, North Carolina: McFarland. ISBN 978-0-786-41292-1.
- Derry, Charles (2009). Dark Dreams 2.0: A Psychological History of the Modern Horror Film from the 1950s to the 21st Century. Jefferson, North Carolina: McFarland. ISBN 978-0-786-43397-1.
- Sargeant, Jack; Watson, Stephanie (1999). Lost Highways: An Illustrated History of Road Movies. London: Creation. ISBN 978-1-871-59268-9.
