= A Fire in the Sky =

1978 television film directed by Jerry Jameson

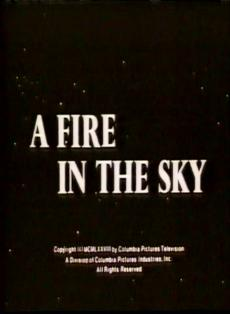
- Title card
- Genre: drama, sci-fi
- Teleplay by: Dennis Nemec; Michael Blankfort
- Story by: Paul Gallico
- Directed by: Jerry Jameson
- Starring: Richard Crenna; Elizabeth Ashley; David Dukes; Joanna Miles; Lloyd Bochner; Merlin Olsen; Andrew Duggan
- Theme music composer: Paul Chihara
- Country of origin: United States
- Original language: English

Production
- Executive producer: Bill Driskill
- Producer: Hugh Benson
- Production locations: Sonoran Desert; Phoenix, Arizona; Tucson, Arizona
- Cinematography: Matthew F. Leonetti
- Editor: J. Terry Williams
- Running time: 150 minutes
- Production companies: NBC; Bill Driskill Productions; Columbia Pictures Television

Original release
- Network: NBC
- Release: November 26, 1978

A Fire in the Sky is a made-for-television disaster movie that debuted on NBC on November 26, 1978. The movie is based on a story by Paul Gallico where the earth is threatened by a large comet, which impacts near Phoenix and causes massive destruction there. It is a Bill Driskill Production in association with Columbia Pictures Television.

== Plot ==
While reviewing pictures of the planet Jupiter, astronomer Jennifer Dreiser discovers a new comet streaking through space. The joy of finding the comet is short-lived, however, when it is determined that it may hit the Earth in just eight days. Dreiser is summoned to see the President at his vacation home, along with a number of other experts, to discuss the situation. Astronomer Jason Voight, a specialist in near-Earth objects, shocks the group by telling them that the comet will hit within 50 miles of Phoenix. Voight urges the President to order an evacuation of Phoenix and the surrounding area, but the President ultimately leaves that decision in the hands of Arizona's governor, Michael Ritchie. The President does order the nuclear warheads of a Minuteman ICBM to be launched into space aboard a Titan-Centaur rocket, so that an attempt can be made at destroying the comet.

After talking with the President, Governor Ritchie meets with a number of key people, including his chief of staff Elliott Kirkwood, insurance executive Paul Gilliam, newspaper owner David Allan, and emergency management officer Wayne Lustus. David's wife, television station owner Sharon Allan, gets wind of the meeting, but is unable to get David to tell her what's going on. Ultimately, Sharon asks Carol, a reporter at David's newspaper with whom David is having an affair, to find out.

Voight is adamant that the people be told what is going to happen to Phoenix. Sharon Allan is the only media person in town who is willing to discuss the issue with him. Ultimately, Voight convinces her to put him on the air and describes what will happen when the comet hits. Voight's broadcast has one desired effect—people begin leaving the city for safety. But it also leads to businesses being looted. Governor Ritchie instructs Elliott to report the broadcast to the Federal Communications Commission, in an effort to get Sharon's television station's license to broadcast revoked.

The U.S. Air Force's attempt to intercept the comet is broadcast on national television. Both of the nuclear warheads detonate behind the comet's nucleus, in its tail. Once it has been confirmed that the comet is still on course to hit the Earth, the network broadcast is interrupted with instructions from Civil Defense urging citizens of Phoenix to begin leaving the area immediately. Governor Ritchie, now understanding the real danger posed by the comet, resolves to withdraw the FCC protest against Sharon's station, and he takes to the TV to urge people to evacuate the city.

On the day of the comet's impact, Voight tells Jennifer to meet him in Tucson, so that they can go off to Mexico together. Jennifer begs him to go directly to Tucson with her, but he insists on taking some scientific equipment to the comet's projected impact point, to record atmospheric and seismic data from the impact. When he gets to the impact area, in the desert outside the city, he finds a large group of Pima Indians whose truck has broken down. Voight calls for help on his Citizens Band radio and is promised that helicopters will pick them up as soon as possible. Not knowing if the help is really going to come, Voight gives the keys to his car to one of the adults in the stranded group, and after packing all the young children into the car, gives the man instructions to head away from the impact zone.

Evacuees clog the roads leading out of Phoenix, and many of them pour into Sky Harbor Airport to catch flights out of the city. These people include Paul Gilliam, his wife Ellen, and their daughter Paula. When her parents leave their car to go into the airport terminal, Paula stays behind to look for some jewelry her mother has forgotten. This gives Paula the opportunity to get back to her boyfriend, Tom Reardon, a rough-and-tumble college student with whom she has a romantic relationship and of whom her father disapproves. Tom's grandmother refuses to leave her home and Tom is unwilling to leave her to face the comet's impact alone, so Tom, Mrs. Reardon, and Paula begin preparing for the coming disaster.

In the hours before impact, Stan Webster, who is leading a group of young boys including his nine-year-old son, Danny on a survival hike, finds out about the comet over the radio. With no shelter immediately available, Webster and the boys dig themselves into the desert floor and cover themselves with sleeping bags in a desperate attempt to survive the impact. Governor Ritchie and Elliott try to fly out of Phoenix, but air traffic controllers refuse them clearance. Elliott orders the pilot to fly them out, which the pilot reluctantly tries to do. Their small aircraft is destroyed after hitting a larger commercial plane, tearing the landing gear off the commercial plane and forcing it to be diverted to San Diego. Meanwhile, Ann Webster, who has been in the family station wagon looking for her husband and son, has broken down in the desert and takes cover in a drainage ditch. Tom, Mrs. Reardon, and Paula take cover in the farmhouse's cellar. David Allan, who had been drafted to help evacuate patients from a local hospital, takes refuge with them in the basement of a bank building downtown. Sharon Allan, who keeps her television station on the air until the last possible moment, rushes to the lowest levels of a parking garage with several members of her staff in the moments before impact. Jennifer Dreiser arrives safely in Tucson before the comet hits.

Helicopters never arrive to airlift Voight and the stranded Pima Indian adults out of the impact zone. As the comet makes its final approach, Voight looks up and sees the fire in the sky that he had warned so many people about. He and the others are all incinerated when the comet strikes. Strong winds and earth tremors devastate Phoenix. The bank building's basement, though rattled by the impact, holds up and David and everyone else inside survive. Sharon is abandoned by her colleagues when they think the parking garage is going to cave in. One of them eventually makes it to the bank building for medical treatment after the impact and tells David where Sharon is. David finds Sharon amidst the rubble of the garage, and after a tearful reunion, they vow to work on their struggling marriage. The Reardons and Paula survive too, though the Reardons' home is destroyed. Stan Webster and his son, riding to a refugee center with the rest of their hiking group through the desert in the back of a military truck, spot Ann Webster walking along with a small group of survivors. They jump off the truck and greet her with hugs, happy that she survived the impact.

== Cast ==
- Richard Crenna as Jason Voight
- Elizabeth Ashley as Sharon Allan
- David Dukes as David Allan
- Joanna Miles as Jennifer Dreiser
- Lloyd Bochner as Paul Gilliam
- Merlin Olsen as Stan Webster
- Andrew Duggan as The President
- Maggie Wellman as Carol
- Nicolas Coster as The Governor (Michael Ritchie)
- Kip Niven as Elliott
- William Bogert as Lustus
- Jenny O'Hara as Ann Webster
- Michael Biehn as Tom Reardon
- Diana Douglas as Mrs. Reardon
- Cindy Eilbacher as Paula Gilliam
- Bill Williams as Dale Turner
- Roy Gaintner as Dr. Jesse

== Production ==
Owners of the Hyatt Regency Phoenix unsuccessfully attempted to block the sale of an architectural model of the building to be destroyed for the production. The fictional destruction of the building figured heavily in the film and commercials.

== In other media ==
Novelization of A Fire in the Sky, written by Walter Kendrick.

A novelization of A Fire in the Sky was also released in 1978. It was written by Walter Kendrick and published by Tempo Books.

== Award nominations ==
A Fire in the Sky earned Primetime Emmy Award nominations for Outstanding Achievement in Film Sound Editing and Outstanding Individual Achievement - Creative Technical Crafts.
