= Bug (1975 film) =

1975 film directed by Jeannot Szwarc

- Theatrical release poster
- Directed by: Jeannot Szwarc
- Written by: William Castle; Thomas Page
- Based on: The Hephaestus Plague (1973 novel) by Thomas Page
- Produced by: William Castle
- Starring: Bradford Dillman; Joanna Miles; Richard Gilliland; Jamie Smith-Jackson
- Cinematography: Michel Hugo
- Edited by: Allan Jacobs
- Music by: Charles Fox
- Production company: William Castle Productions
- Distributed by: Paramount Pictures
- Release date: June 17, 1975
- Running time: 99 minutes
- Country: United States
- Language: English
- Box office: $3,602,023

Bug is a 1975 American science fiction horror film directed by Jeannot Szwarc, produced and co-written by William Castle, based on Thomas Page's 1973 novel The Hephaestus Plague. It stars Bradford Dillman, Joanna Miles and Richard Gilliland.

The film initially depicts a new insect species, which faces extinction. Professor James Parmiter (Dillman), a widowed scientist crossbreeds the species with cockroaches, creating a sentient hybrid species of insects with psychic abilities.

Bug was the last film Castle was involved in before his death in 1977. It was released by Paramount Pictures on June 17, 1975.

== Plot ==
An earthquake releases a species of previously unknown insect which can create fires by rubbing their legs together. Eventually however, most of the bugs die because they cannot survive in the low air pressure on the Earth's surface.

After his wife Carrie dies when one of the insects crawls in her hair, Professor James Parmiter keeps one alive in a pressure chamber. He becomes obsessed with the insect and successfully breeds the new species with a modern cockroach, creating a breed of intelligent, flying super-cockroaches.

Parmiter goes into seclusion at a farm after seeing his creation and gaining the ability to communicate with the bugs.

== Cast ==
- Bradford Dillman as Professor James Parmiter
- Joanna Miles as Carrie Parmiter
- Richard Gilliland as Gerald Metbaum
- Jamie Smith-Jackson as Norma Tacker
- Alan Fudge as Professor Mark Ross
- Jesse Vint as Tom Tacker
- Patty McCormack as Sylvia Ross
- Brendan Dillon as Charlie
- Frederic Downs as Henry Tacker
- James Greene as Reverend Kern
- Jim Poyner as Kenny Tacker

== Production ==
Bug was writer and producer William Castle's last film, released some two years before his death. Typical of Castle, the film used a distinctive promotional gimmick, in this case a million-dollar life insurance policy for the film's insect star, "Hercules" the cockroach. Castle originally pitched a gimmick of theatre seats rigged with mechanisms to simulate the sensation of crawling insects on patrons' legs, similar to his gimmick for The Tingler (1959). However, Paramount Pictures was skeptical of the proposal, only implementing it in a few theatres.

Exterior filming took place on-location in Riverside, California, with the then-Mayor Ben H. Lewis (himself a former actor) making a cameo appearance as himself. The set used for the Parmiter house's interior was repurposed from the "Brady home" set from the sitcom The Brady Bunch, which had been cancelled before shooting began. The cockroach models were designed by Karoly Fogassy, a technical illustrator at the University of California, Riverside, while real cockroaches specially bred by a University entomologist were also used.

== Reception ==
On the review aggregator website Rotten Tomatoes, 33% of 12 critics' reviews are positive, with an average rating of 4.3/10. However, the sci-fi review site Moria was kinder to the movie, calling it Jeannot Szwarc's best film. It noted that the movie was better than expected, and the first part of the movie at least maintains scientific credibility. They also praised the lead actor's performance.

Variety found the film static and lacking interest. TV Guide liked the music and found the technical credits good, but overall found the movie mediocre.Entertainment Weekly gave the film a C, while Leonard Maltin in his movie guide gave the movie two stars. The New York Times found the movie "sickening" and felt it deserved a harsher rating than PG.

The film made just over $8 million worldwide.

== See also ==
- Phase IV - A 1974 film, also distributed by Paramount Pictures, which features a similar premise about hyper-intelligent insects.
