= It Must Be Love (2004 film) =

- Based on: "Rediscovered Love" by Nancy Whitmore
- Screenplay by: Beth Henley
- Directed by: Steven Schachter
- Starring: Ted Danson; Mary Steenburgen
- Music by: Jeff Beal
- Country of origin: United States
- Original language: English

Production
- Executive producers: Howard Braunstein; Wendy Hill-Tout; Michael Jaffe; Keri Selig
- Producer: Irene Litinsky
- Production location: Calgary
- Cinematography: Jan Kiesser
- Editor: Jean Beaudoin
- Running time: 87 minutes

Original release
- Network: CBS
- Release: February 15, 2004

It Must Be Love (also known as Surviving Love) is a 2004 American television film directed by Steven Schachter and starring Ted Danson and Mary Steenburgen, based on the short story "Rediscovered Love" by Nancy Whitmore. The film premiered on CBS on February 15, 2004.

== Cast ==
- Ted Danson as George Gazelle
- Mary Steenburgen as Clem Gazelle
- Polly Holliday as Mama Bell
- Bonnie Bartlett as Kate Gazelle
- Erin Karpluk as Tess Gazelle
- Adam Nicholas Frost as Joe Gazelle

== Production ==
The film was shot in Calgary.
