= The Deal (2008 film) =

- DVD promotion
- Directed by: Steven Schachter
- Written by: William H. Macy; Steven Schachter
- Based on: The Deal by Peter Lefcourt
- Produced by: Irene Litinsky; Keri Nakamoto; Michael Prupas
- Starring: William H. Macy; Meg Ryan; Jason Ritter; Elliott Gould; LL Cool J
- Cinematography: Paul Sarossy
- Edited by: Matt Friedman; Susan Maggi
- Music by: Jeff Beal
- Production company: Muse Entertainment Enterprises
- Distributed by: Peace Arch Entertainment
- Release date: January 22, 2008 (Sundance Film Festival)
- Running time: 100 minutes
- Country: United States
- Language: English

The Deal is a 2008 American satirical comedy film directed by Steven Schachter. The screenplay by Schachter and William H. Macy is based on the 1991 novel of the same title by Peter Lefcourt. Macy and Meg Ryan co-star.

The film was shot in Cape Town and other South African locations. It premiered at the 2008 Sundance Film Festival and was the opening night attraction at the Sarasota Film Festival. It also was shown at the Philadelphia Film Festival, the Maui Film Festival, and the Traverse City Film Festival, among others, but never was given a theatrical release in the United States. It was released on Region 1 DVD on January 20, 2009.

== Plot ==
Struggling Hollywood film producer Charlie Berns is actively trying to commit suicide when his aspiring screenwriter nephew Lionel arrives from New Jersey interrupts him. He gives him a script about 19th-century British statesman Benjamin Disraeli.

After he sees an article about powerful action-star African American Bobby Mason, a recent convert to Judaism, is seeking a role, Charlie agrees to make the film. However, only after he converts the literate PBS-style script (that he did not read) into an action adventure Middle Eastern espionage film, Ben Disraeli: Freedom Fighter.

Charlie cuts ties with the agency he has been with to go freelance. Then he creates hype by planting false rumors that get widely published, which successfully attracts Paragon Studios. After some creative wrangling with studio big-wigs and feisty project developer Deidre Hearn, whom he is instantly attracted to, he gets them to commit to making the film without seeing the script.

As Bobby is cast in the title role, when Diedre sees the rewritten script is full of dialogue, she rejects it. After promising to have a rewrite, Charlie boldly asks her about her sex life and relationship status, as he is interested and available. Diedre shoots him down, as she is engaged and is regularly satisfied.

At Charlie and Diedre's meeting with Bobby's manager Mark, at which two potential writers come, the latest script is rejected. Although the film is green-lighted, Charlie says these writers are also fired, happily declaring they should celebrate. Now Mark will have a script shortly and they start shooting in April.

Charlie proceeds to set up production in South Africa. Six weeks later, when the studio sends a man instead of Diedre to assist on production he lies, saying Bobby insists on her. She has purposely been avoiding Charlie. However, Deidre arrives, and she and Charlie shortly start to "hook-up", but are interrupted by Bobby for a frivolity. The next day, after he has a tirade over the script and the shooting, Charlie puts him in his place.

Bobby is kidnapped by terrorists a few days into the shoot, so the film is shut down by CTC, the Canadian company that bought out Paragon. The crew have a farewell party at the hotel, where Diedre's fiancé Glen introduces himself. Diedre has been fired, so she says goodbye to Charlie.

In the morning, as Charlie is again preparing to kill himself, this time with opera and pills, Deidre turns up. She hatches a scheme to produce Lionel's original script "on the Q.T.". Using financing that must stay in Prague, Charlie and Deidre manage to film Lionel's original movie there, keeping further casting and production in Europe so they do not get shut down. An e-mail causes a higher-up to end filming, but a prostitute is used to delay his arrival.

Finishing shooting in the nick of time, Charlie proposes they continue to work together, but Diedre does not think he's brave enough in his personal life. He throws himself on the hood of her departing car to prove her wrong.

The film Ben and Bill goes on to receive seven Golden Globe nominations, making Charlie and Deidre the newest power couple producers in Hollywood.

== Cast ==
- William H. Macy as Charlie Berns
- Meg Ryan as Deidre Hearn
- LL Cool J as Bobby Mason
- Elliott Gould as Rabbi Seth Gutterman
- Jason Ritter as Lionel Travitz
- Fiona Glascott as Fiona Hicks
- John Carson as Nigel Bland
- David Hunt as Grier Clark

== Critical reception ==
In his review in Variety, Peter Debruge said, "The characters seem to be doing all the laughing, while the general public has nothing to cling to but the horndog flirtation between mismatched leads William H. Macy and Meg Ryan - hardly ideal ingredients for mainstream success . . . Elliott Gould gets laughs as the credit-hungry rabbi pulled in to consult on the film, although a few A-list celebrity cameos in the movie-star roles would have gone a long way toward completing the illusion."

Although Matt Prigge of the Philadelphia Weekly felt there was "nothing remotely original" about the film, he thought it "just happens to be sprightlier than most, zipping along from one familiar but well-deployed yuk to the next and anchored by the surprisingly winning team of Macy and Meg Ryan."

Michael Atkinson of the Boston Phoenix called the film a "bouncy, sharp-edged farce . . . [whose] target audience is, to some degree, its own cast and crew. Yet it’s difficult to resist when the purely idiotic is openly mocked by a sure-footed cast of line readers led by William H. Macy . . . Meg Ryan gets a somewhat thankless role . . . but the dialogue is fast, and of course the target is a fat, awful, patronizing goldfish in a small bowl begging to be shot."
