= William H. Macy =

American actor and filmmaker (born 1950)

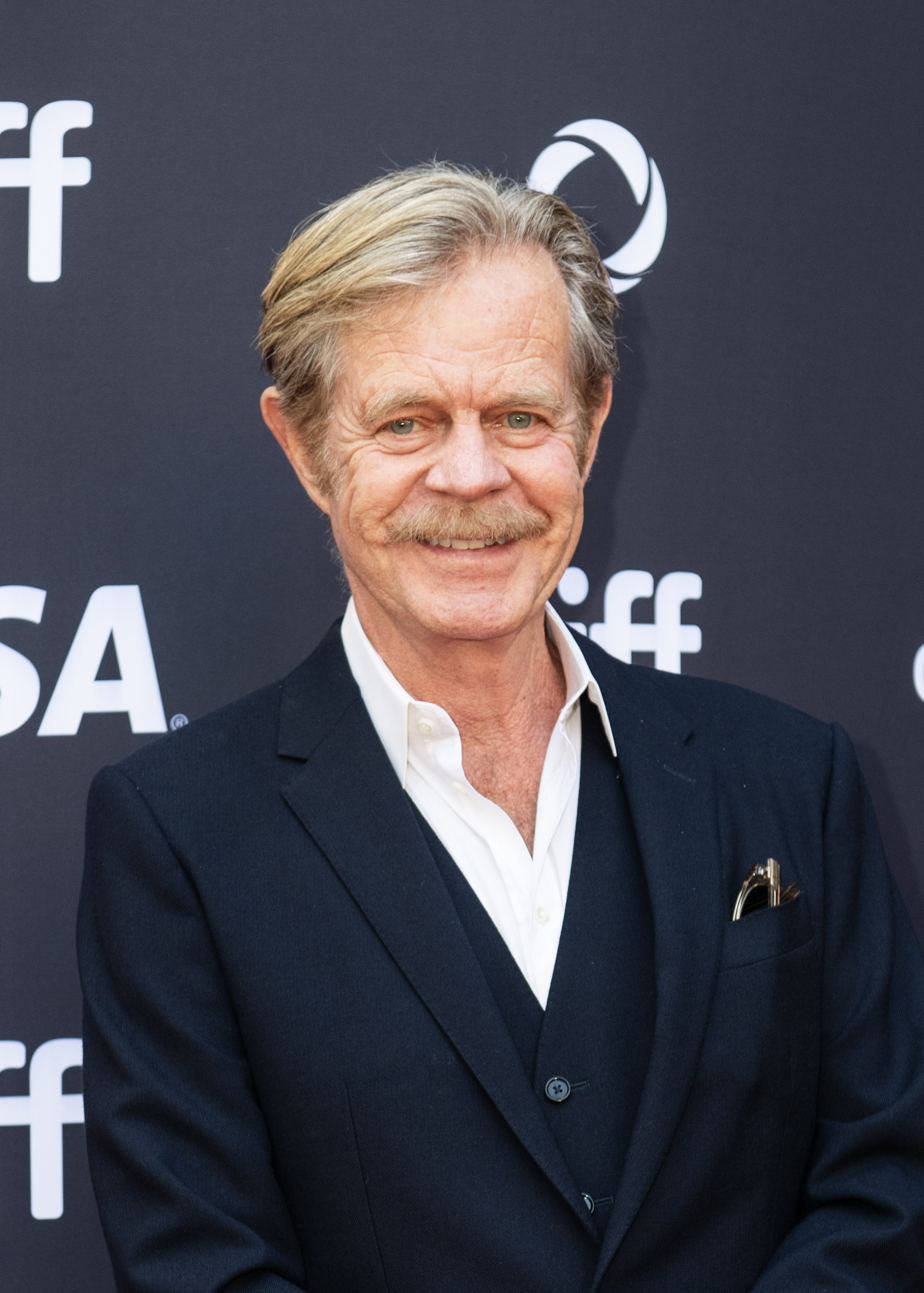
- Macy in 2025
- Born: William Hall Macy Jr. March 13, 1950 (age 76); Miami, Florida, U.S.
- Other name: W. H. Macy
- Education: Bethany College; Goddard College (BA)
- Occupations: Actor, filmmaker
- Years active: 1963–present
- Spouse: Felicity Huffman (m. 1997)
- Children: 2
- Awards: Full list

William Hall Macy Jr. (born March 13, 1950) is an American actor and filmmaker. He is a two-time Emmy Award and four-time Screen Actors Guild Award winner, and has been nominated for an Academy Award, a Drama Critics' Circle Award, and five Golden Globe Awards.

Macy rose to prominence for his collaborations with playwright David Mamet, before building a film career on appearances in small, independent films, earning two Independent Spirit Award nominations. His breakthrough film role was Jerry Lundegaard in Fargo (1996), which brought him critical acclaim and a nomination for the Academy Award for Best Supporting Actor.

Macy's subsequent mainstream film roles include Boogie Nights (1997), Air Force One (1997), Magnolia (1999), Mystery Men (1999), Jurassic Park III (2001), Bobby (2006), Thank You for Smoking (2005), Room (2015), Kingdom of the Planet of the Apes (2024), and The Running Man (2025). He starred as Dr. David Morgenstern on the television series ER (1994–98, 2009). From 2011 to 2021, he starred as Frank Gallagher on Shameless.

== Early life and education ==
Macy was born on March 13, 1950, in Miami, Florida, and grew up in Georgia and Maryland. His father, William Hall Macy Sr. (1922–2007), was awarded the Distinguished Flying Cross and an Air Medal for flying a B-17 Flying Fortress bomber in World War II; he later ran a construction company in Atlanta, Georgia, and worked for Dun & Bradstreet before taking over a Cumberland, Maryland–based insurance agency when Macy was nine years old. Macy's mother, Lois (née Overstreet; 1920–2001), was a war widow who met Macy's father after her first husband died in 1943. Macy has described her as a "Southern belle".

Macy graduated from Allegany High School in Cumberland, Maryland, in 1968. He attended Bethany College in West Virginia, where he studied veterinary medicine. A "wretched student" by his own admission, he transferred to Goddard College in rural Vermont, where he studied under playwright David Mamet, and graduated in 1972. He studied theater at HB Studio in New York City. Macy credits Gene Hackman as an inspiration.

== Career ==
=== 1968–1995: Rise to prominence ===
In the fall of 1968, Macy appeared in an Off-Broadway production of Holocaust drama The Cannibals by George Tabori at the American Place Theatre in New York City. After graduating from Goddard, Macy moved to Chicago. He originated roles in a number of plays by collaborator David Mamet, such as American Buffalo and The Water Engine. In 1972, Macy, Mamet, Patricia Cox and fellow Goddard graduate Steven Schachter founded the St. Nicholas Theater Company. In between, he worked as a bartender in Lincoln Park, Chicago and as a carpenter. In 1975, Macy appeared in a local commercial for the Chicagoland Job Mart. He was required to join AFTRA in order to do the commercial, and received his SAG card within a year, which for an elated Macy represented an important moment in his career.

Macy spent time in Los Angeles before moving to New York City in 1980, where he had roles in over fifty Off Broadway and Broadway plays. One of his earliest on-screen roles was as a theater critic congratulating Christopher Reeve in 1980's Somewhere In Time, under the name W.H. Macy, so as not to be confused with the actor Bill Macy. Another memorable early performance was as a turtle named Socrates in the direct-to-video film The Boy Who Loved Trolls (1984).

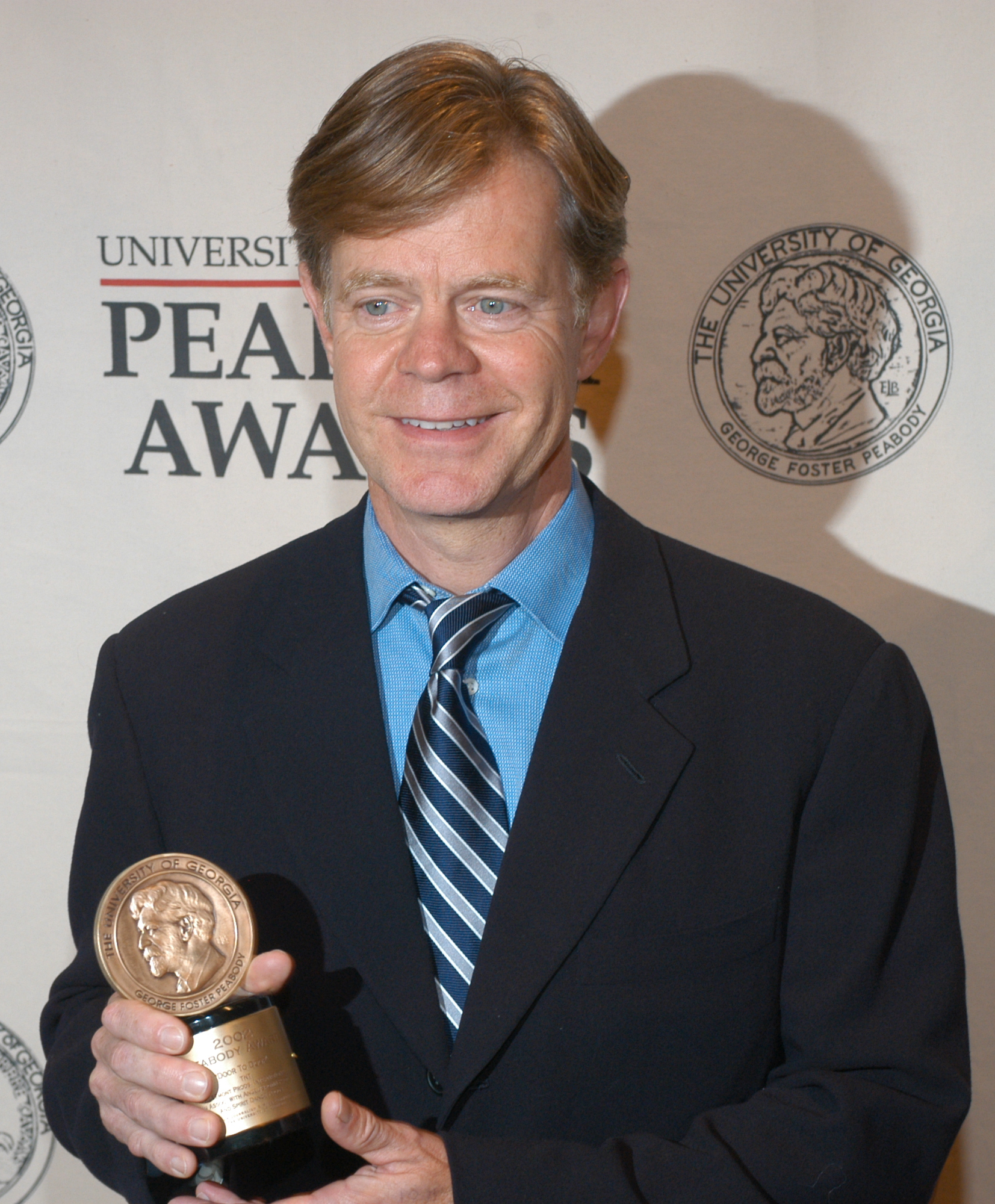
Macy at the 62nd Annual Peabody Awards, May 2003

He had a minor role as a hospital orderly on the sitcom Kate & Allie in the fourth-season episode "General Hospital", and played an assistant district attorney in "Everybody's Favorite Bagman", the first produced episode of Law & Order. In both appearances, he was billed as W. H. Macy. He has appeared in numerous films that Mamet wrote or directed, such as House of Games (1987), Things Change (1988), Homicide (1991), Oleanna (1994) (reprising the role he originated in the play of the same name), Wag the Dog (1997), State and Main (2000) and Spartan (2004).

=== 1996–2010: Fargo and expansion ===
Macy's leading role in Fargo (1996) helped boost his career and recognizability, though at the expense of nearly confining him to a narrow typecast of a worried man down on his luck. Other Macy roles of the 1990s and 2000s included Benny & Joon (1993), The Client (1994), Above Suspicion (1995), Mr. Holland's Opus (1995), Ghosts of Mississippi (1996), Air Force One (1997), Boogie Nights (1997), A Civil Action (1998), Pleasantville (1998), Gus Van Sant's remake of Psycho (1998), Happy, Texas (1999), Mystery Men (1999), Magnolia (1999), Panic (2000), Jurassic Park III (2001), Focus (2001), Welcome to Collinwood (2002), Seabiscuit (2003), The Cooler (2003), Cellular (2004), Sahara (2005), Everyone's Hero (2006) and Bobby (2006).

He had a recurring role on ER (1994–2009) and Sports Night (1999–2000). Both roles earned him an Emmy nomination for Outstanding Guest Actor in a Drama Series. Macy wrote and starred in Door to Door in 2002, winning an Emmy for writing and acting.

In a November 2003 interview with USA Today, Macy stated that he wanted to star in a big-budget action film "for the money, for the security of a franchise like that. And I love big action-adventure movies. They're way cool." He serves as director-in-residence at the Atlantic Theater Company in New York, where he teaches a technique called Practical Aesthetics. A book describing the technique, A Practical Handbook for the Actor (ISBN 0-394-74412-8), is dedicated to Macy and Mamet.

In 2007, Macy starred in Wild Hogs, a film about middle-aged men reliving their youthful days by taking to the open road on their Harley-Davidson motorcycles from Cincinnati to the Pacific Coast. Despite being critically panned, with a 14% "rotten" rating from Rotten Tomatoes, it was a financial success, grossing over $168 million. The film also reunited him with his A Civil Action costar, John Travolta. In 2009, Macy completed filming on The Maiden Heist, a comedy that co-starred Morgan Freeman and Christopher Walken.

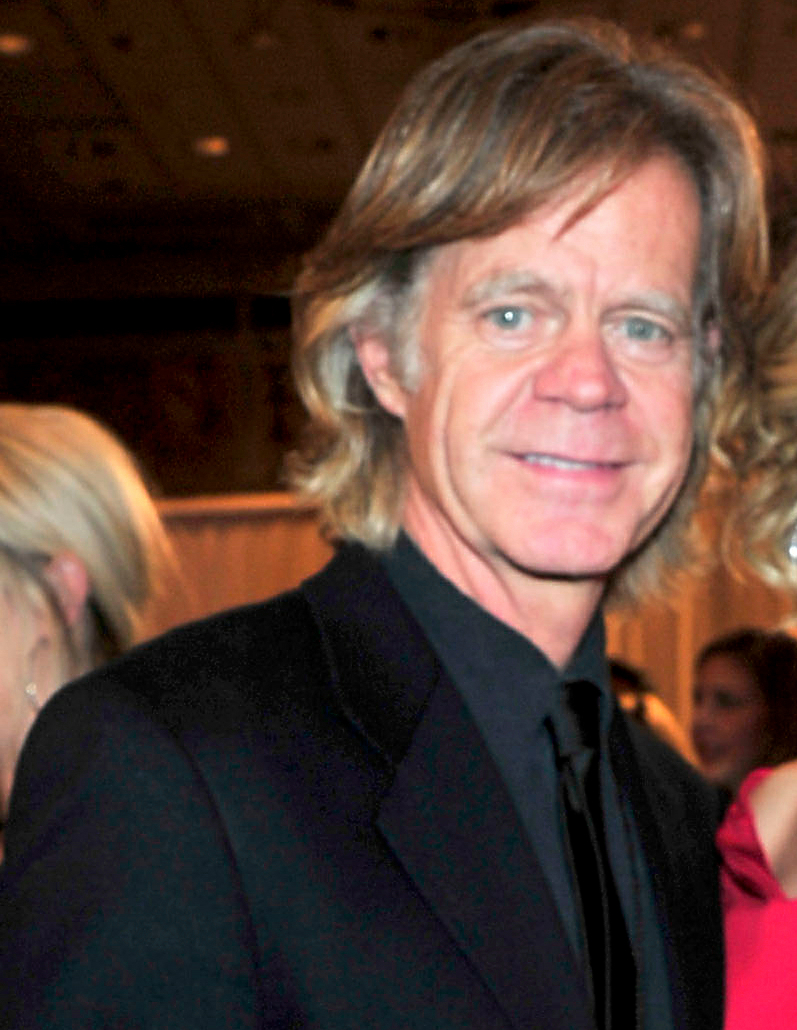
Macy in 2010

In June 2008, the Hollywood Chamber of Commerce announced Macy and his wife, Felicity Huffman, would each receive a star on the Hollywood Walk of Fame in the upcoming year. On January 13, 2009, Macy replaced Jeremy Piven in David Mamet's Speed-the-Plow on Broadway. Piven suddenly and unexpectedly dropped out of the play in December 2008 after he experienced health problems. Norbert Leo Butz covered the role from December 23, 2008, until Macy took over the part. Dirty Girl, which starred Macy along with Juno Temple, Milla Jovovich, Mary Steenburgen and Tim McGraw, premiered September 12, 2010, at the Toronto International Film Festival.

=== 2011–present: Shameless and other roles ===
In summer 2010, Macy joined the Showtime pilot Shameless as the protagonist, Frank Gallagher. The project ultimately went to series, and its first season premiered on January 9, 2011. Macy has received high critical acclaim for his performance, eventually getting an Emmy nomination for Outstanding Lead Actor in a Comedy Series in 2014.

In the 2012 film The Sessions, Macy played a priest who befriends a man with a severe disability who seeks to find personal fulfillment through a sex surrogate. He made his directorial debut with the independent drama Rudderless, which stars Billy Crudup, Anton Yelchin, Felicity Huffman, Selena Gomez and Laurence Fishburne. In 2017, he directed The Layover, a road trip comedy starring Alexandra Daddario and Kate Upton.

In 2015, he had a small role as Grandpa in the drama film Room, which was nominated for the Academy Award for Best Picture. The film reunited him with his Pleasantville costar, Joan Allen. In 2024, he played Trevathan in the film Kingdom of the Planet of the Apes.

== Personal life ==
=== Marriage and family ===
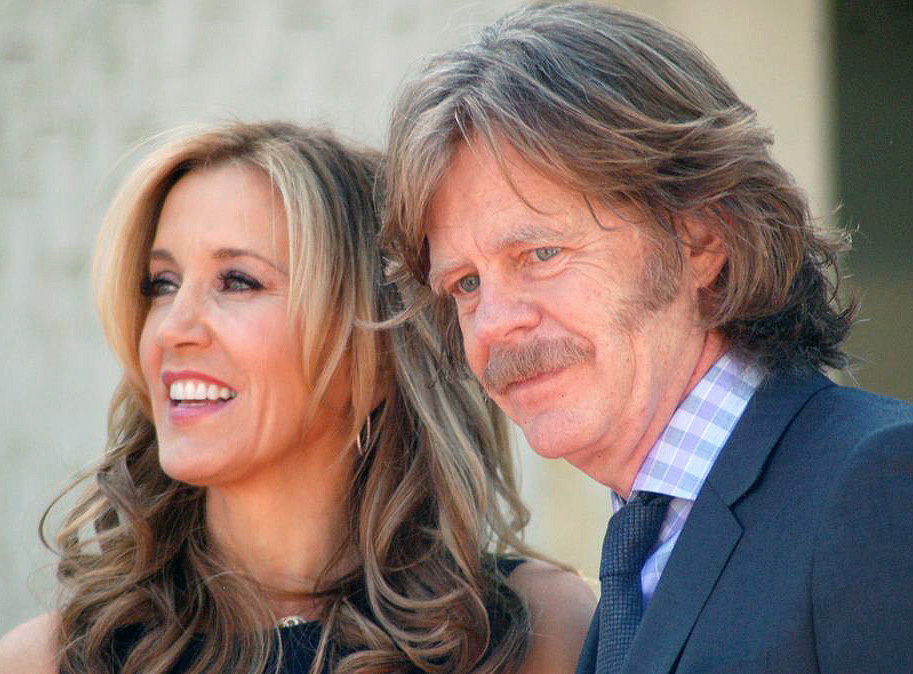
Huffman and Macy at a ceremony where each received a star on the Hollywood Walk of Fame on March 7, 2012

Macy and actress Felicity Huffman dated on-and-off for 15 years and married on September 6, 1997. They have two daughters.

=== Beliefs and interests ===
Macy and Huffman appeared at a rally for John Kerry in 2004. Macy is a Lutheran.

Macy plays the ukulele and is an avid woodturner. He has appeared on the cover of Fine Woodworking's special edition, Wood Turning Basics and was featured in an article in the April 2015 issue of American Woodturner (American Association of Woodturners). He is a national ambassador for the United Cerebral Palsy Association. Since shooting the film Wild Hogs, Macy has had a strong interest in riding motorcycles. Macy lives near and is the spokesperson for Woody Creek Distillers in Basalt, Colorado, which sells a signature whiskey bearing Macy's name.

=== Varsity Blues scandal ===
In March 2019, it was reported that Macy and Huffman had agreed to pay someone $15,000 to take a college entrance exam for their daughter Sophia. Huffman was indicted on fraud and conspiracy charges as part of a wider federal investigation of college admissions bribery. For undisclosed reasons, no charges were filed against Macy. Attorneys uninvolved in the case speculated that Macy may not have been charged because he cooperated with agents or because the government lacked sufficient evidence of his involvement.

On September 13, 2019, a federal judge in Boston sentenced Huffman to fourteen days in federal prison (of which she served 10 days), 250 hours of community service, and a year of supervised release.

== Filmography ==
=== Film ===
Key
†	Denotes films that have not yet been released

Year	Title	Role	Notes
1980	Somewhere in Time	Critic	Credited as 'W.H. Macy'
1980	Foolin' Around	Bronski	Credited as 'W.H. Macy'
1983	Without a Trace	Reporter	Credited as 'W.H. Macy'
1983	WarGames	NORAD Officer	Uncredited
1985	The Last Dragon	J.J.	Credited as 'W.H. Macy'
1987	Radio Days	Radio Actor	Credited as 'W.H. Macy'
1987	House of Games	Sgt. Moran	Credited as 'W.H. Macy'
1988	Things Change	Billy Drake	Credited as 'W.H. Macy'
1991	Homicide	Tim Sullivan	
1991	Shadows and Fog	Cop with Spiro	Credited as 'W.H. Macy'
1993	Twenty Bucks	Property Clerk	
1993	Benny & Joon	Randy Burch	
1993	Searching for Bobby Fischer	Petey's Father	
1994	Being Human	Boris	
1994	The Client	Dr. Greenway	
1994	Dead on Sight	Steven Meeker	
1994	Oleanna	John	
1995	Murder in the First	D.A. William McNeil	
1995	Evolver	Evolver (voice)	Uncredited
1995	Roommates	Doctor	Uncredited cameo
1995	Tall Tale	Railroad Magnate	Uncredited cameo
1995	Above Suspicion	Pros. Atty. Schultz	Also writer
1995	Mr. Holland's Opus	Vice-Principal Gene Wolters	
1996	Down Periscope	Commander Carl Knox	
1996	Fargo	Jerry Lundegaard	
1996	Hit Me	Policeman	
1996	Ghosts of Mississippi	Charlie Crisco	
1997	Colin Fitz Lives!	Mr. O'Day, Colin Fitz	
1997	Air Force One	Major Caldwell	
1997	Boogie Nights	Little Bill Thompson	
1997	Wag the Dog	CIA Agent Charles Young	
1998	Jerry and Tom	Karl	
1998	Pleasantville	George Parker	
1998	Psycho	Milton Arbogast	
1998	The Secret of NIMH 2: Timmy to the Rescue	Justin (voice)	
1998	A Civil Action	James Gordon	
1999	Happy, Texas	Sheriff Chappy Dent	
1999	Mystery Men	The Shoveler	
1999	Magnolia	Quiz Kid Donnie Smith	
2000	Panic	Alex	
2000	State and Main	Walt Price	
2001	Jurassic Park III	Paul Kirby	
2001	Focus	Lawrence "Larry" Newman	
2002	Welcome to Collinwood	Riley	
2003	The Cooler	Bernie Lootz	
2003	Stealing Sinatra	John Irwin	
2003	Easy Riders, Raging Bulls	Narrator (voice)	Documentary
2003	Seabiscuit	Tick Tock McGlaughlin	
2004	Spartan	Stoddard	
2004	In Enemy Hands	Chief of Boat Nathan Travers	
2004	Cellular	Sgt. Bob Mooney	
2005	Sahara	Admiral James Sandecker	
2005	Edmond	Edmond Burke	
2005	Thank You for Smoking	Senator Ortolan K. Finistirre	
2006	Doogal	Brian the Snail (voice)	
2006	The Abominable Snowman	Rudyard North (voice)	Also executive producer
2006	Bobby	Paul	
2006	Inland Empire	Announcer	
2006	Everyone's Hero	Lefty Maginnis (voice)	
2007	Wild Hogs	Dudley Frank	
2007	He Was a Quiet Man	Gene Shelby	
2008	The Deal	Charlie Berns	Also writer
2008	Bart Got a Room	Ernie Stein	
2008	The Tale of Despereaux	Lester (voice)	
2009	The Maiden Heist	George McLendon	
2009	Shorts	Dr. Noseworthy	
2010	Marmaduke	Don Twombly	
2010	Dirty Girl	Ray	
2011	The Lincoln Lawyer	Frank Levin	
2011	Portraits in Dramatic Time	Himself	
2012	The Sessions	Father Brendan	
2013	A Single Shot	Pitt	
2013	Trust Me	Gary	
2014	The Wind Rises	Satomi (voice)	
2014	Ernest & Celestine	Head Dentist (voice)	English dub
2014	Rudderless	Trill	Also writer, director, and executive producer
2014	Two-Bit Waltz	Carl	
2014	Cake	Leonard	
2015	Walter	Dr. Corman	
2015	Dial a Prayer	Bill	
2015	Stealing Cars	Philip Wyatt	
2015	Room	Robert "Grandpa" Newsome	
2016	Blood Father	Kirby	
2017	The Layover	—N/a	Director
2017	Krystal	Wyatt	Also director
2023	Maybe I Do	Sam	
2024	Ricky Stanicky	Ted Summerhayes	
2024	Kingdom of the Planet of the Apes	Trevathan	
2025	Train Dreams	Arn Peeples	
2025	Soul on Fire	Jack Buck	
2025	The Running Man	Molie Jernigan	
2025	Frontier Crucible	Major O'Rourke	
2026	Brian	TBA	
2026	Speed Demon	Father Novak	
2026	The Deputy	Sheriff Krueger	

=== Television ===
Key
†	Denotes television productions that have not yet been released

Year	Title	Role	Notes
1982	Another World	Frank Fisk	Credited as 'W.H. Macy'
1985	Hometown	Loring Dixwell	Episode: "Mary's Yen"; credited as 'W.H. Macy'
1985–88	Spenser: For Hire	Efrem Connors	3 episodes; credited as 'W.H. Macy'
1986	Kate & Allie	Carl	Episode: "General Hospital"; credited as 'W.H. Macy'
1987	The Equalizer	Dr. Spaulding	Episode: "Hand and Glove"; credited as 'W.H. Macy'
1987	Alive from Off Center	Uncredited	Episode: "As Seen on TV"
1989	Tattingers	Myron	Episode: "Tour of Doody"; credited as 'W.H. Macy'
1990	ABC Afterschool Specials	Store Clerk	Episode: "All That Glitters"
1990–92	Law & Order	John McCormack, Powell	2 episodes
1992	Civil Wars	Donald Patchen	Episode: "Denise and De Nuptials"
1993	Bakersfield P.D.	Russell Karp	Episode: "Cable Does Not Pay"
1993	L.A. Law	Bernard Ruskin	Episode: "Rhyme and Punishment"
1994–98, 2009	ER	Dr. David Morgenstern	Main role; seasons 1–4 & 15
1995	Mystery Dance	Bob Wilson	Episode: "Episode #1.1"
1998	Superman: The Animated Series	The Director (voice)	Episode: "Where There's Smoke"
1998	The Lionhearts	Leo Lionheart (voice)	Recurring role
1998	King of the Hill	Dr. Rubin (voice)	Episode: "Pregnant Paws"
1998	Hercules	Jorgen Svenson, Sven Jorgenson (voices)	Episode: "Hercules and the Twilight of the Gods"
1999	Frasier	Ralph	Episode: "Good Samaritan"
1999	The Wild Thornberrys	Skoot (voice)	Episode: "On the Right Track"
1999–2000	Batman Beyond	Aaron Herbst, Karros (voices)	2 episodes
1999–2000	Sports Night	Sam Donovan	6 episodes
2001	Nature	Narrator	Episode: "Polar Bear Invasion"
2006	The Simpsons	Himself (voice)	Episode: "Homer's Paternity Coot"
2006–07	Curious George	Narrator (voice)	Main role
2007	The Unit	President of the United States	Episode: "The Broom Cupboard"
2011–21	Shameless	Frank Gallagher	Main role; directed 3 episodes / wrote 1 episode showrunner from seasons 5–8 & 11
2011	Versailles	Bill	3 episodes
2022	The Dropout	Richard Fuisz	5 episodes
2023	The Conners	Smitty Cusamano	Episode: "Two More Years and a Stolen Rose"
2024	The Real Housewives of Beverly Hills	Himself	Episode: "Bitter Pill to Swallow"
2024	Accused	Raymond	Episode: "Lorraine's Story"
TBA	The Land †	Hank Durkin	Main role

==== TV films and miniseries ====
Year	Title	Role	Notes
1978	The Awakening Land	Will Beagle	Credited as 'W.H. Macy'
1983	The Cradle Will Fall	Ben Duffy	Credited as 'W.H. Macy'
1983	Sitcom	Chip Gooseberry	Credited as 'W.H. Macy'
1984	The Boy Who Loved Trolls	Socrates the Turtle (voice)	Credited as 'W.H. Macy'
1984	The Dining Room	Various roles (Note: Arthur, Charlie, Architect, Billy, Nick, Fred, Tony, Standish)	Credited as 'W.H. Macy'
1985	Joanna	Napoleon Flipper	Credited as 'W.H. Macy'
1988	The Murder of Mary Phagan	Randy	Credited as 'W.H. Macy'
1988	Lip Service	Farmer	Also director; credited as 'W.H. Macy'
1992	In the Line of Duty: Siege at Marion	Ray Daniels	
1992	A Private Matter	Psychiatrist	
1992	The Water Engine	Charles Lang	
1992	A Murderous Affair: The Carolyn Warmus Story	Sean Hammel	
1992	The Heart of Justice	Booth	
1994	Texan	Doctor	
1995	In the Shadow of Evil	Dr. Frank Teague	
1996	Andersonville	Col. Chandler	
1996	The Writing on the Wall	Petrocelli	
1998	The Con	Bobby Sommerdinger	Also writer
1999	A Slight Case of Murder	Terry Thorpe	Also writer
1999	The Night of the Headless Horseman	Ichabod Crane	
2002	Door to Door	Bill Porter	Also writer
2002	It's a Very Merry Muppet Christmas Movie	Glenn	
2003	Out of Order	Steven	
2004	Reversible Errors	Arthur Raven	
2004	The Wool Cap	Charlie Gigot	Also writer and producer
2006	Nightmares and Dreamscapes	Clyde Umney, Sam Landry, George Demmick	
2008	Family Man	Todd Becker	Also writer and executive producer

== Stage credits ==
Year	Title	Role	Venue	Notes	Ref.
1963	Room Service		Master Theatre, New York City	Off-Broadway debut	
1968	The Cannibals	Uncle / Mad Mr. Reich	The American Place Theatre		
1974	Squirrels	Edmond	St. Nicholas Theater, Chicago		
1975	American Buffalo	Bobby	Goodman Theatre, Chicago		
1975–76	American Buffalo	Bobby	St. Nicholas Theater, Chicago		
1977	The Water Engine	Charles Lang	St. Nicholas Theater, Chicago		
1980	The Man in 605	Jerry Green	Lucille Lortel Theatre, New York City		
1980	Twelfth Night	Sebastian	Circle Theatre, New York City		
1981	The Beaver Coat	Dr. Fleischer	Circle Theatre, New York City		
1981	The Front Page	Hildy Johnson	Goodman Theatre		
1981–82	The Dining Room	3rd Actor	Playwrights Horizon, New York City		
1981–82	The Dining Room	3rd Actor	Astor Place Theatre, New York City		
1983	Baby with the Bathwater	John	Playwrights Horizon, New York City		
1985–86	Prairie du Chien	Gin Player	Lincoln Center Theater, New York City		
1986	The Nice and the Nasty	Junius Upsey	Playwrights Horizon, New York City		
1986–87	Bodies, Rest and Motion	Nick	Lincoln Center Theater, New York City		
1988	Boys' Life	—N/a	Lincoln Center Theater, New York City	Director	
1988–89	Our Town	Howie Newsome	Lyceum Theatre, New York City	Broadway debut	
1989	Bobby Gould in Hell	The Interrogator	Lincoln Center Theater, New York City		
1990	Squirrels	—N/a	Annenberg Center for Performing Arts, Philadelphia	Director	
1990	Three Sisters	—N/a	Atlantic Theater, New York City	Director	
1991	Three Sisters	—N/a	Annenberg Center for Performing Arts, Philadelphia	Director	
1991	Three Sisters	—N/a	Linda Gross Theater, New York City	Director	
1991	Life During Wartime	Heinrich	New York City Center, New York City		
1991	Mr. Gogol and Mr. Preen	Mr. Preen	Lincoln Center Theater, New York City		
1992–94	Oleanna	John	Orpheum Theatre, New York City		
1997	The Joy of Going Somewhere Definite	—N/a	Atlantic Theater, New York City	Director	
2000	American Buffalo	Teach	Atlantic Theater, New York City		
2008–09	Speed-the-Plow	Bobby Gould	Ethel Barrymore Theatre, New York City		
2020	The Christopher Boy's Communion	Hollis	Odyssey Theatre, Los Angeles		
