= Jeanne Patterson Miles =

American painter and sculptor

Jeanne Patterson Miles (1908–1990) was an American abstract painter and sculptor.

== Early life and education ==
Miles was a native of Baltimore who grew up in Washington, D.C. She earned her Bachelor of Fine Arts degree from George Washington University, where she was the first woman to enroll in the art school. While painting a mural at a D.C. society cafe, Miles met a wealthy benefactor who agreed to fund a travel scholarship to Tahiti. Miles traveled there in 1937. When the grant money ran low, she left as a stowaway on a cargo ship to France.

== Career ==
In Paris, Miles studied at the Académie de la Grande Chaumière and with Marcel Gromaire, developing her work in the Fauvist style. She exhibited work in the Salon des Indépendants in 1938. Miles fled the Nazi occupation of France and returned to the United States, where she lived in Greenwich Village, exhibiting with the Betty Parsons Gallery.

Miles was a member of the Abstract Expressionist movement in New York during the 1940s, and one of the few women involved in founding the Artists' Club. Her artistic and social circle included Mark Rothko, Clyfford Still and Bradley Walker Tomlin. She co-taught art classes in her home with the New York School painter Theodore Stamos, and lectured at Oberlin College.

Miles began to move away from the Abstract Expressionist style in the 1950s, seeking instead to evoke mysticism and spirituality through pure geometric forms, particularly mandalas. She combined these simple forms with a distinctive use of gold and platinum leaf that gave the modernist abstractions a medieval or Byzantine sensibility. Her style was informed by Tantric art, Islamic and Tibetan art, eastern philosophy, and the philosopher P. Ouspensky. In the 1960s she experimented with cast polyester sculpture in spherical forms, but had to stop that work because of the medium's toxicity.

Miles was an instructor at Oberlin College, Moravian College, Yale University and the New York Institute of Technology, and worked as a docent at the Solomon R. Guggenheim Museum. During her half-century career she had one-woman shows at the Betty Parsons Gallery, the Anita Shapolsky Gallery and the Marilyn Pearl Gallery. Her work is in the collections of the Guggenheim, the Cincinnati Art Museum, the Los Angeles County Museum of Art, the Corcoran collection, and the Newark Museum, among others.

Miles died in Los Angeles in 1999. A collection of her papers is held at the Archives of American Art of the Smithsonian Institution.

== Personal life ==
Miles was briefly married to Johannes Schiefer, a French painter. Her daughter is the actress Joanna Miles.

== Awards and honors ==
Miles received grants from Yaddo and the MacDowell Colony. In 1968 she received an award from the American Academy and Institute of Arts and Letters, and in 1970 and 1973 she received Mark Rothko awards. She was honored with George Washington University's Alumni Achievement Award in 1987.
