= The Con (film) =

- Genre: Comedy; Crime; Drama
- Written by: William H. Macy; Steven Schachter
- Directed by: Steven Schachter
- Starring: William H. Macy; Rebecca De Mornay; Mike Nussbaum
- Theme music composer: Peter Manning Robinson
- Country of origin: United States
- Original language: English

Production
- Producer: Bob Roe
- Cinematography: Peter Stein
- Editor: Cari Coughlin
- Running time: 1hr. 32 min.
- Production companies: Mi Sammy Productions; Wilshire Court Productions

Original release
- Network: USA Network
- Release: March 4, 1998

The Con is a 1998 television movie starring William H. Macy and Rebecca De Mornay. De Mornay plays a con woman who develops romantic feelings for her mark (Macy) while scheming to marry him in order to get her hands on his fortune. It was directed by Steven Schachter and written by Macy and Schachter, who shared the 1999 Lone Star Film & Television Award for Best TV Teleplay. The film originally aired on the USA Network on March 4, 1998.

== Cast ==
- William H. Macy as Bobby
- Rebecca De Mornay as Barbara Beaton/Nancy Throroughgood
- Mike Nussbaum as Harry
- Angela Paton as Lyla
- Frances Sternhagen as Hadabelle
- Tony Frank as Edgar Wallace
- Don Harvey as T.J.
- Lee Stringer as Earl Wainwright
- Gina Mastrogiacomo as Debbie
- Steve Shearer as Joe Charnin
- Mary B. McCann as Donna
- Melanie Haynes as Clinic Nurse
- Grayson Jim Helms as Pilot
- Blue Deckert as Card player
- Kathy Lamkin as Woman #1
- James Hansen Prince as Mortuary Attendant
- Jimmy Ray Pickens as Rowdy #1
- Alex Morris as Scary fellow
