= Marcel Gromaire =

French painter (1892–1971)

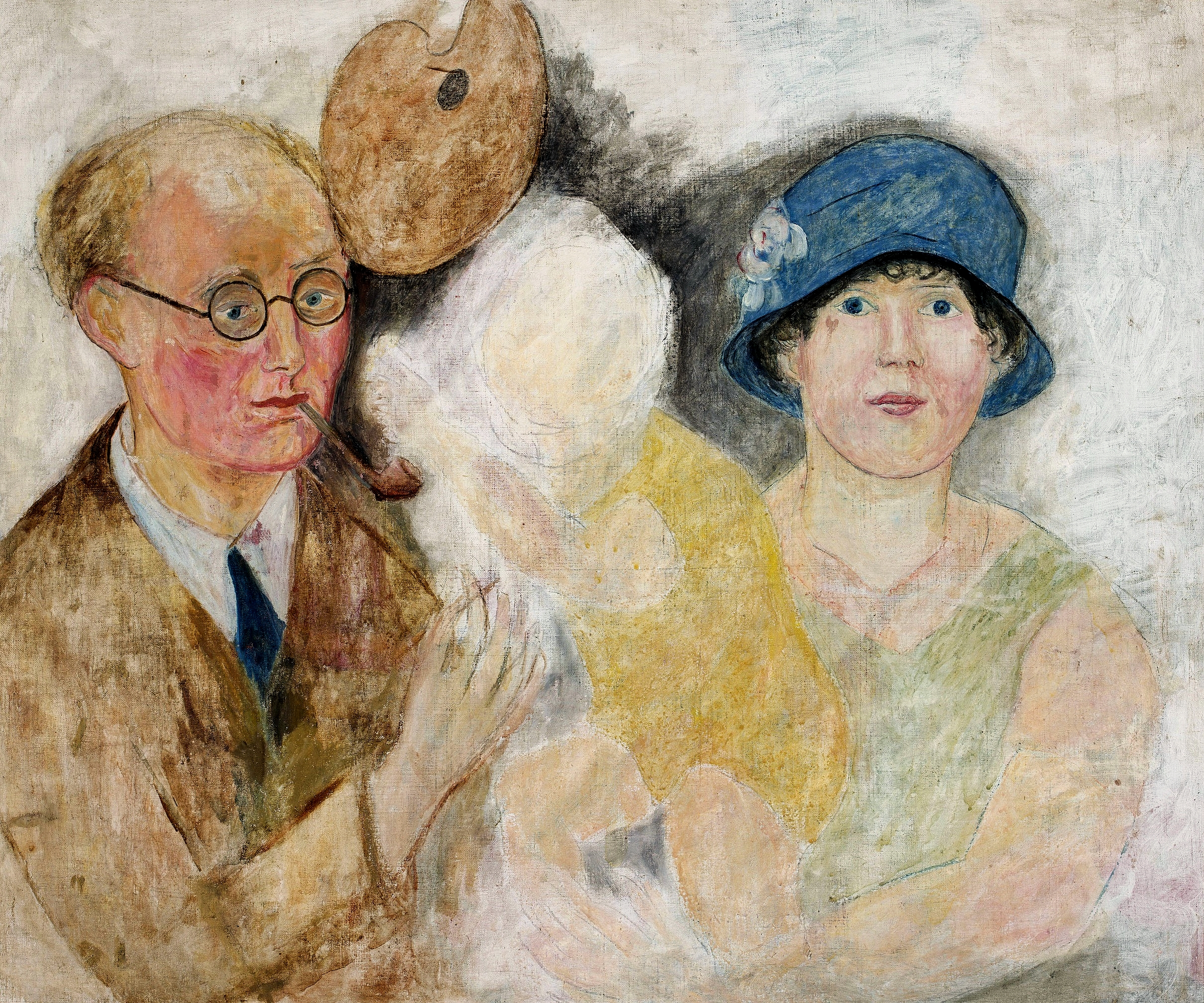
Portrait of Marcel Gromaire and his family by Tadeusz Makowski, ca. 1925, National Museum in Warsaw

Marcel Gromaire (French pronunciation: [maʁsɛl ɡʁɔmɛʁ]; 24 July 1892 – 11 April 1971) was a French painter. He painted many works on social subjects and is often associated with Social Realism, but Gromaire can be said to have created an independent oeuvre distinct from groups and movements.

== Early life ==
Marcel Gromaire, whose father was an educator in Paris, was born in Noyelles-sur-Sambre, France. He studied classically at Douai, then continued his studies in Paris, receiving his Baccalauréat in Law in 1909, a judiciary career path he quickly abandoned. He frequented studios in Montparnasse and attended classes at Académie de La Palette. In 1912, he performed his military service in Lille. He was wounded in 1916 in the Battle of the Somme.

== Creative life ==
Gromaire returned to Paris. Working in a Paris studio, he painted the reality of his studio and its light and contents, using dark ochres and browns. He used his studio as a standard, a filter; it was more than just a place to paint.

A meeting with a collector, Doctor Girardin, established his career as an artist when he purchased the entirety of the work of Gromaire. When Girardin died in 1953, the Museum of Modern Art in Paris received 78 oil paintings as well as a collection of watercolours.

Gromaire was recognized very early by galleries and museums. Already in 1931 Pierre Matisse exhibited Gromaire's work at the inauguration of his New York gallery. In 1933, a retrospective at the Kunsthalle de Baie established the importance of his body of works. In 1937, his work was exhibited by orders of the State at the Paris Exposition Internationale.

Gromaire painted a little over seven hundred canvases, an average of about ten per year.

He also taught, and his pupils included the painter and sculptor Jeanne Patterson Miles.

== Later career ==
From 1939 to 1944, Gromaire resided at Aubusson, Creuse, and participated in the renewal of the tapestry movement with Jean Lurcat. He was named a professor at the École nationale supérieure des arts décoratifs from 1950 until 1962.

In 1950, he travelled to the United States as a member of the jury for the Carnegie Prize, which was awarded to Jacques Villon that year. A Carnegie prize (not first) was awarded to Gromaire himself in 1952.

In 1954, he was made commander of the Légion d'honneur and in 1958, the Grand Prix National des Arts.

From 1947 to 1956, he exhibited at the Galerie Louis Carré in Paris. In 1963, a retrospective was dedicated to Gromaire at the Musée national d'art moderne.

Gromaire died in Paris in 1971 after a long stay in hospital. In 1980, an exhibition was held at the Musée d'art moderne de la Ville de Paris from 12 June to 28 September.
