= Above Suspicion (1995 film) =

1995 American crime-thriller drama film

- Genre: Drama; Thriller
- Written by: Jerry Lazarus; W.H. Macy; Steven Schachter
- Directed by: Steven Schachter
- Starring: Christopher Reeve; Joe Mantegna; Kim Cattrall; Edward Kerr
- Music by: Michael Hoenig
- Country of origin: United States
- Original language: English

Production
- Executive producer: Keith Samples
- Producers: William Hart; Jerry Lazarus
- Cinematography: Ross Berryman
- Editor: Martin Hunter
- Running time: 95 minutes
- Production company: Rysher Entertainment

Original release
- Network: HBO
- Release: May 21, 1995

Above Suspicion is a 1995 American made-for-television crime thriller film directed by Steven Schachter, and starring Christopher Reeve, Joe Mantegna and Kim Cattrall. The screenplay was written by William H. Macy, who also has a small role in the film. It premiered on HBO on May 21, 1995.

In the film, Reeve plays a paralyzed cop who plots to murder his wife. On May 27, 1995, 6 days after the film's release, Reeve himself was paralyzed from the shoulders down after suffering a spinal cord injury in a horse-riding accident.

== Plot ==
Dempsey Cain is a top detective in San Sebastian, California. His brother, Nick, is also a cop but is generally viewed as a screw-up despite Dempsey's attempts to help him. Nick is having an affair with Dempsey's wife, Gail. Alan Rhinehart is another detective who thinks Dempsey is dirty and resents him for being the star on the force.

In part due to Nick's carelessness, Dempsey is shot during a night raid on a tenement building and his doctor says he is paralyzed from the waist down. Dempsey still covers for Nick's mistake. He is medically retired from the force.

Dempsey and Gail send their son, Damon, away to camp for the summer. Gail tells Nick that she dislikes being the wife of a disabled man. One night, Dempsey's neighbor, Iris, looks through her kitchen window and sees him pointing a gun at his head but she bangs on the door and seemingly stops him from committing suicide. Iris tells Gail about the attempt.

Dempsey informs Gail and Nick that he does not want to spend his life in a wheelchair and asks them to help him die. The pair agree to kill Dempsey and make it look like a botched home robbery. On the night it is set to happen, they sneak out of a movie theater after causing a commotion in order to create their alibi, go to the house, and start staging the scene. They take two pistols with silencers out of a dresser drawer. Nick puts his gun to Dempsey's head but cannot bring himself to shoot his brother. Gail aims her gun at her husband, pulls the trigger, and the gun clicks. Dempsey shoots Gail dead and informs Nick that he knew about the affair before rising from his wheelchair and fatally shooting him.

The police conclude that Dempsey killed Gail and Nick in self-defense. Alan, however, becomes suspicious that Dempsey murdered them and begins to investigate, over the objections of his captain and other officers. He finds some inconsistencies in Dempsey's account and locates a man who forged a driver's license for Nick which he used to rent the car with which he drove himself and Gail to the house on the night of the murders.

Alan leaks his investigation to the press but denies doing so after a story about it appears in the newspaper. His captain reluctantly agrees to have Dempsey charged as the police cannot be seen as covering up a possible crime committed by one of their own. During a pre-trial hearing, Dempsey's lawyer undermines much of the state's case. The judge rules that there is not sufficient evidence to proceed to trial and dismisses the matter.

Alan approaches Dempsey in the courtroom and tells him that he knows that he is a murderer and knows that he can walk. Alan then stabs Dempsey in the right thigh, expecting to elicit a physical reaction to prove that he actually can use his legs. Dempsey does not even wince and acts as if he did not feel the stabbing. Alan is arrested and loses his job. Dempsey begins dating Iris and starts a new life with her and Damon, while still pretending to be a paraplegic.

== Cast ==
- Christopher Reeve as Dempsey Cain
- Joe Mantegna as Alan Rhinehart
- Kim Cattrall as Gail Cain
- Edward Kerr as Nick Cain
- Geoffrey Rivas as Enrique
- Finola Hughes as Iris
- William H. Macy as Prosecuting Attorney Schultz
- Ron Canada as Captain Lindsay
- Natalia Nogulich as Defense Attorney Wallace
- Clark Gregg as Randy
- Marty Levy as Syd
- Blake Foster as Damon Cain
- Joanna Miles as Laura

== Production and associated events ==
The film was shot in North Carolina.

Six days after the film premiered, Reeve fell from his horse during an equestrian competition in Virginia. He broke his neck and was paralyzed, necessitating the use of a wheelchair and ventilator for the rest of his life.

== Soundtrack ==
No.	Title	Writer(s)	Performer(s)	Length
1.	"Heard You Right"	Beverly D'Angelo, Jeff D'Angelo	Beverly D'Angelo, Jeff D'Angelo
2.	"You Don't Love Me Anymore"	Beverly D'Angelo, Jeff D'Angelo	Beverly D'Angelo, Jeff D'Angelo
3.	"Passion That'll Last Me"	Beverly D'Angelo, Jeff D'Angelo	Beverly D'Angelo, Jeff D'Angelo
4.	"Lonely Stranger"	Larry Dunn	The Rhythm Sheiks
5.	"Yours"	Philip Bailey, Roxanne Seeman, Chuck Wild	Scott Mayo
6.	"Guadalajara"	Pepe Guízar	Jose Ortega and his Mariachi Ensemble Stuart Codling
