= Martin Hunter (editor) =

Film editor

- Occupation: Film editor
- Years active: c. 1980–present
- Notable work: Full Metal Jacket; Kalifornia; Mortal Kombat; Event Horizon; Soldier; Underworld; The Chronicles of Riddick
- Spouse(s): Holley Chant (m. 1993; div. 2007) Linda Alexandra Hunter (m. 2007)

Martin Hunter is a film editor active in Hollywood and Sweden. His credits include Full Metal Jacket (1987), Kalifornia (1993), Mortal Kombat (1995), Event Horizon (1997), Soldier (1998), Underworld (2003), and The Chronicles of Riddick (2004).

== Career ==
Hunter first worked as a sound assistant on Stanley Kubrick's The Shining (1980), after which he made his debut as editor on Kubrick's Full Metal Jacket (1987). He subsequently worked on several major Hollywood films and later in the horror genre, including Cadence (1990), Liebestraum (1991), Kalifornia (1993), Mortal Kombat (1995), The Arrival (1996), Event Horizon (1997), Soldier (1998), Underworld (2003), The Chronicles of Riddick (2004), Not Forgotten (2009), Whiteout (also 2009), and 11-11-11 (2011). He remains active in Hollywood and Sweden.

He married actress Holley Chanet, who later appeared in Event Horizon, on October 30, 1993. They later divorced in 2007 and Hunter married Linda Alexandra Hunter that same year.

== Filmography ==
=== Sound assistant ===
- The Shining (1980)

=== Editor ===
- Full Metal Jacket (1987) - editing debut
- Cold Front (1989)
- Cadence (1990)
- Liebestraum (1991)
- The Water Engine (1992)
- Kalifornia (1993)
- Minotaur (1994)
- Above Suspicion (1995)
- Mortal Kombat (1995)
- The Arrival (1996)
- Event Horizon (1997)
- Soldier (1998)
- Other Voices (2000)
- Cutaway (TV 2000)
- Spanish Judges (2000)
- In the Shadows (2001)
- Below (2002)
- Underworld (2003)
- The Chronicles of Riddick (2004)
- The Flock (2007)
- The Perfect Sleep (2009)
- Not Forgotten (2009)
- Whiteout (2009)
- Starring Maja (2009)
- 11-11-11 (2011)
- The Greening of Whitney Brown (2011)
- Shadow People (2013)
- Dating Game Killer (2017)
- Lansky (2021)
