= Joanna Miles =

American actress

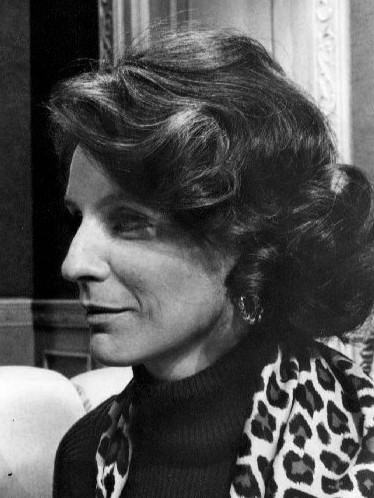
- Miles on All My Children, 1972
- Born: Nice, France
- Years active: 1963–present
- Mother: Jeanne Patterson Miles

Joanna Miles is an American actress. She received two Emmy Awards for her portrayal of Laura Wingfield in the 1973 film production of Tennessee Williams's The Glass Menagerie.

== Early life and education ==
Miles was born in Nice, France, the daughter of Jeanne Patterson Miles, an American painter, and Johannes Schiefer, a French painter and art curator. She was accepted into the Actors Studio, where she studied alongside Al Pacino, Robert De Niro, and Dustin Hoffman.

== Acting career ==
Miles won two Emmy Awards for her portrayal of Laura Wingfield in the 1973 film production of Tennessee Williams' The Glass Menagerie: the Super Emmy for Best Supporting Actress in Drama, and Supporting Actress of the Year.

She has also played supporting roles in various movies, including The Way We Live Now (1970), Bug (1975), The Ultimate Warrior (1975), The Dark Secret of Harvest Home (1978), A Fire in the Sky (1978), Cross Creek (1983), Blackout (1988), Rosencrantz & Guildenstern are Dead (1990), Above Suspicion (1995), Judge Dredd (1995) and Sex and Breakfast (2007). She is known to Star Trek: The Next Generation fans as Perrin, Sarek's wife, from the episodes "Sarek" and "Unification".

In 2001, she had a secondary role as the wife of a storekeeper in Tom Selleck's Turner Network Television Western film, Crossfire Trail. She was also in an episode of The Incredible Hulk entitled "The Quiet Room" and in the episode "Murder on the Flip Side" of the NBC crime drama The Eddie Capra Mysteries.

== Filmography ==
- The Way We Live Now (1970) as Amelia
- The Glass Menagerie (1973 - TV movie) as Laura Wingfield
- Born Innocent (1974 - TV movie) as Counselor Barbara Clark
- Aloha Means Goodbye (1974 - TV movie) as Pamela Crane
- The Trial of Chaplain Jensen (1975 - TV movie) as Kathleen Jensen
- Bug (1975) as Carrie Parmiter
- The Ultimate Warrior (1975) as Melinda
- Delta County, U.S.A. (1977 - TV movie) as Kate McCain Nicholas
- A Fire in the Sky (1978 - TV movie) as Jennifer Dreiser
- The Eddie Capra Mysteries (1978)_Episode: "Murder on the Flip Side" as Maggie Wright
- The Orphan (1979) as David's mother
- The Promise of Love (1980 - TV movie) as Toni Emilio, Kathy's mother
- The Sound of Murder (1982) as Ann Norberry
- Cross Creek (1983) as Mrs. Turner
- Dallas (1984) as Martha Randolph
- As Is (1986 - TV movie) as Lily
- Right to Die (1987 - TV movie) as Katherine
- Blackout (1988) as Eleanor Carpenter
- Rosencrantz & Guildenstern are Dead (1990) as Gertrude
- The Water Engine (1992 - TV movie) as Mrs. Varek
- The Habitation of Dragons (1992 - TV movie) as Evelyn Sparks
- The Heart of Justice (1992 - TV movie) as Mrs. Burgess
- Willing to Kill: The Texas Cheerleader Story (1992 - TV movie) as Joyce
- Cooperstown (1993 - TV movie) as Louise
- The American Clock (1993 - TV movie) as Fanny
- Above Suspicion (1995) as Laura
- Judge Dredd (1995) as Judge McGruder
- Everything to Gain (1996 - TV movie) as Jessica Jordan
- Alone (1997 - TV movie) as Jacqueline
- Spenser: Small Vices (1999 - TV movie) as Evans
- Thin Air (2000 - TV movie) as Evans
- Crossfire Trail (2001 - TV movie) as Melissa Thompson
- Monte Walsh (2003 - TV movie) as Sairy Brennan
- Jane Doe: Ties That Bind (2007 - TV movie) as Emily Myers
- Sex and Breakfast (2007) as Dr. Wellbridge
- Grave Misconduct (2008 - TV movie) as Catherine Hallow
- Jesse Stone: Thin Ice (2009 - TV movie) as Mrs. Steinberg
- Hunt for the Labyrinth Killer (2013 - TV movie) as Pat Spencer
