= The Water Engine (film) =

1992 television film by Steven Schachter

- Based on: The Water Engine by David Mamet
- Written by: David Mamet
- Directed by: Steven Schachter
- Starring: Patti LuPone; William H. Macy; John Mahoney; Joe Mantegna; Treat Williams
- Composer: Alaric Jans
- Country of origin: United States
- Original language: English

Production
- Executive producer: Michael Brandman
- Producer: Donald P. Borchers
- Cinematography: Bryan England
- Editor: Martin Hunter
- Running time: 110 minutes
- Production companies: Amblin Television; Brandman Productions; Planet Productions

Original release
- Network: TNT
- Release: August 24, 1992

The Water Engine is an American historical drama television film directed by Steven Schachter and written by David Mamet, based on his 1977 play of the same name. The film stars Patti LuPone, William H. Macy, John Mahoney, Joe Mantegna, and Treat Williams. It was released on TNT on August 24, 1992.

== Plot ==
Charles Lang works at a menial job at a factory and lives with his blind sister Rita in an apartment in Chicago during the 1934 World's Fair. But he is also an amateur inventor, and the play centers around a machine he designs that can create electricity from distilled water. Seeking to patent his idea, he finds a lawyer, Mason Gross, in the phone book and shows him the machine, but Gross’s motivations seem to differ from Lang’s. Gross recruits another lawyer, Lawrence Oberman, and together they menace Lang and eventually his sister. It is heavily implied that the two of them serve the corporate establishment whose profits Lang’s engine threatens.

By the time Lang realizes he is being taken advantage of, the lawyers have him trapped. He attempts to contact a newspaper reporter, but Gross and Oberman hold his sister hostage to prevent him from telling his story. He then meets a barker at the World’s Fair right before it closes for the night who tells him of a chain letter he has just received, which gives him an idea.

The lawyers try to force Lang into giving them his plans, but he says he no longer has them; the audience finds out from a scene in the newspaper reporter’s office that he and Rita have been killed. The play ends with Bernie, a young friend of the family who has previously shown mechanical aptitude, receiving the plans for the Water Engine in the mail.

== Cast ==
- Joe Mantegna as Lawrence Oberman
- John Mahoney as Mason Gross
- Charles Durning as Tour Guide
- Patti LuPone as Rita Lang
- William H. Macy as Charles Lang
- Treat Williams as Dave Murray
- Joanna Miles as Mrs. Varek
- Mike Nussbaum as Mr. Wallace

== Reception ==
=== Critical response ===
Tom Shales of the Washington Post noted that "Water Engine has a palpable brilliance, and that's in the production design of Barry Robison. At every turn, the look is first-class and imaginative, especially during later scenes set at the Hall of Science of the Chicago World's Fair. You feel you're watching a real movie and not a TV movie." Tony Scott of Variety wrote that "director Steven Schachter goes for an arty mode of some filmmaking, with angled shots, stylized acting, Mamet's pseudo-naturalistic dialogue, and an unswerving storyline from which subplots bloom and fade."

=== Accolades ===
Year	Award	Category	Nominee	Result
1993	CableACE Awards	Directing a Movie or Miniseries	Steven Schachter	Nominated
