= Oleanna (film) =

- Theatrical release poster
- Directed by: David Mamet
- Screenplay by: David Mamet
- Based on: Oleanna by David Mamet
- Produced by: Patricia Wolff; Sarah Green
- Starring: William H. Macy; Debra Eisenstadt
- Cinematography: Andrzej Sekuła
- Edited by: Barbara Tulliver
- Music by: Rebecca Pidgeon
- Production companies: Bay Kinescope; Channel Four Films
- Distributed by: The Samuel Goldwyn Company
- Release date: November 4, 1994
- Running time: 89 minutes
- Countries: United States; United Kingdom
- Language: English
- Box office: $124,693

Oleanna is a 1994 drama film written and directed by David Mamet based on his 1992 play and starring William H. Macy and Debra Eisenstadt. The plot concerns a contentious meeting between a student and a college professor. Macy reprised his role from the original stage production. The film was nominated for an Independent Spirit Award for Best Male Lead.

== Plot ==
Carol, a college student, goes to talk to her professor, John, to discuss a failing grade she received from him. John is on track to be granted tenure and is also anticipating closing a deal on a new house for himself and his wife. Carol is frustrated with the material John teaches, particularly a book written by him. At one point during a heated argument between the two, John puts his hand on her shoulder to comfort her, but Carol recoils at the gesture. Although John initially appears insensitive to Carol's concerns, he tells her he "likes her" and agrees to give her an "A" grade if she'll return to his office to discuss the material.

The second time Carol visits John in his office, she has a more confident demeanor. She has filed a formal complaint against the tenure committee, accusing the professor of sexual harassment. She reveals she has documented occurrences of sexist remarks by John toward his students and has included in her account his offer of an "A" grade in exchange for meeting with him in his office. In protest to Carol, John expresses his incredulity at how his actions could have offended her or could be interpreted as anything other than trying to help her. He wishes to resolve the matter privately with Carol so that the complaint can be withdrawn, but Carol remains obstinate. Before she can leave the office, John blocks the door and grabs hold of her. Carol screams for help.

John eventually is suspended and is denied tenure, with a possible dismissal from the university. During a final meeting with Carol, she is more forceful in naming his specific flaws and reveals that her charges against him have now amounted to attempted rape, an accusation known to be false. She also makes reference to "her group", an organization on whose behalf she speaks and whom she seems to be consulting as she files her complaints. Carol offers to drop her charges against him if John would agree to her group's list of books to be removed from the university, which includes his own. John refuses and angrily tells her to leave his office, then he answers a phone call from his wife. When John affectionately refers to his wife as "baby", Carol tells him not to use that term. This demand causes John to snap completely, and he starts savagely beating her and screaming obscenities. As John calms down, realizing what he's just done, he says "Oh, my God." Carol replies "Yes, that's right."

== Cast ==
- William H. Macy as John
- Debra Eisenstadt as Carol

== Reception ==
=== Release ===
Oleanna had its world premiere on October 23, 1994, at the Chicago International Film Festival. It was given a limited theatrical release on November 4.

=== Critical reception ===
On Rotten Tomatoes, Oleanna holds a rating of 53%, based on 19 reviews.

In a negative review, Kenneth Turan of the Los Angeles Times wrote "David Mamet’s Oleanna, adapted from his two-character play, is about sexual harassment, but it’s the audience for this movie that gets harassed." He added the film never makes it past "the archetypal stage", and that "if Mamet was trying to give equal weight to Carol and John--to the male and female psyche--then he didn’t study his movie-in-progress carefully enough." Peter Travers of Rolling Stone gave a positive review, lauding its "incendiary writing and the potent performances" as "a brilliant dare."

Caryn James of The New York Times wrote that, although Mamet's play might have felt incendiary when it debuted in the aftermath of the Clarence Thomas-Anita Hill hearings, it falls flat on film. James praised Macy's performance, but stated the role of Carol "is the film's deep, inescapable flaw", just as it was in the play. James argued Mamet "allows for only two possibilities: [Carol] is viciously manipulative or seriously self-deluded. Mr. Mamet has loaded the drama so that she cannot be right, a dramatic strategy that shifts the focus away from the slippery he said-she said of sexual harassment and toward Carol's underwritten state of mind. As Carol, Debra Eisenstadt wisely doesn't tip the scales toward lunacy or power lust, but the role itself is hopelessly vague."

Roger Ebert, whose review of the film is primarily about an off-Broadway production he saw over a year earlier, was "astonished" to report that Oleanna was not a very good film, characterizing it as awkward and lacking in "fire and passion". In his review of the film, Ebert expressed his feelings about the original play:

"Experiencing David Mamet's play Oleanna on the stage was one of the most stimulating experiences I've had in a theater. In two acts, he succeeded in enraging all of the audience – the women with the first act, the men with the second. I recall loud arguments breaking out during the intermission and after the play, as the audience spilled out of an off-Broadway theater all worked up over its portrait of ... sexual harassment? Or was it self-righteous Political Correctness?"

William H. Macy was nominated for an Independent Spirit Award for Best Male Lead.
