= Steven Schachter =

American film director

Steven Schachter is an American television, theatre, and film director and screenwriter.

Much of Schachter's success stems from projects on which he has collaborated with William H. Macy. He, Macy, Patricia Cox and director David Mamet co-founded the St. Nicholas Theater company in 1972.They co-wrote the cable television movies The Con (1998), A Slight Case of Murder (1999), Door to Door (2002), and The Wool Cap (2004), all of which Schachter directed and in which Macy starred. He also has directed numerous other made-for-TV movies, including an adaptation of David Mamet's play The Water Engine, which he had directed at the off-Broadway Public Theater in 1977 and again at the Plymouth Theatre on Broadway the following year. In 2006 he directed the TV movie The Mermaid Chair. In May 2007, he completed filming the feature The Deal, written by and starring Macy.

== Filmography ==
=== Television films ===
Year	Title	Director	Writer	Producer
1983	Journey's End	Yes	No	No
1992	Getting Up and Going Home	Yes	No	No
1992	The Water Engine	Yes	No	No
1995	Lady Killer	Yes	No	No
1995	Above Suspicion	Yes	Yes	No
1995	Legacy of Sin: The William Coit Story	Yes	No	No
1996	Every Woman's Dream	Yes	Yes	No
1996	To Face Her Past	Yes	No	No
1998	The Con	Yes	Yes	No
1998	To Live Again	Yes	No	No
1999	A Slight Case of Murder	Yes	Yes	No
2000	For All Time	Yes	No	No
2002	Door to Door	Yes	Yes	No
2002	Just a Walk in the Park	Yes	Yes	No
2004	It Must Be Love	Yes	No	No
2004	The Wool Cap	Yes	Yes	Yes
2005	The Engagement Ring	Yes	No	No
2006	The Mermaid Chair	Yes	No	No
2008	The Deal	Yes	Yes	No
2008	Family Man	Yes	Yes	Executive
2010	Unanswered Prayers	Yes	No	No

=== Television series ===
Year	Title	Director	Writer	Episode
1990	ABC Afterschool Specials	Yes	No	''All That Glitters''
1991	Thirtysomething	No	Yes	''Sifting the Ashes''
1992	Home Fires	No	Yes	''Fathers and Sons''
2012	Shameless	No	Yes	''Can I Have a Mother''

=== Theatrical films ===
Year	Title	Role
1985	The Falcon and the Snowman	Assistant to John Schlesinger
1986	Firewalker	Dialogue coach: Mr. Norris

== As theatrical director ==
Year	Title
1976	A View from a Bridge
1977	Mert & Phil
1978	Ashes
1985	The Water Engine
1988	Big Time: Scenes from a Service Economy
1989	Stained Glass
1990	The Pink Studio

== Awards and nominations ==
Awards

- 1999 Lone Star Film & Television Award for Best TV Teleplay (The Con)
- 2000 Edgar Allan Poe Award for Best Television Feature or Miniseries (A Slight Case of Murder)
- 2003 Emmy Award for Outstanding Directing for a Miniseries, Movie or a Dramatic Special (Door to Door)
- 2003 Emmy Award for Outstanding Writing for a Miniseries, Movie or a Dramatic Special (Door to Door)

Nominations

- 2003 Humanitas Prize for Writing, Television Movie 90 Minutes or Longer (Door to Door)
- 2003 Writers Guild of America Award (Door to Door)
- 2005 Emmy Award for Outstanding Made for Television Movie (The Wool Cap)
- 2005 Writers Guild of America Award (The Wool Cap)
