= Kalan Porter discography =

- Studio albums: 2
- Singles: 6
- Music videos: 5

Canadian singer-songwriter Kalan Porter has released two studio albums, six singles, and five music videos. Porter rose to prominence after winning the second season of Canadian Idol in 2004. His coronation single, "Awake in a Dream", spent eight weeks atop the Canadian Singles Chart and set the record for the best-selling debut single for a Canadian artist. Both of Porter's albums reached the top ten of the Canadian Albums Chart.

== Albums ==
=== Studio albums ===
Title	Details	Peak position	Certifications
Title	Details	CAN	Certifications
219 Days	Released: November 23, 2004; Label: Sony BMG; Format: CD	4	MC: 2× Platinum
Wake Up Living	Released: August 28, 2007; Label: Sony BMG; Format: CD, digital download	7	
"—" denotes release that did not chart.

== Singles ==
Title	Year	Peak chart positions				Certifications	Album
Title	Year	CAN	CAN AC	CAN CHR	CAN HAC	Certifications	Album
"Awake in a Dream"	2004	1	3	—	25	MC: 8× Platinum	219 Days
"Single"	2005	—	—	17	—		219 Days
"In Spite of It All"	2005	—	—	—	—		219 Days
"Down in Heaven"	2007	25	7	—	7		Wake Up Living
"Destination (Where I Belong)"	2007	—	—	—	—		Wake Up Living
"Hurray"	2008	—	—	—	—		Wake Up Living
"—" denotes release that did not chart.

== Music videos ==
Year	Song	Album
2004	"Single"	219 Days
2005	"In Spite of It All"	219 Days
2007	"Down In Heaven"	Wake Up Living
2007	"Destination (Where I Belong)"	Wake Up Living
2008	"Hurray"	Wake Up Living
