= Too Young =

Too Young may refer to:

== Music ==
=== Albums ===
- Too Young (album), a 1972 album by Donny Osmond

=== Songs ===
- "Too Young" (Jack Wagner song)
- "Too Young" (Phoenix song)
- "Too Young" (Post Malone song)
- "Too Young" (Queensberry song)
- "Too Young" (Sidney Lippman and Sylvia Dee song), written by Sidney Lippman, lyrics by Sylvia Dee, first published in 1951
- "Too Young", by Bear Hands from You'll Pay for This, 2016
- "Too Young", by Benny Mardones from Never Run, Never Hide, 1980
- "Too Young", by Louis Tomlinson from Walls, 2020
- "Too Young", by Sabrina Carpenter from Eyes Wide Open, 2015

== Other uses ==
- "Too Young" (Adventure Time), an episode of the TV series Adventure Time
- 2 Young, a 2005 Hong Kong film
- Too Young, a music consultancy founded by Frederic Schindler

== See also ==
- Too Much Too Young (disambiguation)
