= One Last Try =

One Last Try may refer to:

- "One Last Try", a song by Ane Brun from the deluxe edition of It All Starts with One
- "One Last Try", a song by Howard Jones from In the Running
- "One Last Try", a song by Kalan Porter from Wake Up Living
- "One Last Try", a song by Romy from Mid Air (Romy album)
- "One Last Try", a song by Marte Eberson
