= Frequent flyer (disambiguation) =

Frequent flyer may refer to:

- Frequent Flyer (film), a 1996 made-for-TV movie
- Frequent flyer program, a system of rewards offered by airlines
- Frequent flyer program (Guantanamo), a sleep deprivation technique
