= These Old Charms =

Studio album by Theresa Sokyrka
- Released: April 26, 2005
- Genre: Folk, Indie pop
- Label: Maple Music

Theresa Sokyrka chronology
These Old Charms (2005)	Something Is Expected (2006)

These Old Charms is the debut album by Canadian Idol finalist Theresa Sokyrka, released across Canada on April 26, 2005.

== Album information ==
The album includes favorites she had performed on Idol, a number of old jazz standards, as well as three original songs written by Sokyrka herself.

== Reception ==
It debuted at #4 on the Canadian charts and was certified gold in June 2005.

== Awards and nominations ==
These Old Charms was also nominated for a Juno Award in the category of Pop Album of the Year against Jann Arden and (ultimate winner) Michael Bublé as well as fellow Canadian Idol Kalan Porter.

== Track listing ==
1. "Angel Eyes"
2. "This Masquerade"
3. "God Bless The Child"
4. "Corcovado (Quiet Nights Of Quiet Stars)"
5. "Summertime"
6. "Come Away With Me"
7. "She Let Her Hair Down"
8. "Change The World"
9. "Turned My Back"
10. "Cruisin'"
11. "Good Mother"
