= List of number-one singles of 2004 (Canada) =

The following lists the number one best-selling singles in Canada in 2004 which was published in Billboard magazine under the Hits of the World section. Only songs released as physical singles qualified for this chart during this time. During this period, the singles market in Canada was very limited in both scope and availability and, in many cases, these songs received little or no radio support. For tracks other than those by American Idol or Canadian Idol winners, sales were likely to be less than 1,000 per week. Nevertheless, this was the only singles chart Canadians had until June 2007, when the Canadian Hot 100 was released to the public. It also lists other big hits in the sales chart.

Note that Billboard publishes charts with an issue date approximately 7–10 days in advance.

== Chart history ==
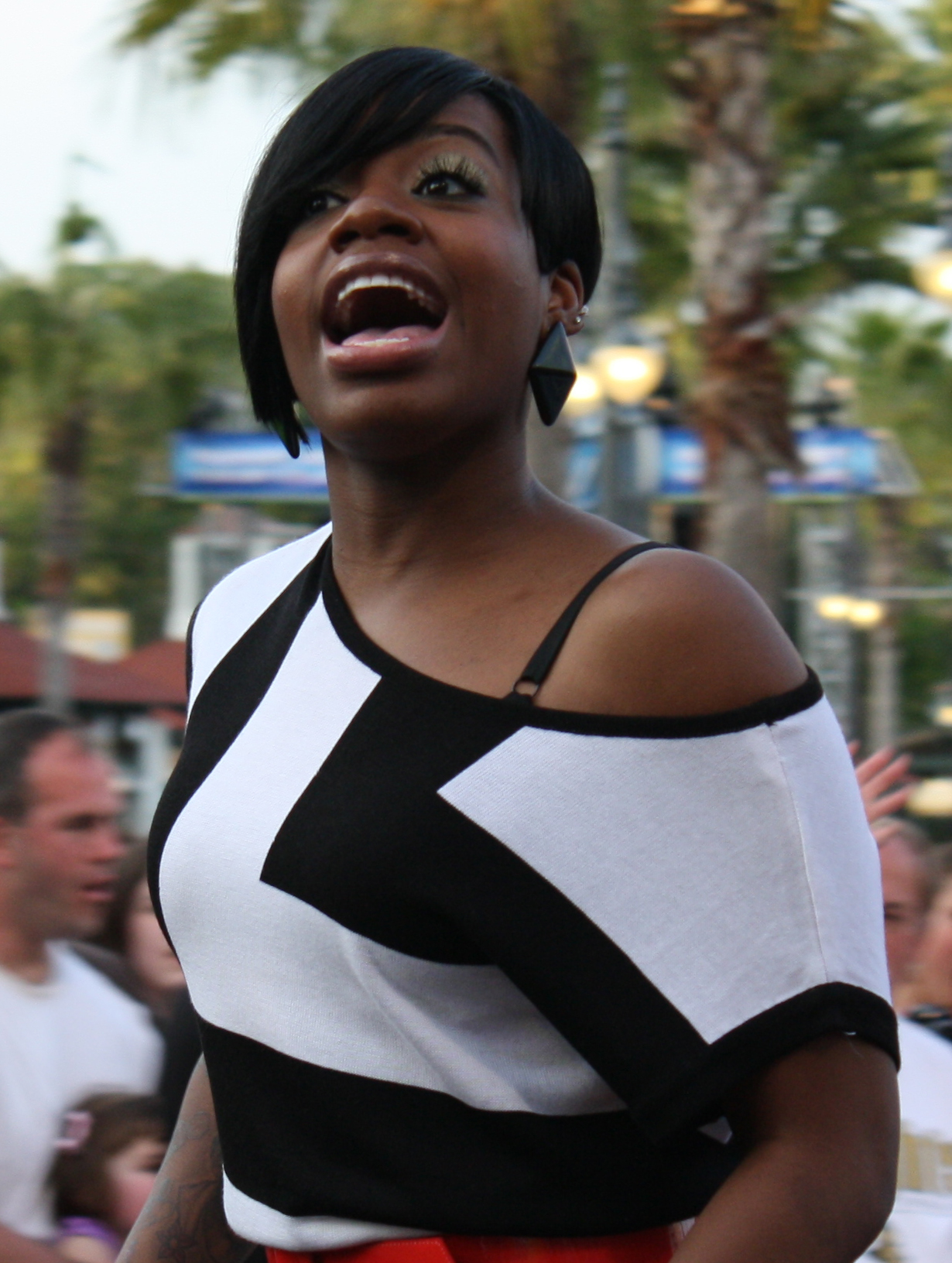
American Idol winner, Fantasia, spent 10 weeks at number-one with "I Believe" in mid-2004.

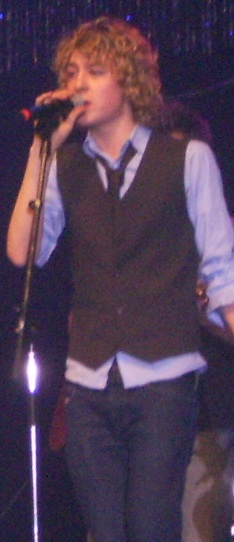
One of the two Canadian Idol winners to have a number-one single in 2004, Kalan Porter's "Awake in a Dream" spent 8 weeks at number-one in late 2004.

Issue date	Song	Artist(s)	Ref.
January 3	"Something More"	Ryan Malcolm	
January 10	"Something More"	Ryan Malcolm	
January 17	"Hey Ya!"	OutKast	
January 24	"Hey Ya!"	OutKast	
January 31	"Hey Ya!"	OutKast	
February 7	"My Immortal"	Evanescence	
February 14	"Hey Ya!"	OutKast	
February 21	"Hey Ya!"	OutKast	
February 28	"Hey Ya!"	OutKast	
March 6	"Hey Ya!"	OutKast	
March 13	"Hey Ya!"	OutKast	
March 20	"My Immortal"	Evanescence	
March 27	"Toxic"	Britney Spears	
April 3	"Toxic"	Britney Spears	
April 10	"The Way" / "Solitaire"	Clay Aiken	
April 17	"The Way" / "Solitaire"	Clay Aiken	
April 24	"The Way" / "Solitaire"	Clay Aiken	
May 1	"Yeah!"	Usher featuring Lil Jon & Ludacris	
May 8	"Yeah!"	Usher featuring Lil Jon & Ludacris	
May 15	"Yeah!"	Usher featuring Lil Jon & Ludacris	
May 22	"Yeah!"	Usher featuring Lil Jon & Ludacris	
May 29	"Yeah!"	Usher featuring Lil Jon & Ludacris	
June 5	"Yeah!"	Usher featuring Lil Jon & Ludacris	
June 12	"Yeah!"	Usher featuring Lil Jon & Ludacris	
June 19	"Yeah!"	Usher featuring Lil Jon & Ludacris	
June 26	"Ch-Check It Out"	Beastie Boys	
July 3	"Yeah!"	Usher featuring Lil Jon & Ludacris	
July 10	"I Believe"	Fantasia	
July 17	"I Believe"	Fantasia	
July 24	"I Believe"	Fantasia	
July 31	"I Believe"	Fantasia	
August 7	"I Believe"	Fantasia	
August 14	"I Believe"	Fantasia	
August 21	"I Believe"	Fantasia	
August 28	"I Believe"	Fantasia	
September 4	"I Believe"	Fantasia	
September 11	"I Believe"	Fantasia	
September 18	"American Idiot"	Green Day	
September 25	"American Idiot"	Green Day	
October 2	"American Idiot"	Green Day	
October 9	"American Idiot"	Green Day	
October 16	"Yeah!"	Usher featuring Lil Jon & Ludacris	
October 23	"Awake in a Dream"	Kalan Porter	
October 30	"Awake in a Dream"	Kalan Porter	
November 6	"Awake in a Dream"	Kalan Porter	
November 13	"Awake in a Dream"	Kalan Porter	
November 20	"Awake in a Dream"	Kalan Porter	
November 27	"Awake in a Dream"	Kalan Porter	
December 4	"Awake in a Dream"	Kalan Porter	
December 11	"Awake in a Dream"	Kalan Porter	
December 18	"Do They Know It's Christmas?"	Band Aid 20	
December 25	"Do They Know It's Christmas?"	Band Aid 20	
