= Michael Buie =

Canadian film and television actor

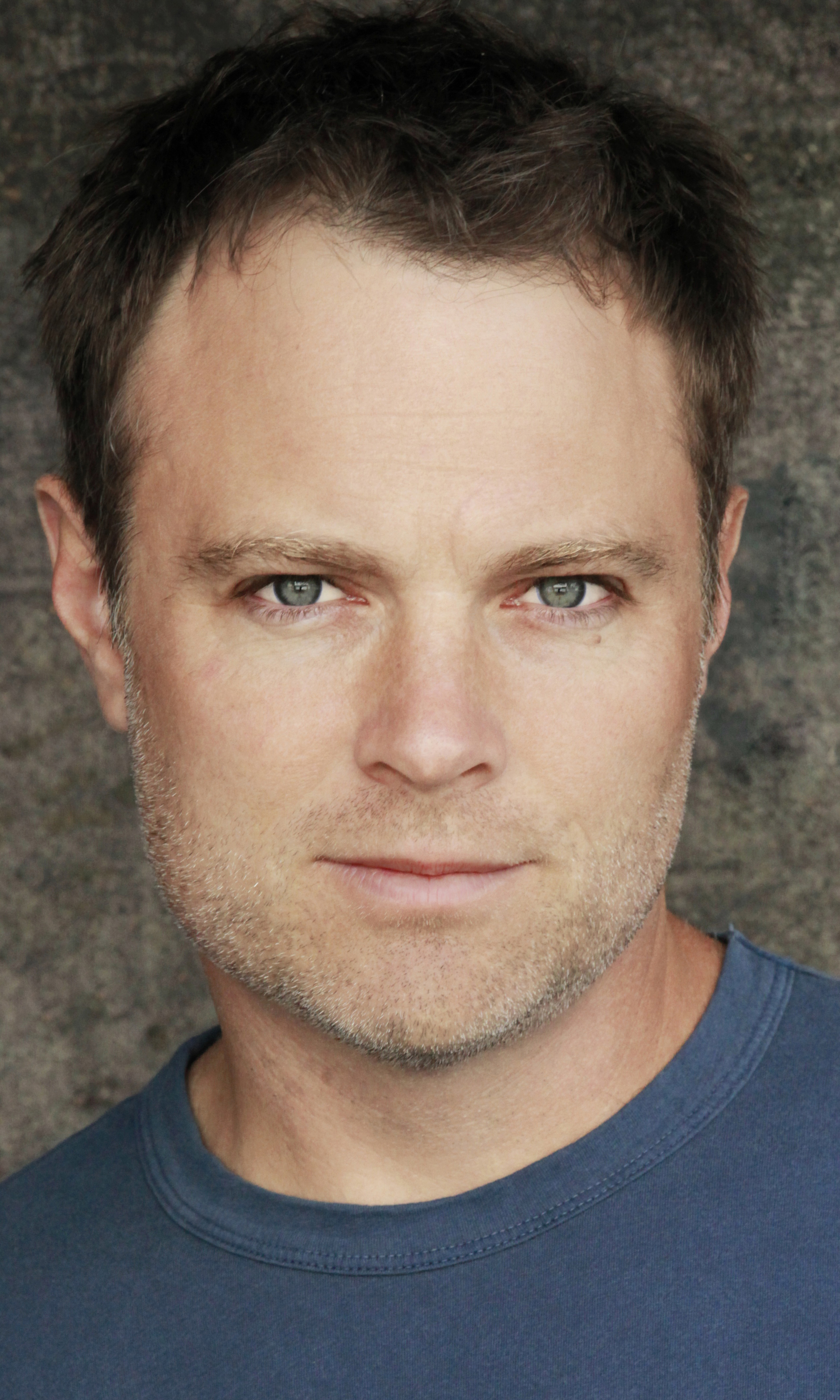
- Michael Buie in 2013
- Born: Kitchener, Ontario
- Occupations: film and television actor
- Years active: 1994–present

Michael Buie is a Canadian-born film and television actor, known primarily for portraying Fox News anchor Bret Baier in the 2019 film Bombshell, and his recurring role as Paul Dawson on the long-running ABC television series Grey's Anatomy.

== Background and early years ==
Buie was born in Kitchener, Ontario, the eldest of six brothers. He graduated with a bachelor's degree from the University of Western Ontario before attending the American Academy of Dramatic Arts in Pasadena, California.

== Acting career ==
=== Film ===
In 1999, Buie starred in Mystery, Alaska, playing a Canadian ice hockey player named Connor Banks who is arrested for a shooting. Buie told a Los Angeles Times interviewer that the cast practiced hockey so much that many of the film's scenes on the ice rink were performed by the actors themselves rather than stand-ins. Saying he was "immensely proud of that", Buie described himself as "a mediocre hockey player who gets to live the dream in this film".

In 2010, Buie appeared with co-stars Elizabeth Banks, Ty Simpkins, Russell Crowe, and Moran Atias at the New York premiere of The Next Three Days, a feature film in which he played the role of Mick Brennan. In Blackbird, which won the Best Canadian First Feature Film Award at the 2012 Toronto International Film Festival, Buie played the part of a gun-collector father whose troubled teenage son is accused of plotting a school shooting.

Buie portrayed Fox News anchor Bret Baier in the 2019 film Bombshell, about the Roger Ailes scandal at the conservative network. In a pictorial review, USA Today compared his appearance to Baier's, along with the other leading cast members to their Fox News characters. In a wide-ranging, 24-minute interview by Adnan Virk on the Cinephile with Adnan Virk podcast in December 2019, Buie discussed various film roles he had had, as well as his thoughts on other recent films and their casts, and his long standing friendship with Russell Crowe. Questioned about his role playing Bret Baier in Bombshell, Buie said he practiced some of the Fox newsman's speech mannerisms prior to filming, but did not talk to Baier until after filming wrapped. When they did speak to each other, Buie said that Baier liked his portrayal and thought it was "good", joking that "he's never looked better".

Buie's other film credits include Cedar Rapids and Ropewalk.

=== Television ===
One of Buie's earliest roles was a character named Mike in the 1994 television film For the Love of Nancy, about an anorexic teenage girl played by Tracey Gold. He also played the character Paul Dawson in the ninth season of the long-running ABC television series Grey's Anatomy, and King Agon in Inhumans, also on ABC. Buie had a leading role in the made-for-television film Hard Time in 1998, playing a detective opposite Charles Durning and Burt Reynolds, and its two sequels in the following year, Hard Time: The Premonition and Hard Time: Hostage Hotel.

Buie's other television appearances include:

- Republic of Doyle
- Hawaii Five-0 (2010 version)
- Prime Suspect
- Our Mother's Murder (1997 version)
- Millennium
- The Outer Limits (1995 version)
- Madison
- Smoke (upcoming TV series)

== Writing and directing ==
Buie wrote and directed a film short, The Lake, in 2015 based on his stepfather's terminal illness. The film won the Jury Award for "Best Dramatic Short" at the Sonoma International Film Festival. Previously, Buie wrote, directed, and appeared in a music video for The Trews entitled If You Wanna Start Again, from the Canadian rock group's 2011 hit album Hope & Ruin.
