= Clif Magness =

American musician

- Born: Clifton Magness; Lubbock, Texas, U.S.
- Genres: Pop, rock, adult contemporary, folk/pop, alternative
- Occupations: Lyricist, singer-songwriter, producer
- Instruments: Vocals, guitar, keyboards, drums, bass guitar, programming, engineering
- Years active: 1973–present
- Website: www.cliftonmagness.com

Clifton "Clif" Magness is an American singer, songwriter, record producer, and multi-instrumentalist, best known for co-writing and producing several tracks on Avril Lavigne’s 2002 debut album, Let Go including the song "Losing Grip".

At the 33rd Grammy Awards, Magness won a Grammy Award for Best Instrumental Arrangement Accompanying Vocal(s) for the song "The Places You Find Love" from Quincy Jones' album, Back On The Block. He received nominations for an Academy Award, Golden Globe Award, and Grammy for the theme song "The Day I Fall In Love" from the film Beethoven's 2nd.

== Collaborations ==
Magness worked with Lavigne on her multi-platinum debut album, Let Go, co-writing five tracks and producing 6, including "Losing Grip", Mobile, "Unwanted", "My World", and "Too Much to Ask". Let Go reached the top of the albums chart in Canada and the U.K., as high as #2 on the Billboard 200, and finished the year at #14 on Billboard's 200 Albums for 2002. Prior to leaving New York for Los Angeles to collaborate with Magness, Lavigne was assigned cowriters by her label, Arista, who "failed to click with a girl who'd just discovered guitar-based rock". Magness gave Lavigne the creative freedom she desired. "The harder-rocking songs on Let Go – specifically 'Losing Grip' and 'Unwanted' – had the sound she wanted for the whole album."

Following up his collaboration with Lavigne, Magness went on to work with original American Idol winner Kelly Clarkson on her debut album Thankful. The #1 album featured two productions by Magness. He co-wrote and produced two songs from Clarkson's multi-platinum second album, Breakaway. Magness also produced five songs for another American Idol contestant, Clay Aiken, on his debut album, Measure of a Man, including the single "Solitaire", which topped the 2004 Canadian chart for 4 weeks. Magness produced the longest radio air played song in Australian history, "Perfect", for Vanessa Amorosi.

Magness co-wrote the first single "Lights Out" and five other songs with Lisa Marie Presley from her debut album, To Whom It May Concern. The album debuted at No. 5 on the Billboard 200 album chart.

Early in his career, Magness co-wrote and produced the title track "All I Need" on Jack Wagner's debut album All I Need. In 1985, the song spent 2 weeks at the top of Billboard's Adult Contemporary chart. In 1990, Magness' collaboration with songwriter Steve Kipner resulted in a Billboard top 5 single for Wilson Phillips' "Impulsive".

Magness has either co-written and/or produced tracks for Celine Dion, Jessica Simpson, Amy Grant, Billy Idol, Hanson, Steve Perry, O-Town, Charlotte Martin, Rachel Loy, Teddy Pendergrass, Wild Orchid, Ted Nugent, Judith Owen, Jude, Joe Bonamassa, The Urge, Idina Menzel, Bo Bice, Clay Aiken, Evelyn "Champaigne" King, Kyle Vincent, Marie Digby, Andreya Triana, Dara Sedaka, Sam Harris, Days Difference, Ill Scarlett, Lee Greenwood, Gob, Thelma Houston, Larry Graham, Ivy Lies, Christina Grimmie, Caroline Sunshine, Jermaine Jackson, Barbra Streisand, Julio Iglesias, Sheena Easton, George Benson, Vanessa Amorosi, Patti Austin and Al Jarreau.

== Awards and nominations ==
=== Grammy Awards ===
- 1990 – Best Instrumental Arrangement Accompanying Vocal(s) – Won
  - Glen Ballard, Jerry Hey, Quincy Jones and Clif Magness (arrangers) for "The Places You Find Love" performed by Siedah Garrett & Chaka Khan
- 1994 – Best Song Written Specifically for a Motion Picture or for Television – Nominated
  - Carole Bayer Sager, Clif Magness, and James Ingram, for "The Day I Fall In Love" performed by Dolly Parton and James Ingram

=== Academy Awards ===
- 1993 – Music (Original Song) – Nominated
  - Carole Bayer Sager, Clif Magness, and James Ingram, for "The Day I Fall In Love" performed by Dolly Parton and James Ingram

=== Golden Globe Awards ===
- 1993 – Best Original Song – Motion Picture – Nominated
  - Carole Bayer Sager, Clif Magness, and James Ingram, for "The Day I Fall In Love" performed by Dolly Parton and James Ingram

== Discography ==
=== Studio albums ===
- Solo (1994)
- Lucky Dog (2018)
- Road to Gold: Official Collection of Lost Demos (2022)

=== with Planet 3 ===
- A Heart from the Big Machine (1991)
- Music From the Planet (1992) (European version of A Heart from the Big Machine, with one song replaced)
- Gems Unearthed (2004)

=== Singles ===
- "There's Nothing So Expensive as a Woman Who's Free for the Night" (1980) (as Clif Newton)
- "Rest of the Night" (1980) (as Clif Newton)
- "Footprints in the Rain" (1994)
- "Flower Girl" (1994)
- "Impulsive" (Wilson Phillips) (1990)
- "Low" (Kelly Clarkson) (2002)
- "Losin' Grip" (Avril Lavigne) (2001)
- "Mobile" (Avril Lavigne) (2001)
- "Perfect" (Vanessa Amorosi) (2007) The longest radio airplaying single in Australian history.
- "Crawl" (Vanessa Amorosi) (2008)

=== Soundtrack appearances ===
- "Incommunicado", "Never Crossed My Mind" Clif Magness (from The Last Starfighter) (1984)
- "Top of the Hill", "Hold On" Clif Magness (from Hot Dog: The Movie) (1984)
- "Love, It's Just The Way It Goes" John Farnam & Sarah Taylor (from The Slugger's Wife) (1985)
- "I Don't Want To Say Goodnight" Planet 3 (from Navy Seals) (1990)
- "Alive" Marie Digby (from The Breakup Girl) (2013)
- "One Way Out" Mr. Big (from Caddyshack 2) (1988)
- "I Will Survive" Cheap Trick (from Gladiator) (1988)
- "It's Gonna Be Special" Patti Austin (from Two Of A Kind) (1983)
- "I Know" Jude (from City Of Angels) (1997)
- "Mobile" Avril Lavigne (from The Medallion, Wimbledon, and Just Married) (2001)
- "I Always Get What I Want" Avril Lavigne (from "The Princess Diaries II") (2001)
