= For the Love of Nancy =

1994 American TV Film

- DVD cover
- Genre: Drama
- Written by: Carol Evan McKeand; Nigel McKeand
- Directed by: Paul Schneider
- Starring: Tracey Gold
- Music by: Dan Slider
- Country of origin: United States
- Original language: English

Production
- Executive producers: Vin Di Bona; Lloyd Weintraub
- Producer: Harry R. Sherman
- Production location: Vancouver
- Cinematography: Eric Van Haren Noman
- Editor: Andrew Cohen
- Running time: 100 minutes
- Production company: Vin Di Bona Productions

Original release
- Network: ABC
- Release: October 2, 1994

For the Love of Nancy is a 1994 American made-for-television drama film directed by Paul Schneider. The film, based on a true story, deals with anorexia nervosa. Lead actress Tracey Gold was actually recovering from the disease while making the movie and used her own life experience for the portrayal of Nancy.

Nancy, a recent high school graduate, finds herself grappling with uncertainty about the future. After a noticeable change in her body, she becomes fixated on her appearance and withdraws from others, spending most of her time alone. As she struggles with an increasing obsession over her weight, she pushes away those around her, leading to growing concern from people who notice her drastic transformation.

Her health begins to deteriorate, though she refuses to seek help, even as the pressure to confront her issues grows. Ultimately, Nancy reluctantly admits to her condition but remains resistant to treatment. With time and intervention, she begins to face her struggles and slowly works toward recovery, learning to open up about her challenges and take steps to regain control over her life.

== Cast ==
- Tracey Gold as Nancy Walsh
- Jill Clayburgh as Sally Walsh
- Cameron Bancroft as Patrick Walsh
- Mark-Paul Gosselaar as Tommy Walsh
- Deanna Milligan as Debbie
- Michael MacRae as Uncle Tommy
- William Devane as Tom Walsh
- Garwin Sanford as Dr. Partana
- Michael Buie as Mike
