= Theresa Sokyrka =

Canadian singer-songwriter (born 1981)

- Born: 1 April 1981 (age 45); Moose Jaw, Saskatchewan, Canada
- Genres: Pop, folk, Jazz
- Occupation: Singer-songwriter
- Instruments: Vocals, Acoustic Guitar
- Years active: 2004–present
- Label: Independent

Theresa Sokyrka (born 1 April 1981) is a Canadian singer-songwriter. On the second season of Canadian Idol, she was the final runner-up to winner Kalan Porter.

== Biography ==
Born in Moose Jaw, Saskatchewan, Sokyrka studied music at Red Deer College in Red Deer, Alberta. She is drawn to the blues and jazz more than other musical genres, and sings with passion and vulnerability. She loves to scat, adding flair and style to her songs. During an Idol taping, Lionel Richie said there was "the soul of an old black woman living inside her". She comes from a very musical family, and she plays the violin, guitar, and piano.

She was the Saskatchewan Centennial 2005 Youth Ambassador.

Sokyrka currently lives in Saskatoon, Saskatchewan. Her 2013 album, Prairie Winds was recorded, mixed and mastered in Madrid, Spain in two weeks.

== Canadian Idol ==
On the second season of Canadian Idol, Sokyrka was known for scatting during her songs, the grace she showed during the judges' critiques, and her friendly personality. Zack Werner once said she was his favourite singer on the show from the first two seasons. A memorable comment made about Sokyrka came from judge Jake Gold; he said "Your future is so bright, I've got to wear shades" as he put on his sunglasses. Kalan Porter said it was great ending the show with Theresa, and that she had something really special to offer. The duet they performed during the finale, "True Colors", was arguably one of the most touching moments in Canadian Idol history.

Songs that Theresa performed during the season included:

Week	Song Sung	Artist
1st Audition	"God Bless the Child"	Billie Holiday
Toronto Audition No. 1 Group Performance	"You've Got a Friend"	James Taylor
Toronto Audition No. 2 Duet Performance with Mohanza Kelly	"Unforgettable"	Nat King Cole
Toronto Audition No. 3 Solo Performance	"Try"	Blue Rodeo
Top 32	"Summertime"	Eva Cassidy
Top 10	"Good Mother"	Jann Arden
Top 9	"There's a Kind of Hush"	Herman's Hermits
Top 8	"Piece of My Heart"	Janis Joplin
Top 7	"Hello"	Lionel Richie
Top 6	"Song For a Winter's Night"	Gordon Lightfoot; Sarah McLachlan
Top 5	"Cruisin'"	Smokey Robinson
Top 4	"It's Only a Paper Moon" "Dream a Little Dream"	Ella Fitzgerald; Louis Armstrong
Top 3	"What The World Needs Now Is Love" "Ready For Love"	Jackie DeShannon; India.Arie
Top 2	"Awake in a Dream" "Come Away With Me" "Cruisin'"	Idol Single; Norah Jones; Smokey Robinson

Her standout songs on the show were "Summertime", "Good Mother", "Song For A Winter's Night", "Cruisin", "Ready for Love", and "Come Away with Me".

== Discography ==
=== Studio albums ===
Year	Album details	Peak	Certifications (sales threshold)
Year	Album details	CA	Certifications (sales threshold)
2005	These Old Charms: Released: 26 April 2005; Label: Independent; Format: CD	4	CA sales: 70,000; CRIA: Gold
2006	Something Is Expected: Released: 5 September 2006; Label: Maple; Format: CD	7	CA sales: 13,000
2007	Wrapped in Ribbon: Released: 5 November 2007; Label: Independent; Format: CD	—	
2010	Theresa Sokyrka – Ukrainian Roots: Released: 30 November 2010; Label: Independent; Format: CD, digital download	—	
2013	Prairie Winds: Released: 4 June 2013; Label: Independent; Format: CD, digital download	—	
"—" denotes releases that did not chart

=== EPs ===
- Four Hours in November EP (2004)

=== Singles ===
- "Turned My Back" (2005)
- "Waiting Song" (2006)
- "Sandy Eyes" (2007)
- "Baby, It's Cold Outside" (2007)
- "Everything" (2010)
- "Our House" with Jesse Brown (2020)
- "Let It Go (James Bay song)" with Jesse Brown (2020)
- "Time After Time" with Jesse Brown (2020)
- "Someone You Loved" with Jesse Brown (2020)
- "In Your Eyes" with Jesse Brown (2021)
- "Hello" with Jesse Brown (2021)
- "True Colors" with Simon Jasienuk (2021)
- "1/4 of My Eggs Left" (2022)

=== Other appearances ===
In addition to the above mentioned, Sokyrka was featured on Kalan Porter's album "219 Days" (2004). Also "Baby, It's Cold Outside" a single with Matt Dusk in 2007.
