= Dance 'til Dawn =

1988 television film directed by Paul Schneider

- DVD cover
- Genre: Comedy
- Written by: Andrew Guerdat; Steven Kreinberg
- Directed by: Paul Schneider
- Starring: Christina Applegate; Alyssa Milano; Brian Bloom; Tracey Gold; Chris Young; Tempestt Bledsoe; Matthew Perry; Alan Thicke; Kelsey Grammer
- Original language: English

Production
- Executive producers: Frank Konigsberg; Larry Sanitsky
- Producer: Whitney Green
- Production locations: Los Angeles; Simi Valley, California; Aero Theatre - 1328 Montana Avenue, Santa Monica, California
- Cinematography: Stevan Larner
- Editor: Scott K. Wallace
- Running time: 100 minutes
- Production company: The Konigsberg/Sanitsky Company

Original release
- Network: NBC
- Release: October 23, 1988

Dance 'til Dawn is a 1988 made for television teen movie directed by Paul Schneider.

== Plot ==
It's the day of the senior prom at Herbert Hoover High School. The celebration has been organized by one of the popular girls at the school, Patrice Johnson (Christina Applegate).

When Shelley Sheridan (Alyssa Milano) and her jock boyfriend Kevin McCrea (Brian Bloom) break up just before the prom because she refuses to sleep with him, they are both forced to try to find new dates on short notice.

When Shelley can't find a new date, she lies to her friends and tells them that she is going to a college frat party instead. In fact she goes to the town cinema to watch an old horror movie, where she assumes that she will not run into anyone from school. But she bumps into Dan Lefcourt (Chris Young), one of the school geeks, who has also gone to the cinema to avoid the prom. Dan has lied to his father (Alan Thicke), telling him that he was going to the prom because he didn't want his father to find out that he has a low social status at school and couldn't get a date. Dan helps Shelley avoid being seen by another group of students, and she soon discovers that he is a really nice guy.

After one of Kevin's friends tells him a false story about an unpopular girl at the school, Angela Strull (Tracey Gold), being "easy", Kevin decides to invite her to the prom. Angela is delighted to be going to the prom with Kevin. Her friend Margaret (Tempestt Bledsoe) is initially supportive, but later becomes skeptical of Kevin's motives. Not only does Kevin have to try to hoodwink Margaret into believing that his intentions are honorable, he also has to contend with Angela's overprotective, religious fanatic pharmacist father, Ed (Kelsey Grammer), who tries to follow the two "lovebirds" all night, eventually getting arrested for his trouble.

Meanwhile, Patrice is confident that she'll be named the prom queen when her only real competition, Shelley, doesn't show up at the prom. To that end, she's arranged for an all-night celebration with her boyfriend Roger (Matthew Perry), who she keeps on a short string. But then Angela appears in Cinderella fashion, and Angela and Kevin are voted prom queen and king.

Kevin tries to get Angela into bed, but she resists and confronts him about his real reasons for asking her out. When he explains that he really does like her now, she points out that he should have respected her from the start.

The film concludes at Hudson's, aka "Hud's," a popular diner where everyone shows up the morning after the prom. Angela has learned that her parents had to get married because they conceived her while they were high school students; confident after her night as prom queen, she informs them she's going to art school in Italy rather than Bible college. Kevin fails to have sex and defends Angela's honor when his friend makes a lewd comment. Meanwhile, Shelley and Dan announce that they are now going steady, and kiss much to the shock of every senior in the room.

== Cast ==
Teens

- Christina Applegate as Patrice Johnson
- Alyssa Milano as Shelley Sheridan
- Brian Bloom as Kevin McCrea
- Tracey Gold as Angela Strull
- Chris Young as Dan Lefcourt
- Tempestt Bledsoe as Margaret
- Matthew Perry as Roger

Parents

- Alan Thicke as Jack Lefcourt
- Kelsey Grammer as Ed Strull
- Edie McClurg as Ruth Strull
- Cliff De Young as Larry Johnson
- Mary Frann as Nancy Johnson

Others

- Lewis Arquette as Pawnshop Owner

== Reception ==
Motion picture-historian Leonard Maltin gave the picture a mediocre review: "Yet another variation on the 'TV-star-teens Vs. TV-star-parents' theme; most of the good songs and funny moments are borrowed from other, better films (notably Murder by Death, Where the Boys Are, and The Monster Squad). A nice try, but hardly the next American Graffiti."
