= Too Young (Jack Wagner song) =

Single by Jack Wagner

from the album Lighting Up the Night
- B-side: "Remember Me Laughing"
- Released: 1985
- Recorded: 1985
- Genre: Pop rock
- Length: 4:07
- Label: Qwest Records
- Songwriters: David Foster; Jay Graydon; Steve Kipner; Donny Osmond
- Producers: Glen Ballard; Clif Magness

Jack Wagner singles chronology
"Lady of My Heart" (1985)	"Too Young" (1985)	"Love Can Take Us All the Way" (1986)

"Too Young" is a song by American actor and singer Jack Wagner. It was released as a single in 1985 from his second album, Lighting Up the Night.

The song was written by David Foster, Jay Graydon, Steve Kipner and Donny Osmond and was produced by Glen Ballard and Clif Magness. It reached number 52 on the Billboard Hot 100 and remained on the chart for fourteen weeks. On the Billboard Adult Contemporary chart, the song peaked at number 15. In Canada, the song reached number 4 on its Adult Contemporary chart.

== Charts ==
Chart (1985–1986)	Peak position
U.S. Billboard Hot 100	52
U.S. Billboard Adult Contemporary	15
Canadian Adult Contemporary	4
