= Hard Time (film) =

1998 film by Burt Reynolds

- Written by: David S. Cass Sr. Steve Wesley
- Directed by: Burt Reynolds
- Starring: Burt Reynolds; Charles Durning; Robert Loggia; Billy Dee Williams; Mia Sara; Roddy Piper; Buck Taylor
- Music by: Snuff Garrett; Clarke Rigsby; Kevin Stoller
- Country of origin: United States
- Original language: English

Production
- Executive producers: Robert Halmi Jr. Scott Garen
- Producer: David S. Cass Sr.
- Cinematography: Suki Medencevic
- Editor: Glenn Farr
- Running time: 90 minutes
- Production company: Larry Levinson Productions

Original release
- Network: TNT
- Release: December 13, 1998

Hard Time is a 1998 American made-for-television action crime film directed by and starring Burt Reynolds. This film premiered on TNT on December 13, 1998.

It is followed by two sequels, The Premonition and Hostage Hotel (both in 1999). It was always envisioned as a trilogy.

== Plot ==
Logan McQueen, a Vietnam War veteran and Miami police officer, chases two briefcase thieves down an alley. One of the thieves knocks him down, steals his gun and shoots the other thief Pepe with it. Logan is put in prison pending investigation but his bail is provided by the mob, who expect him to return money that is missing from the stolen briefcase. Logan begins to suspect that someone in his own police department is framing him for the crimes but the mob has now given him an opportunity to seek the truth.

== Cast ==
- Burt Reynolds as Detective Logan McQueen
- Charles Durning as Detective Charlie Duffy
- Robert Loggia as "Connie" Martin
- Mia Sara as Myler
- Billy Dee Williams as Leo Barker
- Paco Christian Prieto as Catarato Estevez
- John D'Aquino as Ray Hertz
- Roddy Piper as Randy
- Buck Taylor as Captain Adam Gunther
- Ja'net Dubois as "Lefty"
- Michael Buie as Higgs
- Jack Sheldon as Trumpet
- Grace Una as Nguyen
- Gene LeBell as Eddie
- Clint Lilley as "Chu-Chu"
- Danny Arroyo as Pepe

== Production ==
Burt Reynolds made the film after starring in Boogie Nights.

TNT approached Reynolds with the offer to star in three television films, one of which he would direct.

The films were all set in Florida but shot in Los Angeles because it was cheaper.

Reynolds said he liked the film because he liked the idea of watching someone who had strong views on capital punishment change his mind. Reynolds said the character was like his father Burt Sr.

Reynolds changed his character's name from Conrad Logan (as it was originally written) to Logan McQueen as a nod to the "very complicated, very underrated" Steve McQueen.

Reynolds enjoyed directing the film.

== Home media ==
The film was released on DVD on August 3, 2004.

== Hard Time: The Premonition ==
Hard Time: The Premonition is a 1999 sequel to Hard Time. It was directed by David S. Cass Sr.

=== Plot ===
A serial bomber terrorizes the city.

=== Cast ===
- Burt Reynolds as Detective Logan McQueen
- Charles Durning as Detective Charlie Duffy
- Bruce Dern as Winston
- Gigi Rice as Janice
- Michael Buie as Higgs
- Roscoe Lee Browne as Sebastian
- Michael DeLuise as Dee
- Richard Riehle as Captain Waters
- Pepper Sweeney as Haflin
- Paul Bartel as Proprietor

== Hard Time: Hostage Hotel ==
Hard Time: Hostage Hotel is a 1999 American film. It is the third and last in the Hard Time series. It was also known as Hide and Seek. It was the last film to be directed by Hal Needham before his death in 2013.

=== Plot ===
Though they have not yet made up with each other, Detective Charlie Duffy convinces Detective Logan McQueen to help him catch fugitive Sy Harkin. The rescue goes wrong, ending in a gunfight and leaving Flynn and Duffy seeking another paying job.

As Congressman Robert Sinclair is giving a speech in the ballroom of an old hotel that is being renovated, his wife Susan and daughter Justine are taken hostage by Vietnam vets Corporal Arlin Flynn and Kenny, who blows up the ballroom and kills the audience, though Sinclair escapes. Flynn demands to negotiate through Duffy, who helped him out of jail in the past.

The FBI attempt to rescue Sinclair's family but are killed by various booby traps in the hotel. Duffy safely follows instructions from Flynn to the meeting point but is knocked out when Flynn discovers that he is wearing a wire. Logan arrives to see Susan's aide Ricki Stewart thrown to her death from a hotel window. Higgs obtains weapons and he and Logan infiltrate the hotel through a basement window, but are overheard by the FBI and the criminals as they are communicating with Captain Waters on a walkie-talkie channel.

Logan breaks into the room as Flynn is about to throw Justine out the window. Duffy shoots Kenny and Logan chases Flynn through the tunnels under the hotel, navigating a series of booby traps marked in Vietnamese. Logan offers to get Flynn help for his trauma from war but Flynn refuses and blows himself up, though Logan manages to dive and save himself and Justine.

=== Cast ===
- Burt Reynolds as Detective Logan McQueen
- Charles Durning as Detective Charlie Duffy
- Keith Carradine as Corporal Arlin Flynn
- Kevin Durand as Kenny
- Michael Buie as Higgs
- David Rasche as Robert Sinclair
- Ted McGinley as FBI Agent Hopkins
- Elizabeth Dennehy as Susan Sinclair
- Richard Riehle as Captain Waters
- Danielle Harris as Justine Sinclair
- Debra Christofferson as Ricki Stewart
