= Jack Wagner (actor) =

American actor & singer (born 1959)

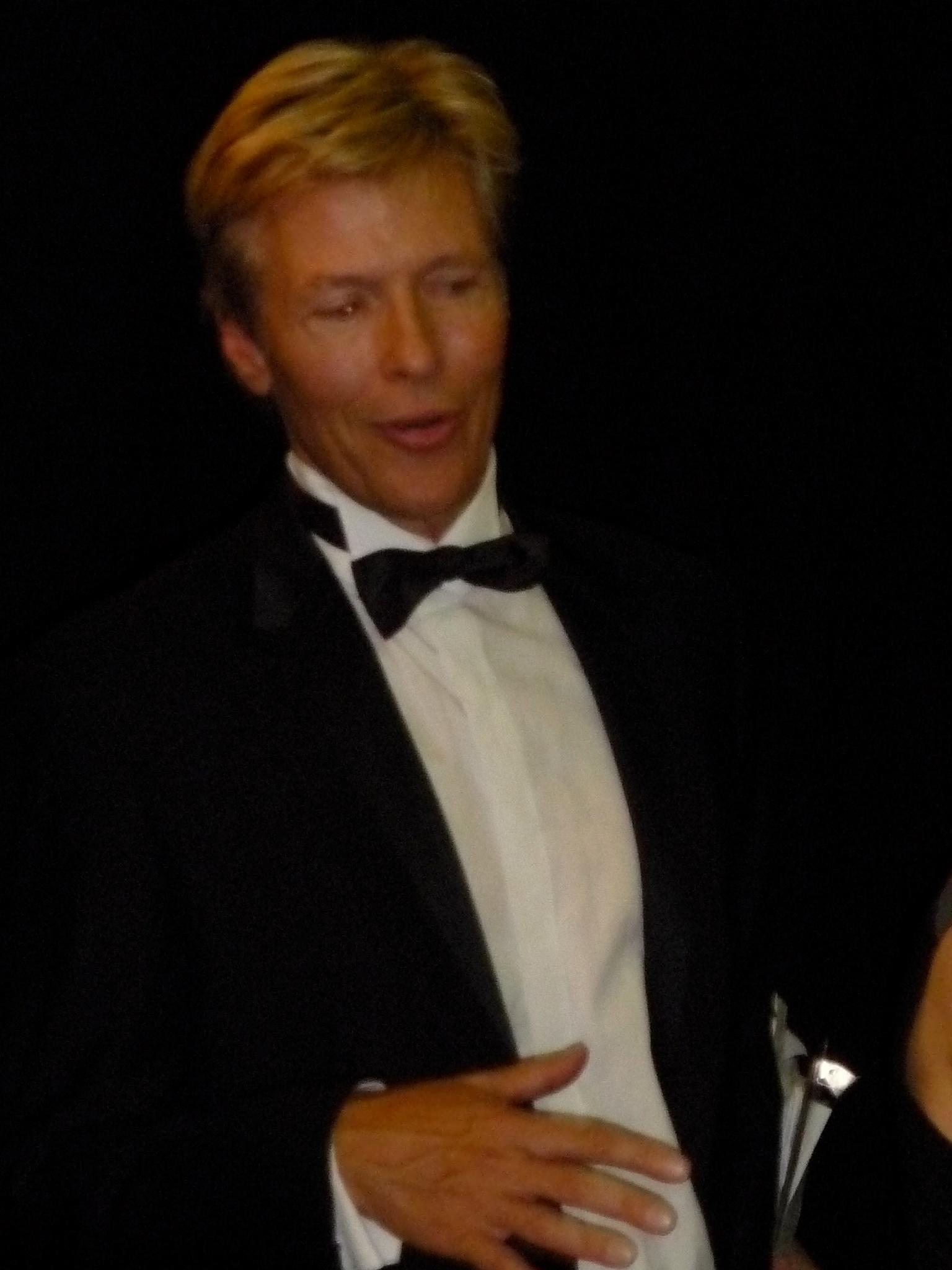
- Wagner at the 39th Daytime Emmy Awards, 2009
- Born: Peter John Wagner II; October 3, 1959 (age 67); Washington, Missouri, U.S.
- Occupations: Actor; singer; golfer
- Years active: 1982–present
- Spouses: Kristina Malandro (m. 1993; div. 2006) Michelle Wolf (m. 2025)
- Children: 3

Peter John Wagner II (born October 3, 1959) is an American actor, singer, and golfer. He is best known for his roles on soap operas such as General Hospital, Santa Barbara, The Bold and the Beautiful, and Melrose Place. His 1985 single "All I Need" peaked at number 2 on the Billboard Hot 100.

== Early life ==
Wagner was born in Washington, Missouri, to Peter John Wagner, a car salesman (died 1990), and Irene M. (née Amberg) "Scotty" Wagner (1920–2022), a homemaker. His only sibling, his elder brother Dennis Wagner (1953–2018), died of leukemia after a nearly two decade battle.

Raised Catholic, Wagner attended St. Gertrude's parochial school and St. Francis Borgia Regional High School in his hometown, where he played football and basketball. He attended the University of Missouri for one year, then junior college before eventually enrolling at the University of Arizona, where he tried out for the golf team and drama department. The drama department offered him a full scholarship.

== Acting and television career ==
Wagner first appeared on the scene in 1982 in the role of Clint Masterson, in Douglas Marland's short-lived cable soap opera, A New Day In Eden, co-produced by Susan Flannery, who would later co-star with Wagner on The Bold and the Beautiful.

His most famous role has been Frisco Jones on the soap opera General Hospital (1983–1987, 1989–1991, 1994–95, 2013). He was half of a supercouple (with real-life wife Kristina Wagner's character, Felicia) and played the father of Georgie and Maxie Jones. He played Warren Lockridge on Santa Barbara from 1991 until that series' conclusion in 1993.

He appeared in several made for television films, including Lady Killer and Frequent Flyer. He appeared for many years on Aaron Spelling's Fox nighttime soap opera Melrose Place, as the alternately caring/conniving Dr. Peter Burns (1994–99); he directed episodes as well. His character and Heather Locklear's "Amanda" were featured together on a beach in the series finale's closing scene, having faked their own deaths. He appeared in another Aaron Spelling project, the short-lived NBC television series Titans with Yasmine Bleeth in 2000, and in Spelling's daytime soap opera Sunset Beach (in 1997).

From 2003 to 2012, he played Nick Marone on the CBS daytime soap The Bold and the Beautiful. He reprised this role on June 16, 2025. On February 28, 2006, he and a contestant Christine Denos won $142,550 (including the standard $100,000 top prize) in the game show Wheel of Fortune; at the time, it set a single-episode largest winning record (and second largest overall) until Michelle Lowenstein surpassed said record on October 14, 2008, as the inaugural $1,000,000 winner.

In 1985, Wagner was nominated for a Daytime Emmy Award for "Best Younger Actor" for his work on General Hospital. He was nominated again in 2005 for "Best Lead Actor" for The Bold and the Beautiful.

Wagner guest-starred on primetime television in notable programs such as Monk, Hot in Cleveland, and Castle.

In January 2013, it was announced that Wagner had agreed to reprise the role of Frisco Jones on General Hospital for several episodes in early 2013. Since 2014, he has played Bill Avery on When Calls the Heart. Wagner also starred on the Hallmark Channel in the Wedding March film series, with The Wedding March 3: Here Comes the Bride having premiered in February 2018 and Falling for Christmas in 2022.

In 2026, Wagner competed in season fourteen of The Masked Singer as "Eggplant". He was eliminated on "Ozzfest Night".

== Dancing with the Stars ==
In 2012, Wagner was a contestant on season 14 of Dancing with the Stars, partnered with professional dancer Anna Trebunskaya. They were eliminated from the competition on April 3, 2012, placing 11th.

== Singing and stage career ==
=== Discography ===
==== Studio albums ====
Title	Details	Peak chart positions
Title	Details	US
All I Need	Released: October 1984; Label: Qwest; Format: LP, CD	44
Lighting Up the Night	Released: 1985; Label: Qwest; Format: LP, CD	150
Don't Give Up Your Day Job	Released: 1987; Label: Qwest; Format: LP, CD	151
Alone in a Crowd	Released: 1993; Label: BFE Format: LP, CD	—
Dancing in the Moonlight	Released: 2005; Label: BB&J; Format: LP, CD	—
On the Porch	Released: April 22, 2014; Label: Self-released; Format: Digital download, streaming	—

==== Singles ====
Year	Single	Chart Position					Album
Year	Single	US	US AC	CAN	CAN AC	AUS	Album
1984	"All I Need"	2	1	3	1	93	All I Need
1985	"Premonition" (also B-side of "Lady of My Heart")	101	—	—	—	—	All I Need
1985	"Lady of My Heart"	76	34	—	—	—	All I Need
1985	"Too Young"	52	15	—	4	—	Lighting Up the Night
1986	"Love Can Take Us All the Way" (with Valerie Carter)	—	—	—	—	—	Lighting Up the Night
1987	"Weatherman Says"	67	—	—	—	—	Don't Give Up Your Day Job
1993	"It's My Baby Too"	—	—	—	—	—	Alone in a Crowd
2012	"Will the Rain Fall Down"	—	—	—	—	—	Non-album single

Although Wagner had been playing the guitar since he was 14, his initial audition for the role of Frisco Jones on General Hospital with producer Gloria Monty did not include any singing. Wagner had five auditions with ABC before ultimately winning the role of "Frisco Jones". His final audition in 1983 included performing the Kenny Loggins song "Wait a Little While".

ABC musical honcho Kelli Ross hooked Wagner up with Quincy Jones who oversaw his initial 5 song EP All I Need. Eventually, they would release a full ten song LP of All I Need once the song "All I Need" began to rise up the charts. Quincy Jones protégés Glen Ballard and Clif Magness produced Wagner's first two albums on Qwest Records/Warner Brothers. Wagner's singing talents led him to appearances on American Bandstand, Solid Gold, Soul Train and The Merv Griffin Show.

Eventually, his musical theater talent led to the title role(s) in a Broadway run of Jekyll & Hyde, making him the first celebrity casting. Wagner has stated this was "a role of a lifetime" and performing the dual characters on Broadway was his most fulfilling professional experience. Wagner says "the role I had the most fun playing, TV-wise, would be Dr. Peter Burns (Melrose Place). He was sort of an evil character who could redeem himself. Theatrically, it was when I played Dr. Jekyll and Mr. Hyde in Jekyll & Hyde on Broadway." He also appeared in a national theatre tour in 1987 in the role of Tony in West Side Story, and a national tour of Grease in 1988.

In 2012, Wagner released new music, the single "Will the Rain Fall Down" on iTunes. He also performed the song acoustically on The Bold and the Beautiful. In 2014, Wagner released the full-length release On the Porch.

== Filmography ==
=== Film ===
Year	Title	Role	Notes
1990	Play Murder for Me	Paul Slater	
2000	Artificial Lies	Dr. Peter Rexler	
2003	Cupid's Prey	Jeremy Wetherton	
2022	Falling for Christmas	Beauregard Belmont	

=== Television ===
Year	Title	Role	Notes
1982	A New Day in Eden	Clint Masterson	Episode 1.1
1984–1991; 1994–1995; 2013	General Hospital	Frisco Jones	
1988	Moving Target	Tim Sutcliff - Scott Syndicate	TV movie
1989	Swimsuit	Hart Chadway	TV movie
1991–1993	Santa Barbara	Warren Lockridge	Main cast; 64 episodes
1994–1999	Melrose Place	Dr. Peter Burns	Main cast; 139 episodes
1995	Sirens	Jack	Episode: "Missing"
1995	Lady Killer	Dr. Elliman	TV movie
1996	Frequent Flyer	Nick Rawlings	TV movie
1997	Sabrina The Teenage Witch	Himself	Episode: Jennie's Non-Dream
1997	Echo	Max Jordan / Steven Jordan	TV movie
1997	Lois & Clark: The New Adventures of Superman	Randy Goode	Episode: "Sex, Lies and Videotape"
1997	Sunset Beach	Jacques Dumont / Liam	3 Episodes
1998	Dirty Little Secret	Jack Ramer	TV movie
1998	Miss Universe 1998	Himself	Anchor
1999	Miss Universe 1999	Himself	Anchor
2000	Nowhere to Land	Captain John Prescott	TV movie
2000–2001	Titans	Jack Williams	9 episodes
2002	Trapped: Buried Alive	Michael Cooper	TV movie
2003	Ghost Dog: A Detective Tail	Kyle Caldwell	TV movie
2003–2012, 2022, 2025	The Bold and the Beautiful	Nick Marone	Main cast (2003–2012); Recurring (2022, 2025)
2009	Monk	Perry Walsh	Episode: "Mr. Monk and Sharona"
2011–2013	Hot in Cleveland	Dr. Aaron Everett	2 episodes
2012	Dancing with the Stars	Himself	Partnered with Anna Trebunskaya; placed 11th
2013	Castle	Billy Piper	Episode: "Significant Others"
2013	See Dad Run	Scooter Sullivan	Episode: "See Dad Swoon"
2014	My Gal Sunday	Danny O'Brien	Hallmark Movies & Mysteries TV Movie
2014–present	When Calls the Heart	Bill Avery	Main cast; 117 episodes
2015	Ray Donovan	Sandy Patrick	Episode: "Breakfast of Champions"
2016	The Wedding March	Mick Turner	Hallmark Channel TV Movie; also executive producer
2017	Love on the Vines	Grant Gerritson	TV movie
2017	The Wedding March 2: Resorting to Love	Mick Turner	Hallmark Channel TV Movie; also executive producer
2018	The Wedding March 3: Here Comes the Bride	Mick Turner	Hallmark Channel TV Movie; also executive producer
2018	The Wedding March 4: Something Old, Something New	Mick Turner	Hallmark Channel TV Movie; also executive producer
2019	The Wedding March 5: My Boyfriend's Back	Mick Turner	Hallmark Channel TV Movie; also executive producer
2021	The Wedding March 6: Sealed With a Kiss	Mick Turner	Hallmark Channel TV Movie; also executive producer
2026	The Masked Singer	Himself/Eggplant	Season 14 contestant; 3 episodes

== Personal life ==
Wagner was married to actress Kristina Wagner, who played opposite him on General Hospital as his love interest Felicia Cummings. They divorced in 2006. They had two sons, born in 1990 and 1994. Their younger son Harrison died in Los Angeles on June 6, 2022, of an accidental drug overdose.

On June 13, 2022, Jack and his former wife announced a scholarship fund in honour of their son, who struggled with addiction issues. All funds donated to the Harrison Wagner Scholarship Fund will be used to directly help young men pay their rent or a portion of their rent who could not otherwise afford their care at New Life House (a sober living facility in California).

Wagner began dating his Melrose Place love interest Heather Locklear in 2007; they became engaged in August 2011. The couple called off their engagement on November 15, 2011.

In May 2013, Wagner confirmed to Soaps In Depth that he and his former The Bold and the Beautiful co-star Ashley Jones had been dating for about a year. They were no longer together as of 2015.

On May 18, 2025 Wagner married his girlfriend of almost 5 years, singer and songwriter Michelle Wolf, in an intimate ceremony at the Bel Air Country Club.

In November 2011, Jack met his 23-year-old daughter, Kerry, for the first time at a concert in Florida. Kerry had been placed for adoption at birth by her birth mother and had recently hired a private investigator to find her biological parents. This was the subject of Wagner's "personal story" in his Dancing with the Stars performance on April 2, 2012.

Wagner is a golfer, and at one point considered a career in pro golf. He won the Missouri junior college championship in 1980, and is the only non-professional athlete to have won the American Century Celebrity Golf Classic. Wagner first won the event in 2006 and repeated as champion in 2011, when he bested Dallas Cowboys quarterback Tony Romo. He has a total of nineteen top ten finishes. The tournament, televised by NBC in July, is played over three rounds at Edgewood Tahoe Golf Course in Lake Tahoe.

Wagner has a Celebrity Golf Classic named after him that raises funds for the Leukemia & Lymphoma Society. Wagner created the event to support the Society's mission to cure such cancers as leukemia, lymphoma, Hodgkin's disease, and myeloma, and to improve the quality of life of patients and their families. The Golf Classic raised more than $600,000 in its first two years to fund critical cancer research and patient services.
