= Goodnight, Beantown =

- Opening title
- Genre: Sitcom
- Created by: AJ Carothers
- Written by: AJ Carothers; Elias Davis; Bill Greer; Kathy Greer; Steve Kline; Ron Osborn; David Pollock; Jeff W. Reno
- Directed by: Alan Bergmann; Peter Baldwin; Bill Bixby; Kim Friedman; David Nelson; Will Mackenzie; Dick Martin; Bob Sweeney; Harry Winer
- Starring: Bill Bixby; Mariette Hartley; Tracey Gold
- Composer: Dennis McCarthy
- Country of origin: United States
- Original language: English
- No. of seasons: 2
- No. of episodes: 18

Production
- Executive producers: Bill Bixby; Paul Treva Brandon; AJ Carothers
- Producers: Elias Davis; Charles B. Fitzsimons; Bill Greer; Kathy Greer; David Pollock
- Cinematography: Richard C. Glouner
- Running time: 30 mins.
- Production companies: Bixby-Brandon Productions; Warner Bros. Television

Original release
- Network: CBS
- Release: April 3, 1983 – January 15, 1984

Goodnight, Beantown is an American sitcom that aired on CBS for two brief seasons in 1983 and 1984.

== Synopsis ==
The series cast

The series stars Bill Bixby as Matt Cassidy, and Mariette Hartley as Jennifer Barnes: two news anchors at WYN-TV, a fictional television station in Boston, Massachusetts. Matt is the station's evening news anchor and a longtime fixture at the station. However, when Matt's ratings begin to slide, the station management pairs the reluctant anchor with female co-anchor Jennifer.

The series follows their rocky relationship as they are not only coworkers but neighbors in the same building. Although slightly antagonistic at work, they are attracted to each other.

The series title comes from Matt's signoff at the end of the nightly newscasts, as "Beantown" is a common nickname for Boston (despite locals' disdain for the appellation).

Co-stars included Tracey Gold as the divorced Jennifer's daughter Susan and George Coe as station manager Dick Novak. Over the two seasons, Charles Levin, G. W. Bailey, Jim Staahl, Stephanie Faracy and Todd Susman played their co-workers at WYN.

Bixby and Hartley had previously worked together on an episode of The Incredible Hulk, and at the time of making Goodnight, Beantown, Hartley was appearing in a series of television commercials for Polaroid cameras with James Garner.

The series first aired Sundays at 8:00 p.m. in the spring of 1983 for a limited run of five episodes. When it returned in the fall, it aired Sundays at 9:30 p.m. for 13 more episodes before being canceled because of its middling ratings.

== Cast ==
- Bill Bixby as Matt Cassidy
- Mariette Hartley as Jennifer Barnes
- George Coe as Dick Novak (season 1)
- Tracey Gold as Susan Barnes
- G. W. Bailey as Albert Addelson (season 2)
- Stephanie Faracy as Valerie Wood
- Charles Levin as Sam Holliday
- Jim Staahl as Frank Fletcher
- Todd Susman as Augie Kleindab

== U.S. television ratings ==
Season	Episodes	Start date	End date	Nielsen rank	Nielsen rating
1982–83	5	April 3, 1983	May 1, 1983	21	18.6 (Note: Tied with Knots Landing)
1983–84	13	October 2, 1983	January 15, 1984	34	16.6 (Note: Tied with Cheers)

== Episodes ==
=== Season 1 (1983) ===
No. overall	No. in season	Title	Directed by	Written by	Original release date
1	1	"Pilot"	Harry Winer	AJ Carothers	April 3, 1983
2	2	"The-Out-of-Towner"	Harry Winer	Elias Davis & David Pollock	April 10, 1983
3	3	"The Source"	Harry Winer	Steve Kline	April 17, 1983
4	4	"Custody"	Peter Baldwin	AJ Carothers	April 24, 1983
5	5	"Please Stand By"	Peter Baldwin	Steve Kline	May 1, 1983

=== Season 2 (1983–84) ===
No. overall	No. in season	Title	Directed by	Written by	Original release date
6	1	"Hooking for Mr. Goodbar"	Bill Bixby	Bill Greer & Kathy Greer	October 2, 1983
7	2	"What's Good for the Goose"	Harry Winer	Ron Osborn & Jeff Reno	October 9, 1983
8	3	"A Felon Needs a Girl"	Bill Bixby	Kathy Greer & Bill Greer	October 16, 1983
9	4	"Invasions of Privacy"	Alan Bergmann	AJ Carothers	October 23, 1983
10	5	"Popsicle"	Dick Martin	Bill Greer & Kathy Greer	October 30, 1983
11	6	"Our Man in the Slammer"	Will Mackenzie	Bill Greer & Kathy Greer	November 6, 1983
12	7	"Looking Forward to the Past"	Kim Friedman	Ron Osborn & Jeff Reno	November 20, 1983
13	8	"Valerie's Fan"	Bob Sweeney	Ron Osborn & Jeff Reno	December 4, 1983
14	9	"Happy Medium"	Kim Friedman	Ron Osborn & Jeff Reno	December 11, 1983
15	10	"Peace on Earth"	Bill Bixby	Steve Kline & Ron Osborn & Jeff Reno	December 25, 1983
16	11	"The Consumer's Best Friend"	David Nelson	Gibson Carothers	January 1, 1984
17	12	"Lost and Foundering"	Bob Sweeney	Bill Greer & Kathy Greer	January 8, 1984
18	13	"An Old Flame Flickers"	Harry Winer	A.J. Carothers	January 15, 1984

== Awards and nominations ==
Year	Award	Result	Category	Recipient
1983	Emmy Award	Nominated	Outstanding Lead Actress in a Comedy Series	Mariette Hartley
1984	Young Artist Award	Winner	Best Young Actress in a New Television Series	Tracey Gold
1984	Young Artist Award	Winner	Best New Television Series	-
