= Face of Evil =

1996 American television film

- Genre: Thriller
- Written by: Gregory Goodell
- Directed by: Mary Lambert
- Starring: Tracey Gold; Perry King; Shawnee Smith
- Theme music composer: Chris Boardman
- Country of origin: United States
- Original language: English

Production
- Executive producer: Larry A. Thompson
- Producers: Robert Kosberg; Arvin Kaufman
- Production location: Salt Lake City
- Cinematography: Brian Capener
- Editor: Sharyn L. Ross
- Running time: 87 minutes

Original release
- Network: CBS
- Release: April 9, 1996

Face of Evil is a 1996 American thriller television film starring Tracey Gold as Darcy Palmer, Perry King as Russell Polk and Shawnee Smith as his daughter Jeanelle Polk. It aired on CBS on April 9, 1996.

== Plot ==
Darcy Palmer (Gold) is a promising young artist. On the night before her wedding, she empties her fiancé's bank account and runs to New York. On the way, she meets Brianne Dwyer (Mireille Enos), a young woman who is on her way to her first year in college. Darcy murders Brianne and assumes her identity, enrolling in college in Brianne's place.
