= All I Need (Jack Wagner album) =

Studio album by Jack Wagner
- Released: October 1984
- Studios: Wilder Bros. Studios (Los Angeles, California); Weddington Studios (North Hollywood, California)
- Genres: Pop rock; soft rock
- Length: 34:17
- Label: Qwest
- Producers: Glen Ballard; Clif Magness

Jack Wagner chronology
All I Need (1984)	Lighting Up the Night (1985)

All I Need is the debut studio album from General Hospital star Jack Wagner. Quincy Jones protégé Glen Ballard (who would go on to write with and produce Wilson Phillips six years later, and have massive success in the 1990s with Alanis Morissette's Jagged Little Pill) and Clif Magness (who also worked in a musical context with Ballard on Wilson Phillips' debut album) oversaw the project, co-writing some of the material as well as playing some instruments. Despite an ability to play guitar, and despite playing in several live shoots for the title track, Wagner himself only sang on the disc.

The album featured a huge hit in the title track, which climbed all the way to number two and stayed there for two weeks; it was also a number one AC hit for two weeks. Rare for the time it was released, "All I Need" was notable in that the song was able to climb the charts while not having the assistance of an accompanying music video. For the album's second single, "Premonition", a music video was made and it debuted on NBC's Friday Night Videos in January, 1985. A third and final single, "Lady of My Heart", was released in the spring of 1985 and reached #76 on the Billboard Hot 100. "Lady of My Heart" is notable for being used on General Hospital as the love theme of Wagner's character Frisco and Felicia (played by Kristina Malandro).

== Critical reception ==
Professional ratings
Review scores
Source	Rating
Allmusic	4.5/5 stars

Within a 4.5/5 star review Allmusic proclaimed, "While the production is as dated as one would expect, the songs themselves still sound viable and fresh."

== Track listing ==
1. "Premonition" (Tom Keane, Clif Magness, Mark Mueller) – 3:15
2. "What You Don't Know" (Mueller, Mark Bryant) – 3:32
3. "Whenever Hearts Collide" (Matthew Garey, Ellen Schwartz, Roger Bruno) – 3:39
4. "Fighting the Nights" (Magness, Glen Ballard) – 3:06
5. "All I Need" (Magness, Ballard, David Pack) – 3:29
6. "Make Me Believe It" (Magness, Mueller) – 3:01
7. "Sneak Attack" (Roy Freeland, Peter Leinheiser, Hummie Mann) – 3:15
8. "After the Fact" (Jerome Stocco) – 4:05
9. "Tell Him (That You Won't Go)" (Magness, Schwartz, Bruno) – 2:43
10. "Lady of My Heart" (Ballard, David Foster, Jay Graydon) – 4:02

Note: The original release of the album was as an EP, containing the tracks "Make Me Believe It", "Premonition", "All I Need", "Tell Him That You Won't Go", and "Sneak Attack." After the EP's initial success, five additional tracks were added and it was released as an LP.

== Production ==
- Glen Ballard – producer, arrangements
- Clif Magness – producer, arrangements
- Francis Buckley – recording, mixing
- Ian Eales – recording, mixing
- Ray Blair – assistant engineer
- Steve Hall – mastering at Future Disc (Hollywood, California)
- Laura LiPuma – art direction
- Penny Wolin – photography

== Personnel ==
=== Musicians ===
- Jack Wagner – vocals
- Tom Keane – synthesizers (1)
- John Van Tongeren – synthesizers (1, 6, 7, 9), keyboards (2, 8)
- Sam Bryant – keyboards (2)
- Mark Vieha – keyboards (4)
- Clif Magness – guitars (2–9)
- Michael Thompson – lead guitar (2)
- Davey Faragher – bass (2–8, 10)
- Bill Elliott – drums (1, 5–7, 9), keyboards (3, 10), acoustic piano (5), synthesizers (5)
- Pat Mastelotto – drums (2–4, 8, 10)
- Jerry Peterson – saxophone solo (10)

=== Background vocals ===
- Clif Magness – backing vocals (1, 4–7, 9)
- Siedah Garrett – backing vocals (2)
- Edie Lehmann – backing vocals (2, 4)
- Rosemary Butler – backing vocals (5–7)
- Debbie Pearl – backing vocals (5)
