= All I Need (Jack Wagner song) =

1984 single by Jack Wagner

Single by Jack Wagner

from the album All I Need
- B-side: "Tell Him (That You Won't Go)"
- Released: October 1984
- Recorded: 1984
- Genre: Pop rock
- Length: 3:29
- Label: Qwest
- Songwriters: Glen Ballard; Clif Magness; David Pack
- Producers: Glen Ballard; Clif Magness

Jack Wagner singles chronology
"All I Need" (1984)	"Lady of My Heart" (1985)

"All I Need" is a song by American actor and singer Jack Wagner. The song was released in 1984 from his debut album with the same name.

Wagner became known for his role as Frisco Jones on the soap opera General Hospital prior to recording the song; he has since had roles on other television programs, such as The Bold and the Beautiful and Melrose Place. "All I Need" was written by Glen Ballard, David Pack and Clif Magness and produced by Ballard and Magness.

The song proved to be Wagner's only Top 40 hit, peaking at number two on the Billboard Hot 100 chart in early 1985, remaining there for two weeks, behind Madonna's "Like a Virgin". In Canada, "All I Need" reached number three. The single also spent two weeks atop Billboard's adult contemporary chart, as well as the Canadian AC chart.

== Personnel ==
- Jack Wagner – vocals
- Bill Elliott – synthesizers, acoustic piano, drums
- Clif Magness – guitars, backing vocals
- Davey Faragher – bass
- Rosemary Butler – backing vocals
- Debbie Pearl – backing vocals

== Chart history ==
=== Weekly charts ===
Chart (1984–1985)	Peak position
Australia (Kent Music Report)	93
Canada RPM Adult Contemporary	1
Canada RPM Top Singles	3
US Billboard Hot 100	2
US Billboard Adult Contemporary	1
US Cash Box Top 100	2

=== Year-end charts ===
Chart (1985)	Rank
Canada	39
US Top Pop Singles (Billboard)	42
US (Joel Whitburn's Pop Annual)	31
US Cash Box	37

== Cover versions ==
- In 2007, the song was covered by Filipino rock band Shamrock for the Filipino romantic comedy movie My Best Friend's Girlfriend.
- In 2009, VH1 ranked "All I Need" No. 71 on its program 100 Greatest One-Hit Wonders of the 80s.

== See also ==
- List of number-one adult contemporary singles of 1985 (U.S.)
