= Something Is Expected =

Studio album by Theresa Sokyrka
- Released: September 5, 2006
- Genre: Folk; indie pop
- Length: 42:27
- Label: Maple Music
- Producer: Theresa Sokyrka (exec.); David Carswell; John Collins; Michael Timmins

Theresa Sokyrka chronology
These Old Charms (2005)	Something Is Expected (2006)	Wrapped in Ribbon (2007)

Professional ratings
Review scores
Source	Rating
AllMusic	3.5/5 stars
Tiny Mix Tapes	link

Something Is Expected is Theresa Sokyrka's second album, released on August 29, 2006, by Maple Music.

== Album information ==
Except for "Bluebird", the album contains all original songs. Michael Timmins of the Cowboy Junkies and The New Pornographers members John Collins and David Carswell split the album's production duties. Dave Thompson, guitarist/producer for High Holy Days and Leslie Carter mixed "Yours Is Yours".

== Singles ==
The first single from the album was "Waiting Song", released in Canada. A music video was made, and can be seen on MuchMoreMusic. Sokyrka travelled to Peru to create her second video for the second single, "Sandy Eyes", which also aired on MuchMoreMusic.

== Track listing ==
All tracks are written by Theresa Sokyrka, except where noted

No.	Title	Writer(s)	Producer(s)	Length
1.	"Waiting Song"		John Collins; David Carswell	3:15
2.	"Believe Me"		Michael Timmins	3:35
3.	"Tell Me Why"		Timmins	3:45
4.	"Enemy"		Collins; Carswell	3:00
5.	"Falling Out"		Collins; Carswell	3:28
6.	"Something Is Expected"		Collins; Carswell	4:18
7.	"Yours Is Yours"		Collins; Carswell	3:46
8.	"River Bend"		Timmins	2:55
9.	"Sandy Eyes"		Collins; Carswell	2:25
10.	"Without Waking"		Collins; Carswell	4:36
11.	"Here I Am"		Collins; Carswell	4:02
12.	"Bluebird"	Bryce Janssens	Timmins	3:22

== Personnel ==
Adapted from the liner notes of Something Is Expected.

Performers and musicians

- Justin Abedin – electric guitar
- Rob Becker – bass guitar
- Richard Bell – Hammond B3, Wurlitzer
- Jeff Bird – bass guitar
- Pete Bourne – drums
- David Carswell – electric guitar
- Rob Chursinoff – drums
- John Collins – acoustic guitar, bass guitar, electric guitar, omnichord, tambourine
- Randall Coryell – drums
- Jaro Czerwinec – accordion
- Peter Elkas – electric guitar
- Ryan Marchant – electric guitar
- Curtis Phagoo – bass guitar
- Tyler Reimer – drums, shaker, xylophone
- Rod Salloum – Hammond B3, melodica, Nord organ, piano
- Harold Sokyrka (Theresa's father) – accordion
- Theresa Sokyrka – acoustic guitar, vocals
- Michael Timmins – acoustic guitar

Production

- Joe Dunphy – mixing
- George Graves – mastering
- Howard Redekopp – mixing
- Jeff Wolpert – mixing

Photography

- Dustin Rabin – cover photo
- Allison Woo – album design, tray photo
- Brock French – photo editing
