= Pinocchio (2022 live-action film soundtrack) =

Pinocchio (Original Soundtrack)

Soundtrack album by Alan Silvestri
- Released: September 8, 2022
- Recorded: 2021–2022
- Studio: Abbey Road Studios, London
- Genre: Film soundtrack
- Length: 67:22
- Label: Walt Disney
- Producer: Alan Silvestri; Glen Ballard

Alan Silvestri chronology
The Witches (2020)	Pinocchio (2022)

Pinocchio (Original Soundtrack) is the soundtrack to the 2022 Disney film Pinocchio, a live-action remake of Walt Disney's 1940 animated film of the same name, which is itself based on the 1883 Italian book The Adventures of Pinocchio by Carlo Collodi, the film is directed by Robert Zemeckis, and starred Tom Hanks, Cynthia Erivo and Luke Evans with Benjamin Evan Ainsworth (as the title character), Joseph Gordon-Levitt, Keegan-Michael Key and Lorraine Bracco in voice roles. The musical score was composed by Alan Silvestri, who regularly collaborated in all of Zemeckis' films, and was recorded at the Abbey Road Studios, London. Besides producing the score, Silvestri also wrote new songs for the film, with songwriter-producer Glen Ballard, while the songs from the original counterpart were also featured in the album. Walt Disney Records released the soundtrack album on September 8, 2022.

== Background ==
In December 2020, regular Zemeckis collaborator Alan Silvestri was announced to score for the film. He also wrote the original songs for the film, with songwriter Glen Ballard. Both Ballard and Silvestri, had connected with the original 1940 film as viewers, and being a classic film in the Disney era, they were skeptic on treating the modern adaptation's music, but had faith on Zemeckis' vision and motivation. Ballard had also opined that "The whole Disney model is you use songs to help to tell the story. We had a great director who wanted songs to help to tell the story. It wasn't really a musical, but a lot of the movies that Disney has made over the years are not really musicals. They are kind of musicals, but they're not really musicals. So, I feel like that's what “Pinocchio” is."

== Release ==
On May 31, 2022, the film's teaser which was released, featured part of Cynthia Erivo (as the Blue Fairy) performing her rendition of "When You Wish Upon a Star". On August 31, the official song titles were revealed with four original songs: "When He Was Here with Me" and "Pinocchio, Pinocchio" by Tom Hanks (as Geppetto), "I Will Always Dance" by Kyanne Lamaya (as Fabiana) and "The Coachman to Pleasure Island" by Luke Evans (as the Coachman). Two songs from the 1940 film – "Hi-Diddle-Dee-Dee (An Actor's Life for Me)" by Keegan-Michael Key (as Honest John) and "I've Got No Strings" by Benjamin Evan Ainsworth (as Pinocchio) – were also included. However, four tracks from the original: "Little Wooden Head", "Give a Little Whistle," and the reprises of "Hi-Diddle-Dee-Dee" and "When You Wish Upon a Star" were not featured in the film.

The soundtrack was officially announced by Walt Disney Records on September 6, 2022, and released on the same date as the film. Apart from the songs, it also contained Silvestri's score occupying the remainder of the album. The album was dubbed and released in 17 languages: Spanish (Castilian), Spanish (Neutral), Italian, Portuguese, Vietnamese, Mandarin Chinese, Taiwanese, Korean, Japanese, Russian, Polish, Dutch, Norwegian, German, Malay, Indonesian, Thai and Hindi.

== Track listing ==
All music is composed by Alan Silvestri.

No.	Title	Writer(s)	Artist(s)	Length
1.	"When You Wish Upon a Star"	Leigh Harline; Ned Washington	Cynthia Erivo	1:57
2.	"Jiminy Cricket's the Name"			1:26
3.	"When He Was Here with Me"	Glen Ballard; Alan Silvestri	Tom Hanks	3:25
4.	"You Should Have a Name of Your Own"			1:51
5.	"Pinocchio, Pinocchio"	Ballard; Silvestri	Hanks	1:10
6.	"He's Alive"			3:01
7.	"Am I Real"			2:53
8.	"I Can Talk and So Can You"			2:02
9.	"Off to School"			1:21
10.	"Famous!"			3:09
11.	"Hi-Diddle-Dee-Dee (An Actor's Life for Me)"	Harline; Washington	Keegan-Michael Key	1:08
12.	"Get Me Outta' Here"			3:11
13.	"I've Got No Strings"	Harline; Washington	Benjamin Evan Ainsworth	1:39
14.	"Sabina's Waltz"			0:30
15.	"I Will Always Dance"	Ballard; Silvestri	Kyanne Lamaya	1:53
16.	"This Will Be Your Home"			5:09
17.	"A Lie Can Really Change a Person"			3:13
18.	"The Collection"			2:28
19.	"The Coachman to Pleasure Island"	Ballard; Silvestri	Luke Evans	1:32
20.	"Pleasure Island"			4:44
21.	"I Wonder Where Everybody Is"			1:38
22.	"Somebody Help Me"			3:04
23.	"He Sold His Clocks to Find Me"			2:09
24.	"I Have an Idea"			3:28
25.	"Monstro Attacks"			3:45
26.	"Here He Comes"			1:22
27.	"I Have to Help Him"			1:07
28.	"We're All Here"			3:39
29.	"Pinocchio Main Title"			1:14

== Reception ==
Irrespective of the film's negative reception, the music received some praise from critics. Jonathan Broxton wrote "the fact that this score is so clearly entrenched in Silvestri's personal style – almost to the point of predictability – may result in some listeners feeling a little let down by the inevitable sameness of it all. One final issue that may leave some listeners disappointed is the fact that Silvestri chose not to incorporate any of Leigh Harline's classic Pinocchio themes into his new score; the lack of any crossover between them leaves the song-score split a little disjointed, as if the songs are there merely for lip service and not an integral part of the whole idea" and concluded "It's too anonymous and self-conscious to become a beloved classic the way the 1940s original did, but Alan Silvestri's many admirers will still have fun in the moment." James Southall of Movie Wave wrote "The main title track that closes the album will get a place on most people's Silvestri playlists for sure, but I'm not sure the rest of the score will stick long in the memory. As good as some of the late action is, it doesn't really make up for the bulk of the album, which might feature a lot of the composer's trademarks but just doesn't gel the way his best work does." Filmtracks.com wrote "Pinocchio is a really superb Silvestri score that sounds fantastic, the composer pulling all the right heart strings for his fans. Unfortunately, he doesn't pull all of the right strings on Pinocchio himself, for the soundtrack as a whole isn't a great representation of the concept."

Variety's Andrew Barker wrote "Lyricist Glen Ballard and composer Alan Silvestri have composed several largely middling new songs, although most of the original's key tunes survive in some form." ACRN's Cody Englander had felt that "Composer Alan Silvestri uses the piano beautifully, although the visuals offer nothing of substance to accompany the song (which is cut short). Every other song feels like an afterthought, slathered in autotune and completely overproduced." Pete Simons of Synchrotones wrote "Alan Silvestri's Pinocchio narrates virtually every twist and turn of the story, presumably in an effort to propel the movie forward, but sadly it feels too fragmented on album, especially during the first half. The main theme, though charming, is not strong enough to hold everything together. However, there's no doubt about the craftsmanship on display here; production values are all top notch. When the music finally gets to soar, from track 21 onwards and filling the last twenty-something minutes on the album, it's a delight." Jack Bottomley of Starburst Magazine called it as a "lovely soundtrack". Christy Lemire of RogerEbert.com wrote "The score from veteran composer and longtime Zemeckis collaborator Alan Silvestri swells in all the expected, feel-good ways. It's all very familiar and cozy."
