= Lady Killer (1995 film) =

1995 film by Steven Schachter

- Genre: Thriller
- Written by: Michael L. Grace
- Directed by: Steven Schachter
- Starring: Judith Light; Jack Wagner; Tracey Gold
- Music by: Micky Erbe; Maribeth Solomon
- Country of origin: United States
- Original language: English

Production
- Executive producers: Donald Kushner; Peter Locke
- Producer: Janet Faust Krusi
- Production locations: Niagara Region, Ontario; Toronto
- Cinematography: Bryan England; Peter Luxford
- Editor: Bernadette Kelly
- Running time: 85 mins
- Production companies: The Kushner-Locke Company; Multicom Entertainment Group, Inc. (Distributor)

Original release
- Network: CBS
- Release: April 5, 1995

Lady Killer is a 1995 drama television film directed by Steven Schachter, and stars Judith Light as a married woman who breaks off an affair with a younger man (Jack Wagner), who doesn't react well and targets her daughter (Tracey Gold). The film aired on CBS on April 5, 1995.

== Plot ==
Janice Mitchell is a married woman who has a brief affair with attractive younger man Dr. Guy Ellisman. When she breaks off the affair, he doesn't react well, first by stalking and raping her. Janice and her husband decide to take an island vacation with their daughter Sharon, who brings along her boyfriend, who turns out to be Guy Ellisman. Janice soon finds herself at risk of telling her family about her affair.

In the end, everything comes to a head at a lighthouse, when Guy attempts to kill Ross by shooting him, then chases Janice up to the top of the lighthouse, trying to claim that Ross died in an accidental shooting and that they can finally be together, and tries to rape her again. Sharon, having discovered Guy's true nature, attempts to stop him by taking his gun and revealing to Janice that Guy shot Ross on purpose, causing Guy to attack her, throw the gun away, and violently push her down to the ground. Having now been exposed for attempting to kill Ross in front of Janice, Guy begs Janice to not hate him, only for Janice to angrily push him off the lighthouse tower, sending a screaming Guy falling to his death. Janice and Sharon then reach Ross, who is still alive, and the reunited family wait for medical officials to help, leaving Guy's corpse behind.

== Cast ==
- Judith Light as Janice Mitchell
- Jack Wagner as Dr. Guy Ellisman
- Ben Masters as Ross Mitchell
- Tracey Gold as Sharon Mitchell
- Diana Leblanc as Dr. Sachs
- Patricia Caroll Brown as Helen Oakes
- J.R. Zimmerman as George Oakes
- Wendy Hopkins as Sgt. Ryan
- Raymond O'Neill as Bob
- Sheila Brand as Wendy

== Critical reception ==
The website Cranky Lesbian praised Judith Light's performance, but said, "Rape as a sensationalized trope in TV movies has always made my skin crawl and the salacious way it's handled (and flashed back to) in Lady Killer is no exception."

== Home media ==
Lady Killer was released on DVD on June 17, 2003 through Live/Artisan Studio.
