= Frequent Flyer (film) =

- Written by: D. Victor Hawkins; Tom Nelson
- Directed by: Alan Metzger
- Starring: Jack Wagner; Shelley Hack; Nicole Eggert; Joan Severance
- Music by: Johnny Harris
- Country of origin: United States
- Original language: English

Production
- Cinematography: Billy Dickson
- Editor: Sidney Wolinsky

Original release
- Network: ABC
- Release: March 10, 1996

Frequent Flyer is a 1996 American made-for-TV movie starring Jack Wagner, Shelley Hack, Nicole Eggert, and Joan Severance about a commercial airline pilot and his attempt to be married to three women at the same time. The movie is based on the true story of commercial airline pilot (and later promoted to captain) John Charles Lutter (aka Jack Lutter, 1943 - ?), who married six women and fathered at least fifteen children.

== Plot ==
Wagner plays Nick Rawlings, a pilot for a major commercial airline who is based in Dallas, Texas with his wife Jo Beth, an antiques store owner, and their son Eric.

Nick is also married to Allison, a business executive from Chicago, and has been so for three years. Nick is also engaged to, and plans to marry, Miriam (Eggert), a young woman living with her father in Hawaii.

Nearing his and Jo Beth's 16th anniversary, Nick wanders into a jewelry store and purchases a silver picture frame for $349, and an engagement ring for $8,250. Jo finds the credit card receipt and is excited thinking the two gifts were for her anniversary. However, she is let down when she only gets the frame and further investigates with her business partner what the rest of the money was spent on. Upon finding out about the ring, she starts getting suspicious about Nick.

She proceeds to take the next flight he's on to find out what's going on. Upon arrival in Chicago, she sees him and Allison kiss passionately. Right there, she decides to hire a private investigator to find more out about them. He finds out that they are married. She also finds out that Allison is planning to relocate to Dallas and is in the process of buying a house...on the same street her house is on.

At the same time, Nick is in Hawaii tying the knot with Miriam. She then tags along with him back to Dallas to spend more time with him. Within that journey, he finds out what Jo Beth has been doing to him.

Jo Beth pretends that her purse was stolen in order to have the old credit cards, ATM cards, and their checking account turned off, and have new numbers issued. She also sells all of the stocks they held, and even sold their classic Ford Thunderbird. She even went so far as to draw up a contract turning over her entire business to her friend who works with her in order for Nick not to be able to get his hands on any of it in the divorce.

After Nick's son, Eric, gets a letter showing he was accepted to Dorsett, the prestigious prep school his father went to, he runs to the airport to meet his dad to tell him the good news. He sees his father romantically kissing Miriam, so he runs away to tell Jo Beth about it, and she goes to Allison's new house to confront her, thinking it was her. Allison tells Jo Beth it wasn't her, and Jo Beth asks to see her engagement ring. Allison shows it to her, and it is clearly different from the one she saw at the store. Realizing there are three wives and not two in the picture, a horrified Jo Beth collapses in agony; it is later revealed that she had a heart attack.

Nick gets home to Dallas after having two credit cards confiscated, and finding out his Thunderbird was gone, and wonders what is going on. He gets home to find out from his son that Jo Beth had a heart attack. At the same time, he sent Miriam off to his friend's apartment playing it off as his own. However, his friend finally gets sick of playing the game and tells Miriam the truth, so she goes to the hospital to confront Nick.

At the hospital Nick finds Allison and finds out Jo Beth refuses to let him into the room she's in. When Miriam arrives, she finds out the whole truth, then slaps Nick across his face, threatens him with her father, and leaves in a huff. Meanwhile, Allison simply says she's not going to relocate to Dallas and packs up back for Chicago, but not before giving Nick a final kiss, and telling him she always knew he was too good to be true.

Three months later after he and Jo Beth's divorce (the other two were officially null and void due to bigamy laws), he is on another flight pattern from the one he was on before, plus he sees Jo Beth send Eric off to Dorsett. He would explain to his friend why he tried to be married to all three girls. (He was always afraid he would lose one of them). After he departs from him, he ends up bumping into another girl and they seem to connect right away. What happens after that we don't know, however the epilogue says Jo Beth declined to press criminal charges on Nick and has not remarried, whereas Nick remarried, but it is not certain if it was only with one woman.

== Cast ==
- Jack Wagner as Nick Rawlings
- Shelley Hack as JoBeth Rawlings
- Kalen Mills as Eric
- Nicole Eggert as Miriam Rawlings
- Joan Severance as Allison Rawlings
- Mark Nutter as Mitch Burns
- Elizabeth Ruscio
