= Too Much Too Young =

Too Much Too Young can refer to:

- Too Much Too Young (EP), a 1980 EP by band The Specials/Special A.K.A. and its title track
- Too Much Too Young: The Gold Collection, a 1996 compilation release by The Specials
- "Too Much Too Young", 1992 single by the band Little Angels
