= 219 Days =

Studio album by Kalan Porter
- Released: November 23, 2004
- Recorded: September–November 2004
- Studio: Metalworks Studios in Mississauga, Ontario
- Genre: Pop rock
- Length: 45:12
- Label: Sony Music Canada
- Producer: Rob Wells, Perry Alexander, Chris Anderson, Luke McMaster, Tranny Wu, Derek Brin, Urin Isaacs

Kalan Porter chronology
219 Days (2004)	Wake Up Living (2007)

219 Days is the debut album of Canadian Idol winner Kalan Porter. The album was released on November 23, 2004, through Sony Music Canada. The album title refers to the number of days from his first audition to the release of his debut CD. The album debuted at #4 on the Canadian Albums Chart and was certified double platinum by the CRIA months later with an excess of 200,000 copies.

== Track listing ==
No.	Title	Length
1.	"Praeludium and Allegro"	0:44
2.	"She's So Dangerous"	3:20
3.	"I Don't Wanna Miss You"	4:06
4.	"Single"	2:40
5.	"In Spite of it All"	3:28
6.	"Awake in a Dream"	4:07
7.	"Lucky Day"	3:45
8.	"After All"	3:54
9.	"How Many Roads"	3:30
10.	"Unconditional"	3:25
11.	"Until You"	3:07
12.	"And We Drive" (with Randy Bachman)	3:09
13.	"My Sweet One"	2:21
14.	"True Colours" (with Theresa Sokyrka)	3:53

== Singles ==
- "Awake in a Dream"
- "Single"
- "In Spite of It All"
