= Tracey Gold =

American actress (born 1969)

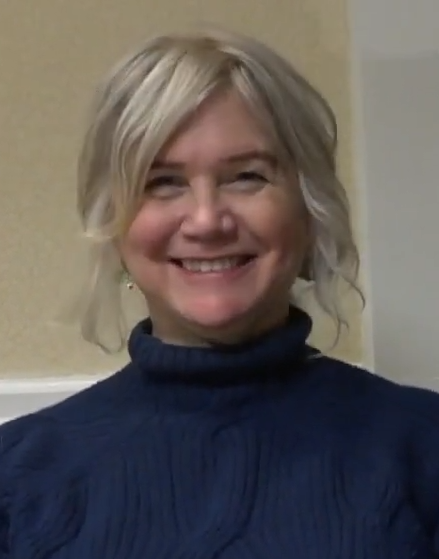
- Gold in 2024
- Born: May 16, 1969 (age 57)
- Occupation: Actress
- Years active: 1976–present
- Known for: Growing Pains; The Growing Pains Movie; Growing Pains: Return of the Seavers; Goodnight, Beantown; Shirley
- Spouse: Roby Marshall (m. 1994)
- Children: 4
- Relatives: Missy Gold (sister)

Tracey Gold (born May 16, 1969) is an American actress known for her role as Carol Seaver on the sitcom Growing Pains.

== Acting career ==
Gold became an actress at the age of four, first appearing in a Pepsi print ad. She appeared in two canceled series, Shirley with Shirley Jones in 1979, and Goodnight, Beantown, starring Bill Bixby in 1983. Gold was originally cast as the youngest daughter in the original pilot series of the sitcom Gimme a Break! starring Nell Carter, but was replaced by actress Lara Jill Miller when the show went to series. She played one of Albert Finney and Diane Keaton's four daughters in the feature film Shoot the Moon (1982).

In 1985, Gold auditioned for the role of Carol Seaver on Growing Pains, but was not initially cast. The actress chosen for the pilot was Elizabeth Ward, who had starred alongside Gold in The Hand-Me-Down Kid, a 1983 ABC Afterschool Special. However, test audiences did not favor Ward in the role of Carol, and she was replaced by Gold. Growing Pains ran from 1985 until 1992. During this time, Gold became a famous teen star and battled anorexia. She reprised her role in two TV movies: The Growing Pains Movie (2000) and Growing Pains: Return of the Seavers (2004). In 1988, Gold also starred as Angela Strull in the teen film Dance 'til Dawn.

On August 9, 1988, Gold and her two sisters were the only celebrities at the funeral of murdered child-actor Judith Barsi. Gold read A Child of Mine (from the poet Edgar A. Guest) as a eulogy.

After the end of Growing Pains, Gold continued to work as an actress. Over the next decade, she starred in several television movies, including For the Love of Nancy (1994), Lady Killer (1995), and Face of Evil (1996), among others. In 2003, Gold appeared in an episode of the TV show The Dead Zone as the character Penny Barton. Gold was a contestant on the program Celebrity Mole: Yucatán in 2004, and starred in the television movie Safe Harbor in 2006. She hosted the TV Guide Channel mini-show Trapped in TV Guide. In addition, she hosted the TLC series The Secret Life of a Soccer Mom, which debuted on March 3, 2008.

Gold appeared as the spokesperson in "Baby Sleeps Safe", a national television infomercial for Baby Guardian. On January 2, 2012, she appeared on the ABC network's reality series Celebrity Wife Swap, trading places with singer Carnie Wilson for a week. On July 24, 2013, Gold returned to sitcoms with an appearance on the Melissa & Joey episode, "Something Happened," as one half of a lesbian couple with a home-schooled daughter. Gold starred in the first episode of Heartbreakers called "Shot Through The Heart" on ID on August 13, 2014.

She competed on and won the twenty fourth season of Worst Cooks in America, the show's seventh celebrity edition titled That's So 90s, airing in April and May 2022.

== Battle with anorexia ==
Gold said around the age of seven, she thought about dieting, having learned the word and the concept on the many television production sets she worked on as a child actress. She became preoccupied with the television movie The Best Little Girl in the World, starring actress Jennifer Jason Leigh, about an anorexic teenager. In her autobiography, Gold says that in an attempt to control her development into a woman, she began restricting what she ate. At age 11, she was diagnosed with the early stages of anorexia nervosa by her family pediatrician after a weight loss that accompanied a growth spurt. After some counseling, she eventually returned to a more normal weight for most of her teenage years. In 1988, at age 19, Gold gained some weight over the Growing Pains series hiatus. That season, the sitcom's scripts called for her weight to frequently be the brunt of jokes from her television brothers.

Beginning in October 1988, Gold dieted from 133 pounds to about 110 pounds on a medically supervised 500-calorie-a-day (2,100 kJ) diet. However, the scripts continued to occasionally include weight-based jokes at her expense. In her autobiography, she says that between 1989 and 1991, she became increasingly obsessed with her weight and with food; she continued to slowly and steadily lose weight.

In 1990, Gold began group therapy in an eating disorder program, but only learned more ways to lose weight. That season, her problem with weight loss was briefly mentioned on Growing Pains, in a scene where Gold is seen looking at her body in a carnival mirror and describes to another character the distorted image in her head.

In 1991, her symptoms escalated, and she lost a large amount of weight; she was admitted to a hospital in early 1992. Her lowest weight is estimated to have been near 80 pounds. She was suspended from the show for her skeletal appearance. Photos of Gold were published in tabloid magazines, and she was formally outed as anorexic. She last appeared on Growing Pains in the 1991 episode "Menage a Luke," after missing the two prior episodes. She returned for the series finale in the late spring of 1992.

After several years' struggle, Gold eventually recovered, and starred in the television movie For the Love of Nancy (1994) with Jill Clayburgh. The film explored a young woman's battle with anorexia and its effects on her family.

As she entered her thirties, Gold maintained a normal weight for her body structure; she now often holds speaking engagements warning young women about the dangers of eating disorders.

== Personal life ==
Gold and Roby Marshall married on October 8, 1994, and have four sons, Sage Gold, Bailey Vincent, Aiden Michael, and Dylan Christopher.

In 2003, Gold wrote the book Room to Grow: An Appetite for Life with Julie McCarron, about Gold's struggle with and eventual recovery from anorexia.

In 2005, Gold pleaded guilty to a September 3, 2004 incident of felony drunken driving. The SUV she was driving had veered off the highway and rolled down an embankment, causing injuries to her husband and two sons. As a result, she was placed on three years' probation and ordered to complete 30 days of work release and 240 hours of community service.

== Filmography ==
=== Film ===
Year	Title	Role	Notes
1978	A Rainy Day	Stephanie as a Child	Short film
1982	Shoot the Moon	Marianne Dunlap	
1986	The Best of Time	Jaki's Friend (uncredited)	
1988	The Girl Next Door	Annie	
1990	The Willies	Carol Seaver	
1996	Face of Evil	Darcy Palmer	
1998	Wanted	Sue Bentley	
2001	What's the Worst That Could Happen?	Woman at Auction (uncredited)	
2008	Solar Flare	Dr. Joanna Clark	
2011	Your Love Never Fails	Samantha Pierce	Video
2014	My Dad's a Soccer Mom	Lori Brookstone	
2016	All Hallows' Eve	Didi Hallow	

=== Television ===
Year	Title	Role	Notes
1976	Captains and the Kings	Rosemary Armagh	Miniseries
1977	Roots	Young Missy Anne Reynolds	Miniseries
1978	The Dark Secret of Harvest Home	Missy Penrose	Miniseries
1978	Night Cries	Donna Blankenship	TV movie
1978	Little Mo	Cindy Brinker	TV movie
1978	Quincy, M.E.	Lisa Carson	Episode: "A Test for Living"
1979	The Incredible Journey of Doctor Meg Laurel	Laurie Mae Moon	TV movie
1979	Eight Is Enough	Tracey Kappleton	Episode: "Best of Friends"
1979	Jennifer: A Woman's Story	Emma Prince	TV movie
1979	The Child Stealer	Pam	TV movie
1979	CHiPs	Linda/Donna	Episode: "Drive, Lady, Drive: Parts 1 & 2"
1979	Fantasy Island	Monica	Episode: "Amusement Park/Rock Stars"
1979–1980	Shirley	Michelle Miller	13 episodes
1980	Here's Boomer	Laurie	Episode: "Overboard"
1980	Trapper John, M.D.	Ellie	Episode: "Girl Under Glass: Parts 1 & 2"
1980	Marilyn: The Untold Story	Young Norma Jean	TV movie
1981	CBS Afternoon Playhouse	Carrie	Episode: "I Think I'm Having a Baby"
1981	A Few Days in Weasel Creek	Buddy	TV movie
1981	CBS Library	Jane	Episode: "A Tale of Four Wishes"
1982	Father Murphy	Jenny	Episode: "Eight-Eight Keys to Happiness"
1982	Beyond Witch Mountain	Tia	TV movie
1982	The Phoenix	Jan	Episode: "The Fire Within"
1983	Another Woman's Child	Lisa	TV movie
1983	ABC Afterschool Special	Ari Jacobs	Episode: "The Hand Me Down Kid"
1983	Thursday's Child	Alix	TV movie
1983	Who Will Love My Children?	Pauline Fray	TV movie
1983	Fantasy Island	Michelle Robbins	Episode: "Three's a Crowd/Second Time Around"
1983–1984	Goodnight, Beantown	Susan Barnes	18 episodes
1984	Trapper John, M.D.	Jennifer Robins	Episode: "Where There's a Will"
1985	A Reason to Live	Ellen Maynes	TV movie
1985	Lots of Luck	Cindy Maris	TV movie
1985	Benson	Laura	Episode: "Katie's Cousin"
1985–1992	Growing Pains	Carol Seaver	166 episodes
1986	The Blinkins	Shady (voice)	TV movie
1988	Dance 'til Dawn	Angela Strull	TV movie
1990	DuckTales: The Movie Special	Hostess	TV movie
1990	ABC Afterschool Special	Shauna Kelly	Episode: "A Question About Sex"
1993	Labor of Love: The Arlette Schweitzer Story	Christa Uchytil	TV movie
1994	For the Love of Nancy	Nancy Walsh	TV movie
1995	Sleep, Baby, Sleep	Sylvie Pierson	TV movie
1995	Lady Killer	Sharon	TV movie
1995	Beauty's Revenge	Beth	TV movie
1995	Stolen Innocence	Stacy	TV movie
1996	A Kidnapping in the Family	Sarah Landers Taylor	TV movie
1996	Face of Evil	Darcy Palmer / Barbara Richards	TV movie
1996	The Perfect Daughter	Alexandra Michaelson	TV movie
1996	Diagnosis: Murder	Amy	Episode: "An Explosive Murder"
1996	To Face Her Past	Lori Molina	TV movie
1998	Dirty Little Secret	Sarah Wheetley	TV movie
1998	Touched by an Angel	Darlene Jones	Episode: "Vengeance Is Mine: Part 1"
1998	Promised Land	Darlene Jones	Episode: "Vengeance Is Mine: Part 2"
1998	The Girl Next Door	Anne 'Annie' Nolan	TV movie
1999	A Crime of Passion	Alyssa Pierce	TV movie
2000	Chicken Soup for the Soul	Anita	1 episode
2000	Stolen from the Heart	Leslie Wagner	TV movie
2000	Twice in a Lifetime	Blair Wilson / Polly Murtaugh	Episode: "Party Girls"
2000	The Growing Pains Movie	Carol Seaver	TV movie
2001	She's No Angel	Liddy Carlyle	TV movie
2002	Wildfire 7: The Inferno	Nell Swanson	
2003	Stephen King's Dead Zone	Penny Barton	Episode: "Misbegotten"
2004	Growing Pains: Return of the Seavers	Carol Seaver	TV movie
2005	Captive Hearts	Elizabeth Sorenson	TV movie
2006	Safe Harbor	Carly Segan	
2006	Trapped in TV Guide	Host	
2007	Final Approach	Lina Howren	TV movie
2009	Sight Unseen	Molly	TV movie
2012	Arachnoquake	Katelynn	TV movie
2013	Melissa & Joey	Polly	Episode: "Something Happened"
2016	I Know Where Lizzie Is	Judith	TV movie
2017	Battle of the Network Stars	Herself	Episode: "Competition 20"
2017	Daily Blast Live	Herself	Host
2022	Worst Cooks in America	Herself	Contestant (season 24)

== Book ==
- Room to Grow: An Appetite for Life (with Julie McCarron), New Millennium, 2003. ISBN 978-1893224667
