= Wake Up Living =

Studio album by Kalan Porter
- Released: August 28, 2007
- Recorded: 2005–2007
- Genre: Pop
- Length: 39:25
- Label: Sony BMG
- Producer: Brian Malouf

Kalan Porter chronology
219 Days (2004)	Wake Up Living (2007)

Wake Up Living is the second album by Canadian singer Kalan Porter, the 2004 winner of Canadian Idol. The album was produced and mixed by Brian Malouf. It was released August 28, 2007 on Sony BMG.

== Background ==
In contrast to his first album, 219 Days, he describes this second effort as being more reflective of what he would like to do musically, and he co-wrote most of this album's songs. The lead single, "Down in Heaven", is a tribute to his mother's battle with breast cancer. The second single is "Destination (Where I Belong)", and its video premiered on MuchMusic in November 2007. A music video for the third single, "Hurray", was released in spring 2008.

== Track listing ==
1. "Down in Heaven" (Kalan Porter, Chris Farren, Ashley Gorley)
2. "Destination (Where I Belong)" (Porter, Luke McMaster, Rob Wells)
3. "Hurray" (Porter, Stevie Salas, Greg Johnston)
4. "Run Run Run" (Sascha Skarbek, Alex Reid)
5. "Try" (Porter, Dave Thompson, Dave Martin)
6. "One Last Try" (Hiten Bahradia, Jamie Hartman)
7. "Beauty" (David Mead)
8. "Karma King" (Porter, Peter Zizzo)
9. "Wrong" (Wells, Matt Marston, Anders Kallmark)
10. "Walk On Home" (Porter, Mark Makoway, Jeff Pearce)
11. "Out of My Head" (Porter, Parthenon Huxley, Stevie Salas)

== Singles ==
- "Down in Heaven"
- "Destination (Where I Belong)"
- "Hurray"

== Personnel ==
- Kalan Porter – vocals, violin, strings
- Julian Coryell – electric and acoustic guitars
- David Levita – electric and acoustic guitars
- Dave Palmer – grand piano, synthesizers
- Curt Schneider – bass
- Aaron Sterling – drums
- George Stanford – rhythm and acoustic guitar overdubs, keyboards, percussion, background vocals
- Brian Malouf – loops, percussion, pads
- Marshall Altman – background vocals
