= Awake in a Dream (song) =

Single by Kalan Porter

from the album 219 Days
- Released: October 5, 2004
- Recorded: 2004
- Genre: Pop
- Length: 4:07
- Label: Vik/BMG
- Songwriter(s): Rupert Gayle, Adam Alexander, Chris Perry
- Producer(s): Perry Alexander

Kalan Porter singles chronology
| "Awake in a Dream" (2004) | "Single" (2005) |

"Awake in a Dream" was the debut single released by Canadian singer-songwriter Kalan Porter. It was written by Rupert Gayle, Adam Alexander, and Chris Perry as the coronation song for the winner of the second season of Canadian Idol. Porter and runner-up Theresa Sokyrka each performed "Awake in a Dream" on the show and recorded a studio version in the event they won. The song later appeared on Porter's 2004 debut studio album, 219 Days.

The single was released on October 5, 2004, in Canada, where it became the fastest-selling 2004 release. It debuted at number one on the Canadian Singles Chart, where it stayed for eight weeks. It became the biggest-selling debut single by a Canadian artist. "Awake in a Dream" was certified 8× Platinum by Music Canada (formerly the Canadian Recording Industry Association) in November 2004 for sales of over 80,000 units.

== Track listing ==
1. "Awake in a Dream"
2. "Awake in a Dream (Instrumental Version)"

== Charts ==
| Chart (2004) | Peak position |
|---|---|
| Canadian Singles Chart | 1 |
| R&R Canada AC Top 30 | 3 |
| R&R Canada Hot AC Top 30 | 25 |

== Certifications ==
| Region | Certification | Certified units/sales |
|---|---|---|
| Canada (Music Canada) | 8× Platinum | 80,000^{^} |
^{^} Shipments figures based on certification alone.
