= Glen Ballard =

American songwriter (born 1953)

- Born: Basil Glen Ballard Jr. May 1, 1953 (age 73); Natchez, Mississippi, U.S.
- Genres: Pop, rock, R&B
- Occupations: Songwriter, lyricist, record producer
- Instruments: Keyboards, synthesizer, guitar
- Years active: 1971–present

Basil Glen Ballard Jr. (born May 1, 1953) is an American songwriter, lyricist, and record producer. He is best known for co-writing and producing on Wilson Phillips' debut and sophomore albums, Wilson Phillips and Shadows and Light, as well as co-writing and producing on Alanis Morissette's 1995 album Jagged Little Pill and Dave Matthews Band's 2001 album Everyday. As a songwriter, he co-wrote songs including "All I Need", "Man in the Mirror", "Hold On", "Hand in My Pocket", and Josh Groban's "Believe". As a producer, he has worked with Van Halen, Bon Jovi, No Doubt, Shelby Lynne, Goo Goo Dolls, P.O.D., Annie Lennox and others.

Ballard founded the production company Augury in 2011. In collaboration with Alan Silvestri, he wrote the score for a musical adaptation of Back to the Future. He was inducted into the Songwriters Hall of Fame in 2023.

== Early life ==
Ballard grew up in Natchez, Mississippi, where he began playing the piano and writing songs at an early age. His maternal grandfather was John R. Junkin, a speaker of the Mississippi House of Representatives. He began playing guitar and playing in a band called the Unknowns beginning in the fourth grade. While attending the University of Mississippi, where he is a member of the Mississippi Gamma chapter of Sigma Alpha Epsilon, he released a solo album. He earned a bachelor's degree in English, journalism, and political science, graduating in 1975.

== Career ==
=== 1970s ===
After college, Ballard moved to Los Angeles with $400 and the phone number of the only person his uncle knew in L.A., a golf pro at the Bel-Air Country Club, whom Ballard called and asked if they knew anyone in the music business. The only person they knew was Tutti Camarata, the owner of Sunset Sound Recorders, who invited Ballard to a recording session. Camerata offered Ballard some studio time, which Ballard used to develop his songwriting, arranging, and production skills. He began working for a division of Rocket Records and continued learning about the music business. In 1978 Ballard wrote a song for Rocket artist Kiki Dee, which led to his being signed as a staff songwriter for MCA Music Publishing.

=== 1980s ===
Ballard wrote, played, and produced an increasing number of songs and projects in the 1980s, contributing to albums by the Pointer Sisters, Paula Abdul, Camilo Sesto, and others. He co-wrote and produced the title track "All I Need" on Jack Wagner's 1984 debut album All I Need. He also co-wrote the song "You Look So Good in Love", a hit for George Strait in 1983 and one of Strait's biggest hits.

When a song Ballard co-wrote was included on George Benson's 1980 album Give Me the Night, Quincy Jones took notice of his abilities, and in 1985 Jones hired Ballard as a songwriter and producer for his Qwest Records label. In 1987, when Jones invited a group of songwriters to his home to write hit songs for Michael Jackson's upcoming album, Siedah Garrett and Ballard co-wrote "Man in the Mirror". The song topped the Billboard Hot 100 for two weeks, and was certified 3× Platinum by the Recording Industry Association of America (RIAA). It was nominated for Record of the Year at the 31st Annual Grammy Awards.

In 1989, producer Richard Perry introduced Ballard to Wilson Phillips, and they collaborated in his Encino home studio to produce a four-song demo that included the song "Hold On", co-written by Ballard. The demo earned the group a record deal, and Ballard produced the trio's commercially successful debut album, released in 1990. "Hold On" was the album's lead single and won the Billboard Music Award for Hot 100 Single of the Year for 1990. It became a worldwide hit, earning two nominations at the 33rd Annual Grammy Awards. In 2017, Billboard ranked the song 15th on its list of "100 Greatest Girl Group Songs of All Time".

=== 1990s ===
Ballard and Garrett collaborated with Jackson to write the song "Keep the Faith" from his 1991 album, Dangerous, and the song "I Never Even Told You", included on the soundtrack for the 1993 animated film Batman: Mask of the Phantasm. In 1992, Ballard worked with Wilson Phillips on their second studio album, Shadows and Light.

In March 1994, Ballard's publishing company introduced him to Alanis Morissette, and the two worked together at Ballard's home studio to write and record demos of the songs that became Jagged Little Pill. Ballard and Morissette took the demos to various record labels that passed. In January 1995, they approached Guy Oseary at Maverick Records, who signed Morissette. Released in June 1995, the album was the best-selling album of 1996, and won Grammy Awards for Best Rock Album and Album of the Year. It is one of the best-selling albums of all time, and ranked by Rolling Stone as one of the 500 Greatest Albums of All Time. Morissette again collaborated with Ballard on her 1998 follow-up, Supposed Former Infatuation Junkie.

Other artists with whom Ballard co-wrote and/or co-produced projects in the 1990s include Curtis Stigers, Lea Salonga, Van Halen, Aerosmith, and The Corrs. In 1997, he launched Java Records as a joint venture with Capitol Records. He wrote the screenplay for the 1999 film Clubland, a music-driven film about an aspiring musician in Los Angeles.

=== 2000s ===
In 2000, Dave Matthews flew to Los Angeles to meet with Ballard with the intention of finishing material for an upcoming Dave Matthews Band album, and ended up co-writing 12 new songs with Ballard in 10 days. Ballard produced the album, Everyday, which was released the next year. In 2001, Ballard's Java label moved from Capitol to the Island/Def Jam family of labels.

In 2001 a 17-year-old Katy Perry, then known as Katy Hudson, moved to Los Angeles to work with Ballard due to his past work with Morissette, one of her major inspirations. In 2004 she signed to Ballard's Java Records label and began work on a solo record to be released in 2005, but the record was shelved after the label was dropped. Ballard introduced her to Tim Devine at Columbia Records, where she was signed as a solo artist.

Ballard worked with Lisa Marie Presley to develop her debut 2003 albumTo Whom It May Concern, co-writing five of its tracks. He also produced or co-produced albums by No Doubt, Shelby Lynne, Goo Goo Dolls, P.O.D., Annie Lennox, Anouk, and Idina Menzel. Together with Dave Stewart he established Sly-Fi, a production partnership.

Ballard co-wrote several songs for film with Alan Silvestri, including "Believe", performed by Josh Groban in The Polar Express (2004), which won the 2006 Grammy Award for Best Song Written for a Motion Picture, Television or Other Visual Media. Ballard and Silvestri again collaborated on "Gently as She Goes" and "A Hero Comes Home", performed by Robin Wright and Idina Menzel) in Beowulf (2007); "Butterfly Fly Away", performed by Miley Cyrus and Billy Ray Cyrus in Hannah Montana: The Movie (2009); and "God Bless Us Everyone", performed by Andrea Bocelli in A Christmas Carol (2009).

=== 2010s ===
In 2010, Ballard reunited with Wilson Phillips for the trio's first Christmas album. Other artists with whom Ballard co-wrote and/or co-produced projects in the 2010s include Stevie Nicks and Anastacia. He co-wrote songs on albums by Ringo Starr, as well as "Shine Your Way", performed by Owl City and Yuna) in the 2013 film The Croods.

In 2011 Ballard founded his own production company, Augury, focused on developing music-driven projects in film, television, and theater.

Ballard co-wrote the music and lyrics for Ghost the Musical with David A. Stewart and Bruce Joel Rubin. The stage musical adaptation of the 1990 film of the same name opened in London's West End in 2011 and on Broadway in 2012.

On January 31, 2014, it was announced that Back to the Future: The Musical, a stage musical adaptation of the 1985 film, was in production. Ballard and Silvestri co-wrote the musical's original music and lyrics, which were combined with songs from the film. The musical premiered in Manchester on February 20, 2020, ahead of a 2021 West End transfer, and won the Laurence Olivier Award for Best New Musical in 2022. It opened on Broadway in 2023.

In 2019, Jagged Little Pill, a jukebox musical inspired by the 1995 album of the same name opened on Broadway after a successful limited engagement in Cambridge, Massachusetts. The show included not only songs from Jagged Little Pill but also other songs co-written by Ballard and Morissette, including "Thank U", "That I Would Be Good", and "So Pure" from 1998's Supposed Former Infatuation Junkie. At the rescheduled Tony Awards for 2020, the show garnered 15 nominations and two awards, in addition to winning the Grammy Award for Best Musical Theater Album.

=== 2020s ===
Ballard was involved in the development of the 2020 Netflix TV series The Eddy, co-writing the music and serving as an executive producer.

He again collaborated with Silvestri to co-write four new songs for the soundtrack of Disney's 2022 live-action film adaptation of Pinocchio.

== Legacy ==
Ballard established the Glen Ballard Music Composition and Production Scholarship with the Los Angeles College of Music to support music education.

== Recording studios ==
Ballard established recording studios, named Aerowave Studios, in Hollywood and Encino. Additionally, Ballard and David Stewart had a joint creative studio in Los Angeles named High Window.

== Awards and honors ==
Association	Year	Category	Work	Result	Ref(s)
Academy Awards	2005	Best Original Song	"Believe"	Nominated	
Golden Globe Awards	2005	Best Original Song	"Believe"	Nominated	
Grammy Awards	1991	Album of the Year	Wilson Phillips	Nominated	
Grammy Awards	1991	Song of the Year	"Hold On"	Nominated	
Grammy Awards	1991	Best Instrumental Arrangement Accompanying Vocal(s)	"The Places You Find Love"	Won	
Grammy Awards	1991	Producer of the Year, Non-Classical	—	Nominated	
Grammy Awards	1996	Album of the Year	Jagged Little Pill	Won	
Grammy Awards	1996	Best Rock Album	Jagged Little Pill	Won	
Grammy Awards	1996	Song of the Year	"You Oughta Know"	Nominated	
Grammy Awards	1996	Best Rock Song	"You Oughta Know"	Won	
Grammy Awards	1996	Producer of the Year, Non-Classical	—	Nominated	
Grammy Awards	1997	Record of the Year	"Ironic"	Nominated	
Grammy Awards	1998	Best Long Form Music Video	Jagged Little Pill, Live	Won	
Grammy Awards	2006	Best Song Written for Motion Picture, Television or Other Visual Media	"Believe"	Won	
Hollywood Music in Media Awards	2021	Best Original Song in a TV Show/Limited Series	"The Eddy"	Nominated	
Hollywood Music in Media Awards	2022	Best Original Song in a Streamed Film (No Theatrical Release)	"I Will Always Dance"	Nominated	
Laurence Olivier Awards	2022	Best Original Score or New Orchestrations	Back to the Future: The Musical	Nominated	
Satellite Awards	2005	Best Original Song	"Believe"	Nominated	
World Soundtrack Awards	2005	Best Original Song Written Directly for a Film	"Believe"	Nominated	
World Soundtrack Awards	2008	Best Original Song Written Directly for a Film	"A Hero Comes Home"	Nominated	

In 1997, Ballard was named ASCAP Songwriter of the Year for co-writing "Hand In My Pocket", "Ironic", "You Learn", and "You Oughta Know" with Morissette. The same year, he was also named Songwriter of the Year by the National Academy of Songwriters.

In 2008, Ballard's alma mater, the University of Mississippi, inducted him into the Ole Miss Alumni Hall of Fame. In 2023, the university awarded him the 2023 Medal for the Arts.

In 2023, Ballard was inducted into the Songwriters Hall of Fame. The same year, he was selected as a Hollywood Walk of Fame class of 2024 honoree in the category of recording. His honoree star was unveiled during a ceremony held on July 11, 2024, in the presence of Wilson Phillips who each honoured his contribution to their career and considering him band's unofficial fourth member.

== See also ==
- Albums produced by Glen Ballard
- Songs written by Glen Ballard
