= Paul Schneider (director) =

American film and television director

Paul Schneider is an American film and television director. Some of his directorial credits include Baywatch, Beverly Hills, 90210, L.A. Law and JAG. He has also directed a number of television films, including You Lucky Dog and Can of Worms for Disney Channel.
