= Kalan Porter =

Canadian pop singer & songwriter

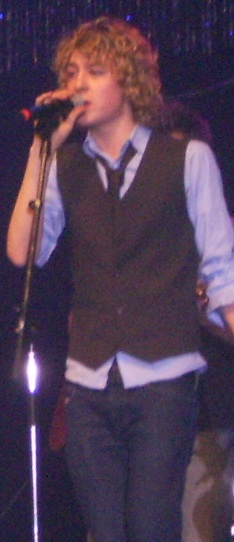
- Porter in 2007

Background information
- Born: Richard Kalan Porter; November 11, 1985 (age 41); Medicine Hat, Alberta, Canada
- Origin: Irvine, Alberta, Canada
- Genre: Pop
- Occupation: Singer-songwriter
- Years active: 2004–2011
- Label: Sony Music Canada

Richard Kalan Porter (born November 11, 1985) is a Canadian singer and songwriter from Medicine Hat, Alberta, and the winner of the reality television series Canadian Idol in 2004. He started to sing at an early age and is classically trained, playing several instruments, most notably, the violin and viola. He writes and arranges violin solos for many of his songs. Porter's first single "Awake in a Dream" is the best selling debut single for a Canadian artist to date and has been certified 8× Platinum by the Canadian Recording Industry Association. He is also the highest selling solo Canadian Idol singer. In 2013, he was a graduate student in business at the Wharton School at the University of Pennsylvania.

== Early years ==
Porter grew up on a buffalo ranch outside Medicine Hat, Alberta. He is a classically trained musician. His mother used to take him to music lessons, saying that one day he would thank her, and he has said that he now thanks her. He played in a family band, which played a variety of music, including covers of popular rock and pop songs, as well as their own compositions. In 2004, he was preparing to leave home for Montreal to study viola performance at the Schulich School of Music in McGill University, when he decided to audition for Canadian Idol.

Kalan's sister MacKenzie Porter would become a successful actress and country and pop musician. Their grandfather Bob Porter was Member of Parliament for Medicine Hat from 1984 to 1993.

== Canadian Idol ==
Beating out 8,977 other contestants, Porter was crowned "Idol" on September 16, 2004, in front of a live TV audience. For three seasons he was the only contestant in Canadian Idol who had never been in the bottom three or two. In Season 5, Jaydee Bixby made it to the finale without ever being placed in the bottom group.

== Post-Idol career ==
=== 2004–2005: 219 Days ===
Porter's first single "Awake in a Dream" was released on October 5, 2004, and debuted at number 1. It spent a total of 8 weeks at the top of the charts and has become the best-selling debut single for a Canadian artist to date, as it was certified 8× Platinum by the Canadian Recording Industry Association in November 2004. His debut album 219 Days, released November 23, 2004, debuted at number four on the Canadian albums chart. The album title, 219 Days, refers to the number of days from his first audition to the release of his debut CD. Since its release, it reached double platinum status in Canada. It was recorded at Metalworks Studios in Mississauga, Ontario. Porter completed a cross-Canada, 65-date tour in 2005. Most of these shows were sold out.

In 2006, Porter received three Juno Award nominations: Artist of the Year, Album of the Year for 219 Days, and Pop Album of the Year. He was a presenter at the 2006 Juno Awards in Halifax. He won MuchMusic's People's Choice Award for the Favourite Canadian Artist in 2005.

Later in 2006, BMG gave Porter time off before recording his second album. He returned home to his family's buffalo and cattle ranch to be with his mother and grandmother. His mother was undergoing chemotherapy for breast cancer, and his grandmother was awaiting surgery.

=== 2007–2008: Wake Up Living ===
Porter's second album, Wake Up Living, was released on August 28, 2007, and debuted at number 7 on the Canadian albums chart. The first single, "Down in Heaven" (which Porter wrote as a tribute to his mother) was available to radio stations from June 4, and reached number 25 on the Canadian Hot 100.

The music video for the second single from the album, "Destination (Where I Belong)" premiered in November 2007. The track "Walk On Home" was used as the contestant elimination song for Canadian Idol's fifth season.

SOCAN honoured Porter and his co-writer Gregory Johnston with a No. 1 Award for their song "Hurray", which reached the top spot on the MuchMusic Countdown chart on May 29.

== Discography ==
- 219 Days (2004)
- Wake Up Living (2007)

== See also ==
- Canadian rock
- Music of Canada
