= Gabby Revilla =

American film producer

Gabriela Revilla (born May 23, 1982) is a Nicaraguan-born American film director and producer and writer. She began her career as a talent booker within the areas of music, celebrity, sports and theater for television, live events, interactive, and film, eventually leading to casting and producing for multi-platform web initiatives and motion pictures. She is a celebrity booker in the music and celebrity talent world, with an incredibly diverse portfolio. In addition to producing, casting, and talent booking, she is also a writer with several projects currently in development.

== Biography ==
Gabby Revilla is an independent producer and the principal of Revek Entertainment. By the end of 2013, Revilla will have produced 8 titles including, Jason Blum’s Stage Fright, Caliber Media and Revek Entertainment’s Some Kind of Hate, Peter and Antonia Bogdanovich's, "Phantom Halo", and Paramount Insurge's Destination Wedding. Her company also owns GNR Casting & Talent which has cast and booked TV and multi-media projects for AOL, Café Mom, GSN, Bravo, Rogue State, The Conlin Company, World of Wonder, etc. She has produced several films including Matthew Lillard's directorial debut, Fat Kid Rules The World, winner of the Audience Award at the SXSW Film Festival. She has also produced short film projects for Universal, Right of Way Films, and Blumhouse. Most recently, Gabby produced Jason Reitman and Jason Blum's Whiplash, which won the Sundance Jury Selection Short Film Award.

Gabby began her career at Live Nation where she booked artists such as Gavin DeGraw, George Carlin, Jaguars, and the Backstreet Boys at clubs and theaters. She went on to work for Martin Short and his critically acclaimed Broadway show, Fame Becomes Me, booking celebrity talent, including Conan O'Brien, Jon Stewart, Jerry Seinfeld, Victor Garber, and Matthew Broderick, for 8 shows a week during its entire duration. Gabby then moved to MTV Networks where she played key roles in booking talent for Sucker Free, The Big Ten, TRL, Mi TRL, Fashionista, Nick Cannon's Wild 'n Out, MTV Cribs, the MTV Movie Awards, MTV Video Music Awards, and more. She was also a key player in securing additional revenue for MTV's bilingual channel MTV Tr3s in film studio marketing dollars. During this time, CNN, featured her in their article, "Faces of the Future." In 2009, Gabby joined The Wendy Williams Show as Talent Executive for two seasons until she left to pursue film and TV endeavors in Los Angeles. She currently has several projects in development. Revilla is represented by APA.

In 2014 Revilla become one of 20th Century Fox's FWI writers intensive fellows. Gabby's Revek Entertainment, continues to work with Top networks and industry talent on film, new media content and celebrity talent booking as a production company with a diverse portfolio.

== Filmography ==
=== Producer ===
- The Automatic Hate (2015) // feature film
- Phantom Halo (2013 ) // feature film
- Breakdown (2013) // short film
- Family Trade (2013) // TV series, associate producer
- Whiplash (2013) // short film, line producer
- Paraphobia (2013) // feature film
- MTV Video Music Awards (2008) // TV special
- MTV Video Music Awards (2007) // TV special

=== Talent Executive/Booker ===
- The Eric Andre Show (2013) // TV series
- The Wendy Williams Show (2009-2010) // TV series
- MTV Los Premios (2009) // TV movie
- Made (2007-2009) // TV series
- Karlifornia (2008) // TV series
- mtvU Woodie Awards (2008) // TV special
- Total Request Live (2007-2008) // TV series
- Los Premios MTV (2008) // TV movie
- MTV Video Music Awards (2008) // TV special
- Mi TRL (2006-2008) // TV series
- MTV Tr3s Fashionista (2008) // TV movie
- A Night for Vets: An MTV Concert for the Brave (2008) // TV special
- mtvU Woodie Awards (2007) // TV special
- MTV Los Premios (2007) // TV special
- Nick Cannon Presents: Wild 'N Out (2007) TV series
- mtvU Woodie Awards (2006) // TV special

=== Casting Director ===
- Family Trade (2013) //TV series
- Karlifornia (2008) // TV series
- MTV Tr3s Fashionista (2008) // TV movie
- Mi TRL (2006) // TV series – Episode #1.1

=== Casting Department ===
- Destination Wedding (2013) // feature film
- Fat Kid Rules the World (2012) // feature film
- MTV Tr3s Fashionista (2008) // TV movie

=== Writer ===
- Breakdown (2013) // short film

=== Production Manager ===
- Fat Kid Rules the World (2012) // feature film
- MTV Movie Awards (2008) // TV special
