= List of American Academy of Dramatic Arts people =

== Notable alumni ==
A

- Walter Abel, 1918
- Jay Acovone, 1978
- Marla Adams, 1958
- Derek Ahonen
- Suzanne Alexander
- Rae Allen, 1947
- Don Amendolia, 1966
- Gordon Anderson
- Tige Andrews, 1946
- Kwaw Ansah, 1965
- Carmen Argenziano, 1964
- Katie Aselton, 2004
- Armand Assante, 1969
- Tom Atkins, 1967
- Hank Azaria, 1980

B

- Lauren Bacall, 1942
- Jim Backus, 1933
- Eion Bailey, 1996
- Conrad Bain, 1948
- Brenda Bakke
- Anne Bancroft, 1950
- Diana Barrymore
- Chris Bauer
- Frances Bavier, 1925
- Douglas Carter Beane, 1980
- Graham Beckel, 1972
- Doris Belack, 1945
- Gaston Bell
- Gil Bellows, 1987
- Robby Benson
- Peter Bergman, 1975
- Samuel Bernstein
- Lyle Bettger, 1937
- William Blinn, 1957
- Linwood Boomer, 1977
- Lee Bowman, 1936
- Jocelyn Brando, 1942
- Michael Brandon, 1967
- Laura Branigan, 1972
- Eileen Brennan, 1956
- Lisa Brescia, 1991
- Beth Broderick, 1977
- Adrien Brody, specialized training 1993
- Rose Marie Brown
- Joyce Bulifant, 1958
- Michael J. Burg

C

- J.D. Cannon, 1942
- Dale Carnegie, 1912
- Max Casella, 1987
- John Cassavetes, 1950
- Nick Cassavetes, 1980
- Kim Cattrall, 1974
- Jessica Chastain, 1998
- George Coe, 1956
- Enrico Colantoni, 1985
- Nicholas Colasanto, 1952
- Jennifer Coolidge, 1982
- Amanda Crew
- Hume Cronyn, 1934
- Max Crumm
- Bob Cummings
- Helen Curry

D

- Marc Daniels
- Martin Davidson
- Brad Davis
- Jeremy Davies, 1990
- Johanna Day, 1984
- Cecil B. DeMille, 1900
- William Devane, 1961
- Danny DeVito, 1966
- Colleen Dewhurst, 1947
- Diana Douglas, 1941
- Illeana Douglas, 1983
- Kirk Douglas, 1941
- Cara Duff-MacCormick
- Julia Duffy, 1972
- Nora Dunblane, 1899
- Charles Durning, 1948
- Alexis Dziena

E

- Clare Eames, 1918
- Christine Ebersole, 1975
- Eric Edwards, 1967
- Vince Edwards, 1950
- Ethyl Eichelberger
- David Eigenberg, 1986
- René Enríquez, 1960

F

- James Farentino, 1958
- Gail Fisher, 1958
- Cristina Fontanelli
- Nina Foch, 1942
- Harriet Ford
- Nicole Forester, 1993
- Jorja Fox, 1990
- Elizabeth Franz, 1962
- Deborra-Lee Furness

G

- Troy Garity, 1995
- Sally Gifford
- Gwen Gillen
- Larry Gilliard Jr.
- Joanna Going, 1985
- Joan Goodfellow, 1972
- Ruth Gordon, 1914
- Robert Gossett, 1976
- Bruce Greenwood, 1981
- Luke Grimes, 2004
- Burt Grinstead
- Gugu Gumede, 2012

H

- Leisha Hailey
- Ron Hale, 1967
- Emily Wakeman Hartley
- David Hartman, 1961
- Susan Haskell, 1991
- Anne Hathaway, specialized training 1993
- Dennis Haysbert, 1977
- Florence Henderson, 1953
- Martin Hewitt
- Judd Hirsch, 1962
- Alice Hirson, 1948
- Sterling Holloway, 1923
- David Huddleston, 1958

I

J

- Kate Jackson, 1970
- John James, 1977
- Melissa James Gibson, 1984
- Herbert Jefferson Jr., 1969
- Allen Jenkins, 1922
- Jennifer Jones, 1939

K

- Florence Kahn
- Garson Kanin, 1933
- John Karlen, 1958
- Grace Kelly, 1949
- Elizabeth Kemp
- Sally Kirkland, 1961
- Elias Koteas, 1983
- Stepfanie Kramer, 1977

L

- Casey LaBow, 2007
- Caroline Lagerfelt, 1969
- Judy Landers
- Ron Leibman, 1958
- Sam Levene, 1927
- Matthew Lillard, 1990
- Howard Lindsay, 1908
- Cleavon Little, 1967
- John Lone, 1978
- Marion Lorne, 1904
- Lucille Lortel, 1921
- James Luisi, 1958
- Anna Lundberg, 2018

M

- Taylor Mac
- Harriet E. MacGibbon
- Rosie Malek-Yonan
- Randolph Mantooth
- Mrinalini Sarabhai
- Víctor Andrés Marroquín-Merino, 2020
- Marie-Noelle Marquis
- Robin Mathews, 1994
- Melanie Mayron, 1972
- Stephen McHattie, 1968
- George Meeker, 1922
- Leonard Melfi
- Ioannis Melissanidis
- Dina Merrill, 1944
- Emma Messing
- Justine Miceli, 1982
- Judson Mills, 1991
- Katherine Moennig, 1998
- Samuel Molina, 1950s,
- Frank Morgan, 1914
- Michael Mosley
- Elizabeth Montgomery, 1953
- Agnes Moorehead, 1929
- Frank Morgan, 1914
- Anita Morris, 1962
- Carrie-Anne Moss, 1988
- Don Murray, 1948
- Louis Mustillo, 1983

N

- Mary Nash
- Novella Nelson, 1961
- Eric Nenninger, 1999
- Hayley Marie Norman

O

- Pat O'Brien
- Michael O'Keefe, specialized training 1974
- Keito Okamoto, 2020
- Jim O'Rear
- Timothy Omundson
- Glenn Ordway
- Kelly Overton, 1999
- Catherine Dale Owen

P

- Angel Parker, 1999
- Sarah Paulson, specialized training 1992
- Jimmy Pardo
- Donna Pescow, 1975
- Alex Pettyfer, specialized training 2004
- Michael Pitt, specialized training 1998
- Rick Polizzi, 1983
- Billy Pollina
- Tom Poston, 1947
- William Powell, 1913
- Dory Previn, 1943

R

- Robert Redford, 1959
- Nicolas Winding Refn
- Joe Regalbuto, 1970
- Don Rickles, 1948
- Thelma Ritter, 1922
- Jason Robards, 1948
- Jason Robards Sr., 1911
- Eric Roberts
- John Roberts, 1991
- Edward G. Robinson, 1913
- Zuleikha Robinson, 1997
- Hayden Rorke, 1932
- Gena Rowlands, 1952
- Paul Rudd, 1991
- Rosalind Russell, 1929

S

- Melanie Safka
- Gary Sandy, 1968
- John Savage, 1969
- John Saxon
- Diana Scarwid, 1975
- Kathryn Leigh Scott, 1966
- Joseph Schildkraut, 1913
- William G. Schilling, 1969
- Annabella Sciorra, 1980
- Adam Scott, 1993
- Kim Shaw
- Brooke Smith
- Jaclyn Smith, 1966
- Keith Randolph Smith, 1986
- French Stewart, 1985
- Timothy D. Stickney, 1985
- Slavko Sobin
- Ezra Stone, 1935
- Kevin Sussman
- Loretta Swit, 1959
- Eric Szmanda, 1996

T

- Renée Taylor, 1951
- Ron Taylor, 1975
- Ernest Thomas, 1974
- Gene Tierney
- Gary Tomlin, 1971
- Constance Towers, 1952
- Spencer Tracy, 1923
- Claire Trevor, 1929
- Manu Tupou

V

- Scott Valentine, 1980

W

- Robert Walker, 1939
- M. Emmet Walsh, 1961
- Lucille Watson, 1902
- Peter Weller, 1972
- Karimah Westbrook
- Shannon Whirry
- Warren William, 1915
- Winter Williams, 1984
- August Wittgenstein

Z

- Helena Zachos
- Constance Zimmer, 1990

== Notable faculty ==
- David Dean Bottrell
- Karen Hensel
- Sandy Martin
- Ian Ogilvy
- Scott Reiniger
- Timothy D. Stickney
- Sara Mildred Strauss
