= Fat Kid Rules the World (film) =

- Film poster
- Directed by: Matthew Lillard
- Screenplay by: Michael M.B. Galvin; Peter Speakman
- Based on: Fat Kid Rules the World by KL Going
- Produced by: Jane Charles; Matthew Lillard; Jennifer Maas; Nick Morton; Rick Rosenthal; Talan Torriero; Evan Wasserstrom
- Starring: Jacob Wysocki; Matt O'Leary; Lili Simmons; Dylan Arnold; Billy Campbell; Riley Evetts
- Cinematography: Noah Rosenthal
- Edited by: Michelle M. Witten
- Music by: Mike McCready
- Production companies: Whippany Park Productions; Whitewater Films
- Distributed by: ARC Entertainment
- Release date: March 9, 2012
- Running time: 98 minutes
- Country: United States
- Language: English

Fat Kid Rules the World is a 2012 American comedy-drama film directed by Matthew Lillard in his directorial debut. It is based on the book of the same name and stars Jacob Wysocki, Matt O'Leary, and Billy Campbell.

== Plot ==
17-year-old Troy Billings (Wysocki) is overweight and suicidal. He's saved by Marcus (O'Leary) from jumping in front of a bus and begins an uneasy friendship with Marcus. Marcus then enlists the musically challenged Troy to become the drummer in a new punk rock band. As Troy's relationship with Marcus grows, Troy's father (Campbell) becomes increasingly concerned about his son's new friendship.

== Cast ==
- Jacob Wysocki as Troy Billings
- Matt O'Leary as Marcus
- Billy Campbell as Mr. Billings
- Dylan Arnold as Dayle
- Tyler Trerise as Manoj
- Russell Hodgkinson as Marcus' Stepfather
- Julian Gavilanes as Matt
- Sean Donavan as Ollie
- Lili Simmons as Isabel
- Jeffrey Doornbos as Mr. Sherman
- Matthew Lillard as Guidance Counsellor

== Reception ==
Fat Kid Rules the World received positive reviews from critics, earning an 84% approval rating on Rotten Tomatoes.
