= Triangle Square =

Triangle Square may refer to:

- Triangle Square Press, a publishing imprint
- Triangle Square (film), a 2001 American comedy film
- Speed square, sometimes known as a triangle square
