= Whitewater Films =

- Industry: Film production
- Founded: 1997; 29 years ago
- Founder: Rick Rosenthal
- Headquarters: Los Angeles, California, United States
- Website: whitewaterfilms.com

Whitewater Films is an independent film production company based in Los Angeles, USA. The company was founded in 1997 by veteran producer and director Rick Rosenthal.

== Films ==
- Rusalka (2024) (Development) (Produced by Nicholas Morton and Carly Kimmel)
- Outside the Wire (2023) (Development) (Produced with Film Constellation and Spray Filmes)
- The Cow That Sang a Song About The Future (2022) (Produced with Cinema Defacto, UK Film Council, and Dialetic)
- Stay Awake (2022) (Produced with Maiden Voyage Pictures, 1492 Pictures, Breaker, Live Action Projects, Crooked Media, Cattle Rat Productions, Spacestation, Argessa Cine Productions, Dialetic, Relic Pictures, Washington Square Films, and Kinogo Pictures)
- Small Engine Repair (2021) (produced with Tapestry Films, TMWRK, The Story Factory, and Underground Films)
- To The End (2022)
- Citizen Ashe (2021)
- Civil War (or Who Do We Think We Are) (2021)
- Rebel Hearts (2021)
- The Boy Beyond the Door (2020)
- Love and Stuff (2020)
- Feels Good Man (2020)
- The Last Shift (2020)
- Standing Up, Falling Down (2019)
- Halfway There (2018)
- A Thousand Junkies (2017)
- Destined (2016)
- And Punching the Clown (2016)
- Punching Henry (2016)
- Holy Hell (2016)
- First Girl I Loved (2016)
- Aram, Aram (2015)
- Band of Robbers (2015)
- King Jack (2015)
- The Carnary (2015)
- Cartel Land (2015)
- 7 Minutes (2014)
- Meet the Patels (2014)
- Match (2014)
- Big in Japan (2014)
- Drones (2013)
- Cold Comes the Night (2013) (in association with)
- Afternoon Delight (2013)
- May in the Summer (2013)
- Open Delight (2013)
- Fat Kid Rules the World (2012)
- Arcadia (2012)
- California Solo (2012)
- On the Ice (2011)
- According to Greta (2009)
- Kabluey (2007)
- Nearing Grace (2005)
- Point Pleasant (2005) (TV Series)
- Mean Creek (2004)
- Strong Medicine (2000-2006)
- Just a Little Harmless Sex (1998)
