= Nicole Eggert =

American actress (born 1972)

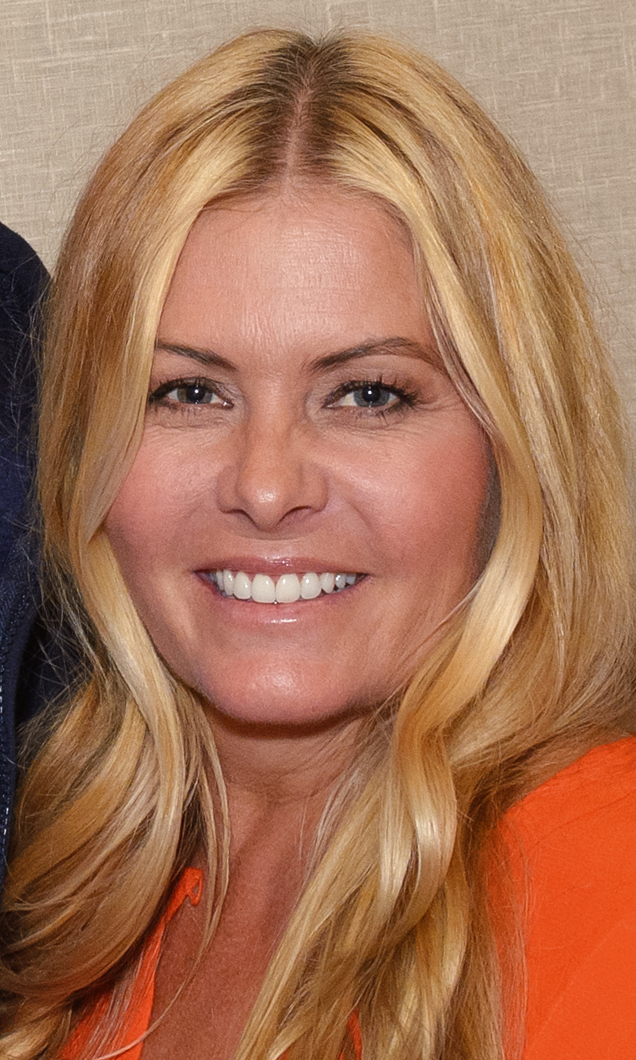
- Eggert in 2017
- Born: Nicole Elizabeth Eggert; January 13, 1972 (age 54); Glendale, California, U.S.
- Occupation: Actress
- Years active: 1977–present
- Known for: Charles in Charge; Baywatch; Who's the Boss?
- Children: 2

Nicole Elizabeth Eggert (born January 13, 1972) is an American actress. Her notable roles include Jamie Powell on the situation comedy Charles in Charge and Summer Quinn on the television series Baywatch. She guest-starred in The Super Mario Bros. Super Show! and Boy Meets World. She appeared in several Christmas movies that premiered on Lifetime. Eggert was also a contestant on the VH1 reality show Celebrity Fit Club in 2010 and came second in 2013 on ABC's celebrity diving show Splash.

== Early life ==
Eggert was born in Glendale, California. Her mother, Gina Duncan, was a British-born talent agent, and her father, Rolf Eggert, was a German-born canning-company executive. Eggert's quest for stardom started when her mother entered her in beauty contests. At age five, Eggert was Miss Universe in the petite division. An agent saw her and offered her parents a role for her in a Johnson's baby shampoo commercial.

== Career ==
In 1979, Eggert starred in When She Was Bad..., opposite Cheryl Ladd and Robert Urich. In 1980, at age eight, Eggert landed a role in the film Rich and Famous, opposite Jacqueline Bisset and Candice Bergen, playing Bergen's character's young daughter. Also in 1980, Eggert provided the voice of Dennis' snobby archrival Margaret Wade in Dennis the Menace in Mayday for Mother, which was the first animated adaptation in the Dennis the Menace trilogy.

Eggert had a recurring role on Who's the Boss? from 1985 to 1986 as Marci Ferguson, a friend of Samantha Micelli (Alyssa Milano). In January 1987, she starred on the situation comedy Charles in Charge as Jamie Powell. In 1989, she hosted the Nickelodeon Kids' Choice Awards with Wil Wheaton. That same year, she was the first guest star to appear on The Super Mario Bros. Super Show!. She starred as Alexa Adams in the TV adaptation of Danielle Steel's Secrets, released in 1992.

Eggert was featured as one of the many lifeguards on seasons three and four on the syndicated series Baywatch, playing the role of Summer Quinn. She appeared on the series from 1992 to 1994 and was originally supposed to be on a Baywatch spin-off. She returned for the reunion film Baywatch: Hawaiian Wedding (2003).

Eggert appeared on Married... with Children season 10 in an episode titled "Enemies" as Shannon (1996), intended to be a backdoor pilot for a spin-off that was not picked up. Eggert also appears on the cover of rock band Sugar Ray's debut album, Lemonade and Brownies.

In 2004, Eggert played the role of Ginger in the first edition of the TBS network's The Real Gilligan's Island reality show. She also appeared on Scott Baio Is 45...and Single (featuring her Charles in Charge co-star Scott Baio) in 2007. On September 23, 2009, VH1 announced Eggert's participation in the winter 2010 season of Celebrity Fit Club. In 2010, Eggert appeared on the Comedy Central Roast of David Hasselhoff.

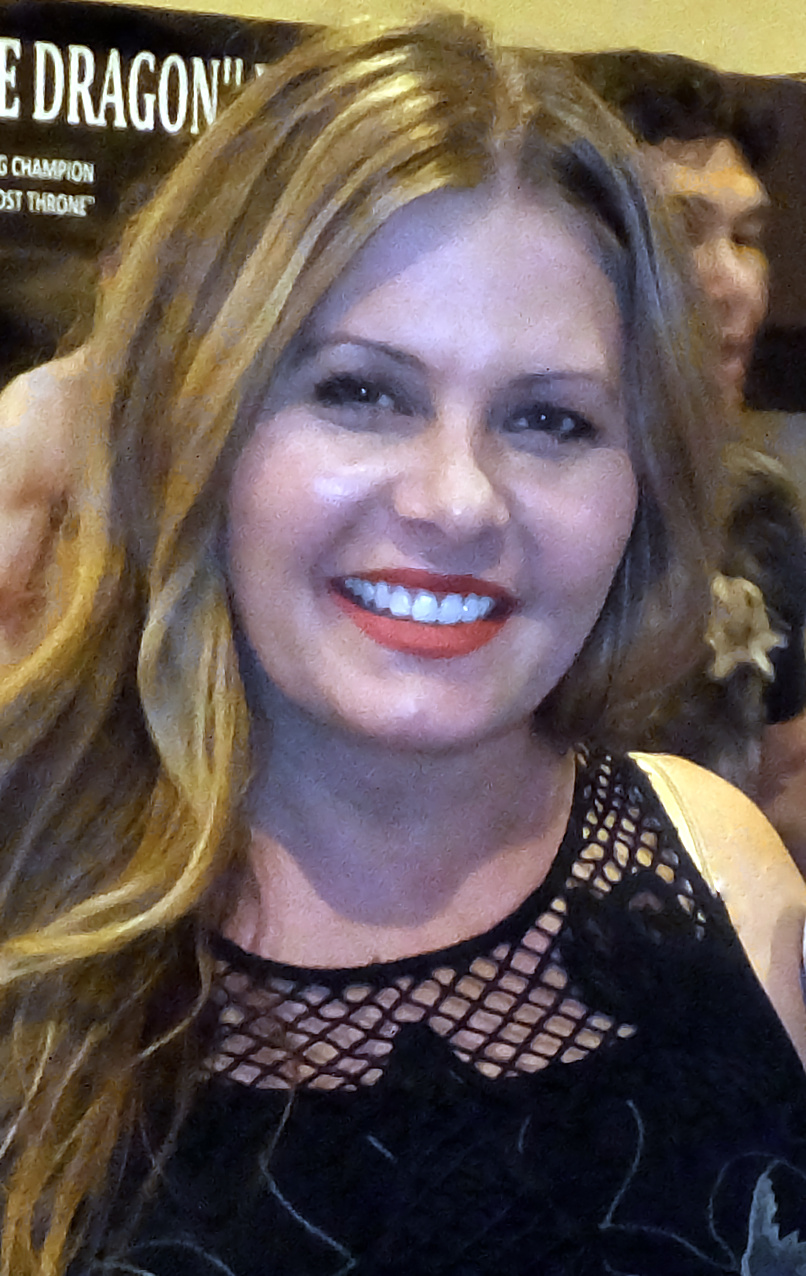
Eggert at the Chiller Theatre Expo 2014

In 2013, Eggert was added to the cast of Splash, the celebrity diving show on ABC. In April, it was reported she was injured during the taping of an episode. In the days following, she denied sustaining any serious injury. In 2014, Eggert began a new career as the owner-operator of an ice-cream truck. In 2019, she appeared on the fourth episode of Back in the Game. She is also the host of the Perfectly Twisted with Nicole Eggert podcast.

In 2024, Eggert was a producer and cast member of After Baywatch: Moment in the Sun, an original docuseries in collaboration with ABC News studios that streamed on Hulu.

== Personal life ==
Eggert has two daughters. Her first daughter's father is actor Justin Herwick; despite numerous rumours and claims to the contrary, Eggert and Herwick were never a married couple. Eggert has never been married, though she was previously engaged to actor Corey Haim, with whom she starred in Blown Away, The Double 0 Kid, and Anything for Love (all were released in 1993). She is credited with helping to save Haim's life at least once by taking him to the hospital to detox during a 'narcotic rush', although she has said: "I spent a lot of nights in emergency rooms with him. I don't think that I saved his life, I just think that I was there for him."

In 2015, she appeared on the television series Botched for a breast reduction.

On January 29, 2018, sexual misconduct allegations made by Eggert against Scott Baio surfaced. In 2013, Eggert stated on the Nik Richie radio show that she and Baio had a one-time encounter "years" after Charles in Charge ended, which would have been after 1990. In the more elaborated account, discussed on The Dr. Oz Show and Megyn Kelly Today, Eggert claimed that Baio molested her beginning in 1986 when she was 14, and that when she was 17, she had intercourse with him. Baio contends that he had sexual relations with Eggert only once, and that the encounter occurred after she had turned 18. Baio explained that Eggert's own words to Richie proved he did not have intercourse with Eggert while she was a minor, since the final episode of Charles in Charge aired in November 1990, ten months after Eggert turned 18.

In December 2023, Eggert was diagnosed with stage 2 invasive cribriform carcinoma of the breast. She initially thought the symptoms were menopause-related, after gaining 25 lbs (11 kg) and experienced "terrible pain" in her left breast. She subsequently underwent a mastectomy, chemotherapy, and radiation. As of May 2025, she was receiving targeted therapy.

== Filmography ==
=== Film ===
Year	Title	Role	Notes
1981	Rich and Famous	Debbie Blake, at 8 Years Old	
1984	Hambone and Hillie	Marci	
1986	The Clan of the Cave Bear	Teen Ayla	
1986	Omega Syndrome	Jessie Corbett	
1989	Kinjite: Forbidden Subjects	DeeDee	
1990	The Haunting of Morella	Morella / Lenora	
1990	Grandpa	Young Woman	
1993	The Double 0 Kid	Melinda Blake	Direct-to-video
1993	Anything for Love	Marie Stark	Direct-to-video
1995	The Demolitionist	Alyssa Lloyd	
1995	Walking Away	Melissa Anderson	
1997	The Price of Kissing	Annette	
1997	Bartender	Marcia	
1997	Pink as the Day She Was Born	Tiffany	
1998	Sleeping Beauties	Sno Blo Band	Short film
1998	Siberia	Kristy	
2000	Submerged	Tiffany Stevens	Direct-to-video
2001	Thank You, Good Night	Janine	
2001	Triangle Square	Julie	
2004	What Lies Above	Diana Pennington	
2006	Cattle Call	Laurel Canyon	Direct-to-video
2006	Dead Lenny	Sally Long	Direct-to-video
2008	Loaded	Allison Ryan	Direct-to-video
2009	Nicole Eggert Is Back in Baywatch	Herself	Direct-to-video
2014	The Dog Who Saved Easter	Gabrielle	Voice role; direct-to-video
2014	F.L.U.I.D.	Herself	Direct-to-video
2025	I Was a Child Bride: The Courtney Stodden Story		

=== Television ===
Year	Title	Role	Notes
1979	When Hell Was in Session	Mary Beth Denton #2	Television film
1979	When She Was Bad...	Robbie Morgan	Television film
1981	Today's FBI		
1981	Someday You'll Find Her, Charlie Brown	Loretta	Voice role; television special
1981	Dennis the Menace in Mayday for Mother	Margaret Wade	Voice role; television special
1981, 1982	Fantasy Island	Amy Watkins, Nancy Warner	2 episodes
1982–1983	T. J. Hooker	Chrissie Hooker	Recurring role (seasons 1–2)
1984	Rose Petal Place	Nicole, the Girl In The Garden	Television short; live-action sequence only
1984, 1990	CBS Schoolbreak Special	Heidi	2 episodes
1985	Rose Petal Place: Real Friends	Nicole, the Girl In The Garden	Television film; live-action sequence only
1985	I Dream of Jeannie... Fifteen Years Later	Melissa	Television film
1985–1986	Who's the Boss?	Marci Ferguson	Guest episode (season 1), recurring role (seasons 2–3)
1985, 1989	The New Leave It to Beaver	Charlene Maitland	2 episodes
1986	Annihilator	Elyse Jeffries	Television film
1987–1990	Charles in Charge	Jamie Powell	Main cast
1989	The Super Mario Bros. Super Show!	Herself	Episode: "Neatness Counts"
1991	What a Dummy		Episode: "Bringing Up Baby"
1992	Secrets	Alexa Adams	Television film
1992	Home Fires	Libby Kramer	Recurring role
1992–1994	Baywatch	Roberta "Summer" Quinn	Main cast (seasons 3–4)
1993	Blown Away	Megan Bower	Television film
1994	Heaven Help Us	Natalie	Episode: "The Temptress"
1995	Burke's Law	Chelsea Rudd	Episode: "Who Killed the Gadget Man?"
1995	Amanda and the Alien	Amanda Patterson	Television film
1996	Frequent Flyer	Miriam Rawlings	Television film
1996	Married... with Children	Shannon	Episode: "Enemies"
1996	Clueless	Summer Bonet	Episode: "Kiss Me Kip"
1997	Duckman		Voice role; episode: "Vuuck, as in Duck"
1997	The Big Easy	Laurel Attery	Episode: "A Streetcar with Desire"
1999	Boy Meets World	Bridget	Episode: "Pickett Fences"
2000	The Outer Limits	Sarah Burnham	Episode: "Revival"
2000	Murder Seen	Zoey Drayden	Television film
2000	Sexiest Bachelor in America Pageant	Herself	Judge; television special
2001	Gilmore Girls	Aubrey	Episode: "Like Mother, Like Daughter"
2001	The Test	Herself	Panelist; episode: "The Matrimony Test"
2003	Baywatch: Hawaiian Wedding	Roberta "Summer" Quinn	Television film
2003	Wall of Secrets	Paige Emerson	Television film
2003	Devil Winds	Julia Merrow	Television film
2004	Decoys	Detective Amanda Watts	Television film
2006	Lightspeed	Beth Baker	Television film
2006	Celebrity Paranormal Project	Herself	Episode: "Wooden Lucy"
2007	Holiday Switch	Paula Ferguson	Television film
2008	A Christmas Proposal	Lisa	Television film
2008	Past Lies	Kim Furs	Television film
2009	Phantom Racer	Tammy	Television film
2010	Turbulent Skies	Samantha Woodard	Television film
2010	Keeping Up with the Kardashians	Herself	Episode: "Blame It on the Alcohol"
2010	Celebrity Fit Club	Herself	Contestant (season 7)
2010	Comedy Central Roast	Herself	Episode: "David Hasselhoff"
2011	Celebrity Ghost Stories	Herself	Episode: "Valerie Harper/Mindy Cohn/Mathew Gray/Nicole Eggert"
2013	Splash	Herself	Contestant
2014	Where's the Love?	Paige	Television film
2014	Heartbreakers		Miniseries; episode: "Tainted Love"
2014	Tattoo Nightmares	Herself	Episode: "Baywatch Bimbo!"
2015	Oprah: Where Are They Now?	Herself	2 episodes
2015	Botched	Herself	Patient; episode: "Boob-Watch"
2017	Battle of the Network Stars	Herself	Contestant; episode: "TV Lifeguards vs. Trouble Makers"
2019	Back in the Game	Herself	Episode: "Nicole Eggert"
2019	Robot Chicken	Marion Ravenwood, Ilsa Haupstein	Voice roles; episode: "Musya Shakhtyorov in: Honeyboogers"
2024	After Baywatch: Moment in the Sun	Herself	Docuseries; also producer

== Awards and nominations ==
Association	Year	Category	Nominated work	Result
Young Artist Awards	1983	Best Young Actress, Guest on a Series	Fantasy Island	Nominated
Young Artist Awards	1987	Exceptional Performance by a Young Actress, Guest Starring in a Television, Comedy or Drama Series	Who's the Boss?	Nominated
Young Artist Awards	1988	Exceptional Performance by a Young Actress in a Television Comedy Series	Charles in Charge	Won
Young Artist Awards	1989	Best Young Actress in a Family Syndicated Show	Charles in Charge	Nominated
Young Artist Awards	1990	Best Young Actress in an Off-Primetime Family Series	Charles in Charge	Nominated
Young Artist Awards	1993	Best Young Actress Starring in a Television Series	Baywatch	Nominated
Young Artist Awards	1994	Youth Actress Leading Role in a Television Series	Baywatch	Nominated
