= Domestic Disturbance =

2001 film by Harold Becker

- Theatrical release poster
- Directed by: Harold Becker
- Screenplay by: Lewis Colick
- Story by: Lewis Colick; William S. Comanor; Gary Drucker
- Produced by: Donald De Line; Jonathan D. Krane
- Starring: John Travolta; Vince Vaughn; Teri Polo; Steve Buscemi; Matthew O'Leary
- Cinematography: Michael Seresin
- Edited by: Peter Honess
- Music by: Mark Mancina
- Production company: De Line Pictures
- Distributed by: Paramount Pictures (North America, the United Kingdom, Ireland, Australia, New Zealand, France, Germany, Austria, Switzerland and Japan); Lakeshore International (International)
- Release date: November 2, 2001
- Running time: 89 minutes
- Country: United States
- Language: English
- Budget: $75 million
- Box office: $54.2 million

Domestic Disturbance is a 2001 American psychological thriller film directed by Harold Becker and starring John Travolta, Vince Vaughn, Teri Polo, Steve Buscemi, and Matt O'Leary. The film is about a divorced father who discovers his son's new stepfather is a murderer. The film was released by Paramount Pictures on November 2, 2001 to negative reviews from critics and was a box office bomb, grossing $54.2 million against a $75 million budget.

== Plot ==
In Southport, Maryland, Susan Morrison, recently divorced from her husband Frank, a struggling boat builder, is marrying a younger and wealthier man, Rick Barnes. Susan and Frank's twelve-year-old son Danny is unhappy that his mother is remarrying. Susan asks Frank to allow Rick to go sailing with him and Danny to help Danny bond with Rick.

After the wedding, Danny and Rick play a game of catch, where Rick becomes agitated with Danny's aggressive playing style and starts harshly criticizing him. The revelation that Susan and Rick are having a baby worsens the situation. After finding out about the baby, Danny stows away in Rick's Chevy Suburban. While he is inside, he sees Rick murdering the mysterious stranger Ray Coleman, who earlier attended the wedding unannounced, claiming to be an ex-business associate of Rick.

Danny reports the murder to his father and the police. Rick, however, is considered a pillar of the local community, whereas Danny has a history of lying and misdemeanors. Frank believes his son, though, stemming from Rick's unease around Ray at the ceremony and the fact that Danny never lies to him. Despite this, Danny is forced to keep silent about his reports after Rick tells him that he might harm his father if he continues to talk.

Frank investigates and unearths Rick's criminal past, which puts his son and ex-wife at risk. He learns that Rick's true identity is Jack Parnell, a criminal who was acquitted while his partners, Ray among them, were convicted because he framed them for the crime. Ray had planned to get revenge on Jack by exposing him at the wedding. Jack tries to kill Frank by setting his boathouse on fire, but Frank escapes and exposes Jack's true identity to the police, who head for Susan's house.

At the house, Susan also realizes the truth when she sees Jack tending to a burn on his arm, having heard about the fire at the boathouse minutes earlier. She tries to escape with Danny, but Jack knocks her out and takes Danny as a hostage, intending to flee. Frank arrives to confront Jack, and they engage in a vicious fight, ending when a tied-up Danny pushes Jack into a fuse box, electrocuting and killing him. Susan, meanwhile, had suffered a miscarriage. The police apologize to Danny and Frank for not believing them, and the reunited father and son follow Susan as she is taken to the hospital.

== Cast ==
- John Travolta as Frank Morrison
- Vince Vaughn as Rick Barnes / Jack Parnell
- Teri Polo as Susan Morrison
- Matt O'Leary as Danny Morrison
- Steve Buscemi as Ray Coleman
- Susan Floyd as Diane
- Ruben Santiago-Hudson as Detective Edgar Stevens
- Chris Ellis as Detective Warren
- Angelica Page (appearing as Angelica Torn) as Patty
- Debra Mooney as Theresa

== Production ==
In January 1999, it was reported Paramount Pictures had acquired an untitled thriller pitch, about a man who becomes suspicious of his ex-wife's new husband, written by Lewis Colick to be produced by Donald De Line.

In April 2001, while shooting the film in Wilmington, North Carolina, actor Steve Buscemi was slashed in the face while intervening in a bar fight between his friend Vince Vaughn, screenwriter Scott Rosenberg and a local man, Timothy Fogerty, who allegedly instigated the brawl.

== Release ==
Paramount Pictures held the world premiere of Domestic Disturbance at the studio on October 30, 2001. The film's stars were in attendance as well as many other guest celebrities.

The film was officially released on November 2, 2001, in 2,910 theaters throughout the United States. It was not a financial success, grossing only $45,246,095 domestically. By the end of its run, the film grossed $54 million worldwide from its $75 million budget.

=== Home media ===
The film was released on VHS and DVD on September 3, 2002, by Paramount Home Entertainment.

== Critical reaction ==
Domestic Disturbance was received poorly by critics. It has a 23% rating on Rotten Tomatoes based on 98 reviews, with an average rating of 4/10. The consensus reads: "Well-made but extremely predictable, Domestic Disturbance is an average thriller that may work better on TV." On Metacritic, it holds a score of 29 out of 100, based on reviews from 27 critics, indicating "generally unfavorable" reviews. Audiences polled by CinemaScore gave the film an average grade of "B" on an A+ to F scale.

Roger Ebert awarded it one-and-a-half stars out of a possible four, reciting an anecdote about how the Chicago film critics had been shown the wrong last reel. He saw the correct one the following Monday, and scathingly said of it in his review: "The earlier reel was lacking the final music. Music is the last thing wrong with that reel."

== Accolades ==
Matt O'Leary was nominated for a Young Artist Award, for Best Performance in a Feature Film – Supporting Young Actor. However, star John Travolta was nominated for a Razzie for Worst Actor (also for Swordfish). Vaughn and Travolta later worked together in Be Cool (2005).
