= Bokeh (film) =

2017 science fiction drama film

- Theatrical release poster
- Directed by: Geoffrey Orthwein; Andrew Sullivan
- Written by: Geoffrey Orthwein; Andrew Sullivan
- Produced by: Doug Daulton; Kent Genzlinger; Briene Lermitte
- Starring: Maika Monroe; Matt O'Leary
- Cinematography: Joe Lindsay
- Edited by: Geoffrey Orthwein
- Music by: Keegan DeWitt
- Distributed by: Screen Media Films
- Release dates: February 3, 2017 (SBIFF); March 24, 2017 (US)
- Running time: 92 minutes
- Countries: United States; Iceland
- Language: English

Bokeh is a 2017 science fiction drama film written and directed by Geoffrey Orthwein and Andrew Sullivan. It stars Maika Monroe and Matt O'Leary as two American tourists in Iceland who find everyone else on the island has mysteriously vanished. It premiered at the Santa Barbara International Film Festival and was released theatrically in the United States on March 24, 2017.

== Plot ==
American tourists Jenai and Riley arrive in Iceland and visit several landmarks. Riley has taken his father's Rolleiflex camera and plenty of film. When Jenai questions why he prefers it over a modern digital camera, Riley says he prefers to capture the imperfections of the moment rather than have a computer chip auto-correct all the errors. They visit an old church, and a priest tells them some of its history, calling the pre-Christian times simpler. Jenai reveals that her father is a preacher, though she says his church was not as pretty. After retiring for the night, Jenai seems to wake up in the middle of the night and has trouble falling back asleep. Looking out the window to admire the view, she sees strange flashes of the Northern Lights in the distance.

Hours later, Riley wakes Jenai to get breakfast. They are frustrated to find that their lodging is not serving breakfast, then confused when they find no staff. They continue having trouble locating other people once they leave: the streets are empty, the stores have no staff, and nobody answers their calls. They spot a running car, and, not being able to locate the owner, appropriate it. As they discuss the possible reasons why the city has become empty, Jenai repeatedly attempts to contact her family in America to no avail. The power and water remain running, but the live television stations broadcast only test signals. Confused, Riley and Jenai return to the hotel after eating, finding no websites have been updated since yesterday.

Riley remains optimistic, and suggests they make the most of the situation. He leads them on a shopping spree, eventually filling up two SUVs with goods from the seemingly abandoned stores. He amuses himself by photographing Jenai at scenic locations and performing stunts. Jenai, however, begins sinking into depression, missing her old life. She is further frustrated when Riley injures himself during a reckless stunt, and she pressures him to promise not to put himself at any further risk. As their supplies grow scarcer, Jenai and Riley are forced to ration. Riley angers Jenai when he eats perishable food out of the agreed-upon order based on expiration date. He says he can simply farm for more food if necessary, but she insists they follow the agreement.

Seeing Jenai's poor mood, Riley attempts to cheer her by bringing her to the abandoned husk of an airplane he found. Riley calls it beautiful, but Jenai sees only a reminder of the dead world they now inhabit. After Jenai becomes overwhelmed by the decaying city, Riley suggests they go camping. Exploring a cabin, they come upon an old man named Nils. After they give him food and water, he explains that he left the city early on and returned to his cabin. Initially excited to find another survivor, Riley becomes frustrated with Nils' defeatist attitude. Nils tells Jenai about his home life: as a young man, he left his family for lengthy periods to make money as a fisherman. When he returned, he found they had changed. Jenai is disturbed when he says he did not protest this, as he believes it is useless to fight against God's will, which he says does not take humanity into consideration.

The next morning, Riley tells Jenai that Nils has died. Thinking back to his philosophy, she asks why they should even bother burying him. Riley insists on doing it because "it's what we do". After they return to the city, Jenai becomes obsessed with searching for more survivors. Riley suggests she is looking for answers where there are none and that they should instead be trying to make the best of their new life. Jenai excitedly opens an email waiting for her on their laptop but is crushed when it is revealed to be a picture from Riley, who is enthused about taking pictures of Iceland in a new season. Riley, when he returns home, becomes concerned when he finds a package of developed pictures left for him by Jenai. Looking all over for her, he finally finds her body floating in a geothermal pool, having apparently drowned herself. Riley initially attempts suicide but instead drives off, anguished, without burying her.

== Cast ==
- Maika Monroe as Jenai
- Matt O'Leary as Riley
- Arnar Jónsson as Nils
- Gunnar Helgason as Ivar
- Berglind Rós Sigurdardóttir as Tour Guide

== Release ==
Bokeh premiered at the Santa Barbara International Film Festival on February 3, 2017, and Screen Media Films released it in the United States on March 24. Cinedigm released it on DVD on April 25, 2017.

== Reception ==
Rotten Tomatoes, a review aggregator, reports that 43% of 21 surveyed critics gave the film a positive review; the average rating is 5/10. Metacritic rated it 56/100 based on nine reviews. Dennis Harvey of Variety called it a "a 'What if?' exercise that ultimately doesn't take its starting premise to any place that's terribly interesting". Writing in the Los Angeles Times, Sheri Linden called the film "admirably stripped-down", though she said it does not always live up to its interesting premise. She described the title, which references bokeh, a photographic effect in which backgrounds are blurred, as representing the different viewpoints of the main characters.

== See also ==
- In My Room
- The Wall
