= Oz Scott =

American director

- Born: Osborne Scott; September 16, 1949 (age 77); Hampton, Virginia, U.S.
- Occupations: Director, producer
- Years active: 1970s–present
- Children: 3
- Website: ozscott.com

Osborne Scott (born September 16, 1949) is an American television and film director and producer. He is most known for short film Mr. Boogedy.

== Life and career ==
Born in Hampton, Virginia, Scott attended NYU's Tisch School of the Arts and earned a MFA before he began his career in Washington D.C.'s Arena Stage. While at the Arena Stage, he managed the improvisational touring company The Living Stage. He then moved on to directing on and off Broadway plays including For Colored Girls Who Have Considered Suicide When the Rainbow Is Enuf, which earned him a Drama Desk Award in 1977, in 1982 he also directed a television version. In 1981, he directed his first feature film, Bustin' Loose. During the 1980s and 1990s, Scott directed several television series and television movies including Gimme a Break!, Scarecrow and Mrs. King, Crash Course, New Attitude, Civil Wars, American Gothic, Lois & Clark: The New Adventures of Superman, and Providence.

In 2002, Scott directed the VH1 television movie Play'd – A Hip Hop Story starring Rashaan Nall and Toni Braxton. The series went on to become VH1's highest rated program. The following year, Scott directed the Disney channel original movie The Cheetah Girls. Since directing The Cheetah Girls, Scott has gone on to direct episodes of Strong Medicine, Everybody Hates Chris, Boston Legal, The Unit, Medium, CSI: NY, and NCIS. In addition to directing, Scott also wrote episodes of The Jeffersons and served as supervising producer on two episodes of The District.

In 2008, Scott was named the associate artistic director of the Negro Ensemble Company where he was also named to the board of directors.

== Personal life ==
Scott lives in Sherman Oaks, California with his wife with whom he has three grown children.

== Selected filmography ==
=== Director ===
- Bustin' Loose (1981)
- American Playhouse (1982)
- Hill Street Blues (1983)
- Archie Bunker's Place (1983)
- Gimme a Break! (1983)
- Dreamland (1983)
- The Mississippi (1983)
- The Jeffersons (1983)
- Alice (1984)
- Scarecrow and Mrs. King (1984)
- 227 (1985)
- The Family Martinez (1986)
- He's the Mayor (1986)
- Fame (1986)
- Walt Disney anthology television series (1986)
- Hotel (1987)
- Crash Course (1988)
- Dirty Dancing (1988)
- The Robert Guillaume Show (1989)
- Class Cruise (1989)
- New Attitude (1990)
- The Cosby Show (1990)
- Civil Wars (1991)
- L.A. Law (1992)
- Picket Fences (1992)
- South of Sunset (1993)
- Johnny Bago (1993)
- Against the Grain (1993)
- The Byrds of Paradise (1994)
- Tears and Laughter: The Joan and Melissa Rivers Story (1994)
- Northern Exposure (1994)
- New York Undercover (1994)
- Chicago Hope (1994)
- Party of Five (1996)
- American Gothic (1996)
- Mr. & Mrs. Smith (1996)
- Lois & Clark: The New Adventures of Superman (1996)
- Diagnosis: Murder (1996)
- Leaving L.A. (1997)
- The Practice (1997)
- Spy Game (1998)
- Michael Hayes (1998)
- Timecop (1998)
- Any Day Now (1998)
- Providence (1999)
- Wonderland (2000)
- Spanish Judges (2000)
- Get Real (2000)
- Soul Food (2000)
- Family Law (2000)
- The District (2000)
- CSI: Crime Scene Investigation (2001)
- Ally McBeal (2001)
- The Guardian (2001)
- Play'd: A Hip Hop Story (2002)
- Lizzie McGuire (2002)
- Ed (2002)
- JAG (2002)
- American Dreams (2003)
- The Cheetah Girls (2003)
- Strong Medicine (2003)
- Clubhouse (2004)
- Dr. Vegas (2004)
- Kevin Hill (2005)
- The 4400 (2005)
- Boston Legal (2005)
- Threshold (2006)
- Pepper Dennis (2006)
- Just Legal (2006)
- Kidnapped (2006)
- Numbers (2006)
- Medium (2006)
- The Unit (2006)
- CSI: NY (2006)
- Psych (2007)
- NCIS (2008)
- Eureka (2008)
- Everybody Hates Chris (2009)
- The Forgotten (2009)
- 90210 (2010)
- CHAOS (2011)
- Home Run Showdown (2012)
- Are We There Yet? (2012)
- Unforgettable (2012)
- Blue Bloods (2013)
- Ironside (2013)
- Reed Between the Lines (2013)
- Star-Crossed (2014)
- The Tomorrow People (2014)
- NCIS: New Orleans (2014)
- Battle Creek (2015)
- The Messengers (2015)
- Dominion (2015)
- The Player (2015)
- Being Mary Jane (2015)
- Code Black (2015)
- Gotham (2015)
- Shadowhunters (2016)
- The Night Shift (2016–17)
- Scream (2016)
- Criminal Minds (2017)
- APB (2017)
- Black-ish (2017)
- Criminal Minds: Beyond Borders (2017)
- The Blacklist: Redemption (2017)
- Agents of S.H.I.E.L.D. (2017)
- Black Lightning (2018–20)
- Love Is... (2018)
- S.W.A.T. (2019–24)
- Agent Stoker (2021-26)
- All American: Homecoming (2022)
- Good Sam (2022)
- Law & Order: Organized Crime (2023)
- The Rookie: Feds (2023)
- Chicago P.D. (2023)
- Alert: Missing Persons Unit (2024)
- Crutch (2025)
- S.W.A.T. Exiles (2026)

=== Producer ===
- Walt Disney anthology television series (1987)
- The District (2003)
