= Spin Again =

1992 book

Spin Again was a 1992 book about vintage games that was coauthored by Rick Polizzi and Fred Schrader.
