= Spanish Judges =

- DVD cover
- Directed by: Oz Scott
- Written by: William Rehor
- Produced by: Betsy Chasse; Richard Mann; Matthew Lillard
- Starring: Matthew Lillard; Vincent D'Onofrio; Valeria Golino; Mark Boone Junior; Tamara Mello
- Edited by: Martin Hunter
- Music by: Harold Wheeler
- Distributed by: Collectors Film LLC
- Release date: October 16, 2000 (UK)
- Running time: 97 minutes
- Country: United States
- Language: English

Spanish Judges is 2000 direct-to-video crime drama film directed by Oz Scott and starring Matthew Lillard and Vincent D'Onofrio. In Australia, the film was released under the title Ruthless Behaviour.

== Plot ==
Jack (Lillard) is a con artist who sets out to enlist a couple to help him with a scam. Jack eventually meets up with two petty criminals, Max (D'Onofrio) and Jamie (Valeria Golino). Max is a small-time thief with high aspirations and low self-esteem, while Max's hot-tempered girlfriend Jamie collects poisons. After a game of cat and mouse, the couple agree to help with Jack in exchange for a piece of the action. Jack's scam involves recovering mysterious stolen merchandise, known as the Spanish Judges, and a briefcase containing a million dollars. With a buyer all lined up, Max and Jamie enlist their friend Piece (Mark Boone Junior), along with his girlfriend Mars Girl (Tamara Mello) for extra help. As the situation explodes, allegiances are tested and the slippery nature of the truth is finally revealed.

== Cast ==
- Matthew Lillard as Jack
- Vincent D'Onofrio as Max
- Valeria Golino as Jamie
- Mark Boone Junior as Piece
- Tamara Mello as Mars Girl
- David Glen Eisley as George
- Ed O'Ross as The Boss Man
- George Griffith as Griff
- Sam Hiona as Harry
- Dennis Keiffer as Lenny
- Rhino Michaels as Hitman 1
- Dale "Mad Dog" Messmer as Auctioneer
- J.W. Smith as Red
- Michael Shamus Wiles as Wellings
