= Back in the Game (2019 TV series) =

- Country of origin: United States
- No. of episodes: 4

Original release
- Network: CNBC
- Release: 6 November – 27 November 2019

Back in the Game is a 2019 television series on the American channel CNBC presented by Major League Baseball (MLB) star and businessman Alex Rodriguez. The four-episode series was scheduled on Wednesdays at 10 p.m. with the launching episode on CNBC on November 6, 2019. Rodriguez enlists the expertise of various entrepreneurs and experts to aid him in his endeavor.

== Beginnings ==
CNBC tried the concept initially in 2018 when it announced that it would launch Back in the Game by Alex Rodriguez on March 10, 2018, under the general Make It series. The initial episode for the pilot featured the NBA basketball player Joe Smith. But the series didn't materialize in 2018 except for that episode. It was relaunched in 2019 with the initial episode to be broadcast on November 6, 2019.

== Featured personalities ==
The featured persons on the series are:

- Evander Holyfield - American heavyweight boxing champion (Episode 1, 6 November 2019)
- Ryan Lochte - American swimmer and Olympian (Episode 2, 13 November 2019)
- Brian Dunkleman - former American Idol host (Episode 3, 20 November 2019)
- Nicole Eggert - American actress (Episode 4, 27 November 2019)

== Premise ==
Rodriguez mentors four various athletes and entertainers who have fallen on hard times and need help getting back on their feet by motivating them to build up self-esteem and advising them to reduce their debt, repair their reputations, and launch new business careers and get them back on path of financial stability.

== Production ==
Back in the Game is produced by SMAC Productions and Machete Productions with Amber Mazzola, Alex Rodriguez, Michael Strahan, Constance Schwartz-Morini and Elizabeth Jones as executive producers and Marshall Eisen, the executive producer for CNBC.
