= KL Going =

American writer

- Born: Kelly Louise Going; August 21, 1973 (age 53); Rhinebeck, New York, U.S.
- Occupation: Writer
- Spouse: Dustin Adams
- Children: Ashton Paul
- Parent(s): William and Linda Going
- Writing career
- Period: 1973–present
- Genres: Fiction for children and young adults (YA fiction)
- Subject: author
- Notable awards: Michael L. Printz Award (Honor Book)
- Website: klgoing.com

KL Going (born August 21, 1973) is an American writer of books for children and teens.

Her first novel, Fat Kid Rules the World, was named a Michael L. Printz Award Honor Book by the American Library Association, and was included on the Young Adult Library Services Association's Best Books for Young Adults list and its list of Best Books for the Past Decade.

Her books have been Booksense picks, Scholastic Book Club choices, Junior Library Guild selections, New York Public Library Best Books for the Teenage, and winners of state book awards. They have been featured by Publishers Weekly, School Library Journal, Kirkus Reviews, and the Children's Book Council as best books of the year.

Her work has also been published in Korea, Italy, Japan, Germany, Spain, and the United Kingdom, and her novel Fat Kid Rules the World was adapted into a film. It premiered at the SXSW Film Festival and won an Audience Award.

Going began her career working at Curtis Brown, Ltd., one of the oldest literary agencies in New York City. She used this inner knowledge of publishing to write Writing and Selling the Young Adult Novel – a how-to book for aspiring writers, published by Writer's Digest. She has also written short stories for several anthologies and multiple picture books.

== Early life and education ==
She was born Kelly Louise Going in Rhinebeck, New York.

== Career ==
After graduation, she did volunteer service with the Mennonite Central Committee in New Orleans, Louisiana, teaching adult literacy. When she returned to New York she began working in publishing for the literary agency, Curtis Brown, Ltd.

After her first novel, Fat Kid Rules the World, was published she left the agency to write part-time. In addition to writing, she managed an independent bookstore in Cold Spring, New York, for the Merritt Bookstore.

Going has published three young adult novels, plus three novels for middle grade readers age eight to twelve, a picture book, and a reference book titled Writing and Selling the YA Novel published by Writer's Digest.

She has additional picture books and novels under contract. Going's books have been published by Penguin Random House, Houghton Mifflin Harcourt, Simon & Schuster, and Writer's Digest and have won many awards and honors. Her books have been produced as audio books, made into a feature film, and the rights have been optioned for television and Broadway theatre. She has also written short stories for several anthologies, including Rush Hour Volume 3, Full House, and No Such Thing as the Real World.

In addition to her writing, Going also teaches workshops for the Highlights Foundation, speaks at schools and libraries around the country, participates in Skype visits with schools around the world, and teaches language arts part-time at the Homestead School, a private school in upstate New York.

=== Young-adult fiction ===
- Fat Kid Rules the World (2003) tells the story of a 296-pound teenager, Troy, who is befriended by local guitar legend Curt MacCrae. Curt insists they form a band and Troy will be their drummer, only Troy does not know how to play the drums.
- Saint Iggy (2006) is the story of Iggy Corso who is kicked out of school for allegedly threatening a teacher. He finds himself seeking to do something good in order to change others' minds about him.
- King of the Screw Ups (2009) is the humorous tale of Liam Gellar who is kicked out of his home and forced to move in with his glam-rocking, cross-dressing uncle. Determined to get back in his father's good graces, Liam resolves to do better in school and not fall prey to the insidious popularity that has continuously been his downfall. However, even when he tries to screw up, he screws up.

=== Middle-grade fiction ===
- The Liberation of Gabriel King (2005) is a historical fiction novel set in 1976 about Gabriel King and his best friend Frita Wilson who set out to conquer all their fears over the course of one summer.
- The Garden of Eve (2007) is a novel mixing magic with real life to create a story exploring grief, healing, and growth.
- Pieces of Why (2016) After a shooting in her neighborhood, Tia seeks the truth about the crime that sent her father to prison years ago.

=== Picture books ===
- Dog in Charge (2012) – Find out what happens when Dog is left in charge of five wily cats.
- Pablo the Poet (publishing date unknown) – Explores how the poetry of Pablo Neruda made the ordinary extraordinary.
- Bumpety, Dunkety, Thumpety-Thump (2017) – Rhythm, sounds, and fun!
- Can't Stop Kissing That Baby (publishing date unknown) – Moms around the world sure love their babies!
- The Shape of the World (2017) – Inspired by the life of architect Frank Lloyd Wright, this book looks at how the world around us is made up of many shapes.

=== Film adaptation ===
Fat Kid Rules the World was screened at South by Southwest, winning the Audience Award for Narrative Spotlight. Actor Matthew Lillard directed the film. The script was written by Michael Galvin and Peter Speakman. The film stars Jacob Wysocki as the title character. The film was scored by Mike McCready of Pearl Jam and shot on location in Seattle, Washington.
