= Mom's Got a Date with a Vampire =

2000 television film directed by Steve Boyum

- Promotional advertisement
- Teleplay by: Robert Keats
- Story by: Lindsay Naythons
- Directed by: Steve Boyum
- Starring: Caroline Rhea; Matthew O'Leary; Robert Carradine; Laura Vandervoort; Myles Jeffrey; Charles Shaughnessy
- Theme music composer: Christopher Brady
- Country of origin: United States
- Original language: English

Production
- Producers: Don Schain, Michael J Nathanson, Clifford Alsberg, Bettina Viviano
- Cinematography: Michael Storey
- Editor: Alan Cody
- Running time: 85 minutes
- Production company: Upstart Entertainment

Original release
- Network: Disney Channel
- Release: October 13, 2000

Mom's Got a Date with a Vampire is a 2000 American made-for-television horror comedy film directed by Steve Boyum and starring Caroline Rhea, Matt O'Leary, Charles Shaughnessy, Laura Vandervoort, and Robert Carradine. It aired as a Disney Channel Original Movie, premiering on the Disney Channel on Friday, October 13, 2000.

== Plot ==
13-year-old Adam Hansen (Matthew O'Leary) and his best friend Duffy (Jake Epstein) have tickets for a concert, and his 16-year-old sister Chelsea (Laura Vandervoort) has a date with her dreamy boyfriend Peter. Because Adam hasn't done his homework, instead making up a story using an article from the magazine The Weekly Secret, and because Chelsea calls Adam a dweeb, their mother Lynette (Caroline Rhea) grounds them both. Chelsea and Adam will do whatever it takes to get their mother out of the house, so they set her up on a date with a mysterious man named Dimitri (Charles Shaughnessy). Everything seems to go according to plan, until their 8-year-old little brother Taylor (Myles Jeffrey) sees Dimitri turn into a bat, and realizes that he's a vampire.

His brother and sister do not believe Taylor, so he calls Malachi Van Helsing (Robert Carradine), the vampire hunter. The night that their mother goes out with Dimitri, Taylor follows them. Not wanting their mother to come home and extend their punishments, Chelsea and Adam follow Taylor. Adam realizes Taylor's hunch about Dimitri was right when he looks in the mirror and notices Dimitri does not have a reflection. Along with Chelsea, he sets out to stop Dimitri, who puts their mother in a trance and plans to take her to his mansion. Meanwhile, Malachi Van Helsing arrives and begins to hunt down Dimitri, only to discover that he was being followed by Taylor.

Dimitri goes to bite a powerless Adam, but he and Chelsea call out to Lynette, breaking her trance (as only true love can break a vampire's thrall). She throws Dimitri into his coffin. Van Helsing seals it with silver-plated nails and explains that he plans to send it to Finland, a place where it's always sunny. Van Helsing asks their mother out on a date. They all go back to the Hansen house for breakfast as the sun is finally rising.

== Cast ==
- Caroline Rhea as Lynette Hansen, the strict no nonsense divorced mother of Chelsea, Adam, and Taylor. Lynette is overprotective of Taylor.
- Matthew O'Leary as Adam Hansen, the 13-year-old protagonist. The lazy middle child of the family.
- Robert Carradine as Malachi Van Helsing. The vampire hunter.
- Laura Vandervoort as Chelsea Hansen, the second 16-year-old protagonist. The eldest child of the family.
- Myles Jeffrey as Taylor Hansen, the third 8-year-old protagonist. The youngest of the family.
- Charles Shaughnessy as Dimitri Denatos, the evil vampire of the film.
- Jake Epstein as Duffy, Adam's best friend.
- J. Adam Brown as "Boomer", A boy who likes Chelsea.

== See also ==
- Vampire film
