= Tamara Mello =

American actress (born 1976)

- Born: Tamara Beccam Mello
- Occupation: Actress
- Years active: 1993–present
- Spouse: Paolo Cascardo (m. 2003)
- Children: 1

Tamara Beccam Mello (born 1976) is an American actress.

== Career ==
Her career began in 1993 with appearances on various television programs and films. She has appeared in the TV series 7th Heaven, Boy Meets World, and Diagnosis: Murder and in the films The Brady Bunch Movie and She's All That.

In 1999, she appeared in the TV series Popular as Lily, the politically correct vegetarian. Following two seasons on Popular, Mello continued to work in theater, film and television before taking several years off to raise her daughter. She returned to acting and worked sporadically, limited to mainly guest appearances on television shows such as the pilot for the comedy Worst Week and a 2013 episode of The Mentalist. She now lives in Los Angeles. In 2009, she appeared in T-Mobile Blackberry Pearl Flip television commercials alongside Danny Pudi campaigning against "butt-dialing".

== Filmography ==
=== Film ===
Year	Title	Role	Notes
1993	The Making of '...And God Spoke'	Dial S Woman	
1995	The Brady Bunch Movie	Stacy	
1995	Tom and Huck	Townspeople	
1996	Scorpion Spring	Girl in Alley	
1997	Infidelity/Hard Fall	Lola	
1997	The Beautician and the Beast	Consuela	
1998	Get a Job	Rachel/Con Artist	
1998	Overnight Delivery	Marita	
1999	Carlo's Wake	Gwen Brock	
1999	She's All That	Chandler	
2000	Spanish Judges	Mars Girl	
2000	Rave	Nette	
2001	Tortilla Soup	Maribel Naranjo	
2002	Scream at the Sound of the Beep	Tori	
2004	Clean	Audrey	

=== Television ===
Year	Title	Role	Notes
1996	7th Heaven	Tia Jackson	Episode: "Now You See Me"
1997	Diagnosis Murder	Maria Moreno	Episode: "Blood Brothers Murder"
1997	Boy Meets World	Sherri	Episode: "Cult Fiction"
1997–1998	Nothing Sacred	Rachel	20 episodes
1999	Zoe	Angela	Episode: "Everything You Wanted to Know About Zoe"
1999–2001	Popular	Lily Esposito	43 episodes
2002	Miss Miami		TV movie
2003	The Law and Mr. Lee	Toni Delgado	TV movie
2004	JAG	Elisa Cumpeano	Episode: "Good Intentions"
2004	Strong Medicine	Dr. Burke	Episode: "Life in the Balance"
2004	Hawaii		Episode: "Almost Paradise"
2004	What I Like About You	Nikki	Episode: "We'll Miss Gittle a Little"
2007	Psych	Amanda	Episode: "From the Earth to Starbucks"
2008	Worst Week	Nicky	Episode: "Pilot"
2013	The Mentalist	Lily Soto	Episode: "Red Letter Day"
