= Matthew Lillard =

American actor and director (born 1970)

- Lillard in 2026
- Born: Matthew Lyn Lillard; January 24, 1970 (age 56); Lansing, Michigan, U.S.
- Occupations: Actor; director; producer
- Years active: 1990–present
- Spouse: Heather Helm (m. 2000)

Matthew Lyn Lillard (born January 24, 1970) is an American actor, director, and producer. His early film roles include the black comedy Serial Mom (1994) and the crime thriller Hackers (1995). He achieved a career breakthrough for his portrayal of Stu Macher in the slasher film Scream (1996), which bolstered Lillard into the mainstream. Afterwards, he starred in prominent roles in SLC Punk! (1998), She's All That (1999), Thirteen Ghosts (2001), and Without a Paddle (2004).

Lillard portrayed Norville "Shaggy" Rogers in the live-action movies Scooby-Doo (2002) and Scooby-Doo 2: Monsters Unleashed (2004), and became the official animated voice of the character following Casey Kasem's retirement from the role in 2009. Starting in the 2010s, he was frequently cast in dramatic roles in films such as The Descendants (2011), Trouble with the Curve (2012), Match (2014), and Twin Peaks: The Return (2017). He also starred in the NBC series Good Girls (2018–2021).

Lillard gained renewed recognition in the 2020s for playing William Afton in the horror film Five Nights at Freddy's (2023) and its 2025 sequel. He has since starred in the film The Life of Chuck (2025) the Disney+ series Daredevil: Born Again (2026), and the Amazon Prime series Carrie, based on the Stephen King novel (2026).

== Early life ==
Lillard was born in Lansing, Michigan, on January 24, 1970, the son of Paula and Jeffrey Lillard (b. 1948), and grew up in Tustin, California. He has a younger sister, and attended Foothill High School in North Tustin, California. He later attended Fullerton College and then went to the American Academy of Dramatic Arts in Pasadena, California, with fellow actor Paul Rudd. He also attended Circle in the Square Theatre School in New York City.

== Career ==
After high school, Lillard was co-host of a short-lived TV show titled SK8-TV, and afterwards was hired as an extra in Ghoulies 3: Ghoulies Go to College (1991). In 1994, he was cast in the John Waters black comedy Serial Mom. The following year he was cast in five films, including Hackers, a thriller about a group of high school kids who thwart a multimillion-dollar corporate extortion conspiracy. In 1996, he was cast in his breakthrough role as Stu Macher in the horror film Scream. He was originally meant to reprise his role in 2000's Scream 3 but the plans were changed. He also played Stevo in the independent film SLC Punk! (1998), Jack Fisher in Spanish Judges (1999), Brock Hudson in She's All That (1999), and supporting character Dennis Rafkin in Thirteen Ghosts (2001).

Lillard was cast as Norville "Shaggy" Rogers in the 2002 live-action film Scooby-Doo, a role he later reprised in the 2004 sequel Scooby-Doo 2: Monsters Unleashed. When Casey Kasem, who had voiced the character from the show's debut in 1969, retired in 2009, Lillard was chosen to take over and voice Shaggy in the three subsequent animated series, Mystery Incorporated, Be Cool Scooby-Doo!, and Scooby-Doo and Guess Who?, as well as every animated direct-to-video film since 2010's Scooby-Doo! Abracadabra-Doo. He also reprised the voice role of Shaggy in the crossover episode in the television series Supernatural in 2018. Lillard, however, did not voice Shaggy in the animated Scooby-Doo reboot Scoob!, with the character instead being voiced by SNL alum Will Forte. Although Lillard was disappointed with the casting decision, he still wished the film good luck.

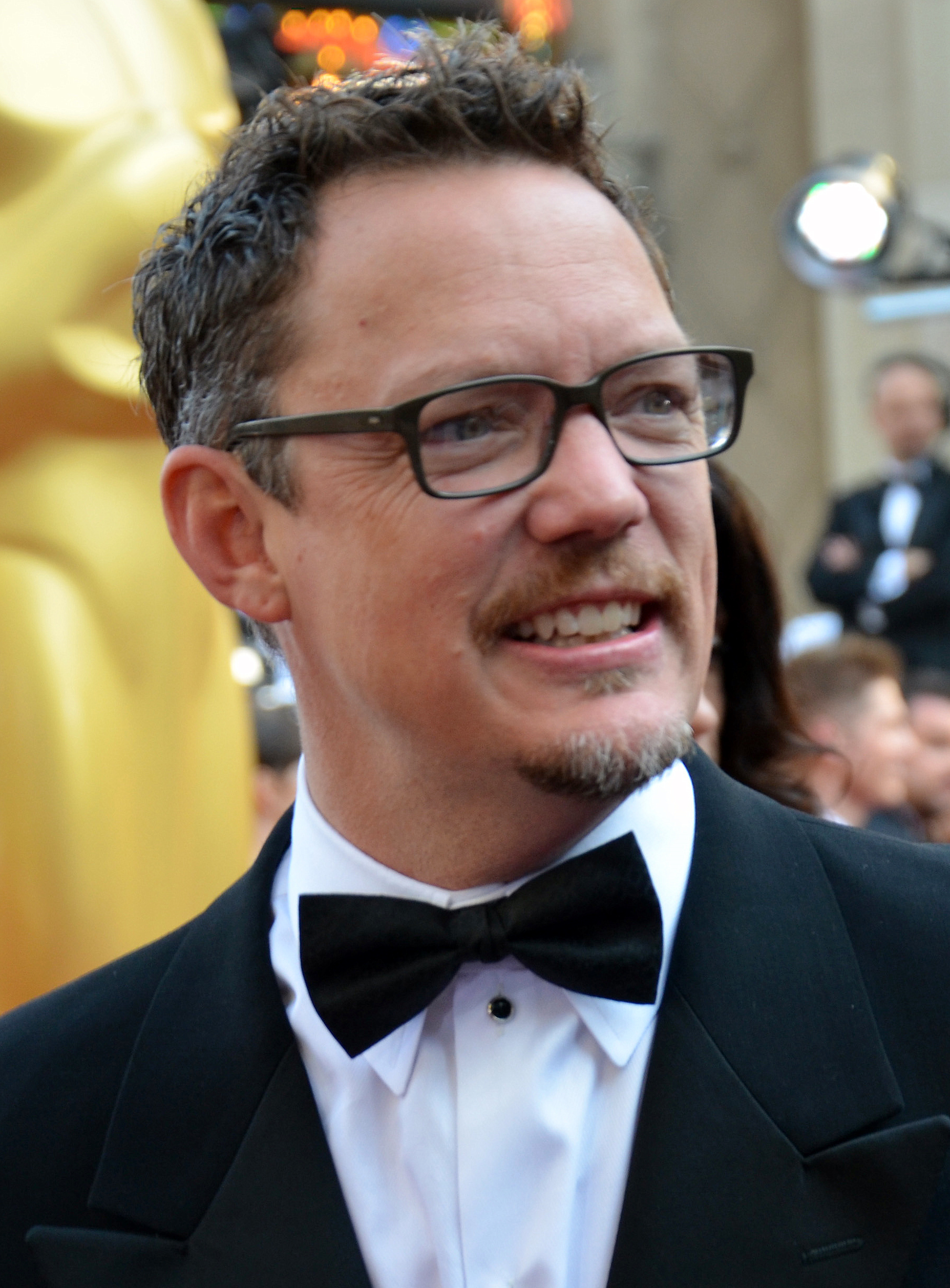
Lillard at the 84th Academy Awards in 2012

In 2004, Lillard starred in the comedy film Without a Paddle. In 2009, he directed the short film Come Home Soon.

In 2011, Lillard guest starred on the Fox series House. Also in 2011, he produced and directed his first feature film, Fat Kid Rules the World, based on the K. L. Going book of the same name. Later that year, he appeared in the comedy-drama film The Descendants. He also starred in the sports drama Trouble with the Curve (2012) and the drama Match (2014).

In 2012, Lillard guest-starred in the Criminal Minds episode "The Apprenticeship". The following year, he played the role of Daniel Frye on the American TV series The Bridge. In 2014, he starred as Peter in the animated film Under Wraps, alongside Brooke Shields and Drake Bell. In 2016, Lillard landed the recurring role of FBI undercover agent Luke Goshen in the Amazon Series, Bosch. In 2017, he starred as William Hastings in the third season of Twin Peaks. The next year, he began co-starring as Dean Boland on the NBC series Good Girls.

In 2023, Lillard starred in the live-action movie adaptation of the Five Nights at Freddy's video game series. He gained renewed recognition for his role as William Afton, a manipulative serial killer. U.S. entertainment publication The Hollywood Reporter stated that he had entered "his Renaissance era" in popular culture, noting that the movie had the third highest ever domestic box office return for a horror film during its opening weekend. Lillard has credited his children as inspiring him both to take on the role and to give a dominating, assertive performance as the franchise's overarching villain. He reprised his role in the 2025 sequel.

In an interview, Lillard elaborated,

"The hard part about playing this part is the pressure I put on myself to honor the fans, to deliver a great performance in an iconic role. There are millions of kids worldwide, and people that started playing as kids and are now adults, that have an expectation that this film will deliver on a really great level. So, being this iconic bad guy, the amount of pressure I put on myself to not suck is pretty extraordinary. That’s the hardest part."

In 2024, Lillard appeared in filmmaker Mike Flanagan's film The Life of Chuck. In 2026, Lillard reprised his role as Stuart "Stu" Macher in Scream 7. He also starred in the second season of the Marvel Cinematic Universe (MCU) television series Daredevil: Born Again.

== Other ventures ==
Lillard was one of the co-founders of Beadle and Grimm's, a company that publishes licensed expanded products, usually of a limited edition, from Wizards of the Coast games including Dungeons and Dragons and Magic: The Gathering.

Lillard co-founded the company Find Familiar Spirits, which develops and sells specialized alcoholic beverages.

In 2022, it was announced that Lillard, along with writer and director Bill Whirity, had launched a non-fungible token (NFT)-based project called Midnite Movie Club, which lets holders participate in a first-of-its-kind "Decentralized Movie Studio". The first film to come from the company will be a vampire movie called Let Them Die.

== Personal life ==
Lillard is married to Heather Helm and lives in Los Angeles. Lillard's family has shaped how he addresses politics and current events: in 2026, he commented, "For me, I have queer kids. If I'm not standing up for queer kids or kids in the trans community, then what the fuck am I doing?"

In October 2005, he participated in a Dungeons & Dragons tournament, against members of the Quest Club Gaming Organization, at the Magic Castle in Hollywood, California. Lillard has also played Dungeons & Dragons with the online series Dice, Camera, Action with Christopher Perkins as the Dungeon Master; as well as with the Critical Role cast at a special one-shot with Sam Riegel as the Dungeon Master.

After returning in Scream 7, Lillard admitted that he felt "ashamed" for returning to the franchise after his would-be co-star Melissa Barrera was fired from the entry for her criticism of Israel's actions in Gaza. As Lillard reflected, "I was so excited to go back, I didn't really think about Melissa and that journey. I didn't say no." Lillard admitted to feeling "embarrassed" for his decision and concluded that "I blew that. I'm on the wrong side of history for that. I still like being in the movie [but] it may not have been the best idea."

== Filmography ==
Key
†	Denotes films that have not yet been released

=== Film ===
Year	Title	Role	Notes	Ref(s)
1991	Ghoulies III: Ghoulies Go to College	Dexter Stork	Credited as Matthew Lynn	
1994	Serial Mom	Chip Sutphin		
1995	Animal Room	Doug Van Housen		
1995	Mad Love	Eric Webber		
1995	Hackers	Emmanuel "Cereal Killer" Goldstein		
1995	Tarantella	Matt Reynolds		
1996	Scream	Stuart "Stu" Macher		
1997	Scream 2	Guy at Party	Uncredited extra	
1998	The Curve	Tim		
1998	Senseless	Tim LaFlour		
1998	Telling You	Adam Ginesberg		
1998	Without Limits	Roscoe Devine		
1998	SLC Punk!	Steven "Stevo" Levy		
1999	Spanish Judges	Jack Fisher		
1999	She's All That	Brock Hudson		
1999	Wing Commander	Lt. Todd "Maniac" Marshall		
2000	Love's Labour's Lost	Longaville		
2000	Dish Dogs	Jason		
2001	Finder's Fee	Fishman		
2001	Triangle Square	Snake Eater		
2001	Summer Catch	Billy Brubaker		
2001	Thirteen Ghosts	Dennis Rafkin		
2002	Scooby-Doo	Norville "Shaggy" Rogers		
2003	Looney Tunes: Back in Action	Himself	Cameo	
2004	The Perfect Score	Larry		
2004	Scooby-Doo 2: Monsters Unleashed	Norville "Shaggy" Rogers		
2004	Wicker Park	Luke Stanford		
2004	Without a Paddle	Jerry Conlaine		
2005	Karas: The Prophecy	Eko	Voice	
2006	Bickford Shmeckler's Cool Ideas	Spaceman		
2006	The Groomsmen	Desmond "Dez" Howard		
2007	In the Name of the King: A Dungeon Siege Tale	Duke Fallow		
2007	What Love Is	Sal		
2007	One of Our Own	Bob	Also co-producer	
2007	Karas: The Revelation	Eko	Voice	
2008	Spooner	Herman Spooner	Also co-producer	
2008	Extreme Movie	Himself		
2009	Messages Deleted	Joel Brandt		
2009	Osh Kosh B'Gosh: Under the Overall	Lloyd B'Gosh	Short film	
2009	All's Faire in Love	Crocket		
2009	Endless Bummer	Mike Mooney		
2010	Scooby-Doo! Abracadabra-Doo	Norville "Shaggy" Rogers	Voice	
2010	Scooby-Doo! Camp Scare	Norville "Shaggy" Rogers	Voice	
2011	Scooby-Doo! Legend of the Phantosaur	Norville "Shaggy" Rogers / Shaky Joe	Voice	
2011	From the Head	Jimmy		
2011	The Descendants	Brian Speer		
2011	The Pool Boys	Roger		
2011	Still Screaming: The Ultimate Scary Movie Retrospective	Himself	Documentary film	
2012	Scooby-Doo! Music of the Vampire	Norville "Shaggy" Rogers	Voice	
2012	Home Run Showdown	Joey		
2012	Trouble with the Curve	Phillip Sanderson		
2012	Big Top Scooby-Doo!	Norville "Shaggy" Rogers	Voice	
2012	Deep Dark Canyon	Jack Cavanaugh		
2012	Fat Kid Rules the World	Guidance Counselor	Also director and producer	
2012	Dear Dracula	Mailman Gus	Voice	
2012	Abominable Christmas	Dogcatcher / Al / Passerby	Voice	
2013	Scooby-Doo! Mask of the Blue Falcon	Norville "Shaggy" Rogers	Voice	
2013	Scooby-Doo! Adventures: The Mystery Map	Norville "Shaggy" Rogers	Voice	
2013	Return to Nim's Island	Jack Rusoe		
2013	Scooby-Doo! Stage Fright	Norville "Shaggy" Rogers	Voice	
2013	The Naughty List	Tinsel / Neighbor Reindeer / Evergreen	Voice	
2014	Match	Mike		
2014	Scooby-Doo! WrestleMania Mystery	Norville "Shaggy" Rogers	Voice	
2014	Axel: The Biggest Little Hero	The Lizard King	Voice	
2014	Scooby-Doo! Frankencreepy	Norville "Shaggy" Rogers	Voice	
2014	Under Wraps	Peter	Voice	
2015	Bloodsucking Bastards	Phallicyte Executive	Uncredited Cameo	
2015	Scooby-Doo! Moon Monster Madness	Norville "Shaggy" Rogers	Voice	
2015	Scooby-Doo! and Kiss: Rock and Roll Mystery	Norville "Shaggy" Rogers	Voice	
2016	Lego Scooby-Doo! Haunted Hollywood	Norville "Shaggy" Rogers	Voice	
2016	Scooby-Doo! and WWE: Curse of the Speed Demon	Norville "Shaggy" Rogers	Voice	
2016	Six LA Love Stories	Alan Mackey		
2017	Scooby-Doo! Shaggy's Showdown	Norville "Shaggy" Rogers	Voice	
2017	Lego Scooby-Doo! Blowout Beach Bash	Norville "Shaggy" Rogers	Voice	
2018	Scooby-Doo! & Batman: The Brave and the Bold	Norville "Shaggy" Rogers	Voice	
2018	Scooby-Doo! and the Gourmet Ghost	Norville "Shaggy" Rogers	Voice	
2019	Scooby-Doo! and the Curse of the 13th Ghost	Norville "Shaggy" Rogers	Voice	
2019	Scooby-Doo! Return to Zombie Island	Norville "Shaggy" Rogers	Voice	
2020	Happy Halloween, Scooby-Doo!	Norville "Shaggy" Rogers	Voice	
2021	Scooby-Doo! The Sword and the Scoob	Norville "Shaggy" Rogers	Voice	
2021	He's All That	Principal Bosch		
2021	Mortal Kombat Legends: Battle of the Realms	Norville "Shaggy" Rogers	Voice cameo	
2021	Straight Outta Nowhere: Scooby-Doo! Meets Courage the Cowardly Dog	Norville "Shaggy" Rogers	Voice	
2022	Scream	Stab 8 Flamethrower Ghostface, Party Guest	Voice cameos; also "special thanks"	
2022	Trick or Treat Scooby-Doo!	Norville "Shaggy" Rogers / Craggly / Captain Cutler	Voice	
2023	Scooby-Doo! and Krypto, Too!	Norville "Shaggy" Rogers	Voice	
2023	Five Nights at Freddy's	Steve Raglan / William Afton		
2024	The Life of Chuck	Gus Wilfong		
2025	Five Nights at Freddy's 2	William Afton / Springtrap		
2026	Scream 7	Stuart "Stu" Macher		
2026	Behemoth!	Dennis Glenn		
2027	Anything but Ghosts †	TBA	Post-production	
2027	Man of Tomorrow †	TBA	Post-production	
TBA	Rot †	TBA	Pre-production	

=== Television ===
Year	Title	Role	Notes	Ref(s)
1990	SK8-TV	Himself (Host - Presenter)	13 episodes	
1994	Vanishing Son IV	Dawson	Television film	
1996	If These Walls Could Talk	Abortion Protester	Segment: "1996"	
1997	The Devil's Child	Tim	Television film	
1997	Nash Bridges	Brian Van Pelt	Episode: "Gun Play"	
2002	It's a Very Merry Muppet Christmas Movie	Luc Fromage - character	Television film	
2003	All That	Himself / Hairdresser	Episode: "Matthew Lillard / O-Town"	
2005, 2021	American Dad!	Mars / Bruce	Voices; 2 episodes	
2005–2022	Robot Chicken	Norville "Shaggy" Rogers / Various roles	Voices; 9 episodes	
2006	The Replacements	Trevor Bodie	Voice; 2 episodes	
2006	13 Graves	Matthew McQueen	Television film	
2006	Eloise: The Animated Series	Monsieur Maurice Ducat	Voice; episode: "Little Miss Christmas"	
2007	Area 57	Col. Steven Isaac	Unaired pilot	
2008	Gary Unmarried	Taylor	Episode: "Gary's Ex-Brother-In-Law"	
2009	Law & Order: Special Victims Unit	Chet	Episode: "Ballerina"	
2009	Married Not Dead	Rob	Unaired pilot	
2010–2013	Scooby-Doo! Mystery Incorporated	Norville "Shaggy" Rogers	Voice; 52 episodes	
2011	House	Jack	Episode: "Larger Than Life"	
2011	Generator Rex	Surge	Voice; episode: "Waste Land"	
2011	Batman: The Brave and the Bold	Norville "Shaggy" Rogers	Voice; episode: "Bat-Mite Presents: Batman's Strangest Cases!"	
2011	Scream: The Inside Story	Himself	Documentary film	
2011–2013	Mad	Norville "Shaggy" Rogers / Various roles	Voice; 2 episodes	
2012	Samurai! Daycare	Ned	Voice; 9 episodes	
2012	Leverage	Gabe Erickson	Episode: "The Real Fake Car Job"	
2012	Scooby-Doo! Spooky Games	Norville "Shaggy" Rogers	Voice; television special	
2012	Criminal Minds	David Roy Turner	Episode: "The Apprenticeship"	
2012	Scooby-Doo! Haunted Holidays	Norville "Shaggy" Rogers	Voice; television special	
2013	I Am Victor	Elliot Moe	Unaired pilot	
2013	Scooby-Doo! and the Spooky Scarecrow	Norville "Shaggy" Rogers	Voice; television special	
2013	Scooby-Doo! Mecha Mutt Menace	Norville "Shaggy" Rogers	Voice; television special	
2013	A Monsterous Holiday	Gus	Voice; television short film	
2013–2014	The Bridge	Daniel Frye	24 episodes	
2013–2014	Beware the Batman	Dr. Jason Burr	Voice; 4 episodes	
2014	Scooby-Doo! Ghastly Goals	Norville "Shaggy" Rogers	Voice; television special	
2014, 2016	The Good Wife	Rowby Canton	2 episodes	
2015	State of Affairs	CIA Director DD Banks	3 episodes	
2015	Scooby-Doo! and the Beach Beastie	Norville "Shaggy" Rogers	Voice; television special	
2015	Lego Scooby-Doo! Knight Time Terror	Norville "Shaggy" Rogers	Voice; television special	
2015–2016	Scooby-Doo! Lego Shorts	Norville "Shaggy" Rogers	Voice; web shorts	
2015–2018	Be Cool, Scooby-Doo!	Norville "Shaggy" Rogers	Voice; 52 episodes	
2016–2017, 2021	Bosch	Luke 'Lucky' Rykov	8 episodes	
2016	Halt and Catch Fire	Ken Diebold	4 episodes	
2017	All Hail King Julien	Ned	Voice; 2 episodes	
2017	Twin Peaks	William Hastings	4 episodes	
2018	Halfway There	Jimmy Bishop	Pilot	
2018	Supernatural	Norville "Shaggy" Rogers	Voice; episode: "Scoobynatural"	
2018–2021	Good Girls	Dean Boland	34 episodes	
2019	FBI	Thomas Gillman / Venutti	Episode: "Most Wanted"	
2019, 2023	Teen Titans Go!	Norville "Shaggy" Rogers	Voice; 2 Episodes	
2019–2021	Scooby-Doo and Guess Who?	Norville "Shaggy" Rogers / Various roles	Voice; 52 episodes	
2020	Barkskins	Gus Lafarge	3 episodes	
2021	Scooby-Doo, Where Are You Now!	Norville "Shaggy" Rogers / Himself	Voice; Television special	
2022	Billions	Ron Chestnut	Episode: "Johnny Favorite"	
2023	True Lies	Nathan "The Wolf"	Episode: "Rival Companions"	
2023	The Boulet Brothers' Dragula	Himself (judge)	Episode: "Children of the Can"	
2024	Jellystone!	Norville "Shaggy" Rogers	Voice; episode: "Frankenhooky"	
2024	Killer Cakes	Himself (host)	2 episodes	
2024–2025	Scariest House in America	Himself	'Ghostface' voice	
2025	Robot Chicken: Self Discovery Special	Norville "Shaggy" Rogers	Voice; television special	
2026	Cross	Lance	8 episodes	
2026–2027	Daredevil: Born Again	Mr. Charles / Mr. Robertson	5 episodes	
2026	Carrie	Principal Henry Grayle	Main role; 7 episodes (season 1)	
2027	Yokoso Scooby-Doo! †	Norville "Shaggy" Rogers	Voice	

=== Video games ===
Year	Title	Role	Notes	Ref(s)
2002	Sled Storm	A.J. Rollins		
2004	Scooby-Doo 2: Monsters Unleashed – The Video Game	Norville "Shaggy" Rogers		
2010	Scooby-Doo! and the Spooky Swamp	Norville "Shaggy" Rogers		
2014	Scooby-Doo & Looney Tunes Cartoon Universe: Adventure	Norville "Shaggy" Rogers		
2015	My Friend Scooby-Doo!	Norville "Shaggy" Rogers		
2015	Lego Dimensions	Norville "Shaggy" Rogers		
2018	Scooby-Doo! Mystery Cases	Norville "Shaggy" Rogers		
2022	MultiVersus	Norville "Shaggy" Rogers		
2025	Dead by Daylight	William Afton / Springtrap (Yellow Rabbit Outfit)	Five Nights at Freddy's DLC	

=== Music videos ===
Year	Title	Artist	Role	Notes	Ref(s)
2002	"Land of a Million Drums"	OutKast featuring Killer Mike and Sleepy Brown	Norville "Shaggy" Rogers		
2004	"Don't Wanna Think About You" (Original and Director's Cut versions)	Simple Plan	Norville "Shaggy" Rogers	Cameo	
2025	"The Laugh Track"	Ice Nine Kills	Himself		

== Awards and nominations ==
Year	Title	Association	Category	Result	Ref.
1999	SLC Punk!	Mar del Plata Film Festival	Best Actor	Won	
2002	Scooby-Doo	Teen Choice Award	Choice Movie Actor – Comedy	Nominated	
2003	Scooby-Doo	Nickelodeon Kid's Choice Award	Favorite part in a Movie	Won	
2011	The Descendants	Gotham Award	Best Ensemble Performance	Nominated	
2011	The Descendants	Southeastern Film Critics Association Award	Best Ensemble	Nominated	
2012	Scooby-Doo! Legend of the Phantosaur	Behind the Voice Actors Award	Best Vocal Ensemble in a Television Special/Direct-to-DVD Title or Short	Nominated	
2012	The Descendants	Central Ohio Film Critics Association Award	Best Ensemble	Nominated	
2012	Fat Kid Rules the World	Oldenburg Film Festival	German Independence Award – Audience Award	Nominated	
2012	The Descendants	Screen Actors Guild Award	Outstanding Performance by a Cast in a Motion Picture	Nominated	
2012	Fat Kid Rules the World	SXSW Film Festival	Narrative Spotlight	Won	
2013	Scooby-Doo! Mystery Incorporated	Behind the Voice Actors Award	Best Vocal Ensemble in a Television Series – Comedy/Musical	Nominated	
2013	Fat Kid Rules the World	Zlin International Film Festival for Children and Youth	Best Feature Film for Youth – Children's Jury Main Prize	Nominated	
2013	Fat Kid Rules the World	Zlin International Film Festival for Children and Youth	Best Feature Film for Youth – Golden Slipper	Nominated	
2014	Scooby-Doo! Mask of the Blue Falcon	Behind the Voice Actors Award	Best Vocal Ensemble in a Television Special/Direct-to-DVD Title or Short	Nominated	

== See also ==
- List of American Academy of Dramatic Arts people
- "Scream king" / "Scream queen"

Preceded by Scott Innes (1999–2009)	Voice of Norville "Shaggy" Rogers; 2004–2007, 2010–present	Succeeded by Will Forte (2020)
