= Matt O'Leary =

American actor (born 1987)

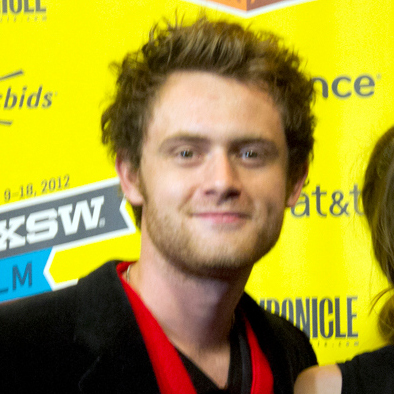
- O'Leary at South by Southwest 2012
- Born: Matthew Joseph O'Leary; July 6, 1987 (age 39); Chicago, Illinois, U.S.
- Occupation: Actor
- Years active: 2000–2019
- Spouse: Jessica Cook (m. 2024)

Matthew Joseph O'Leary (born July 6, 1987) is an American retired actor. He made his debut in the made-for-television Disney Channel Original film Mom's Got a Date with a Vampire (2000), and would go on to star in the thriller Domestic Disturbance (2001) opposite John Travolta. He also had supporting roles in Frailty (2001) and the independent neo-noir film Brick (2005).

In 2011, he starred opposite Rachael Harris in the critically acclaimed independent film Natural Selection, followed by a lead role in Fat Kid Rules the World (2012). He had a minor part in Gore Verbinski's The Lone Ranger (2013) and lead roles in the horror films Stung (2015) and Bokeh (2017).

== Career ==
O'Leary auditioned for the lead in Home Alone 3 and made his acting debut in the lead role in 2000 in the made-for-television film Mom's Got a Date with a Vampire. He was subsequently cast in the thriller Domestic Disturbance, playing the son of John Travolta's character.

O'Leary next appeared in another thriller, Frailty, directed by Bill Paxton, and in the kids comedy Spy Kids 2: The Island of Lost Dreams, both of which opened in 2002 to positive reviews, gaining O'Leary recognition among teenage audiences. In 2003, O'Leary had a minor role in the third Spy Kids film, Spy Kids 3-D: Game Over, and also appeared in the 2004 drama The Alamo, although most of his role was reduced to one line.

In 2005, O'Leary had a role in Warm Springs, a television film, and Havoc, a drama starring Anne Hathaway that was released directly to video. O'Leary rose to mainstream prominence in the latter half of the 2000s for his roles in Brick, a thriller starring Joseph Gordon-Levitt, and the 2007 films Live Free or Die Hard and Death Sentence. He appeared as Garret in the 2009 film Sorority Row and as Johnny Koffin in Mother's Day, released the following year.

In 2011, O'Leary won the Breakthrough Performance award at the 2011 SXSW Film Festival for his work in the film Natural Selection, with Rachael Harris.

== Filmography ==
=== Film ===
Year	Title	Role	Notes
2001	Domestic Disturbance	Danny Morrison	
2001	Frailty	Young Fenton	
2002	Spy Kids 2: The Island of Lost Dreams	Gary Giggles	
2003	Spy Kids 3-D: Game Over	Gary Giggles	Cameo
2004	The Alamo	Boy in Store	
2005	Brick	The Brain	
2005	Havoc	Eric	
2007	Live Free or Die Hard	Clay	
2007	Death Sentence	Joe Darley	
2008	Solstice	Mark	
2008	American Son	Jake	
2009	American Bully	Brandon	
2009	Sorority Row	Garrett Bradley	
2010	Mother's Day	Jonathan "Johnny" Koffin	
2011	Natural Selection	Raymond	
2011	In Time	Moser	
2012	Fat Kid Rules the World	Marcus	
2012	Eden	Vaughan	
2013	The Lone Ranger	Skinny	
2013	Pawn Shop Chronicles	Lamar	
2013	Drones	Jack Bowles	
2014	Two-Bit Waltz	Max	
2014	Time Lapse	Finn	
2015	Stung	Paul	
2015	The Submarine Kid	Toad	
2015	ToY	Transsexual Prostitute	
2015	Moronga	Frank Peluco	
2017	Bokeh	Riley	
2018	Skyscraper	Skinny Hacker	
2018	Welcome to Marwen	Lieutenant Benz / Carl	

=== Television ===
Year	Title	Role	Notes
2000	Mom's Got a Date with a Vampire	Adam Hansen	Television film
2002	Total Access 24/7	Himself	Episode: "Spy Kids 2"
2005	Warm Springs	Fred Botts	Television film
2005	Law & Order: Criminal Intent	Ethan Garrett	Episodes: "In the Wee Small Hours: Part 1 & 2"
2008	Eleventh Hour	Bobby	Episode: "Resurrection"
2008–2009	CSI: Crime Scene Investigation	Dan Forester	Recurring role; 3 episodes
2011	Cinema Verite	Cameron	Television film
2016	Game of Silence	Troy	Episode: "Hurricane Gil"
2016	Sweet/Vicious	Darren Ford	Episode: "Sucker"
2017	Santa Clarita Diet	Cole	Episode: "We Can Kill People"
2017	Major Crimes	Alex Wilson	Episode: "Dead Drop"
2019	Project Blue Book	Lieutenant Henry Fuller	Recurring role; 6 episodes
2019	Agents of S.H.I.E.L.D.	Pax	Recurring role; 5 episodes

=== Web ===
Year	Title	Role	Notes
2011	Marcy	Photographer	Episode: "Marcy Does a Photoshoot"
