= Fat Kid Rules the World =

Book by KL Going

- Author: K. L. Going
- Language: English
- Genre: Young adult novel
- Published: June 23, 2003 Penguin Group
- Publication place: United States
- Media type: Print (hardcover)
- Pages: 224
- ISBN: 978-0-399-23990-8

Fat Kid Rules the World is a young adult novel published by American author K. L. Going in 2003. The story follows a suicidal, 296 pound teen, Troy Billings, who befriends a local guitar legend, Curt MacCrae, who insists that they form a band together with Troy playing drums. KL Going has stated it was inspired by a mix of punk music, Kurt Cobain biographies, and a rejection letter she received from an editor.

== Plot summary ==
Troy, a seventeen year old, 6'1", 298 pound student is contemplating suicide when a homeless former student from Troy's school, Curt MacCrae, intervenes. MacCrae tells Troy that he saved his life, now he owes him a favor, so he insists that they start a band together with Troy playing drums. The only problem is that Troy can't play drums.

Together, Curt and Troy create the band Rage/Tectonic. Although unable to play drums, he goes right into practicing for an upcoming gig. In the process, Troy finds self-confidence and acceptance while realizing he is desperately trying to save Curt's life from drug addiction and abuse.

== Reception ==
Fat Kid Rules the World received mostly positive reviews from critics. The Open Critic stated "K.L. Going makes a great example of teen's life in this great book. Every page will leave the reader thinking of just how more anyone can change." Ilene Cooper from Booklist said, "The narrative could have been tighter in places, but this is an impressive debut that offers hope for all kids--dross transmuted into gold." The novel was awarded the Michael L. Printz Award honor for literary excellence in young adult literature.

Despite the above, the book has been a frequent target of censors; the novel appears on the American Library Association list of the 100 Most Frequently Challenged Books of 2000–2009 at number 58.

== Film adaptation ==
A film adaptation of Fat Kid Rules the World premiered on March 9, 2012, at SXSW in Austin. It was filmed in 2011, under the direction of Matthew Lillard, with Jacob Wysocki, Matt O'Leary, and Billy Campbell in the cast. Mike McCready of Pearl Jam composed the film's soundtrack. Although the novel is set in New York, the film was shot and set in Seattle, with Capitol Hill being used as a backdrop. Fat Kid Rules the World is to be one of the four final feature films to be filmed in Seattle under a Washington financial incentive program. Reviews have been mostly positive. Curt's name is changed to "Marcus" in the film version of the story.
