= Rick Polizzi =

American television producer and author (born 1958)

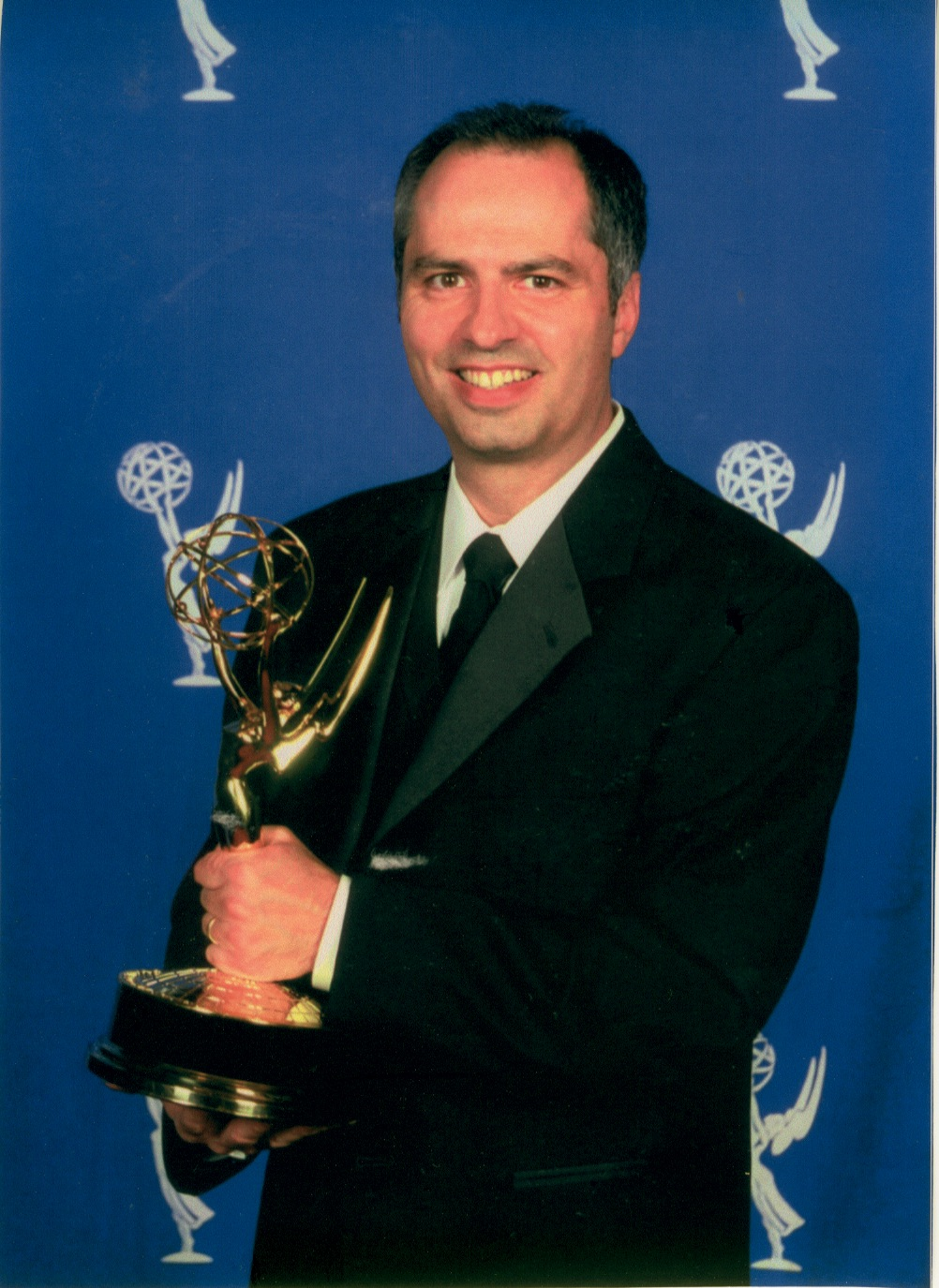
- Born: July 31, 1958 (age 67); New Orleans, Louisiana, U.S.
- Occupation: Producer
- Known for: The Simpsons; Spin Again; Boney Island
- Spouse: Carla Myers Polizzi
- Children: Hannah Emery Polizzi; Bryce Marie Detillieu
- Website: RickPolizzi.com

Rick Polizzi is an American television producer and author. He was animation producer on the successful television series The Simpsons, and creator of Los Angeles based Halloween haunt Boney Island. He has authored and co-authored three coffee-table books on toys from the 60's.

Polizzi has won three Primetime Emmy Awards for The Simpsons.

== Career ==
=== Early career ===
Rick Polizzi was born in New Orleans, Louisiana. He began his career working in the production department at local television station WWL‑TV, creating commercials and public service announcements. Shortly thereafter he served as an on-air entertainment reporter for “PM Magazine”. In 1981, he relocated to Los Angeles, California, where he later graduated from the American Academy of Dramatic Arts.

After moving to Los Angeles, Polizzi worked with production company Churchill Entertainment, which specialized in children’s and educational programming. He also contributed voices, dimensional animation and set-design for ABC weekend specials such as The Mouse and the Motorcycle, Ralph S. Mouse, and for the Disney Channel special Stanley and the Dinosaurs.

=== The Simpsons ===
Polizzi began working on Fox Television's The Simpsons in 1996 as post-production supervisor. He became an Animation producer shortly after. In this capacity he oversaw the international process of delivering over 370 episodes and commercials (including layout in the U.S. and overseas animation production) and wrote some of the show’s opening “couch gag” sequences. During his tenure on the series, Polizzi won three Primetime Emmy Awards for Outstanding Animated Program.

=== Authorship and publishing ===
Polizzi’s passion for vintage board games and collectible plastic model kits led him to co-author the book Spin Again: Board Games From the Fifties and Sixties (1991) with Fred Schaefer. The book explores mid-20th-century board game culture and design. He also authored subsequent books titled Classic Plastic and Baby Boomer Games and Spin Again Magazine.

=== Boney Island ===
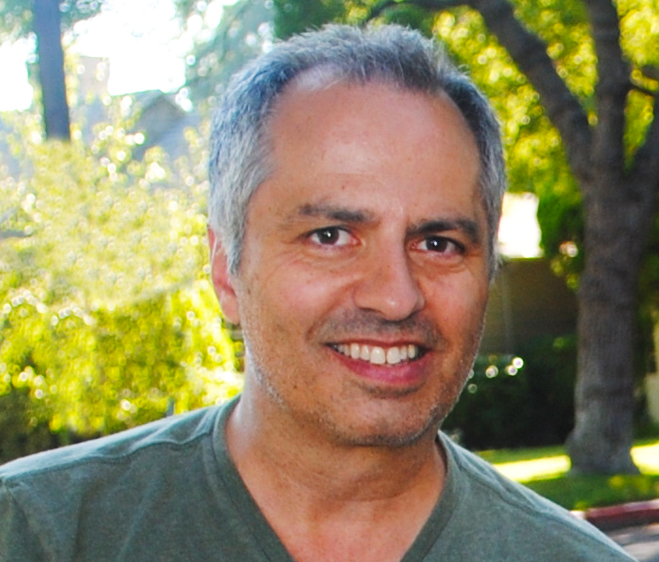

In the mid‑1990s Polizzi launched a large‑scale Halloween display at his home in Sherman Oaks, California. Initially created so his young daughters could enjoy a fun rather than scary Halloween attraction, the event grew into a major “walk‑through” experience with animatronic skeletons, theatrics, animation, and a 4-story treehouse.

The display, named “Boney Island” (a playful reference to New York’s Coney Island), grew into a popular local attraction that drew thousands of visitors to his front yard each year. Over time, Boney Island expanded beyond his home and, with the help of Rex Danyluk, was staged in larger venues — for example, in 2018 the display partnered with the L.A. Live Steamers Railroad Ghost Train event in Griffith Park — and eventually found a home at the Los Angeles Natural History Museum.

After years of legal action by the city of Los Angeles against the Boney Island treehouse in the family's front yard, the iconic structure was removed on March 9, 2025

=== Personal life ===
Polizzi and his family make their home in California, though he maintains strong ties to his native New Orleans. In 2005, he was honored as King of the Krewe of Mid-City, the fifth-oldest parade in Mardi Gras.
