= Triangle Square (film) =

- Directed by: Jeff Terry Anderson
- Written by: Jeff Terry Anderson; Donny Terranova
- Produced by: Jeff Terry Anderson; Donny Terranova; Payam Eshraghian
- Starring: Donny Terranova
- Cinematography: Royce Allen Dudley
- Edited by: Jeff Terry Anderson; Maria Vitakis
- Music by: Stoker and Mosher
- Distributed by: Cornerbrook Films
- Release date: July 28, 2001 (Dances with Films)
- Running time: 93 minutes
- Country: United States
- Language: English

Triangle Square is a 2001 American comedy film written by Jeff Terry Anderson and Donny Terranova, directed by Anderson and starring Terranova.

== Cast ==
- Donny Terranova as Linc
- Jon Cellini as Bobby
- Dawn Cochran as Dena
- Gregory Phelan as Jon
- Eric Etebari as Matt
- Ashley Turner as Hadley
- Jessica Randle as Erica
- Meg Lugaric as Kasey
- Nicole Eggert as Julie
- Matthew Lillard as Snake Eater

== Release ==
The film was shown at the Dances With Films Film Festival in Los Angeles on July 28, 2001.

== Reception ==
Phil Hall of Film Threat gave the film a negative review, describing it as a "dreary, clumsy little would-be comedy..."
