= Christmas in Harmony =

Studio album by Wilson Phillips
- Released: October 12, 2010
- Recorded: 2010
- Studio: Carrie & Rob's home studio; The High Window (Hollywood, California); The Manor Studio and Westlake Studios (Los Angeles, California)
- Genre: Pop, Christmas
- Length: 38:30
- Label: Sony Masterworks
- Producer: Glen Ballard

Wilson Phillips chronology
California (2004)	Christmas in Harmony (2010)	Dedicated (2012)

Christmas in Harmony is the fourth studio album by American pop group Wilson Phillips. A Christmas album, it is their first in six years, after their 2004 covers album California. The album sees them reunite with Glen Ballard, who also produced their first two albums.

It is the first Christmas album of the group, although the Wilson sisters released a Christmas album in 1993, titled Hey Santa!, and Carnie Wilson released a solo Christmas album titled Christmas with Carnie in 2007. It includes a mixture of traditional Christmas carols, covers of Christmas themed songs and new compositions. The song "Warm Lovin' Christmastime" was written by Carnie's husband, Rob Bonfiglio, and was originally included on Carnie's solo Christmas album.

The first single released was "I Wish It Could Be Christmas Every Day", and the group filmed a video for it.

== Track listing ==
No.	Title	Writer(s)	Length
1.	"I Wish It Could Be Christmas Every Day"	Roy Wood	3:09
2.	"Little Drummer Boy"	Katherine Kennicott Davis	3:11
3.	"Warm Lovin' Christmastime"	Robert Bonfiglio	3:25
4.	"When a Child Is Born"	Fred Jacobson, Ciro Dammicco	2:50
5.	"Christmastime"	Chynna Phillips, Glen Ballard	2:40
6.	"Silent Night"	Franz Xaver Gruber, Joseph Mohr	3:02
7.	"Santa Claus Is Coming to Town"	J. Fred Coots, Haven Gillespie	2:46
8.	"Silver Bells"	Jay Livingston, Ray Evans	3:13
9.	"Sleigh Ride"	Leroy Anderson	2:56
10.	"Joy"	Phillips, Carnie Wilson, Wendy Wilson, Ballard, Bonfiglio, Scott Campbell, Danny Knutson	3:38
11.	"Winter Wonderland"	Felix Bernard, Richard Bernhard Smith	2:56
12.	"The Christmas Song"	Robert Wells, Mel Torme	3:22
13.	"Our Prayer"	Brian Wilson	1:22

Barnes & Noble bonus tracks
No.	Title	Length
14.	"Rockin' Around the Christmas Tree"	2:29
15.	"Rockin' Around the Christmas Tree" (Sing-Along Version)	2:29
16.	"I Wish It Could Be Christmas Every Day" (Sing-Along Version)	3:08
17.	"Santa Claus Is Coming To Town" (Sing-Along Version)	2:45

== Personnel ==
Wilson Phillips

- Chynna Phillips – vocals
- Carnie Wilson – vocals
- Wendy Wilson – vocals

Musicians

- Zac Rae – keyboards
- Glen Ballard – synthesizers
- Scott Campbell – additional programming (9)
- Robert Bonfiglio – additional programming (10), scat (11)
- David Levita – guitars
- Simon Smith – bass
- Blair Sinta – drums
- Kim Hutchcroft – saxophones

Arrangements

- Wilson Phillips – vocal arrangements
- Glen Ballard – rhythm arrangements (1–12), vocal arrangements
- Zac Rae – rhythm arrangements (1–12)
- Brian Wilson – arrangements (13)

== Production ==
- Executive Producers – Rick Blaskey, David Simone and Winston Simone.
- Producer – Glen Ballard
- Vocal Production – Rob Bonfiglio and Carnie Wilson
- Engineers – Rob Bonfiglio, Scott Campbell and Bill Malina.
- Assistant Engineer – Brian Warwick
- Mixing – Scott Campbell and Bill Malina
- Editing – Scott Campbell and Brian Warwick
- Mastered by Stephen Marcussen at Marcussen Mastering (Hollywood, California).
- A&R – Gregory Davidson and Cathleen Murphy
- Production Coordinator – Jolie Levine
- Project Coordinator – Angela Vicari
- Project Development – Laura Kazan and Jennifer Liebeskind
- Art Direction – Roxanne Silmak
- Package Design – Jeff Schultz
- Photography – Randee St. Nicholas
- Manager – Alex Miller

== Charts ==
Chart (2010)	Peak position
U.S. Billboard Top Holiday Albums	9
