= The Wilsons (album) =

Studio album by The Wilsons
- Released: September 9, 1997
- Studio: Music Grinder Studios, Ocean Way Recording, A&M Studios, Sound Stage Studios and EMI Recording Studios (Hollywood, CA); The Complex and Sarm West Coast (Los Angeles, CA); Home Suite Home Studios (Valencia, CA); The Chapel (Encino, CA); Blue Iron Gate Studios (Santa Monica, CA); Chicago Recording Company and River North Studios (Chicago, IL)
- Genre: Pop; Rock
- Length: 50:35
- Label: Mercury
- Producer: Stephen Lironi; Dave Stewart; Clif Magness; Garry Hughes; Brian Wilson; Joe Thomas

Professional ratings
Review scores
Source	Rating
Allmusic	3/5 stars

The Wilsons is an album by a short-lived music group of the same name, consisting of Carnie Wilson and her sister Wendy Wilson, with some guest appearances by and collaborations with their father Brian Wilson of The Beach Boys.

== History ==
After Wilson Phillips broke up in 1993, Carnie & Wendy Wilson continued to write and record together. They released a Christmas album together in 1993 titled Hey Santa!, which was the first album recorded by the Wilson sisters without Chynna Phillips. The album was a collection of classic holiday songs, with one original song (the title track). It was not a commercial success, although the single "Hey Santa!" still receives recurrent airplay during the Christmas holiday season.

Wendy and Carnie then joined with their estranged father Brian in 1997, and went on to release The Wilsons, which was critically successful, yet also commercially unsuccessful. A single "Monday Without You" was released in 1997, but failed to chart on Billboard's Top 100. Brian's collaborator Joe Thomas co-produced the track "Everything I Need". Session drummer Hal Blaine, who played on the recording, later said that Thomas ruined the song with excessive amounts of percussive flourishes: "I couldn't believe what I was hearing, what they did to this beautiful [song]. It was like someone took a beautiful Ferrari and beat the crap out of it with a sledgehammer. ... Some guys will get hold of Brian and talk him into anything."

Carnie and Wendy joined Beach Boy Al Jardine in 1998, for three years of live performances, and a live album in 2001, Al Jardine's Family and Friends Live in Las Vegas. The Wilson sisters reunited with Chynna Phillips in 2001 to perform live at a tribute show to Brian Wilson, and in 2004 to release California, an album of cover songs. They reunited again in 2012 for the album Dedicated, which included covers of hit songs by The Mamas & the Papas and The Beach Boys. Also in 2012, Carnie and Wendy Wilson joined with the children of other Beach Boys' members to form the vocal group California Saga, which performed during the intermission for The Beach Boys' 50th-anniversary show in June at the Hollywood Bowl.

== Track listing ==
No.	Title	Writer(s)	Producer(s)	Length
1.	"Monday Without You" (with Brian Wilson)	Carole King; Mark Hudson; Paul Brady	Stephen Lironi	4:03
2.	"Good About You"	Lironi; Bob Marlette; Carnie Wilson; Wendy Wilson	Lironi	4:17
3.	"Miracle" (with Brian Wilson)	Bobby Bluebell; David A. Stewart; B. Wilson; C. Wilson; W. Wilson	Stewart	5:56
4.	"Goddess' Revival"	Clif Magness; C. Wilson; W. Wilson	Magness	4:18
5.	"Candy"	Bluebell; Stewart; C. Wilson; W. Wilson	Stewart	4:53
6.	"'Til I Die" (with Brian Wilson)	B. Wilson	B. Wilson; Joe Thomas	3:22
7.	"St. Joan"	Marc Jordan; Magness; C. Wilson; W. Wilson	Magness	4:08
8.	"Open Door"	Glen Burtnick; Shelly Peitken; C. Wilson; W. Wilson	Garry Hughes	4:04
9.	"I Hate Your Face"	Magness; C. Wilson; W. Wilson	Magness	4:27
10.	"Everything"	Jordan; Magness; C. Wilson; W. Wilson	Magness	3:30
11.	"Not Your Average Girl"	Marlette; C. Wilson; W. Wilson	Hughes	3:10
12.	"Everything I Need" (with Brian Wilson)	Tony Asher; B. Wilson	B. Wilson; Thomas	3:28
Total length:				50:35

Japanese release bonus track
No.	Title	Writer(s)	Producer(s)	Length
13.	"Pretty Poison"	Burtnick; C. Wilson; W. Wilson; Peitken	Hughes	4:32

== Personnel ==
- Brian Wilson – vocals (1, 3, 6, 12), acoustic piano (12), arrangements (12)
- Carnie Wilson – vocals, vocal arrangements (11)
- Wendy Wilson – vocals, vocal arrangements (11)
- Stephen Lironi – keyboards (1, 2), guitars (1, 2), bass (1, 2), percussion (1, 2), additional keyboards (6), additional programming (6)
- Paul Taylor – programming (3)
- Clif Magness – programming (4, 7, 10), guitars (4, 7, 9, 10), arrangements (4, 7, 9, 10), keyboards (7, 10), percussion (7, 9)
- Andy Wright – programming (5)
- Joe Thomas – keyboards (6), additional keyboards (12)
- Ira Antelis – Synclavier programming (6)
- Garry Hughes – keyboards (8, 11), programming (8, 11)
- Frank Marocco – accordion (12)
- David A. Stewart – guitars (3, 5)
- Greg Leisz – guitars (6, 12)
- Brent Rowan – guitars (6), acoustic guitar (12)
- Waddy Wachtel – guitars (6)
- Tim Pierce – guitars (8, 11)
- Dennis Budimir – guitars (12)
- Mitch Holder – guitars (12)
- Mike Miller – guitars (12)
- Tom Rizzo – guitars (12)
- Jerry Watts – bass (3, 5)
- Michael Rhodes – bass (6)
- Steve Rodby – bass (6)
- Leland Sklar – bass (8, 11)
- Carol Kaye – electric bass (12)
- Mitch Kahl - guitars (4, 6)
- Nick Vincent – drums (1, 2)
- Abe Laboriel Jr. – drums (3, 5)
- Josh Freese – drums (4, 7, 9, 10)
- Eddie Bayers – drums (6, 12)
- Mike Baird – drums (8, 11)
- Hal Blaine – drums (12)
- Alex Acuña – percussion (6, 12)
- Jackie Bertone – percussion (6)
- Lawrence Berment – steel drums (12)
- Daniel Greco – vibraphone (12)
- Larry Franklin – fiddle (6)
- Tommy Morgan – harmonica (12)
- Jay Migliori – saxophones (12)
- Doug Norwine – saxophones (12)
- Bob Sheppard – saxophones (12)
- Bill Armstrong – trumpet (12)
- Daniel Fornero – trumpet (12)
- Timothy B. Schmit – additional backing vocals (6)

Strings on "Everything I Need"

- Tom Rizzo – arrangements and conductor
- Ralph Morrison – concertmaster
- Larry Corbett, Barbara George, Barry Gold and Jerome Kessler – cello
- Dave Carpenter and Michael Rhodes – double bass
- Carole Castillo, Matt Funes, John Hayhurst and Evan Wilson – viola
- Juliann French, Julie Gigante, Jayme Miller, Irma Neumann, Barbra Porter, Michele Richards, Rachel Robinson, Steve Scharf, Mari Tsumura, Elizabeth Wilson and Jennifer Woodward – violin

== Production ==
- Steve Greenberg – A&R direction
- Brian Wilson – executive producer, producer (6, 12)
- Carnie Wilson – executive producer, vocal co-producer (4, 8–11)
- Wendy Wilson – executive producer, vocal co-producer (4, 8–11)
- Stephen Lironi – producer (1, 2)
- David A. Stewart – producer (3, 5)
- Clif Magness – producer (4, 7, 9, 10)
- Joe Thomas – producer (6, 12)
- Garry Hughes – producer (8, 11)
- Jolie Levine-Aller – production coordinator (4, 7, 9, 10)
- Lisa Roy – talent coordinator (6, 12)
- Tom Rizzo – talent coordinator (12)
- Rick Patrick – art direction
- Jeffdidthis (Jeff Schulz) – design
- Naomi Kaltman – photography

Technical credits

- Chris Bellman – mastering at Bernie Grundman Mastering (Hollywood, California)
- Doug Trantow – first engineer (1, 2)
- Frances Buckley – mixing (1, 2, 4, 6–11)
- Femi Jiya – recording (3, 5), mixing (3, 5)
- Kevin Clark – engineer (4, 7, 9, 10)
- Clif Magness – engineer (4, 7, 9, 10)
- Ray Blair – engineer (6)
- Joe Chiccharelli – engineer (6)
- Peter Doell – engineer (6)
- Rick Fritz – engineer (6, 12), mixing (6, 12)
- Donal Hodgson – engineer (6, 8, 11)
- Jeff Van Steen – ISDN engineer (6)
- Joe Thomas – mixing (6, 12)
- Brian Wilson – mixing (6, 12)
- A.J. Jeffries – engineer (7)
- Rudy Haeusermann – second engineer (1, 2)
- Lee Manning – assistant engineer (3, 5)
- Rob Brill – assistant engineer (4, 7, 9, 10)
- Chris Bamford – assistant engineer (6, 12)
- David Foster – assistant engineer (6, 12)
- Mike Lavin – assistant engineer (6, 12)
