= Carnie Wilson =

American singer (born 1968)

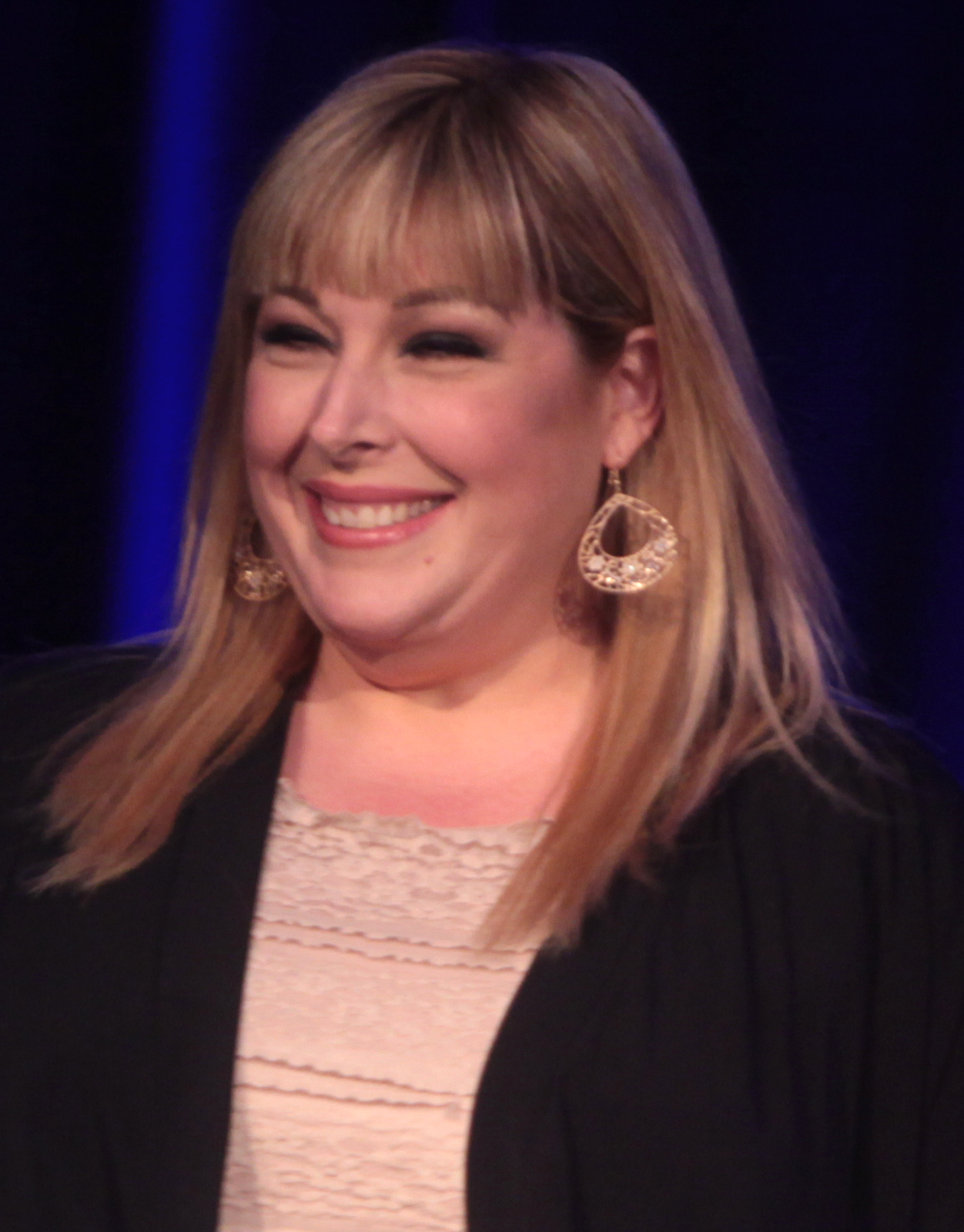
- Wilson in 2014
- Born: April 29, 1968 (age 58); Los Angeles, California, U.S.
- Occupations: Singer; television host
- Years active: 1989–present
- Spouse: Robert Bonfiglio (m. 2000)
- Children: 2
- Parents: Brian Wilson (father); Marilyn Wilson-Rutherford (mother)
- Relatives: Wendy Wilson (sister); Dennis Wilson (uncle); Carl Wilson (uncle); Murry Wilson (grandfather); Mike Love (first cousin once removed); Stan Love (first cousin once removed); Kevin Love (second cousin)
- Musical career
- Genres: Pop; pop rock
- Instrument: Vocals
- Years active: 1989–present
- Labels: SBK; Sony; Columbia
- Member of: Wilson Phillips

Carnie Wilson (born April 29, 1968) is an American singer and television personality. She is the daughter of Brian Wilson and in 1989 co-founded the pop music trio Wilson Phillips with her younger sister Wendy. From 1995 onwards, she has also been a host or guest star on a variety of television shows.

== Early life and musical career ==
Carnie Wilson was born in Los Angeles on April 29, 1968, the daughter of Brian Wilson of the Beach Boys and of his first wife, former singer Marilyn Rovell of the Honeys. Her mother is of Jewish heritage, while her father was of Dutch, Scottish, English, German, Irish, and Swedish ancestry.

She co-founded Wilson Phillips with her younger sister Wendy and childhood friend Chynna Phillips in 1989. They released two albums, Wilson Phillips and Shadows and Light, which between them sold 12 million copies. The group also charted three number-one singles, including "Hold On", and six top-20 hits in the United States before disbanding in 1993.

Carnie and Wendy Wilson continued to record together, releasing the Christmas album Hey Santa! in 1993. They joined with their father for the 1997 album The Wilsons. Carnie also sang "Our Time Has Come" with James Ingram for the 1997 animated film Cats Don't Dance.

In 2003, Carnie attempted to launch a solo music career with the album For the First Time. The record featured a remake of the Olivia DiNucci-penned Samantha Mumba ballad "Don't Need You To (Tell Me I'm Pretty)", retitled "I Don't Need You To", as its first single. To help promote the album, she posed nude for the August 2003 issue of Playboy. However, the single failed to gain interest and the album was ultimately shelved when Carnie regrouped with Wendy and Chynna as Wilson Phillips in 2004.

Reunited, the band released a third album, named California, which appeared on Sony Music's record label. The album featured cover songs, primarily from the 1960s and 1970s, and specifically highlighted the glory days of their parents' California-based musical groups: The Mamas & the Papas and the Beach Boys.

In 2006, Carnie released an album of lullabies, A Mother's Gift: Lullabies from the Heart, created shortly after the birth of her daughter, Lola. She released her second solo effort in October 2007, a Christmas album entitled Christmas with Carnie, featuring a song written by her husband, "Warm Lovin' Christmastime".

In 2011, Wilson had a career resurgence with a cameo in the film Bridesmaids singing the hit single "Hold On" with Wendy and Chynna at the wedding in the film's finale.

In 2022, Wilson Phillips released a cover of Harry Styles' "Boyfriends."

== Television career ==
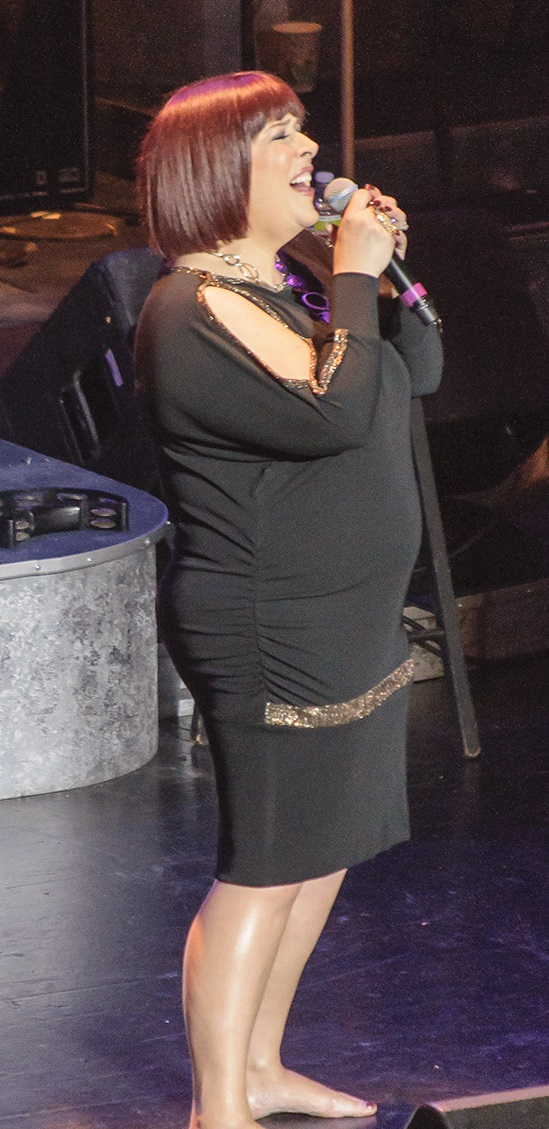
Wilson performing with Wilson Phillips in 2013

From 1995 to 1996, Carnie hosted her own short-lived syndicated television talk show, Carnie! The series was launched during the mid-1990s wave of popularity in "tabloid" talk shows, which followed the sudden successes of Ricki Lake and Jerry Springer. Former Cosmopolitan's Bachelor of the Month Chris Greeley was a guest on the television pilot. Wilson found the experience a disappointment and a source of professional and personal frustration.

She later guest-starred on episodes of That 70s Show in 2001 and Sabrina the Teenage Witch, before joining the fourth season of VH1's Celebrity Fit Club in 2006.

Wilson has also been a correspondent on Entertainment Tonight and in 2006 hosted a special on E! titled 101 Celebrity Slimdowns. She became a cast member of the CMT series Gone Country in January 2008. In April 2008, she was a cast member of the VH1 series Celebracadabra. In July 2008, she starred in a show called Outsider's Inn.

She hosted GSN's new edition of The Newlywed Game, which premiered April 6, 2009, until late 2010, when she was replaced by Sherri Shepherd.

In addition, a reality show starring Wilson, Carnie Wilson: Unstapled, began airing on GSN on January 14, 2010. In August 2011, Wilson became a judge on the ABC show Karaoke Battle USA.

On January 2, 2012, she appeared on ABC's Celebrity Wife Swap, trading places with actress Tracey Gold for a week.

In 2012, Carnie, along with Wendy and Chynna Phillips, starred in their own reality show on the TV Guide Network about the rebirth of their band, Wilson Phillips. The show, called Wilson Phillips: Still Holding On, logged the journey of the trio getting back together to reform Wilson Phillips on the road, in the studio, and at home as working mothers. A pilot episode aired in November 2011. Seven additional episodes aired in April and May 2012.

Wilson starred in the Chopped "All Stars: Celebrities" episode and got to second place.

In 2013, Carnie became a member of "Team Rachael" on the second season of the Food Network's Rachael vs. Guy: Celebrity Cook-Off. She came in second to Dean McDermott and won $10,000 for her charity, an autism research foundation.

She also frequently filled in as a guest host on CBS's The Talk.

In 2015, she played herself as an auto insurance claimant on a Progressive Insurance TV commercial. On January 28, 2016, she was announced to be a contestant on The New Celebrity Apprentice (also known as The Apprentice 15 and Celebrity Apprentice 8). On January 2, 2017, Wilson was the second contestant fired, finishing in 15th place, earning no money for her charity, the Weight Loss Surgery Foundation of America.

In July 2016, Wilson Phillips reunited and performed on ABC's Greatest Hits.

In February 2017, Wilson made a guest appearance on the reality show The Real Housewives of Beverly Hills.

In 2022, she performed with Wendy and Chynna as the trio "Lambs" on the eighth season of The Masked Singer. In the finale, they sang "I'm Every Woman" and "I Want to Know What Love Is". They finished second, after Amber Riley as "Harp".

In April 2024, she launched Sounds Delicious with Carnie Wilson, a cooking/reality show on AXS TV.

In March 2025, she appeared on American Idol with her 19-year-old daughter, Lola, who was auditioning with the song "Hold On". They were accompanied by Carnie's husband and sister Wendy.

== Personal life ==
=== Marriage and family ===
Wilson married musician and producer Robert Bonfiglio in 2000. They have two daughters.

Her paternal uncles were Dennis Wilson and Carl Wilson, whose cousins were the Beach Boys co-founder Mike Love and his brother, the former NBA player Stan Love. She is the second cousin of Stan's son, Utah Jazz player Kevin Love.

Her stepmother, Melinda Ledbetter Wilson, died in January 2024. Melinda married Brian Wilson in 1995 and they adopted five children. Through their relationship, Carnie has five adopted siblings.

=== Addictions, weight loss, and surgeries ===
In 2024, Wilson said she had considered suicide 20 years earlier, when she had been addicted to drugs and alcohol. "I could not stop drinking or using drugs. I love life, I love my family. I've always had great friends, great support, success. But, that day, I thought it would just probably be easier if I just turned the wheel and drive off the cliff because alcohol had me in a chokehold and so much power over me, I could not stop drinking one day at a time."

She has also said she has an addiction to food, which led her to get gastric bypass surgery in 1999 and a follow-up lap-band surgery in 2012.

In 2017, she underwent surgery to remove her ruptured breast implants. "Sixteen years ago, I lost a bunch of weight, and I had a breast lift and an augmentation and the implants have ruptured now. And so, I have to go have them taken out and face this reconstruction, which is really scary," she said on The Talk.

=== Bell's palsy diagnosis ===
On March 18, 2013, Wilson disclosed, through Twitter, that she had been diagnosed with Bell's palsy.

=== Love Bites by Carnie ===
On August 26, 2017, Carnie and her business partner, childhood friend Tiffany Miller, opened Love Bites by Carnie, a commercial production bakery in Sherwood, Oregon, a suburb of Portland. Love Bites by Carnie made gourmet, bite-sized cookies. It went out of business in 2021.

== Discography ==
with Wilson Phillips

- Wilson Phillips (1990)
- Shadows and Light (1992)
- California (2004)
- Christmas in Harmony (2010)
- Dedicated (2012)

as Carnie and Wendy Wilson/the Wilsons

- Hey Santa! (1993)
- The Wilsons (with select appearances by Brian Wilson) (1997)

Solo

- For the First Time (2003)
- A Mother's Gift: Lullabies from the Heart (2006)
- Christmas with Carnie (2007)
