= Dedicated (Wilson Phillips album) =

Studio album by Wilson Phillips
- Released: April 3, 2012
- Studio: Lafx (North Hollywood, California); The Manor (Tarzana, California); Playback (Santa Barbara, California)
- Genre: Pop
- Length: 39:38
- Label: Sony Masterworks
- Producer: Robert Bonfiglio

Wilson Phillips chronology
Christmas in Harmony (2010)	Dedicated (2012)

Singles from Dedicated
- 1. "Good Vibrations" Released: 2012

Dedicated is the fifth studio album by American pop group Wilson Phillips, released on April 3, 2012, by Sony Masterworks. The album consists of cover versions from the band members' parents groups, the Beach Boys and the Mamas & the Papas, and was released for Wilson Phillips' 20th anniversary. A special two-disc edition of the album was released on July 9, with the second disc featuring a cappella versions of the cover songs and a live recording of the trio's hit single "Hold On".

== Reception ==
Stephen Thomas Erlewine of AllMusic wrote that the album "contains plenty of faithful, loving versions of songs by the Beach Boys and Mamas & Papas that you know by heart" with a "sweet, clean treatment by Wilson Phillips, whose signature harmonies shine in this pristine setting", but characterizes the music as "comfort food" where "there are no real surprises here, either in attitude or arrangement". In Entertainment Weekly, Mikael Wood rated the album a C, calling it a "ho-hum tribute", and pointing out that the cover of "Good Vibrations" is a stand-out.

== Track listing ==
Dedicated track listing
No.	Title	Writer(s)	Original artist	Length
1.	"California Dreamin'"	John Phillips; Michelle Phillips	The Mamas & the Papas	2:49
2.	"Wouldn't It Be Nice"	Tony Asher; Mike Love; Brian Wilson	The Beach Boys	2:45
3.	"Dedicated to the One I Love"	Ralph Bass; Lowman Pauling	The Mamas & the Papas	3:07
4.	"Don't Worry Baby"	Roger Christian; B. Wilson	The Beach Boys	3:31
5.	"Twelve Thirty"	J. Phillips	The Mamas & the Papas	3:37
6.	"I Can Hear Music"	Jeff Barry; Ellie Greenwich; Phil Spector	The Beach Boys	3:07
7.	"Monday Monday"	J. Phillips	The Mamas & the Papas	4:17
8.	"Do It Again"	Love; B. Wilson	The Beach Boys	2:51
9.	"Got a Feelin'"	Denny Doherty; J. Phillips	The Mamas & the Papas	3:33
10.	"Fun, Fun, Fun"	Love; B. Wilson	The Beach Boys	2:27
11.	"God Only Knows"	Asher; B. Wilson	The Beach Boys	3:49
12.	"Good Vibrations"	Love; B. Wilson	The Beach Boys	3:45
Total length:				39:38

Dedicated Three Voices track listing
No.	Title	Writer(s)	Length
1.	"California Dreamin'" (a cappella)	J. Phillips; M. Phillips	2:33
2.	"Wouldn't It Be Nice" (a cappella)	Asher; Love; B. Wilson	2:44
3.	"Dedicated to the One I Love" (a cappella)	Bass; Pauling	2:59
4.	"I Can Hear Music" (a cappella)	Barry; Greenwich; Spector	3:14
5.	"Do It Again" (a cappella)	Love; B. Wilson	4:22
6.	"Got a Feelin'" (a cappella)	Doherty; J. Phillips	3:06
7.	"God Only Knows" (a cappella)	Asher; B. Wilson	2:35
8.	"Hold On" (live at Infinity Hall, Norfolk, CT)	Carnie Wilson; Chynna Phillips; Glen Ballard	3:31
Total length:			25:04

== Personnel ==
Wilson Phillips

- Chynna Phillips – vocals, vocal arrangements
- Carnie Wilson – vocals, vocal arrangements
- Wendy Wilson – vocals, vocal arrangements

Musicians

- Zac Rae – keyboards
- Robert Bonfiglio – guitars (1–4, 6–11), percussion (1, 3, 4, 6–9, 11), vocals (4, 6), synthesizers (5, 7, 11), vocal arrangements
- David Levita – guitars
- Simon Smith – bass guitar
- Blair Sinta – drums, percussion

=== Production ===
- David Simoné – executive producer
- Winston Simone – executive producer
- Robert Bonfiglio – producer, engineer
- Scott Campbell – engineer
- Brian Warwick – engineer
- Chandler Harrod – assistant engineer
- Bill Malina – mixing
- Brian Gardner – mastering at Bernie Grundman Mastering (Hollywood, California)
- Jeremy Cowart – photography
- Jeff Schulz – art direction, design
- Wilson Phillips – liner notes

== Chart performance ==
Dedicated reached No. 29 on the Billboard 200, and the single "Good Vibrations" peaked at No. 25 on the Adult Contemporary chart.

== See also ==
- List of 2012 albums
