= Vaughan Penn =

American singer-songwriter

Vaughan Penn is an American singer/songwriter/producer from North Carolina who has had over 150 television and film placements featuring 55 original songs. She's known for her sound of earthy-pop-rock music that combines songwriting with melodic sounds. The production has rhythmic textures and Americana roots.

- Grey's Anatomy
- Private Practice
- Boston Legal
- The Hills
- Laguna Beach: The Real Orange County
- Kicking & Screaming
- Showtimes Promo For: Nurse Jackie, L-Word, Californication, Weeds
- The Big Short
- Private Practice
- Forget Me Not
- Criminal Minds
- Bones
- NBCs Superstore
- OWNs/The Hero Effect (Rising Tide episode)
- Isabelle Dances Into The Spotlight

Vaughan has recorded with, toured and opened for many national acts including: Emmy Lou Harris, Indigo Girls, Darius Rucker and Huey Lewis to name a few.

== Discography ==
Vaughan has released nine CDs on her indie label Meepers Music Records: She has also released one CD with Sony/Provident

- Barefoot Martini (2022)
- Surf City Sessions (2021)
- Vaughan & The ChillCats (2020-Vaughan's Debut Jazz CD)
- Carolina Island Girl (2019)
- Acoustic Detour (2017 Meepers Music Records)
- Renew The Power (2015 Meepers Music Records)
- Solitary Girl (2011 Meepers Music Records)
- One Reason - Chynna & Vaughan (2009 Provident/Sony)
- Somebody Besides Yourself (2007 Meepers Music Records)
- Angels Fly (2005 Meepers Music Records)
- Transcendence (2003 Meepers Music Records)
- Over My Head (2001 Meepers Music Records)

== Other works ==
She was in a Contemporary Christian duo with Chynna Phillips (the member of Wilson Phillips) called Chynna & Vaughan (Provident/Reunion Records).
