= Naked and Sacred =

Studio album by Chynna Phillips
- Released: November 7, 1995
- Recorded: May−September 1995
- Genre: Pop; pop rock
- Length: 46:12
- Label: EMI
- Producer: Glen Ballard; Desmond Child; Patrick Leonard; Rick Nowels; Jeff Smith; Elliot Wolff; Billy Steinberg; Peter Lord Moreland

Professional ratings
Review scores
Source	Rating
AllMusic	4/5 stars

Naked and Sacred is Chynna Phillips' debut (and only) solo album, released on November 7, 1995. She was the only member of the pop group Wilson Phillips to remain on her label, EMI, after the group broke up in late 1992. The album didn't see strong sales, selling 22,000 copies in the United States according to Billboard.com, but received good reviews. Chynna co-wrote 8 of the album's 11 songs (writing the last track on her own), which featured productions from Rick Nowels, Glen Ballard (who produced the majority of Wilson Phillips' previous work), and Desmond Child. According to Phillips, she was offered $1 million to record a solo album for EMI and was dropped shortly after due to the album's disappointing sales.

Three singles were commercially released from the album: "Naked and Sacred", "I Live for You" (which was featured in the end credits of the 1996 film Striptease starring Demi Moore), and "Just to Hear You Say That You Love Me" (written by Diane Warren, and later recorded as a duet by country music singers Faith Hill and Tim McGraw for Hill's 1998 album Faith). The album track "Remember Me" was released in promo form and sent to U.S. radio in 1996 but was never commercially released.

== Track listing ==
No.	Title	Writer(s)	Producer(s)	Length
1.	"Naked and Sacred"	Chynna Phillips; Rick Nowels; Billy Steinberg	Steinberg; Nowels	4:14
2.	"When 2000 Comes"	Phillips; Peter Lord Moreland	Moreland; Vernon Jeff Smith	4:44
3.	"Remember Me"	Phillips; Nowels	Nowels	4:54
4.	"I Live for You"	Phillips; Desmond Child	Child	3:47
5.	"This Close"	Phillips; Child	Child	4:27
6.	"Till the End"	Phillips; Patrick Leonard	Leonard	4:14
7.	"Turn Around"	Stacey Piersa; Elliot Wolff	Wolff	4:08
8.	"Just to Hear You Say That You Love Me"	Diane Warren	Child	4:33
9.	"Follow Love Down"	Phillips; Glen Ballard	Ballard	3:43
10.	"Jewel in My Crown"	Phillips; Child	Child	4:06
11.	"Will You?"	Phillips	Leonard	3:23
Total length:				46:12

Japanese release bonus track
No.	Title	Writer(s)	Producer(s)	Length
12.	"Life Ain't No Dress Rehearsal"	Phillips	Ballard	3:55
Total length:				50:08

== Singles ==
Naked and Sacred (1995) CD single

1. "Naked and Sacred" (Album Version) – 4:10
2. "Naked and Sacred" (David Morales Radio Mix) – 4:04
3. "Naked and Sacred" (David Morales Classic Club Mix) – 7:56
4. "Follow Love Down" – 4:32

I Live for You (1996) CD single

1. "I Live for You" – 3:47
2. "Life Ain't No Dress Rehearsal" – 3:55

Remember Me (Promo Only) (1996) CD single

1. "Remember Me" (Radio Edit) – 4:02

Just to Hear You Say That You Love Me (International release, 1996) CD single

1. "Just to Hear You Say That You Love Me" (Album Version) – 4:33
2. "Free This Feeling" – 4:31
3. "Unfinished Business" – 3:57

#	Title	Date	AUS	UK
1.	"Naked and Sacred"	1995	15	62
2.	"I Live for You"	1996	9	—

== Production and personnel ==
*Track 1 recorded by Peter Lorimer, Steve MacMillan and Chris Garcia. Track 3 recorded by John Ingoldsby. Both songs mixed by Steve MacMillan. Claude Gaudette: Drum Programming, Keyboards; Charlie Clouser: Drum Programming; Chris Garcia: Loops; Charles Judge: Keyboards; Rick Nowels: Keyboards, Acoustic Guitars; Rusty Anderson: Guitar and Bouzouki; Michael Landau, John Ingoldsby: Guitars; John Pierce, Paul Bushnell: Bass; Luis Conte: Percussion

*Track 2 recorded by V. Jeffrey Smith and Ron Banks, with assistance by Andrew Page. Mixed by Ron Banks, with assistance by Andrew Page. Peter Lord Moreland and V. Jeffrey Smith: Keyboards, Drum Programming; T-Bone Wolk: Guitars

*Tracks 4, 5 and 8 recorded by Mark Gruber. Track 10 recorded by Matt Gruber. Track 4 mixed by Michael Brauer. Tracks 5, 8 and 10 mixed by David Thoener. Lester Mendez, Jeffrey Vanston: Keyboards; Dan Warner, Toledo, Brian Adler: Guitars; Julio Fernandez: Bass; Curt Bisquera: Drums on tracks 4 and 5; Andrea Byers, Assa Drori, Dennis Molchan, Dixie Blackstone, Elizabeth Baker, Elizabeth Wilson, Eve Sprecher, Irving Geller, Jennifer Woodward, Marc Sazer, Mark Baranov, Michele Richards, Miwako Watanabe, Pip Clarke-Ling, Barbra Porter, Gerj Garabedian, Robert Peterson, Bruce Dukov, Charles Everett, John Wittenberg, Joy Lyle, Karen Jones, Maria Newman, Mario De Leon, Michelle Richards, Rachel Robinson, Sheldon Sanov, Tamara Chang: Violin; Jerry Epstein, Margot MacLaine, Marilyn Baker, Rollice Dale, Denyse Buffum, Evan Wilson, Bob Becker, Scott Haupert: Viola

*Tracks 6 and 11 recorded by Jerry Jordan. Mixed by David Thoener and Jerry Jordan. Patrick Leonard: Keyboards; James Harrah: Guitars; Spencer Campbell: Bass; Brian MacLeod: Drums, Percussion; Luis Conte: Percussion; Strings contracted and arranged by Bill Meyers.

== Charts and sales ==
Chart (1996)	Peak position
Australian Albums (ARIA)	35

Country	Sales
United States	22,000
