= Naked and Sacred (song) =

1995 single by Chynna Phillips

Single by Chynna Phillips

from the album Naked and Sacred
- B-side: "Follow Love Down"; "Love Ain't No Dress Rehearsal"
- Released: October 10, 1995
- Length: 4:10
- Label: EMI
- Songwriters: Billy Steinberg; Rick Nowels; Chynna Phillips
- Producers: Billy Steinberg; Rick Nowels

Chynna Phillips singles chronology
"Naked and Sacred" (1995)	"I Live for You" (1996)

Music video
- "Naked and Sacred" on YouTube

"Naked and Sacred" is a song by American singer and actress Chynna Phillips from her first solo album, Naked and Sacred (1995). Written by Phillips, Billy Steinberg and Rick Nowels, the song was released by EMI Records as Phillips' debut solo single on October 10, 1995, and charted at number 15 in Australia and number 62 in the United Kingdom. It was also a modest adult contemporary hit in Canada, peaking at number 19 on the RPM Adult Contemporary chart. In 1998, British singer Maria Nayler covered the song, reaching number 32 in the UK with her version.

== Track listings ==
- US and UK cassette single; Japanese mini-CD single
1. "Naked and Sacred" (album version) – 4:10
2. "Follow Love Down" – 3:42
- US and UK 12-inch single

A1. "Naked and Sacred" (classic club mix) – 7:56
A2. "Naked and Sacred" (dub mix) – 7:01
B1. "Naked and Sacred" (radio mix) – 4:04
B2. "Naked and Sacred" (naked dub) – 6:53
B3. "Naked and Sacred" (reprise) – 3:30

- UK CD single
1. "Naked and Sacred" (album version) – 4:10
2. "Naked and Sacred" (radio mix) – 4:04
3. "Naked and Sacred" (classic club mix) – 7:56
4. "Follow Love Down" – 3:42
- European and Australian CD single
1. "Naked and Sacred" – 4:06
2. "Follow Love Down" – 3:41
3. "Life Ain't No Dress Rehearsal" – 3:55

== Charts ==
=== Weekly charts ===
Chart (1995–1996)	Peak position
Australia (ARIA)	15
Canada Adult Contemporary (RPM)	19
Scottish Singles Sales (Official Charts)	74
UK Singles (Official Charts)	62
UK Club Chart (Music Week)	35

=== Year-end charts ===
Chart (1996)	Position
Australia (ARIA)	76

== Release history ==
Region	Date	Format(s)	Label(s)	Ref.
United States	October 10, 1995	Contemporary hit radio	EMI	
Japan	November 1, 1995	Mini-CD	EMI	
United Kingdom	January 22, 1996	12-inch vinyl; CD; cassette	EMI	
