= Carnie! =

American daytime talk show

- Genre: Tabloid talk show
- Presented by: Carnie Wilson
- Country of origin: United States
- Original language: English
- No. of seasons: 1

Production
- Executive producer: Carnie Wilson
- Producer: Carnie Wilson
- Production locations: NBC Studios; Burbank, California
- Camera setup: Videotape; Multi-camera
- Running time: 1 hour (including commercials); 40 minutes (without commercials)
- Production company: Telepictures Productions

Original release
- Network: Syndicated
- Release: September 4, 1995 – February 23, 1996

Carnie! is an American daytime talk show that was hosted by Carnie Wilson. The show ran in syndication for one season from September 4, 1995, to February 23, 1996. The program was a production of Telepictures Productions, distributed by Warner Bros. Domestic Television Distribution.

Carnie! premiered on September 4, 1995, and was one of several talk shows with first time hosts that premiered that fall. Although Wilson drew higher ratings than all of the newcomers, like them the show did not do well enough to last and Carnie! was cancelled at midseason. New episodes aired until February 23, 1996, with reruns following until June 7.

== Production ==
=== Conception and development ===
In December 1994, Wilson and her sister, Wendy, appeared on The Howard Stern Show to promote their Christmas album, Hey Santa! Executive producer Cathy Chermol heard the episode and referred Wilson to Warner Bros. Domestic Television Distribution, who, after an audition, offered Wilson a talk show.

=== Topic selection ===
According to Wilson, "You have to do what rates, but, then again, if [the viewers] want to see strippers, we're going to find a way to do it in a classy way, believe it or not."

== Broadcast history and release ==
The show was broadcast on 133 television stations nationwide, which covered 84 percent of the country.

Jim Moloshok, Warner Bros senior vice president, claimed that the distributor would support the show through its struggling ratings, citing the slow-to-build success of The Jenny Jones Show. However, Warner Bros Domestic Television Distribution later opted to prematurely conclude the show so that its replacement, The Rosie O'Donnell Show, could premiere in advance of the fall schedule.

== Reception ==
The show performed well among new talk shows; however, it underperformed compared to other established shows.
