= I Live for You (Chynna Phillips song) =

1996 single by Chynna Phillips

Single by Chynna Phillips

from the album Naked and Sacred
- B-side: "Life Ain't No Dress Rehearsal"
- Released: June 4, 1996
- Studio: Criteria (Miami, Florida); A&M (Hollywood, California)
- Length: 3:47
- Label: EMI
- Songwriters: Chynna Phillips; Desmond Child
- Producer: Desmond Child

Chynna Phillips singles chronology
| "Naked and Sacred" (1995) | "I Live for You" (1996) | "Remember Me" (1996) |

"I Live for You" is a song by American singer and actress Chynna Phillips, released as the second single from her debut solo album, Naked and Sacred. Phillips co-wrote the song with Desmond Child, who also produced the track. Released on June 4, 1996, the song failed to chart in the United States but became a top-10 hit in Australia, where it peaked at number nine in December 1996 and was certified gold by the Australian Recording Industry Association (ARIA). The song's music video was directed by Cameron Casey and Dermott Downs. "I Live for You" was featured in the 1996 erotic black comedy film Striptease, appearing on the film's soundtrack and in the film's ending credits.

== Release and reception ==
"I Live for You" was serviced to US contemporary hit radio on June 4, 1996. Reviewing the song for Billboard magazine, Larry Flick compared the song to Madonna's early works, noting that the song is a "far cry from the demure harmonies of Wilson Phillips". Upon its release, the song charted in Australia, where it debuted at number 44 on the ARIA Singles Chart on 4 August 1996. Over the next 15 weeks, the song rose and fell in the top 30 until reaching the top 10 on 24 November, peaking at number nine the following week. It stayed in the top 50 for eight more weeks, totaling 26 weeks on the chart to become Chynna Phillips' highest-peaking and longest-charting single in Australia. The ARIA certified the song gold and ranked it at number 49 on their 1996 year-end chart.

== Track listings ==
UK and Australian CD single

1. "I Live for You"
2. "Naked and Sacred" (classic club mix)
3. "Life Ain't No Dress Rehearsal"

Dutch CD single

1. "I Live for You"
2. "Life Ain't No Dress Rehearsal"

== Credits and personnel ==
Credits are lifted from the UK CD single liner notes.

Studios

- Recorded at Criteria Studios (Miami, Florida) and A&M Studios (Hollywood, California)
- Mixed at Sony Studios (New York City)

Personnel

- Chynna Phillips – writing
- Desmond Child – writing, production
- Mark Gruber – recording
- Chris Carroll – additional recording
- Matthew Gruber – additional recording
- Michael Bruer – mixing
- Brian Coleman – production management

== Charts ==
=== Weekly charts ===
| Chart (1996) | Peak position |
|---|---|
| Australia (ARIA) | 9 |

=== Year-end charts ===
| Chart (1996) | Position |
|---|---|
| Australia (ARIA) | 49 |

== Certifications ==
| Region | Certification | Certified units/sales |
|---|---|---|
| Australia (ARIA) | Gold | 35,000^{^} |
^{^} Shipments figures based on certification alone.
