= Chynna Phillips =

American singer (born 1968)

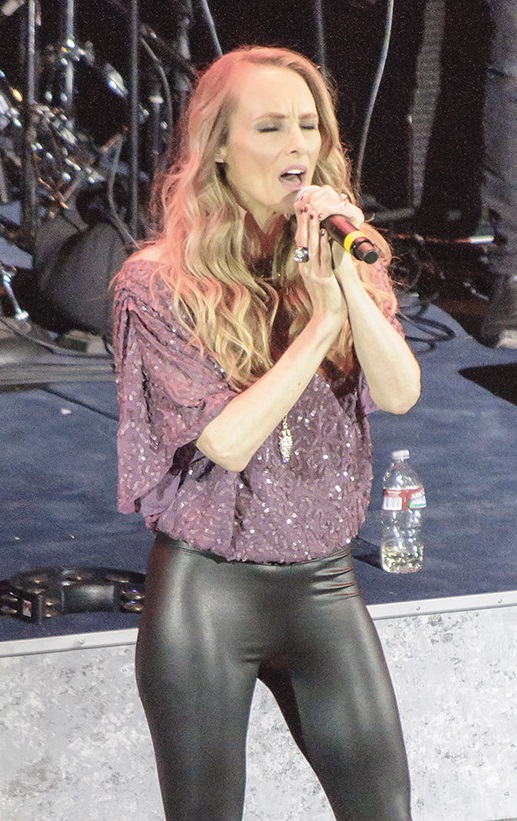
- Phillips in 2013
- Born: Chynna Gilliam Phillips; February 12, 1968 (age 58); Los Angeles, California, U.S.
- Other name: Chynna Phillips Baldwin
- Occupations: Singer; actress
- Years active: 1975–present
- Spouse: William Baldwin (m. 1995)
- Children: 3
- Parents: John Phillips (father); Michelle Phillips (mother)
- Relatives: Bijou Phillips (half-sister); Mackenzie Phillips (half-sister); Alec Baldwin (brother-in-law); Daniel Baldwin (brother-in-law); Stephen Baldwin (brother-in-law)
- Musical career
- Genre: Pop
- Instrument: Vocals
- Years active: 1989–present
- Labels: SBK; EMI
- Member of: Wilson Phillips

Chynna Gilliam Phillips (born February 12, 1968) is an American singer and actress. She is a member of the pop vocal trio Wilson Phillips and is the daughter of the Mamas & the Papas band members John and Michelle Phillips and half-sister of Mackenzie and Bijou Phillips.

== Early life and film work ==
Born in Los Angeles, Phillips began her career in acting. She appeared in films such as Some Kind of Wonderful, Caddyshack II, Say Anything and as the title character Roxanne Pulitzer in the 1989 television biographical film, Roxanne: The Prize Pulitzer. In 1995, she appeared as Kim MacAfee in the television film Bye Bye Birdie. Phillips voiced the character of Kitty along with her husband William Baldwin as Johnny 13 in Danny Phantom.

In 2011, Phillips was a contestant on the thirteenth season of Dancing with the Stars. Her professional partner was two-time finalist Tony Dovolani.

== Career ==
In 1989, Phillips formed the trio Wilson Phillips with her childhood friends Carnie and Wendy Wilson. The group released their self-titled debut album in 1990. The album would go on to sell eight million copies. The group's second album, Shadows and Light, released in 1992, was a commercial disappointment, despite being certified platinum.

In 1995, Phillips released her debut solo album, Naked and Sacred, but failed to recapture the success she found with Wilson Phillips. In 2004, Wilson Phillips reunited to record their third album, California. The album featured cover tunes from West Coast singers of the 1960s and 1970s.

In the October 15, 2007, issue of People magazine, she was said to be writing songs for a Christian album. She appeared in brother-in-law Stephen Baldwin's documentary, Livin It: Unusual Suspects. In 2009, Phillips teamed up with singer/songwriter Vaughan Penn to form the duo "Chynna and Vaughan". The two released their debut album, One Reason, on September 22, 2009. Wilson Phillips released Christmas In Harmony in 2010 and Dedicated in 2012. As of 2020, they continue to play shows every year.

In July 2016, Wilson Phillips reunited and performed on ABC's Greatest Hits.

== Personal life ==
Phillips had a drug and alcohol addiction as a teenager.

Phillips met actor William Baldwin of the acting Baldwin family in 1991 and has been married to him since 1995. Together, they have three children, two daughters and a son.

In September 2009 Chynna's half-sister, Mackenzie Phillips, alleged in her memoirs that she [Mackenzie] and her father had engaged in a ten-year incestuous relationship. While both Geneviève Waïte (John's wife at the time, and mother of Bijou Phillips) and Michelle Phillips (John's second wife, and mother of Chynna Phillips) told the media that they did not believe her claims, Chynna said she believed Mackenzie.

On February 12, 2010, Phillips was treated for anxiety. In a statement made on February 27, her manager Lizzie Grubman said, "After successfully completing her in-patient treatment for anxiety, Chynna Phillips has happily returned home to celebrate her daughter's birthday with her family." Grubman said Phillips was "happy to be home with her family. She is in great spirits."

In October 2019, Phillips revealed that her son had been diagnosed with cancer the year prior and was now in remission.

Beginning in November 2021, a sound clip from Phillips' appearance two months earlier on Celebrity Family Feud went viral on TikTok. While host Steve Harvey was attempting to explain the rules of the Fast Money round, Phillips repeatedly interrupted him by excitedly chanting the words "Holy Spirit, activate", ostensibly as a way to mentally prepare herself for the challenge. TikTok users typically lip synced and danced to the sound clip while portraying themselves in both fictional and real tough situations.

== Filmography ==
=== Film ===
Year	Film	Role	Notes
1975	Little Boy Blue		
1987	Some Kind of Wonderful	Mia	
1988	The Invisible Kid	Cindy Moore	
1988	Caddyshack II	Mary Frances "Miffy" Young	
1989	Say Anything...	Mimi	
2011	Bridesmaids	Herself	

=== Television ===
Year	Title	Role	Notes
1988	Moving Target	Megan Lawrence	Television film
1988	Goodbye, Miss July 4	Alma	Television film
1989	The Comeback	Jessica	Television film
1989	Traveling Man	Mona Voight	Television film
1989	Roxanne: The Prize Pulitzer	Roxanne Pulitzer	Television film
1995	Bye Bye Birdie	Kim MacAfee	Television film
2004–2007	Danny Phantom	Kitty	3 episodes

== Discography ==
Solo music. For her work in a group, see Wilson Phillips.

=== Albums ===
Title	Details	Peak chart positions
Title	Details	AUS
Naked and Sacred	Released: November 7, 1995; Label: EMI	35

=== Singles ===
Title	Year	Peak positions		Certifications	Album
Title	Year	AUS	UK	Certifications	Album
"Naked and Sacred"	1995	15	62		Naked and Sacred
"I Live for You"	1996	9	—	ARIA: Gold	Naked and Sacred
"Remember Me"	1996	—	—		Naked and Sacred
"Just to Hear You Say That You Love Me"	1996	64	—		Naked and Sacred
