= Chris Greeley =

American politician (1962–2023)

Member of the Maine House of Representatives from the 22nd district
- In office 2002–2010

Personal details
- Born: Christian David Greeley; May 16, 1962 Bangor, Maine, U.S.
- Died: March 9, 2023 (aged 60)
- Party: Republican
- Spouse: Donna Greeley
- Children: 3
- Occupation: Politician

Christian David Greeley (May 16, 1962 – March 9, 2023) was an American politician who was a representative in the Maine state legislature. He was a Republican. He represented District 22 in the House of Representatives for four consecutive two-year terms, from 2002 to 2010, at which point he was prohibited from running again by term limits.

== Early life ==
Chris Greeley was born in Bangor, Maine, on May 16, 1962. He was raised by his mother, Victoria Greeley, had two sisters, Melissa and Gabrielle, and spent his childhood on the "Greeley Farm" where his grandparents lived. He attended high school at John Bapst before graduating from Bangor High School. He later pursued his Associate’s Degree in Business at Eastern Maine Technical College. He graduated from the Maine Criminal Justice Academy in 1995.

== Career ==
Greeley was Cosmopolitan magazine's Bachelor-of-the-Month in June 1993, and as a result appeared (twice) on the John & Leeza Show, Sally Jesse Raphael Show, The Fox TV pilot for Carnie! and the movies Vacationland and A Sudden Loss of Gravity. While filming a TV show in Los Angeles, he was offered a job by Paramount Pictures. He also had roles in small, local commercials. In October 2019, he was featured on a Fox News segment by host Dana Perino. In December 2022 he was featured on News Nation's Morning in America. He has been mentioned on national radio by Howie Carr, Lars Larson, Phil Hendrie, and others. He was a TV weatherman for both NBC and CBS stations. Greeley appeared or was published in roughly a dozen national and regional magazines. He was the author of the CD, "From Terrified To Terrific! 7 Steps To Truly Fearless Public Speaking."

After graduating from the Maine Criminal Justice Academy, Greeley went on to serve Penobscot County as a Law Enforcement Officer in Veazie, Brewer, and Holden, where he was the Chief of Police from 2015 until his death. Greeley was known as an example of true community policing. He believed that creating trust between law enforcement and the public was crucial in building community. While serving as the Chief of Police, he founded the 25 Days of Kindness, which became a hallmark fundraiser, raising more than $25,000 last year. That money would be used to pay for fuel, food, rent, and other resources for those in need.

In June 2016, he was appointed by Governor Paul LePage to the Combat Sports Authority of Maine. Greeley attended Husson University and (was enrolled at) Mississippi State and was a graduate of Eastern Maine Community College and the Maine Criminal Justice Academy. He was a commencement speaker at Beal College, where he once also served on their Adjunct Faculty. He was a regular fill-in host on the radio for Blueberry Broadcasting.

In February 2021, he was recognized by the US Secret Service for his assistance with a visit to Maine by Donald Trump Jr. In 2016 he was Donald Trump's emcee, when he campaigned in Maine. Since 2015 he was chief of the Holden, Maine, Police Department.

== Personal life and death ==
Greeley taught himself to play guitar, and his personal passion was music. Additionally, he was an amateur boxer who also held a first degree black belt in Kempo karate. He was a Toughman Contest semi-finalist.

Greeley was married to Donna Greeley for 22 years and had one son and two daughters. He died on March 9, 2023, at the age of 60.
