= Christmas with Carnie =

Studio album by Carnie Wilson
- Released: October 2, 2007
- Recorded: 2007
- Studios: Bonus Track (Springfield, Tennessee); The Manor (Tarzana, California)
- Genres: Christmas; pop
- Length: 37:19
- Label: Big3 Records
- Producer: Richard Landis

Carnie Wilson chronology
A Mother's Gift: Lullabies From the Heart (2006)	Christmas with Carnie (2007)

Christmas with Carnie is a Christmas album by American pop singer Carnie Wilson, released in 2007. The album contains one new song, "Warm Lovin' Christmastime", a duet between Wilson and her husband Rob Bonfiglio, who wrote the song.

== Track listing ==
No.	Title	Writer(s)	Length
1.	"Merry Christmas Darling"	Richard Carpenter; Frank Pooler	3:19
2.	"Sleigh Ride"	Leroy Anderson; Mitchell Parish	2:28
3.	"Silent Night" (featuring Wendy Wilson)	Josef Mohr; Franz Gruber	3:37
4.	"Jingle Bells"	James Pierpont	2:48
5.	"I'll Be Home for Christmas"	Walter Kent	3:59
6.	"Warm Lovin' Christmastime" (duet with Rob Bonfiglio)	Bonfiglio	3:19
7.	"Blue Christmas"	Billy Hayes; Jay W. Johnson	3:26
8.	"Rudolph the Red-Nosed Reindeer"	Johnny Marks	2:30
9.	"White Christmas"	Irving Berlin	3:48
10.	"Santa Baby"	Joan Javits; Philip Springer; Tony Springer	2:39
11.	"Rockin' Around the Christmas Tree"	Marks	1:53
12.	"The Christmas Song"	Robert Wells; Mel Tormé	3:33
Total length:			37:19

== Personnel ==
- Carnie Wilson – lead and backing vocals, vocal arrangements
- Jimmy Nichols – keyboards, programming
- Rob Bonfiglio – guitars, rhythm arrangements, backing vocals (1), lead vocals (6)
- Biff Watson – acoustic guitars
- Owen Elliot Kugell – backing vocals (2, 11)
- Wendy Wilson – harmony vocals (3)
- The Honeys – backing vocals (4)

=== Production ===
- Bill Edwards – executive producer
- Tiffany Miller – executive producer
- Carnie Wilson – executive producer
- Richard Landis – producer
- Jimmy Nichols – engineer
- Robert Bonfiglio – vocal engineer
- Tony Green – mixing
- Austin Kyle – mix assistant
- Randy LeRoy – mastering at Final Stage Mastering (Nashville, Tennessee)
- Doug Catlin – graphic design
- Mark Russell – art direction, graphic design, photography
- Daniel Combs – hair stylist
