= California (Wilson Phillips album) =

Studio album by Wilson Phillips
- Released: May 25, 2004
- Recorded: 2003
- Genre: Rock; pop rock
- Length: 39:09
- Label: Columbia
- Producer: Peter Asher

Wilson Phillips chronology
Greatest Hits (2000)	California (2004)	Christmas in Harmony (2010)

Singles from California
- 1. "Go Your Own Way" Released: 2004; 2. "Already Gone" Released: 2004; 3. "Get Together" Released: 2004

Professional ratings
Review scores
Source	Rating
Allmusic	3.5/5 stars
Slant Magazine	2.5/5 stars

California is the third studio album and the first covers album by American female group Wilson Phillips. The group reunited in 2003 to record their first studio album in twelve years released by Columbia Records. The album peaked at #35 on the Billboard 200, and sold 31,000 copies during the first week of its release.

== Track listing ==
California
No.	Title	Writer(s)	Original artist	Length
1.	"You're No Good"	Clint Ballard Jr.	Dee Dee Warwick	3:14
2.	"Old Man"	Neil Young	Neil Young	4:00
3.	"California"	Joni Mitchell	Joni Mitchell	3:39
4.	"Already Gone"	Jack Tempchin; Robb Strandlund	Eagles	4:02
5.	"Go Your Own Way"	Lindsey Buckingham	Fleetwood Mac	3:41
6.	"Turn! Turn! Turn! (To Everything There Is a Season)"	Ecclesiastes; Pete Seeger	The Byrds	2:41
7.	"Monday Monday"	John Phillips	The Mamas & the Papas	3:17
8.	"Get Together"	Chet Powers	Chet Powers	3:46
9.	"Doctor My Eyes"	Jackson Browne	Jackson Browne	2:55
10.	"Dance Dance Dance"	Brian Wilson; Carl Wilson; Mike Love	The Beach Boys	2:02
11.	"In My Room"	B. Wilson; Gary Usher	The Beach Boys	1:53
Total length:				39:09

A "limited edition" was also released that featured a hidden track that is only listed on a sticker affixed to the CD case.

Limited edition hidden track
No.	Title	Writer(s)	Original artist	Length
12.	"Already Gone" (acoustic)	Tempchin; Strandlund	Eagles	3:48

== Personnel ==
Wilson Phillips

- Chynna Phillips – lead vocals (1, 4–7, 10, 11), backing vocals, vocal arrangements
- Carnie Wilson – lead vocals (2, 4–6, 8, 10, 11), backing vocals, additional keyboards (6), vocal arrangements
- Wendy Wilson – lead vocals (3–6, 9–11), backing vocals, vocal arrangements

Musicians

- Jon Gilutin – Hammond B3 organ (1, 4, 9)
- Roger Manning – Mellotron (1), acoustic piano (2, 7), Wurlitzer electric piano (9), Farfisa organ (10)
- Brian Wilson – acoustic piano (11), special guest vocals (11)
- Dean Parks – electric guitars (1, 3–5, 7–9), acoustic guitars (4, 6), mandolin (5), lead electric guitar (10)
- David Rolfe – fuzz bass (1), acoustic guitars (2, 3, 5, 8, 10), electric guitars (2, 7, 9), percussion programming (2, 10), acoustic hi-strung guitar (4)
- Dan Dugmore – pedal steel guitar (2, 3)
- Rob Bonfiglio – lead electric guitar (4), 12-string acoustic guitar (6, 10), baritone guitar (6), electric guitars (9)
- Larry Klein – bass (1–3, 5, 6)
- Leland Sklar – bass (4, 7–10)
- Russ Kunkel – drums (2–10), tambourine (4, 10), maracas (7), congas (9)
- Peter Asher – percussion programming (6, 10), additional percussion (9), sleigh bells (10)
- Jay Ruston – percussion programming (6)
- David Campbell – orchestral arrangements and conductor (3, 5, 7, 9, 10)
- Larry Corbett, Joel Derouin, Michele Richards and Evan Wilson – string quartet (2, 6, 8)
- Linda Ronstadt – special guest vocal sample (1)
- Owen Elliot – additional backing vocals (7)
- Dance Party Chorus on "Dance Dance Dance" – Peter Asher, Jameson Baldwin, Vance Baldwin, William Baldwin, Rob Bonfilogo, Maria Carcamo, Tiffany Miller, Chynna Phillips, Michelle Phillips, Jay Ruston, René Succa, Dave Way, Aron Wilson, Carnie Wilson and Wendy Wilson

== Production ==
- Executive Producers – Tiffany Miller and Sherratt Reicher
- Producer – Peter Asher
- Co-Producer – David Rolfe
- Additional Vocal Production – Wilson Phillips
- Tracks recorded by Nathaniel Kunkel, assisted by John Morrical.
- Vocals and Overdubs recorded by Jay Ruston, assisted by Tony Rambo.
- Pedal steel guitar recorded by George Massenburg, assisted by Leslie Richter.
- Strings recorded by Steve Churchyard, assisted by Jason Gossman.
- Mixing – Dave Way (Tracks 1, 2, 4, 6, 7, 9 & 10); Jay Ruston (Tracks 3, 5, 8 & 11).
- Recorded and Overdubbed at Conway Studios (Hollywood, California) and The Park Studios (Studio City, California).
- Mastered by Doug Sax and Robert Hadley at The Mastering Lab (Ojai, CA).
- A&R – Mitchell Cohen
- Liner Notes – Mitchell Cohen
- Production Coordinator – Brandi Whitmore
- Additional Coordination – Veronica Bekov and Mary Hogan
- Art Direction – Nancy Donald and Mary Maurer
- Design – Mary Maurer
- Photography – Sheryl Nields
- Illustration – Kevo Sassouni
- Music Contractor – Susie Katayama
- Music Copyist – Betty Ross-Blumer
- Management – Adam Epstein, Maggie Reinhart, David Simone and Winston Simone.

== Charts and certifications ==
=== Weekly charts ===
Chart (2004)	Peak position
New Zealand Albums Chart	9
UK Albums Chart	197
U.S. Billboard 200	35

=== Certifications ===
Country	Certification	Sales
United States	—	31,000+
