= Hey Santa! =

Studio album by Carnie & Wendy Wilson
- Released: October 5, 1993
- Recorded: 1976 ("I Saw Mommy Kissing Santa Claus"); 1993
- Studio: Conway Studios and Cherokee Studios (Hollywood, California); Devonshire Sound Studios and Schnee Studios (North Hollywood, California); Winsonic Studios, The Complex, Studio Ultimo, Westlake Studios and Record One (Los Angeles, California); O'Henry Sound Studios (Burbank, California); Can-Am Recorders (Tarzana, California); The Site (San Rafael, California)
- Genre: Christmas; pop; rock
- Length: 38:33
- Label: SBK
- Producer: Jack Kugell; Carnie Wilson; Marc Tanner; Robbie Buchanan; Al Jardine

Hey Santa! is a Christmas album recorded by Carnie & Wendy Wilson (SBK K2-27113). It was released in October 1993, and entered the Billboard Top Pop Albums chart on Christmas Day, 1993. The album was the first album recorded by the Wilson sisters after the group Wilson Phillips went on hiatus.

The album was not a commercial success, peaking at #116 on the Billboard Top Pop Albums chart, and reaching #25 on the Top Holiday Albums chart. The track listing for the album consists of eleven Christmas standards, plus the original title track, "Hey Santa!", written by the Wilson sisters and Jack Kugell.

The title track is about a man returning home to his love on Christmas, after his love wished that Santa would "bring [her] baby home tonight." SBK Records released one single to radio and retail. "Hey Santa!", backed with their cover version of "Have Yourself a Merry Little Christmas", was issued on cassette single and on a green vinyl 45 rpm, SBK S7-17648-A, and reached #22 on the Billboard Top Adult Contemporary chart. It also reached #1 on the Billboard Bubbling Under the Hot 100 chart, often shown as #101 on the Hot 100 in Billboard reference books. Despite being a commercial failure, the single still receives recurrent airplay during the Christmas holiday season. Carl Wilson, Carnie and Wendy's uncle and a Beach Boys founding member, features prominently in the backing vocal.

The album also features a Wilson family recording from 1977 of "I Saw Mommy Kissing Santa Claus" that features the Beach Boys on backing vocals and a wide range of Beach Boys band members' children, including Matthew and Adam Jardine, Hailey and Christian Love, and Jonah and Justyn Wilson. It was scheduled to be released on the 1977 album Merry Christmas from the Beach Boys.

Hey Santa! was later reissued with the same content and a two-page booklet without lyrics in 1999 with the catalog number 98289 by EMI/Capitol Special Markets on both CD and cassette. As of November 2007, this version of Hey Santa! is still available.

As of June 27, 2012, Hey Santa! has sold 138,747 copies in the U.S., according to SoundScan.

Other Christmas albums have followed a decade later. In 2007, Carnie Wilson released a solo Christmas album, Christmas with Carnie, that features new versions of many of the same songs. Then, in 2010, Wilson Phillips, back together in the music business as a group, released Christmas in Harmony, which also features new versions of a few songs used before.

== Track listing ==
No.	Title	Writer(s)	Producer(s)	Length
1.	"Hey Santa!"	Jack Kugell; Carnie Wilson; Wendy Wilson	Kugell; C. Wilson	4:37
2.	"Let It Snow, Let It Snow, Let it Snow"	Jule Styne; Sammy Cahn	Marc Tanner; C. Wilson	3:36
3.	"Rudolph, the Red Nosed Reindeer"	Johnny Marks	Kugell; C. Wilson	2:54
4.	"Winter Wonderland"	Felix Bernard; Richard B. Smith	Robbie Buchanan; C. Wilson	3:46
5.	"The Little Drummer Boy"	Katherine Kennicott Davis; Henry V. Oronati; Harry Simeone	Tanner; C. Wilson	4:17
6.	"Have Yourself a Merry Little Christmas"	Ralph Blane; Hugh Martin	Kugell; C. Wilson	4:34
7.	"Jingle Bell Rock"	Joseph Carleton Beal; James Ross Boothe	Buchanan; C. Wilson	2:17
8.	"Silver Bells"	Jay Livingston; Ray Evans	Buchanan; C. Wilson	4:37
9.	"Christmas Medley: We Three Kings of Orient Are / Silent Night / The First Noel"	Traditional	Buchanan; C. Wilson	6:45
10.	"I Saw Mommy Kissing Santa Claus"	Tommie Connor	Al Jardine	1:10
Total length:				38:33

== Personnel ==
- Carnie Wilson – lead vocals (1, 2, 4, 6, 10), backing vocals (1), vocals (5, 9), arrangements (9)
- Wendy Wilson – lead vocals (1, 3, 7, 8, 10), backing vocals (1), vocals (5, 9), arrangements (9)
- Greg Phillinganes – acoustic piano (1), keyboards (1)
- Jack Kugell – additional keyboards (1), arrangements (1, 3, 6)
- Paul Mirkovich – keyboards (2, 3, 5), acoustic piano (2)
- Robbie Buchanan – keyboards (4, 8, 9), arrangements (4, 7–9)
- Randy Waldman – keyboards (6)
- Brian Wilson – acoustic piano (10)
- Josh Sklair – guitar (1)
- Carl Bartoles – additional guitar (1)
- Tommy Girvin – guitar (2, 5)
- Michael Landau – guitar (2, 4, 5, 7, 8)
- Brett Garsed – guitar (3)
- Dean Parks – guitar (3, 6, 7, 9)
- Jimmy Johnson – bass guitar (1, 3)
- Leland Sklar – bass guitar (2, 5, 7)
- Chuck Domanico – string bass (6)
- Russ Kunkel – drums (1, 4, 7, 8)
- Mike Baird – drums (2, 3, 5)
- John Guerin – drums (6)
- Nathaniel Kunkel – percussion (1)
- Michael Fisher – percussion (2, 4, 5, 7, 8)
- Dan Higgins – alto saxophone (1)
- Tommy Morgan – harmonica (2)
- David Duke – flugelhorn (6, 9)
- Marc Tanner – arrangements (2, 5)
- Jeremy Lubbock – arrangements (9)
- Joanna Harwood – backing vocals (1, 10)
- Carl Wilson – backing vocals (1)
- Ascension Lutheran Singers – choir (1)
- Jennifer Gonzalez, Nanase Imai, Konomi Irie, Madoki Irie, Jon Pelletier and Joy Pelletier – additional choir (1)
- Carla Pelletier – choir director (1)
- The Honeys – backing vocals (3)
- Sally Dworsky – backing vocals (7)
- Edie Lehmann – backing vocals (7)
- Rick Nelson – backing vocals (7)
- Jeff Pescetto – backing vocals (7)
- The Beach Boys – backing vocals (10)
- Adam and Matt Jardine, Christian and Hailey Love, Jonah and Justyn Wilson – lead vocals (10)

String section (Tracks 6 & 9)

- Jeremy Lubbock – arrangements and conductor
- Jules Chaikin – contractor
- Assa Drori – concertmaster
- Larry Corbett, Dennis Karmazyn, Suzie Katayama, Ray Kelley, Ron Leonard, David Shamban and Daniel Smith – cello
- Edward Mears, Buell Neidlinger and Margaret Storer – double bass
- Gayle Levant – harp
- Marilyn Baker, Samuel Boghossian, Kenneth Burward-Hoy, Margot MacLaine, Jimbo Ross and Evan Wilson – viola
- Israel Baker, Ron Clark, Joel Derouin, Assa Drori, Henry Ferber, Ronald Folsom, Juliann French, Mirian Kojian, Gordon Marrin, Donald Palmer, Kwihee Shamban, Haim Shtrum, Mara Tsumura, Miwako Watanabe, Elizabeth Wilson and Shari Zippert – violin

== Production ==
- Jay Landers – executive producer
- Carnie Wilson – co-producer (1–9)
- Jack Kugell – producer (1, 3, 6)
- Marc Tanner – producer (2, 5)
- Robbie Buchanan – producer (4, 7–9)
- Al Jardine – producer (10)
- Patty Nichols – project coordinator (1–3, 5, 6)
- Ivy Skoff – project coordinator (1, 4, 7–9)
- Brett Perry – project coordinator (4, 7–9)
- Henry Marquez – art direction
- Brian Jackson – design
- Larry Vigon – design
- Deborah Feingold – photography
- Robert Tran – background photography
- Mickey Shapiro – management

Technical

- Doug Sax – mastering at The Mastering Lab (Hollywood, California)
- Nathaniel Kunkel – recording (1), engineer (3)
- Mick Guzauski – mixing (1, 3, 6)
- Bill Drescher – track recording (2, 5), mixing (2, 5)
- Mark Green – engineer (2, 5)
- Paul McKenna – recording (4, 8)
- Jeremy Smith – recording (4, 8), additional engineer (7), additional recording (9)
- Frank Wolf – recording (4, 8, 9), additional engineer (7), additional recording (9)
- George Massenburg – drum recording (4, 8), recording (7)
- Bill Schnee – mixing (4, 7–9)
- Allen Sides – engineer (6)
- Chad Blinman – second engineer (1)
- Gil Morales – second engineer (1, 3)
- Marnie Riley – second engineer (1)
- Alex Rodriguez – second engineer (1)
- Tom Biener – second engineer (2, 3, 5), recording (4), assistant engineer (4, 8), engineer (6)
- John Jackson – second engineer (2, 5)
- Scott Ralston – second engineer (2, 5)
- Kevin Scott – recording assistant (4, 7, 8)
- Jeff Graham – assistant engineer (4, 8, 9), second engineer (6)
- Mitch Zelenzy – assistant engineer (4, 8, 9)
- John Hendrickson – mix assistant (4, 9)
- John Fundingsland – second engineer (5)
- Richard Landers – second engineer (6), recording assistant (9)
- Rail Rogut – mix assistant (7, 8)
- Jeff Shannon – recording assistant (9)
