= Wendy Wilson =

American pop singer (born 1969)

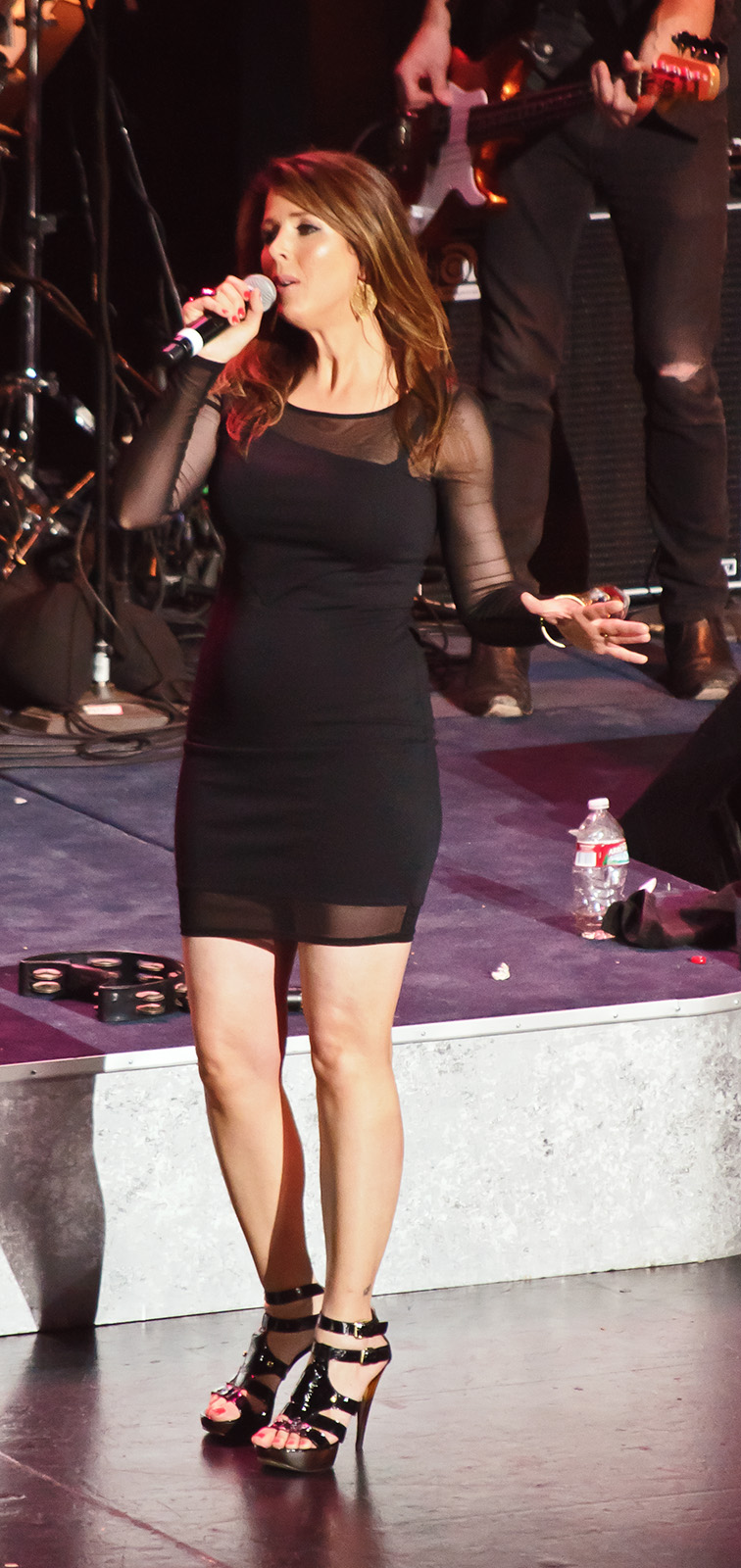
- Wilson performing in 2013
- Born: October 16, 1969 (age 56); Los Angeles, California, U.S.
- Occupations: Singer; television personality
- Years active: 1989–present
- Spouse: Daniel Knutson (m. 2002)
- Children: 4
- Parents: Brian Wilson (father); Marilyn Wilson-Rutherford (mother)
- Relatives: Carnie Wilson (sister); Dennis Wilson (uncle); Carl Wilson (uncle); Murry Wilson (grandfather)
- Musical career
- Genres: Pop
- Member of: Wilson Phillips

Wendy Wilson (born October 16, 1969) is an American singer and television personality who is a member of the pop trio Wilson Phillips. She co-founded Wilson Phillips with her older sister, Carnie, and childhood friend Chynna Phillips in 1989. Wilson Phillips released two albums in 1990 and 1992 before splitting up. Wendy and Carnie released a Christmas album together in 1993, and an album called The Wilsons in 1997, with their formerly estranged father, Brian.

In 2004, Wendy reunited with Carnie and Phillips for a third Wilson Phillips album, California. In 2012, the reunited Wilson Phillips released the album Dedicated, which comprised covers of songs by The Beach Boys and The Mamas & the Papas. In June 2012, Wendy joined her sister Carnie and other members of the Beach Boys' families to form the vocal group, California Saga, which performed at the intermission during the homecoming Hollywood Bowl show of the Beach Boys' 50th anniversary tour.

== Family ==
Born in Los Angeles, Wendy Wilson is the second daughter of Beach Boys founder Brian Wilson and his first wife Marilyn. Her mother is of Jewish heritage, while her father was of Dutch, Scottish, English, German, Irish, and Swedish ancestry.

Wilson married record producer/sound engineer Daniel Knutson on May 24, 2002, in the rose garden of the Ritz-Carlton in Marina Del Rey. They have four sons: Leo (born September 14, 2003), Beau (born, September 23, 2004), and twins Will and Jesse (born August 17, 2007).

== Television appearances ==
In February 2008, Wilson appeared in an episode of the American reality television program Supernanny. Her sister Carnie and her niece Lola Bonfiglio also made an appearance in the episode. In April 2008, Wilson appeared in an episode of the Tyra Banks show Amazing Moms.

On January 7, 2010, Wilson appeared with her sister, their mother Marilyn, and their husbands on a special edition of The Newlywed Game.

In 2012, Wilson Phillips created a reality television show called: Wilson Phillips: Still Holding On. The show premiered on TV Guide.

In July 2016, Wilson Phillips reunited and performed on ABC's Greatest Hits.

== Musical career ==
- 1990: Wilson Phillips – Wilson Phillips
- 1991: Wilson Phillips – Two Rooms (Elton John tribute album): song "Daniel"
- 1992: Wilson Phillips – Shadows and Light
- 1993: Wendy & Carnie Wilson – Hey Santa!
- 1993: Wendy Wilson VA "Home" (Children's songs): her song "Jennifer"
- 1997: The Wilsons – The Wilsons
- 1998: Wilson Phillips – The Best of Wilson Phillips
- 1998: Wendy & Carnie Wilson in Various Artists Love Shouldn't Hurt
- 2000: Wilson Phillips – Greatest Hits (Capitol Records)
- 2002: Wendy & Carnie Wilson in Al Jardine Family and Friends – Live in Las Vegas
- 2004: Wilson Phillips – California
- 2005: Wilson Phillips – The Best of Wilson Phillips (same as 1998 release)
- 2007: Wendy & Carnie Wilson VA A Song for My Father : song "Warmth of the Sun"
- 2010: Wilson Phillips – Christmas in Harmony
- 2012: Wilson Phillips – Dedicated
