= Greatest Hits (TV series) =

- Written by: David Wild
- Directed by: Leon Knoles
- Creative director: Kenneth Ehrlich
- Presented by: Arsenio Hall; Kelsea Ballerini
- Country of origin: United States
- No. of seasons: 1
- No. of episodes: 6

Production
- Executive producers: Kenneth Ehrlich; Raj Kapoor; James McKinlay
- Producers: David Wild; Renato Basile
- Editor: David W. Foster
- Production companies: AEG; Ehrlich Ventures, LLC

Original release
- Network: ABC
- Release: June 30 – August 4, 2016

Greatest Hits is an American television program on the ABC network that aired from June 30 to August 4, 2016, featuring famous musical performers from the 1980s, 1990s and 2000s. The show was hosted by Arsenio Hall and Kelsea Ballerini.

== Episodes ==
All songs are listed in order of the episodes.

No. overall	No. in season	Title	Directed by	Original release date
1	1	"Greatest Hits: 1980–1985"	Unknown	June 30, 2016
Performers: Pitbull, REO Speedwagon, Ray Parker Jr., Jason Derulo, Kenny Loggins, Kim Carnes, Rick Springfield and Kool & The Gang. Opening Song: "Ain't Too Cool" by LunchMoney Lewis. Songs: "Footloose" by Kenny Loggins, "Human Nature" by Jason Derulo (a Tribute to Michael Jackson), "Ghostbusters" by Ray Parker, Jr., "Jessie's Girl" by Rick Springfield, "Keep On Loving You" by REO Speedwagon, "Messin' Around" by Pitbull with REO Speedwagon, "Bette Davis Eyes" by Kim Carnes, and "Celebration" by Kool & The Gang. Music Video: "Physical" by Olivia Newton-John.
2	2	"Greatest Hits: 1995–2000"	Unknown	July 7, 2016
Performers: Backstreet Boys, Meghan Trainor, Coolio, CeeLo Green, Jewel, Tori Kelly, LL Cool J, Wiz Khalifa, DJ Z-Trip, Hanson and Echosmith. Opening Song: "I Swear" by All-4-One. Songs: "Everybody (Backstreet's Back)" by Backstreet Boys, "Gangsta's Paradise" by Coolio with CeeLo Green, "You Were Meant for Me" by Jewel with Tori Kelly, "Loungin" by LL Cool J with Wiz Khalifa singing "We Dem Boyz" with help form DJ Z-Trip, "MMMBop" by Hanson, "Thinking 'Bout Somethin'" by Hanson with Echosmith, "I Want It That Way" by Backstreet Boys with Meghan Trainor. Music Video: "No Rain" by Blind Melon.
3	3	"Greatest Hits: 1985–1990"	Unknown	July 14, 2016
Performers: Bret Michaels, Kenny Loggins, Miguel, Wilson Phillips, Grace Potter, Chicago, Aloe Blacc, Foreigner, and Nate Ruess. Songs: "Nothin' but a Good Time" by Bret Michaels, "Look Away" and "You're the Inspiration" by Chicago with Aloe Blacc, "Higher Love" by Miguel (a Tribute to Steve Winwood), "Hold On" by Wilson Phillips, "You Give Love a Bad Name" by Grace Potter (a Tribute to Bon Jovi), "I Want to Know What Love Is" by Foreigner with Nate Ruess, "Danger Zone" by Kenny Loggins, "Every Rose Has Its Thorn" by Bret Michaels. Music Video: "Here I Go Again" by Whitesnake.
4	4	"Greatest Hits: 1990–1995"	Unknown	July 21, 2016
Performers: Boyz II Men, En Vogue, Montell Jordan, Seal, Bonnie Raitt, Andra Day, Alessia Cara, and Little Big Town. Songs: "Free Your Mind" by En Vogue, "Kiss from a Rose" by Seal, "This Is How We Do It" by Montell Jordan, "Wonderwall" by Little Big Town (a Tribute to Oasis), "Love Sneakin' Up On You" by Bonnie Raitt with Andra Day, "Rise Up" by Andra Day with Bonnie Raitt, "One" by Alessia Cara (a Tribute to U2), "Motownphilly" by Boyz II Men. Music Video: "On Bended Knee" by Boyz II Men.
5	5	"Greatest Hits: 2000–2005"	Unknown	July 28, 2016
Performers: Fifth Harmony, Kelsea Ballerini, Little Big Town, Mario, Zendaya, Lee Ann Womack, Rachel Platten, Pat Monahan, and Kenny Loggins. Opening Song: "Soak Up the Sun" by Little Big Town (a Tribute to Sheryl Crow). Songs: "Say My Name", "Independent Women", "Bootylicious" and "Survivor" by Fifth Harmony (a Tribute/Medley to Destiny's Child songs), "Let Me Love You" by Mario with Zendaya, "Calling All Angels" by Pat Monahan with Kenny Loggins singing "This Is It", "Fallin'" by Little Big Town (a Tribute to Alicia Keys), "Man! I Feel Like a Woman!" / "This Love" / "...Baby One More Time" by Kelsea Ballerini (a Tribute to Shania Twain / Maroon 5 / Britney Spears), "I Hope You Dance" by Lee Ann Womack with Rachel Platten singing "Stand by You".
6	6	"Greatest Hits Live Finale: 1980–2005"	Unknown	August 4, 2016
Performers: Smash Mouth, Hunter Hayes, Richard Marx, Nelly, Kelsea Ballerini, Flo Rida, Colin Hay, John Legend, En Vogue, New Edition, Sheryl Crow, Adam Lambert, Ariana Grande, and Celine Dion. Songs: "How Will I Know" and "Queen of the Night" by Ariana Grande (a Tribute to Whitney Houston), "Faith" by Adam Lambert (a Tribute to George Michael), "If It Isn't Love", "Sensitivity", "Rub You the Right Way" and "Poison" by New Edition, "All I Wanna Do" by Sheryl Crow with Kelsea Ballerini, My Lovin' (You're Never Gonna Get It) by En Vogue, "My Heart Will Go On" by Celine Dion, "My House" by Flo Rida (a Tribute to Run–D.M.C.), "Don't Mean Nothing" by Richard Marx, "Down Under" by Colin Hay, "Doo Wop (That Thing)" and "Ex-Factor" by John Legend (a Tribute to Lauryn Hill), "All Star" by Smash Mouth with Hunter Hayes, "Ride wit Me" and "Hot in Herre" by Nelly. Winning Era: 1980–1985
