= J. J. Johnston =

American actor (1933–2022)

- Born: James William Johnston; October 24, 1933; Chicago, Illinois, U.S.
- Died: November 4, 2022 (aged 89)
- Occupations: Actor, writer, historian
- Years active: 1972–2018

J.J. Johnston (born James William Johnston, October 24, 1933 – November 4, 2022) was an American theatre and film actor, boxing historian and writer.

Johnston died on November 4, 2022, at the age of 89.

== Books ==
Johnston, a former amateur boxer, was the author of several books on the history of boxing.

- Babyface and Pop, with Nick Beck (2011)
- Chicago Boxing (Images of Sports), with Sean Curtin and David Mamet (2005) ISBN 978-0-7385-3210-3
- Chicago Amateur Boxing (Images of Sports), with Sean Curtin (2006) ISBN 978-0-7385-4138-9

== Stage work ==
Johnston performed in the original 1975 production of David Mamet's American Buffalo in Chicago and subsequently performed in the 1983 Broadway production opposite Al Pacino.

== Filmography ==
=== Film ===
Year	Title	Role
1972	Beware! The Blob	Deputy Kelly Davis
1978	Towing	Butch
1981	Whose Life Is It Anyway?	Guard
1987	Penitentiary III	Announcer #1
1987	Fatal Attraction	O'Rourke
1987	The Principal	Will
1987	Weeds	Lazarus
1988	Stars and Bars	The Doorman
1988	Things Change	Frankie
1988	976-EVIL	Virgil
1989	An Innocent Man	Joseph Donatelli
1991	Queens Logic	Joey "Clams"
1991	Homicide	Jilly Curran
1991	JFK	Joe, Mobster with Broussard
1993	Mad Dog and Glory	Shanlon
1994	Body Shot	Magruder
1994	Desert Steel	Buck Edwards
1994	Stranger by Night	Bobby's Father
1994	The Fence	Railroad Worker #1
1995	Above Suspicion	Hank
1997	The Spanish Prisoner	The Doorman
1998	Simon Says	Mr. Sands
1999	K-911	Tommy "Fat Tommy"
2000	Fallen Arches	Stuart
2000	Lakeboat	Stan
2000	State and Main	The Stationmaster
2000	The Prime Gig	Lloyd
2001	Dead Man's Run	Detective #1
2002	Hitters	Nano
2004	Spartan	Night Club Manager
2004	A Lousy Ten Grand	Roy
2005	Break a Leg	Detective Coyle
2008	Redbelt	The Ring Announcer

=== Television ===
Year	Title	Role	Notes
1986	The Equalizer	Frank	Episode: "Shades of Darkness"
1996	Wings	Mr. DeCarlo	Episode: "Driving Mr. DeCarlo"
1996	Married... with Children	Drill Instructor	Episode: "T*R*A*S*H"
2001	The King of Queens	Chic	Episode: "Papa Pill"

== Awards ==
- 1983-84 New York Theatre World Award for Outstanding New Talent in "American Buffalo"
- 1986 Bay Area Critics Award for Outstanding Supporting Performance by an Actor in the play Glengarry Glen Ross.
