= Aesthetic distance =

Gap between reality and a work's fictional world

Aesthetic distance is a concept used in both fiction and therapy to describe a perceived emotional distance between an observer and another entity, such as a fictional world or character.

In art and literature, it refers to the gap between a viewer's conscious reality and the fictional reality presented in a work of art. When a reader becomes fully immersed in the narrative world of a book, the author has achieved a close aesthetic distance. If the author pulls the reader out from the reality of the story, reminding the reader they are reading a book, the author is said to have "violated the aesthetic distance."

In psychotherapy and drama therapy, aesthetic distance refers to the ideal balance between emotional over-involvement (under-distance) and emotional detachment (over-distance). The achievement of aesthetic distance is effective for catharsis, a release of emotions.

== Origin ==
The concept originates from Immanuel Kant's Critique of Judgement, where he establishes the notion of disinterested delight which does not depend on the subject's having a desire for the object itself, he writes, "delight in beautiful art does not, in the pure judgement of taste, involve an immediate interest. [...] it is not the object that is of immediate interest, but rather the inherent character of the beauty qualifying it for such a partnership-a character, therefore, that belongs to the very essence of beauty."

Edward Bullough conceptualized "psychial distance" in an article in 1912. In that article, he begins with the image of a passenger on a ship observing fog at sea. If the passenger thinks of the fog in terms of danger to the ship, the experience is not aesthetic, but to regard the beautiful scene in detached wonder is to take legitimate aesthetic attitude. One must feel, but not too much. Bullough writes, "Distance … is obtained by separating the object and its appeal from one's own self, by putting it out of gear with practical needs and ends. Thereby the 'contemplation' of the object becomes alone possible."

Bullough's ideas were expanded upon by sociologist Thomas Scheff, who coined the term "aesthetic distance" in 1981 to describe the midpoint between emotional detachment and emotional overwhelm in a therapeutic setting. These concepts were then expanded upon and applied to drama therapy by Robert Landy, who applied distancing to different roles within a drama.

== Aesthetic distance in fiction ==
Authors of film, fiction, drama, and poetry evoke different levels of aesthetic distance. For instance, William Faulkner tends to invoke a close aesthetic distance by using first-person narrative and stream of consciousness, while Ernest Hemingway tends to invoke a greater aesthetic distance from the reader through use of third person narrative.

Anything that pulls a viewer out of the reality of a work of fiction is said to be a violation of aesthetic distance. An easy example in theater or film is "breaking the fourth wall," when characters suspend the progress of the story to speak directly to the audience. When the aesthetic distance is deliberately violated in theater, it is known as the distancing effect, or Verfremdungseffekt, a concept coined by playwright Bertolt Brecht.

Many examples of violating the aesthetic distance may also be found in meta-fiction. William Goldman, in The Princess Bride, repeatedly interrupts his own fairy tale to speak directly to the reader. In the musical, Stop the World I Want to Get Off, the protagonist, Littlechap, periodically stops the progress of the play to address the audience directly.

In film, the aesthetic distance is often violated unintentionally. Examples might include a director's cameo, poor special effects, or perhaps blatant product placement - any can be enough to pull a viewer out of the reality of the film. David Mamet in On Directing Film asserts that any direct depiction of graphic sex or violence in film is an inherent violation of aesthetic distance, as audience members will instinctively make judgments as to whether or not what they just saw was real, and thus be pulled out of the story-telling.

== Aesthetic distance in therapy ==
Aesthetic distance in therapeutic settings refers to the ideal balance of emotional engagement. Achieving this balance allows a person to both think and feel at an appropriate level without thoughts or feelings overshadowing each other, described by Scheff as "a balance of thought and feeling". Aesthetic distance involves feeling both danger of the stimuli being confronted and safety from it, making it particularly conducive to therapeutic healing from difficult emotions like grief and trauma.

Aesthetic distance does not have to be a static balance, but can entail an effective movement between over- and under-distance. Over-distancing refers to emotional detachment, whereas under-distance entails an overwhelm of emotion; both are ineffective for catharsis. In drama therapy, the emotional distance is typically with a role.

== See also ==
- Distancing effect
- Suspension of disbelief
- Fourth wall
- Drama therapy
