= True and false (disambiguation) =

True and false are values indicating the relation of a proposition to truth.

True and false may also refer to:

- True and False: Heresy and Common Sense for the Actor, a 1997 book
- true and false (commands), Unix commands
- True self and false self, psychological concepts

== See also ==
- True (disambiguation)
- False (disambiguation)
- False or True, a children's TV programme 1993–1996
