= Prairie du Chien (play) =

Prairie du Chien is a play in one act by David Mamet. It was originally conceived of as a radio play and was premiered on National Public Radio in 1978. The work was first performed on stage in December 1985 at the Mitzi E. Newhouse Theater, Lincoln Center in a double bill with Mamet's The Shawl with Gregory Mosher directing both plays. The cast included Jerry Stiller as the Storyteller, Tom Signorelli as the Card Dealer, William H. Macy as the Gin Player, Brad Hall as the Listener, Christopher Jennings as the Listener's son, and Paul Butler as the Porter. In 2011 the play was staged at the Arcola Theatre in London in a double bill with Mamet's Lakeboat.

== Plot ==
Setting: A train traveling from Chicago to Duluth at night.

The play revolves around two separate pairs on a train who initially do not interact. The first is the Card Dealer and the Gin Player who are absorbed in their game of gin. The other is the Storyteller and the Listener; the latter of which is accompanied by his son who is fast asleep. The storyteller tells a tale of murder with supernatural undertones. Meanwhile, the Gin Player becomes convinced the Card Dealer is cheating, and a violent altercation ensues finally bringing both groups into the scene together. The play ends with a gun shot executed by the Gin Player.
