= Ed O'Neill =

American actor (born 1946)

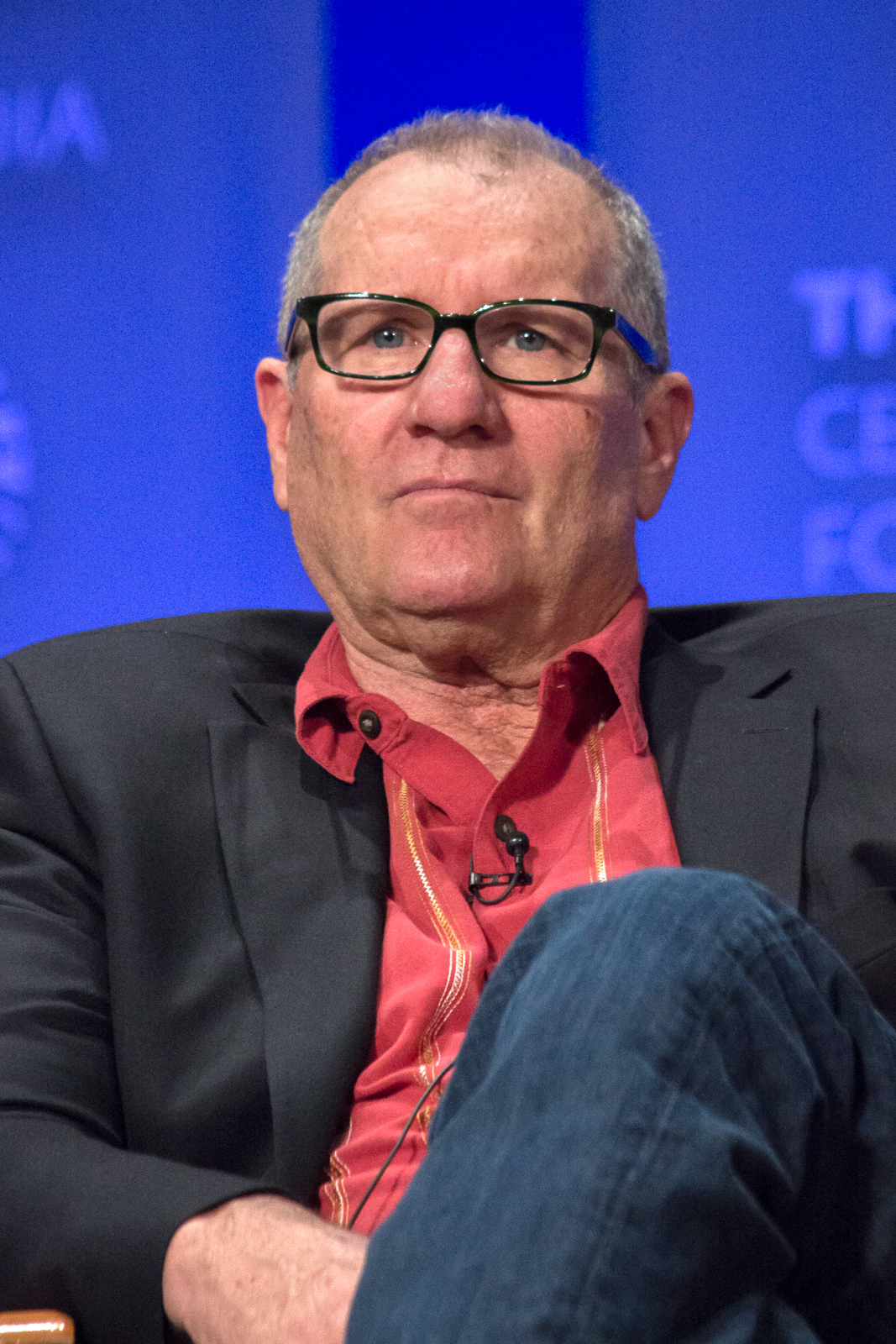
- O'Neill at the 2015 PaleyFest
- Born: Edward Leonard O'Neill; April 12, 1946 (age 80); Youngstown, Ohio, U.S.
- Occupations: Actor; comedian; football player
- Years active: 1967–present
- Spouse: Catherine Rusoff (m. 1986)
- Children: 2
- Football career

Profile
- Position: Defensive lineman

Personal information
- Listed height: 6 ft 1 in (1.85 m)

Career information
- High school: Ursuline (Youngstown, Ohio)
- College: Ohio; Youngstown State (1967–1968)
- NFL draft: 1969: undrafted

Career history
- Pittsburgh Steelers (1969)*
- * Offseason or practice squad member only

Edward Leonard O'Neill (born April 12, 1946) is an American actor, comedian, and former football player. Over his career, he has earned four Screen Actors Guild Awards as well as nominations for three Primetime Emmy Awards and two Golden Globe Awards.

O'Neill gained stardom in the late 1980s for playing a working class father, Al Bundy, on the Fox sitcom Married... with Children (1987–1997) for which he was nominated for the Golden Globe Award for Best Actor – Television Series Musical or Comedy twice. He had a career resurgence in the 2010s for portraying the family patriarch Jay Pritchett on the award-winning ABC sitcom Modern Family (2009–2020), for which he was nominated for three Primetime Emmy Awards for Outstanding Actor in a Comedy Series and won four Screen Actors Guild Awards for Outstanding Ensemble in a Comedy Series.

On film, O'Neill made his debut in William Friedkin's crime thriller Cruising (1980). He has since appeared in Dutch (1991), Wayne's World (1992), Little Giants (1994), Prefontaine (1997), The Spanish Prisoner (1997), The Bone Collector (1999), Sun Dogs (2017) and The Last Shift (2020). He has done voice work for the animated films Wreck-It Ralph (2012), Finding Dory (2016) and Ralph Breaks the Internet (2018).

== Early life and education ==
Ed O'Neill was born into an Irish-American Catholic family in Youngstown, Ohio, on April 12, 1946. Both sides of his family are the descendants of Irish immigrants who came to the United States in the 1850s.

His mother, Ruth Quinlan O'Neill, was a homemaker and social worker, and his father, Edward Phillip O'Neill (1921–2008), was a steel mill worker and truck driver. O'Neill attended Ursuline High School where he played football. At 14, he worked in construction, then at a steel mill.

He was awarded a football scholarship to Ohio University, where he majored in history, and was a member of the Mu chapter of the Delta Tau Delta fraternity. He left the university after his sophomore year. He admits he spent more time playing sports and partying than studying. He also feuded with his coach.

He transferred to Youngstown State University, where he lettered as a defensive lineman from 1967 to 1968. While at Youngstown State, he played in a game against Roger Staubach, who was playing for the Pensacola Naval Station. O'Neill said that his team was penalized 15 yards when he hit Staubach out of bounds.

== Professional football career ==
O'Neill was signed as an undrafted free agent by the Pittsburgh Steelers in 1969 under rookie head coach Chuck Noll but was cut in training camp, having to compete with fellow rookie defensive linemen Joe Greene and L.C. Greenwood for a roster spot. Both became key members of the Steel Curtain defense during the Steelers success in the 1970s.

Later, on Married... with Children, O'Neill played a former high school football star who had failed to make it big and frequently reminisced about his "glory days" at Polk High ("I once scored four touchdowns in a single game").

O'Neill worked as a substitute social studies teacher at his alma mater Ursuline High School before becoming an actor.

== Acting career ==
=== 1979–1986: Early acting roles ===
O'Neill re-enrolled at Youngstown State after being cut by the Steelers and was one of the first students at the school's new theater program. Later, in 1979, he played a boxer opposite Danny Aiello in the Broadway play Knockout at the Helen Hayes Theatre. Richard Eder of The New York Times described the performance as "chilling" adding, "As Paddy Klonski, the brutal young boxer, Edward O'Neill's towering physique, peaceful smile and empty eyes form a genuinely frightening presence". It was there that he was seen by director William Friedkin and landed his first movie role, as a police detective in Cruising, starring Al Pacino.

In 1985, O'Neill appeared in a Red Lobster commercial. He made a brief guest appearance in The Equalizer. In 1986, he was cast as NYPD detective Jimmy "Popeye" Doyle for the planned television series Popeye Doyle. The character had originally appeared in the motion picture The French Connection (played by Gene Hackman). The two-hour made-for-television movie/pilot was filmed and shown on network television. O'Neill received good reviews for his performance, and the pilot received positive ratings, but the series was not picked up for production.

=== 1987–2008: Married with Children and other roles ===
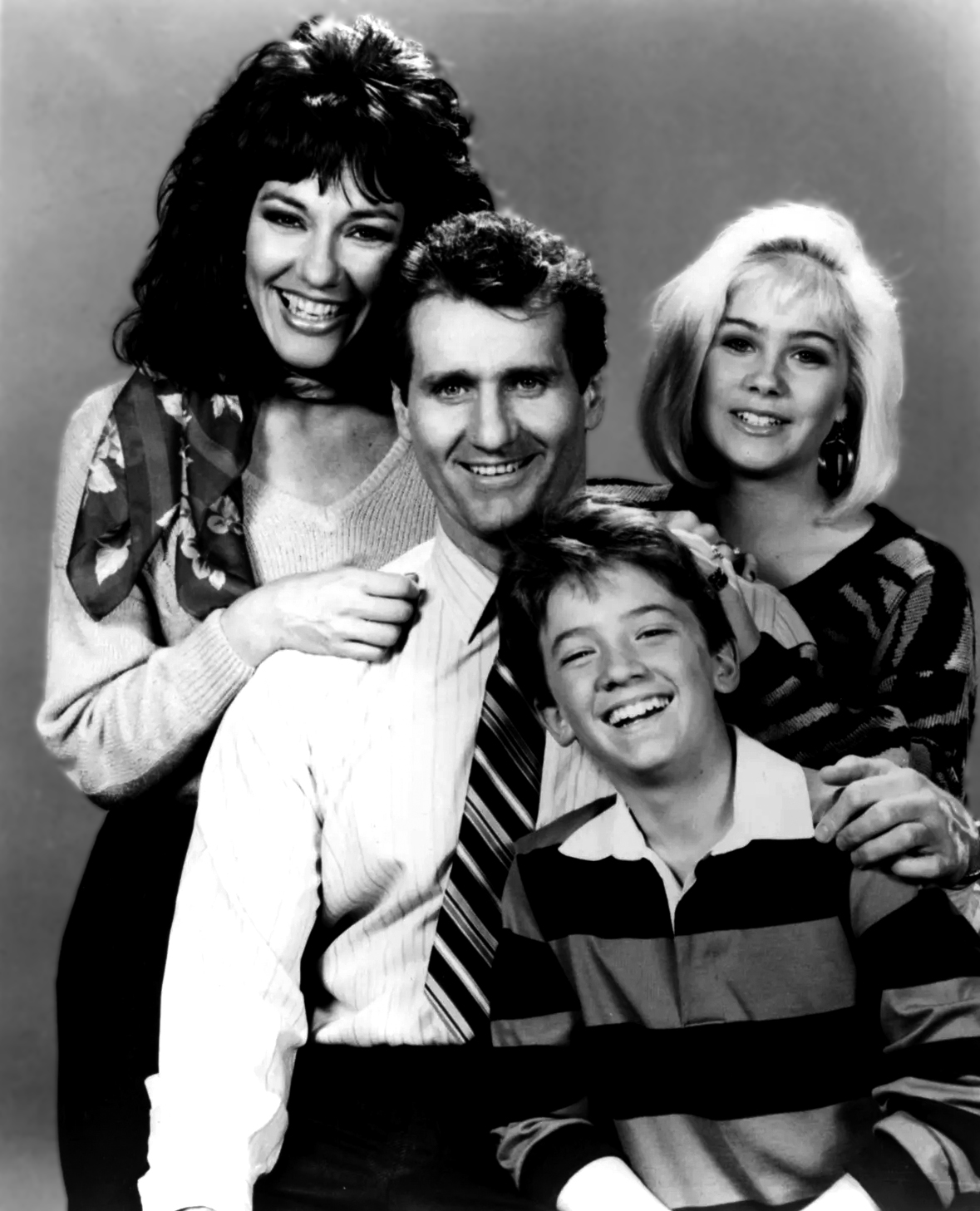
The cast of Married... with Children in 1987. From left to right: Katey Sagal, O'Neill, David Faustino and Christina Applegate.

In 1984, while playing the role of Lennie in a stage production of John Steinbeck's Of Mice and Men at Hartford Stage in Hartford, Connecticut, he was seen by a casting agent from the Fox television network and was asked to audition for the role of Al Bundy in Married... with Children, a proposed sitcom about a dysfunctional family living in Chicago. He earned the role because during the audition, he slumped his shoulders and sighed as he was about to walk through the front door of the home.

Married... with Children led off the first night of Fox's primetime lineup on April 5, 1987, concluding after 11 seasons on June 9, 1997. During this time, O'Neill starred in several films, including the family films Dutch (1991) and Little Giants (1994). He also had small parts in the comedy films Wayne's World (1992), and Wayne's World 2 (1993). He appeared as Relish the Troll King in The 10th Kingdom (2000). He took roles in the drama films Prefontaine (1997), The Spanish Prisoner (1997), and The Bone Collector (1999).

O'Neill made a brief appearance on the comedy variety show In Living Color, playing the "Dirty Dozens" champion who defeats the challenger, played by Jamie Foxx in 1994. He also made a cameo on the sitcom 8 Simple Rules as the ex-boyfriend of Cate S. Hennessy (played by Katey Sagal, who portrayed Al Bundy's wife Peggy on Married... with Children). O'Neill also appeared in the movie The Adventures of Ford Fairlane with Andrew Dice Clay. In the mid-1990s, he had a string of appearances in commercials for 1-800-COLLECT.

Law & Order franchise creator Dick Wolf cast O'Neill as Sergeant Joe Friday in his 2003 update of Jack Webb's long-running Dragnet media franchise. The series was canceled by ABC in its second season. O'Neill went on to appear as Pennsylvania Governor Eric Baker, a recurring character on the NBC political drama series The West Wing from 2004 to 2005. O'Neill also played Bill on HBO's television series John from Cincinnati. In 2008, O'Neill appeared in an advertisement for then-presidential candidate Barack Obama as "Al the Shoesalesman". In January 2009, O'Neill reunited with David Faustino (Bud Bundy from Married... with Children) for two episodes of Faustino's show Star-ving. O'Neill also appeared with the entire cast of Married... with Children again when they were honored at the 7th Annual TV Land Award show in 2009.

=== 2009–2020: Modern Family ===
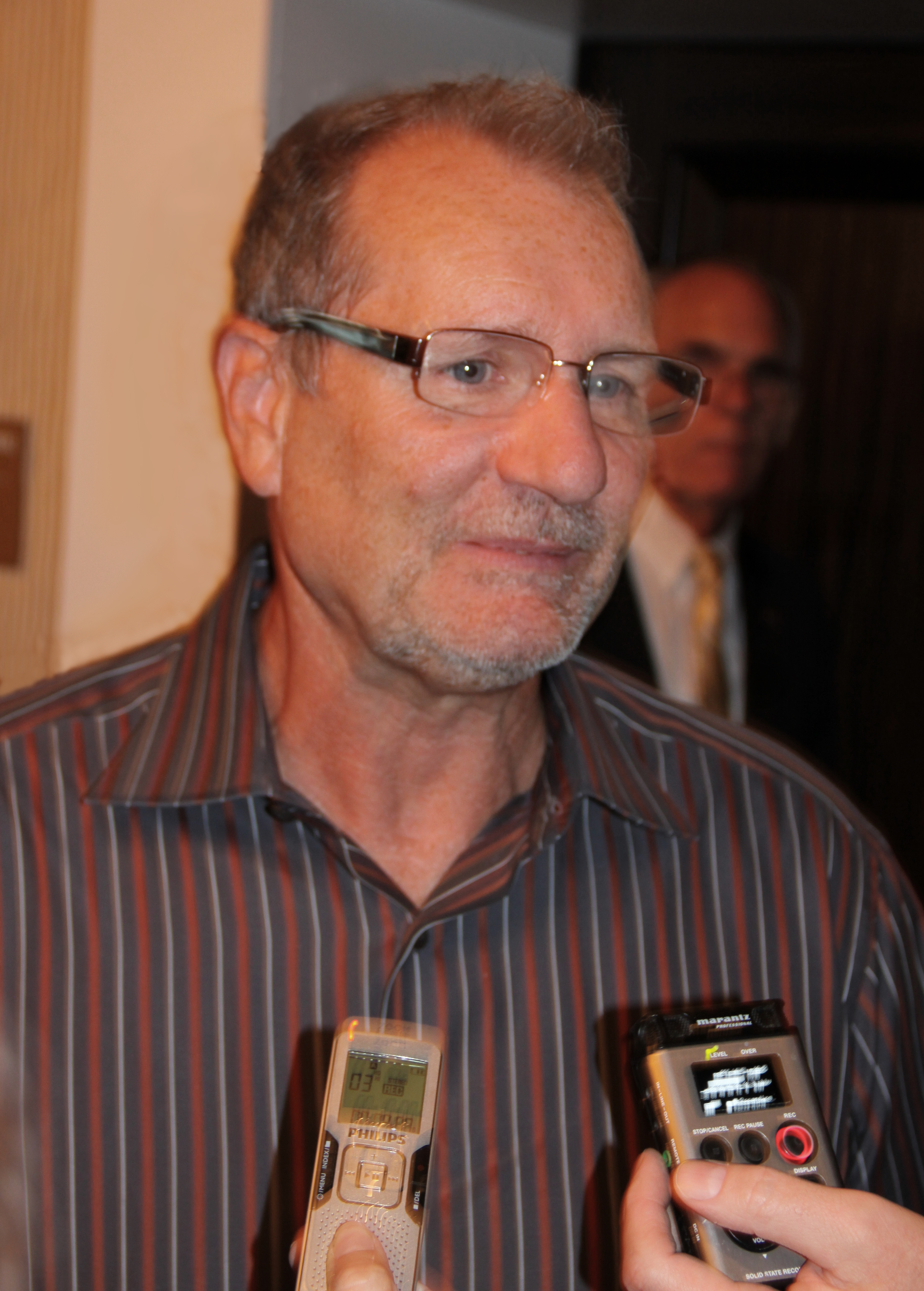
O'Neill in 2010

For eleven seasons O'Neill played the role of Jay Pritchett on the ABC sitcom Modern Family from 2009 to 2020. Ken Tucker of Entertainment Weekly wrote, "O'Neill may have the trickiest job here. A late-middle-ager remarried to a Latina bombshell... his Jay wants to enjoy his overdue-midlife-crisis prize but has to put up with her mope of a son... and do it without seeming like a mean old duffer. O'Neill and the writers pull it off by making Jay both deadpan sarcastic and a genuinely decent guy." Gina Bellafante of The New York Times wrote, "Mr. O'Neill exquisitely portrays the straight man to the fire engine of Sofia Vergara". Barry Garron of The Hollywood Reporter wrote, "O'Neill's Al Bundy is one of TV's most unforgettable characters, but this role will let viewers see him in a new light". The role earned him three Primetime Emmy Awards for Outstanding Supporting Actor in a Comedy Series nominations—in 2011, 2012, and 2013. O'Neill won the Screen Actors Guild Award for Outstanding Ensemble in a Comedy Series four times from 2010 through 2013.

Since 2012, O'Neill has done voice-overs in TV advertisements for the over-the-counter form of Zyrtec, along with Walmart's store-branded mobile phone service Straight Talk. In 2016, O'Neill starred as Hank the Octopus in the Pixar animated film Finding Dory. According to O'Neill, he didn't realize at first that he had a starring role in the film. As his voice recording sessions continued and most of his interactions turned out to be with Dory, he began to suspect that Hank was a major character in the film.

O'Neill starred in FX on Hulu miniseries Clipped portraying Donald Sterling. Andrew Lawrence of The Guardian gave the show a perfect score declaring, "Forty years of playing cranks on screen has given Ed O'Neill a particular understanding for Sterling’s quirks, gripes and foibles that few others in his field can claim". Daniel Feinberg of The Hollywood Reporter wrote, "O'Neill leans hard into every aspect of his entitled grotesquerie, from the external — such a bad dye job — to the dazed certainty in his intonations. It's not a subtle performance, but Donald Sterling's general grossness wasn't a secret". Quinci LeGardye of The A.V. Club stated, "O'Neill gives a skilled performance as a truly reprehensible human being".

== Personal life ==
O'Neill is married to actress Catherine Rusoff, with whom he has two children.

In 1991, O'Neill was introduced to Brazilian jiu-jitsu by his friend writer/director John Milius and has trained ever since under the mentoring of Rorion Gracie. In December 2007, after 16 years of training, O'Neill received his black belt. In the 2012 TV documentary I Am Bruce Lee, O'Neill states that he considers getting his black belt "the greatest achievement of my life, apart from my children."

On May 18, 2013, O'Neill was the recipient of an honorary Doctor of Arts degree from his alma mater, Youngstown State University. On November 30, 2023, after the controversial hiring of Republican congressman Bill Johnson as the university's president, O'Neill told Ideastream he was going to return his degree, saying: "I don't want it... I'm going to start calling it Trump-U."

== Acting credits ==
=== Film ===
Year	Title	Role	Notes
1980	Cruising	Detective Schreiber	
1980	The Dogs of War	Terry	
1989	Disorganized Crime	Detective George Denver	
1989	K-9	Sergeant Brannigan	
1990	The Adventures of Ford Fairlane	Lieutenant Amos	
1990	Sibling Rivalry	Wilbur Meany	
1991	Dutch	Dutch Dooley	
1992	Wayne's World	Glen	
1993	Wayne's World 2	Glen	
1994	Blue Chips	Ed Axelby	
1994	Little Giants	Kevin O'Shea	
1997	Prefontaine	Bill Dellinger	
1997	The Spanish Prisoner	FBI Team Leader	
1999	The Bone Collector	Detective Paulie Sellitto	
2000	Lucky Numbers	Dick Simmons	
2001	Nobody's Baby	Norman Pinkney	
2004	Spartan	Burch	
2005	Steel Valley	Congressman Cardone	Short film
2008	Redbelt	Hollywood Producer	
2010	Lost Masterpieces of Pornography	Chief Justice	Short film
2012	Wreck-It Ralph	Mr. Litwak	Voice role
2015	Entourage	Himself	Cameo
2016	Finding Dory	Hank the Octopus	Voice role
2016	Traficant: The Congressman of Crimetown	Himself	Documentary
2017	Sun Dogs	Bob Garrity	
2018	Ralph Breaks the Internet	Mr. Litwak	Voice role
2020	The Last Shift	Dale	
2026	Bad Day	TBA	Post-production

=== Television ===
Year	Title	Role	Notes
1980	The Day the Women Got Even	Ed	TV film
1981	Another World	Lenny	Episode: "Hostages at the Cabin"
1982	Farrell for the People	Detective Jay Brennan	TV film
1983	When Your Lover Leaves	Mack Sher	TV film
1984	Miami Vice	Arthur Lawson / Artie Rollins	Episode: "Heart of Darkness"
1985	Moonlighting	Taxi driver	Episode: "Pilot"
1985	Hunter	Dan Colson	Episode: "The Garbage Man"
1985	Braker	Danny Buckner	TV film
1985	The Equalizer	Doctor	Episode: "The Children's Song"
1985	Spenser: For Hire	Buddy Almeida	Episode: "Widow's Walk"
1986	A Winner Never Quits	Whitey Wyshner	TV film
1986	Popeye Doyle	James "Popeye" Doyle	TV pilot film
1987	Right to Die	Bob's Partner	TV film
1987–1997	Married... with Children	Al Bundy	Lead role; 259 episodes
1988	Police Story: Gladiator School	Sergeant Stanley Bivens	TV film
1988	Midnight Caller	Hank	Episode: "Twelve Gauge"
1990	Saturday Night Live	Guest host	Episode: "Ed O'Neill/Harry Connick, Jr."
1990	A Very Retail Christmas	Max Crandall	TV film
1990	The Earth Day Special	Al Bundy	TV special
1991	Top of the Heap	Al Bundy	Episode: "Top of the Heap"
1991	The Whereabouts of Jenny	Jimmy O'Meara	TV film
1994	In Living Color	Himself	Episode: "The Dirty Dozens Tournament of Champions"
1995	W.E.I.R.D. World	Dr. Monochian	TV film
2000	The 10th Kingdom	Relish the Troll King	9 episodes
2001	Big Apple	Detective Michael Mooney	8 episodes
2003–2004	Dragnet	Lieutenant Joe Friday	Main cast (renamed L.A. Dragnet, season 2)
2004	In the Game	Buzz	TV pilot
2004–2005	The West Wing	Governor Eric Baker	4 episodes
2005	8 Simple Rules	Matt Walsh	Episode: "Old Flame"
2006	Inseparable	Alan	TV film
2006	Twenty Good Years	Brock Manley	Episode: "Between Brock and a Hard Place"
2006	The Unit	William Partch	Episode: "Silver Star"
2007	John from Cincinnati	Bill Jacks	10 episodes
2009	WordGirl	Panicking Man (voice)	Episode: "The Wrong Side of the Law"; uncredited
2009–2020	Modern Family	Jay Pritchett	Lead role; 250 episodes
2011	Kick Buttowski: Suburban Daredevil	Grandpa (voice)	Episode: "Truth or Daredevil"
2011	Handy Manny	Mayor Thompson (voice)	Episode: "Great Garage Rescue"
2012	The Penguins of Madagascar	Orson (voice)	Episode: "Operation: Antarctica"
2013	Real Husbands of Hollywood	Himself	Episode: "Thicke and Tired"
2015	Family Guy	Bud Swanson (voice)	Episode: "Papa Has a Rollin' Son"
2019	Weird City	Burt Maxsome	Episode: "The One"
2020	A Modern Farewell	Himself	Modern Family documentary
2024	Finding Your Roots	Himself	Episode: "Buried Secrets"
2024	Clipped	Donald Sterling	Miniseries
2025	All's Fair	Doug Standish	Recurring cast

=== Video games ===
Year	Title	Role	Notes
2015	Disney Infinity 3.0	Hank the Octopus	Grouped under "Featuring the Voice Talents"

=== Theatre ===
Year	Title	Role(s)	Venue	Ref.
1979	Knockout	Paddy Klonski	Helen Hayes Theater, Broadway	
1982	Lakeboat	Pierman	Long Wharf Theater, Connecticut	
1984	Of Mice and Men	Lennie	Hartford Stage, Connecticut	
1984	A Streetcar Named Desire	Stanley Kowalski	Theatre Calgary, Canada	
1986	Androcles and the Lion	Ferrovius	Hartford Stage, Connecticut	
2008	Keep Your Pantheon	Strabo	Center Theatre Group, Los Angeles	

== Awards and nominations ==
O'Neill received a star on the Hollywood Walk of Fame on August 30, 2011, ironically located in front of a shoe store.

Year	Award	Category	Title	Result	Ref.
1991	Golden Globe Award	Best Actor in a Television Series – Comedy/Musical	Married... with Children	Nominated	
1992	Golden Globe Award	Best Actor in a Television Series – Comedy/Musical	Married... with Children	Nominated	
2011	Primetime Emmy Award	Outstanding Supporting Actor in a Comedy Series	Modern Family (episode: "The Kiss")	Nominated	
2012	Primetime Emmy Award	Outstanding Supporting Actor in a Comedy Series	Modern Family (episode: "Baby on Board")	Nominated	
2013	Primetime Emmy Award	Outstanding Supporting Actor in a Comedy Series	Modern Family (episode: "Bringing Up Baby")	Nominated	
2009	Screen Actors Guild Award	Outstanding Ensemble in a Comedy Series	Modern Family (season 1)	Nominated	
2010	Screen Actors Guild Award	Outstanding Actor in a Comedy Series	Modern Family (season 2)	Nominated	
2010	Screen Actors Guild Award	Outstanding Ensemble in a Comedy Series	Modern Family (season 2)	Won	
2011	Screen Actors Guild Award	Outstanding Ensemble in a Comedy Series	Modern Family (season 3)	Won	
2012	Screen Actors Guild Award	Outstanding Ensemble in a Comedy Series	Modern Family (season 4)	Won	
2013	Screen Actors Guild Award	Outstanding Ensemble in a Comedy Series	Modern Family (season 5)	Won	
2014	Screen Actors Guild Award	Outstanding Ensemble in a Comedy Series	Modern Family (season 6)	Nominated	
2015	Screen Actors Guild Award	Outstanding Ensemble in a Comedy Series	Modern Family (season 7)	Nominated	
2016	Screen Actors Guild Award	Outstanding Ensemble in a Comedy Series	Modern Family (season 8)	Nominated	
2011	Critics' Choice Television Award	Best Supporting Actor in a Comedy Series	Modern Family	Nominated	
2017	Critics' Choice Television Award	Best Supporting Actor in a Comedy Series	Modern Family	Nominated	
2011	Golden Nymph Award	Outstanding Actor in a Comedy Series	Modern Family	Nominated	
2009	TV Land Award	Innovator Award	Married... with Children	Won	

== Bibliography ==
Short stories
Year	Writing	Notes
2015	"A Few Cold Nights in '58"	Appeared in Car Bombs to Cookie Tables: The Youngstown Anthology

== See also ==
- List of Brazilian jiu-jitsu practitioners
