= Speed-the-Plow =

1988 play written by David Mamet

- Poster for the 1988 Broadway introduction of the play
- Original language: English
- Written by: David Mamet
- Characters: Bobby Gould; Charlie Fox; Karen
- Genre: Drama

Premiere
- Date: 1988
- Place: Royale Theatre, New York City
- Directed by: Gregory Mosher

Speed-the-Plow is a 1988 play by David Mamet that is a satirical dissection of the American movie business. As stated in The Producer's Perspective, "this is a theme Mamet would revisit in his later films Wag the Dog (1997) and State and Main (2000)". As quoted in The Producer's Perspective, Jack Kroll of Newsweek described Speed-the-Plow as "another tone poem by our nation's foremost master of the language of moral epilepsy."

The play sets its context with an epigraph (not to be recited in performance) by William Makepeace Thackeray, from his novel Pendennis, contained in a frontispiece: It starts: "Which is the most reasonable, and does his duty best: he who stands aloof from the struggle of life, calmly contemplating it, or he who descends to the ground, and takes his part in the contest?"

== Plot summary ==
=== Act I ===
The play begins in the office of Hollywood producer Bobby Gould. Gould's longtime associate, Charlie Fox, has arrived with important news: movie star Doug Brown is interested in making a movie Fox had sent his way some time ago. Gould tells Fox about a book he has been asked to give a "courtesy read" to, meaning that it is not seriously being considered to be made into a film. Gould's secretary, Karen, arrives with coffee and the two men chat with her about the movie business.

After Karen leaves, Fox teases Gould that he is attempting to seduce Karen. He thinks that Karen is neither a "floozy" nor an ambitious girl trying to sleep her way up the Hollywood ladder, so it would be hard for Gould to bed her. Gould thinks he can and the two make a five hundred dollar wager to that effect. Fox leaves, soon to be seeing Gould at their lunch appointment.

Karen returns to discuss the lunch reservation. Gould tells her about the book he has been giving a "courtesy read". He offers Karen a chance to take part in the process by reading the book and delivering to him her opinion of it to him that night at his home.

=== Act II ===
That night, at Gould's apartment, Karen delivers a glowing report on the book, saying she wants to work on the film adaptation. Gould says that even if the book is good, it won't make a successful Hollywood movie. Karen admonishes him for perpetuating the standard Hollywood formula instead of taking a creative risk. Karen says that she knows Gould invited her to his place in order to sleep with her and starts to seduce him into taking her to bed, and into pitching the book instead of the Doug Brown film.

=== Act III ===
The next morning Fox is back in Gould's office, excited about their upcoming meeting with Ross. Gould surprises Fox with news that instead he is going to be pitching the book, without him. Gould says that he feels the call to "do something which is right". Karen enters and eventually admits to being intimate with Gould the night before. Gould and Karen continue to stand together as a team until Fox gets her to admit that she would not have slept with Gould had he not agreed to green light a movie based on the book. With this, Karen's ambitious motives are revealed and Gould wins the bet. Fox throws her off the studio lot and prepares to pitch the Doug Brown film.

== Origin and meaning of the title ==
The Secret Middle Ages (ISBN 0-7509-2685-6) by Malcolm Jones discusses the origin of the phrase "God Speed the Plow" in a celebration known as Plow Monday and a 14th-century poem:

God spede the plow
And send us all corne enow
Our purpose for to mak
At crow of cok
Of the plwlete of Sygate
Be mery and glade
Wat Goodale this work mad

There is an 18th-century English play by Thomas Morton called Speed the Plough, which introduced the character of the prudish Mrs. Grundy.

In George Meredith's novel The Ordeal of Richard Feverel, the young protagonist, running away from home, encounters two peasants discussing their experiences, the Tinker and Speed-the-Plow. Describing them to a relative, he says, "Next, there's a tinker and a ploughman, who think that God is always fighting with the Devil which shall command the kingdoms of the earth. The tinker's for God, and the ploughman—"

In an interview in the Chicago Tribune, Mamet explained the title as follows:

I remembered the saying that you see on a lot of old plates and mugs: "Industry produces wealth, God speed the plow." This, I knew, was a play about work and about the end of the world, so "Speed-the-Plow" was perfect because not only did it mean work, it meant having to plow under and start over again.

== Productions ==
=== Broadway ===
Speed-the-Plow premiered on Broadway at the Royale Theatre in a production by the Lincoln Center Theater, opening on May 3, 1988, and closing on December 31, 1988, after 279 performances. The cast featured Joe Mantegna (Gould), Ron Silver (Fox) and Madonna (Karen). The casting of the pop star in her Broadway debut drew attention and made it a mega hit. The play was nominated for a Tony Award for Best Play and Best Direction of a Play (Gregory Mosher). Silver won a Tony Award for Best Actor (Play).

The first Broadway revival of Speed-the-Plow, directed by Atlantic Theatre Company artistic director Neil Pepe, began previews at the Ethel Barrymore Theatre on October 3, 2008, with an opening on October 23 in a limited engagement, closing on February 22, 2009. The cast featured Jeremy Piven as Bobby Gould, Raúl Esparza as Charlie Fox, and Elisabeth Moss as Karen. However, Piven left the production over medical issues on December 17. The role of Bobby was played by Norbert Leo Butz (from December 23 through January 11, 2009) and William H. Macy (from January 13 through February 22, 2009). Raul Esparza was nominated for the 2009 Tony Award for Best Performance by a Leading Actor in a Play. Reviews were positive.

=== Regional ===
It has been produced countless times in regional theaters and schools across the country.

The play was presented at the Remains Theater in 1987 starring William Peterson, the Geffen Playhouse, Los Angeles, in February and March 2007. Directed by Geffen artistic director Randall Arney, the cast starred Alicia Silverstone as Karen, Greg Germann as Charlie Fox and Jon Tenney as Bobby Gould.

=== London ===
- In 1989, it was produced at the National Theatre, directed by Gregory Mosher, with Colin Stinton, Alfred Molina and Rebecca Pidgeon.
- In 2000, the play was produced at the New Ambassadors Theatre with Mark Strong, Kimberly Williams and playwright Patrick Marber in his stage debut, and then transferred to the Duke of York's Theatre with a new cast of Nathaniel Parker (Bobby Gould), Neil Morrissey (Fox) and Gina Bellman (Karen) and a new director, Rupert Goold.
- In 2008, it was revived at the Old Vic Theatre, starring artistic director Kevin Spacey as Fox, Jeff Goldblum as Gould, and Laura Michelle Kelly as Karen.
- In September 2014, it was performed in the West End at the Playhouse Theatre, and was directed by Lindsay Posner, with Nigel Lindsay as Fox, Richard Schiff as Gould, and Lindsay Lohan as Karen. It received mixed reviews.

=== Sydney ===
- In 2016, a production was produced by the Sydney Theatre Company at the Roslyn Packer Theatre. It was directed by Andrew Upton and featured Damon Herriman as Bobby, Lachy Hulme as Charlie and Rose Byrne as Karen. It ran from November 8 to December 17, 2016.

=== Hong Kong ===
- In 2017, the production is produced by Dionysus Contemporary Theatre at the Hong Kong Academy for Performing Arts Lyric Theatre. It is directed by Olivia Yan, with the cast of Anthony Wong (Bobby Gould), Jan Lamb (Fox) and Rosa Maria Velasco (Karen), produced by Joyce Cheung. It will be the first time ever that the play has been translated into Chinese and performed in Cantonese.

=== Norway ===
- In 2002, Speed The Plow was produced by Det Norske Teatret, Norway's leading state-funded theatre in nynorsk. It is directed by Odd Christian Hagen, with the cast of Reidar Sørensen (Bobby Gould), Nina Woxholt (Fox) and Ingrid Jørgensen (Karen). It was the first time ever that the play was translated to this language. Mamet's brother attended the opening night, bringing his brother's greetings to the cast and crew. The music was composed and performed live by Ole Kristian Wetten.

== Reception ==
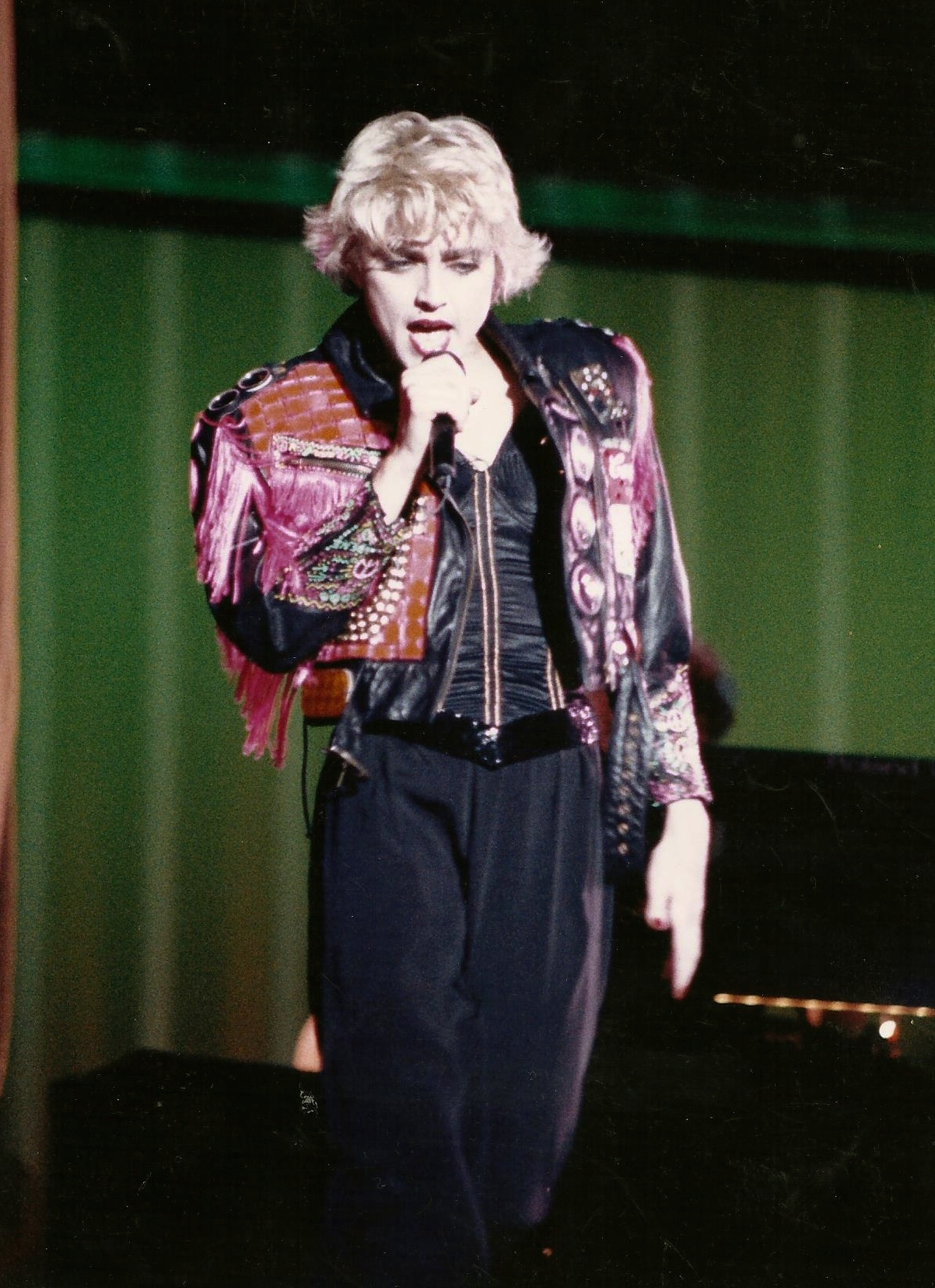
Madonna in 1987. Her appearance increased ticket sales, leading to the play being moved to a Broadway production.

The original play (1988) earned mostly positive reviews, while reviews for Madonna's acting ranged from mixed to positive. Theater critic Michael Kuchwara praised Mamet's play saying "absolutely on target, demolishing the egomaniacs who decide what reaches the silver screen". Commenting on Madonna's theatre debut, Ron Givens from Entertainment Weekly labeled it as a "very respectable Broadway debut", while Frank Rich from The New York Times complimented her "intelligent, scrupulously disciplined comic acting." In a negative review, UPI critic described "She is rigid, almost as though she is terrified to be on stage". Reviews centralized in Madonna also "left little space for considering the implications of the play itself".

=== Impact ===
The play debuted with a notable mass media attention, described by academic journal Modern Drama as a "rare phenomenon" for a straight play by an important American playwright, largely helped by Madonna's role. Due to her "highly publicized" stage role, every night after the show, a throng of Madonna fans would encircle the backstage exits of the theater. In Hollywood on Stage (2013), Kimball King speculates as to whether the audience is there to "see Madonna or engage with Mamet's play".

The casting of Madonna effected a sell out of Lincoln Theatre venue and a transfer to a large theatre in Broadway, elevating the entire production to a "new level". Although Winship commented "The production has a cheap look that is out of line with most Lincoln Center Theater productions". Madonna's appearance reportedly helped its box-office sales; the play sold a record number of advance tickets for six consecutive months, exceeding $1 million in ticket sales. After Madonna left the show's cast, ticket demand decreased drastically. In retrospect, Ron Silver claimed, he was thankful for all the hype that was generated by Madonna's appearance in the play. If it were not for Madonna's name, ticket sales might not have been great enough for the play to move to a Broadway theater, and he might never have a Tony award.

== Related works ==
Bobby Gould's story is continued in Mamet's one act play Bobby Gould in Hell.

In a review of Arthur Kopit's 1989 play Bone-the-Fish, New York Times theater critic Mel Gussow wrote that it "could be regarded as Mr. Kopit's response to David Mamet's Speed-the-Plow. In fact, the plays share much more than two hyphens. Mr. Kopit asks how far a film director will go in demeaning himself in quest of work."

Mamet's short story "The Bridge", which is the basis for the novel of the same name in the play, was published in the literary magazine Granta in 1985.

David Ives' one-act play Speed the Play, first produced in 1992 by the Chicago, Illinois-based Strawdog Theatre Company, is a parody of Speed-the-Plow.

== Film adaptation ==
Mamet directed a film adaptation of the play with production taking place from February 18 to March 13, 2026 in Atlanta. The film stars Anthony Mackie, Ben Mendelsohn, Emily Alyn Lind, and Sharon Stone.

== Awards and nominations ==
=== Original Broadway production ===
Year	Award	Category	Nominee	Result
1988	Drama Desk Awards	Outstanding Play	David Mamet	Nominated
1988	Drama Desk Awards	Outstanding Director of a Play	Gregory Mosher	Nominated
1988	Drama Desk Awards	Outstanding Actor in a Play	Ron Silver	Won
1988	Drama Desk Awards	Outstanding Actor in a Play	Joe Mantegna	Nominated
1988	Tony Awards	Best Play	David Mamet	Nominated
1988	Tony Awards	Best Direction of a Play	Gregory Mosher	Nominated
1988	Tony Awards	Best Actor in a Play	Ron Silver	Won

=== 2008 Broadway Revival ===
Year	Award	Category	Nominee	Result
2009	Drama Desk Awards	Outstanding Actor in a Play	Raúl Esparza	Nominated
2009	Tony Award	Best Actor in a Play	Raúl Esparza	Nominated
