= Lost Masterpieces of Pornography =

- Directed by: David Mamet
- Written by: David Mamet
- Produced by: Chrisann Verges; Mike Farah
- Starring: Kristen Bell; Ed O'Neill; Ricky Jay; Jack Wallace; Bob Jennings; Meg Librizzi
- Cinematography: Robert Elswit
- Edited by: Brad Schulz
- Production company: Funny or Die
- Release date: 2010
- Running time: 6 minutes
- Country: United States
- Language: English

Lost Masterpieces of Pornography is a 2010 American short film written and directed by David Mamet and starring Kristen Bell, Ed O'Neill and Ricky Jay. It was produced for Funny or Die.

== Cast ==
- Kristen Bell
- Ed O'Neill
- Ricky Jay
- Jack Wallace
- Bob Jennings
- Meg Librizzi
