= The Wicked Son =

2006 collection of essays

- Author: David Mamet
- Language: English
- Genre: Essay collection
- Publisher: Nextbook/Schocken
- Publication date: 2006
- Publication place: United States
- ISBN: 978-0805211573

The Wicked Son: Anti-Semitism, Jewish self-hatred, and the Jews is a collection of essays by playwright David Mamet, published by Nextbook/Schocken in 2006.

Mamet addresses the book "To the Jews…whose favorite Jew is Anne Frank…who bow the head reverently at a baptism and have never attended a bris – to you, who find your religion and race repulsive, your ignorance of your history a satisfaction, here is a book from your brother." Mamet confronts his readers: "The world hates Jews. ... The world hates you."

== Summary ==
In the Passover Seder, four different sons ask a question. The wicked son asks, "What does this ritual mean to you?", in essence separating himself from the group by sarcastically and scornfully declaring that the ritual has no personal meaning for him. In a series of related essays, Mamet uses this concept of the wicked son as a symbol of the atheistic or agnostic self-hating Jew in Western society.

=== Israel ===
Mamet gives his own personal, unapologetic explanation of Israel's situation. He declares that "The Jewish State has offered the Arab world peace since 1948; it has received war, and slaughter, and the rhetoric of annihilation." He notes that "It is a country, and like any country, will make mistakes." Yet as Mamet sees it, Israel is "not by proof, but by the mere process of indictment, excluded from the family of humankind."

Unlike more familiar defenses such as those by Alan Dershowitz in The Case for Israel, Mamet focuses on what he sees as the antisemitic psychology and underlying double standards of attacks on Israel. He sees the media portrayal of Israel as "a modern instance of the blood libel - that Jews delight in the blood of others." For example, he writes: "The everyday announcements of the so-called 'cycle of violence' in Israel are race slander, a pro-forma reminder of the availability of the Jews as an object of disgust." He sees antisemitism in "the inability to assign to Israelis a basic humanity…the happy assignment of wicked motives to the Israeli soldier." He underlines the double standard of antisemitism: "…'reprisals'…'retaliation'…the very words are revelatory, for such actions by the United States are known as 'defense'…"

=== Jewish identity ===
Mamet goes on to analyze what happens when Jews abandon loyalty to their religion and tradition in order, as he sees it, to find acceptance in a liberal society antagonistic to Israel. "It is the sin of the spies, a 'coward generation' with a 'lack of belief in God.' People have a drive to worship something, and will fill the void left by rejecting God by worshipping sports, celebrities, 'wealth, fame, status, sex, physical fitness, good works, human perfectibility." In the lavish bar mitzvah, Mamet sees the sin of the golden calf: "in the absence of God, lapsed Jews worship Man, power, gold. It is self-worship, the idolatry of human power."

"Our own enclave, the Jews, exists, in truth, in learning, containing wisdom, solace, tradition, and mutual support." "Secular Jews reject their birthright of 'connection to the Divine.'" "(Our religion) is a gift from God – what greater joy than to support it, to devote ourselves to it, and to enjoy it?"

== Reviews ==
- David Margolick, Maybe I Am Chopped Liver, (Review of The Wicked Son), New York Times, November 5, 2006.
- Abigail Radoszkowicz, Rites and wrongs, Jerusalem Post, November 16, 2006.
- Shaun Smith, The only good Jew is a very angry Jew, Toronto Star, April 1, 2007
- Tom Teicholz, Mamet's Question, The Jewish Journal, November 10, 2006
