= Lakeboat (film) =

- Directed by: Joe Mantegna
- Written by: David Mamet
- Produced by: Eric R. Epperson; Tony Mamet; Joe Mantegna; Morris Ruskin; Stacia Sekuler
- Starring: Charles Durning; Peter Falk; Robert Forster; J.J. Johnston; Denis Leary; Tony Mamet; Joe Mantegna; Jack Wallace; George Wendt
- Cinematography: Paul Sarossy
- Edited by: Christopher Cibelli
- Music by: Bob Mamet
- Distributed by: One Vibe Entertainment
- Release date: 2000
- Running time: 98 minutes
- Countries: Canada; United States
- Language: English

Lakeboat is a 2000 American drama film, adapted by David Mamet from his 1970 play of the same name, directed by Joe Mantegna and starring Charles Durning, Peter Falk, Denis Leary and Andy García.

== Plot ==
A young man, Dale Katzman, a college student from an Ivy League school "near Boston" takes a summer job as the night cook in the galley of the Seaway Queen, a lake boat bulk carrier on the Great Lakes for a Chicago-based steel concern. Dale's predecessor, Guigliani, endured a particularly violent end while on terra firma, the cause and nature of which is speculated by the other crew members. Dale gets to know each of them, including: Fireman, who reads voraciously when not "watching the gauges"; Fred, who imparts his unique, politically incorrect philosophy regarding women on the young man; and, especially, Joe Litko, a 23-year veteran of the seas, who sees much of himself in Dale.

== Cast ==
- Charles Durning as Skippy
- Peter Falk as The Pierman
- Robert Forster as Joe Litko
- J. J. Johnston as Stan
- Denis Leary as The Fireman
- Tony Mamet as Dale Katzman
- Joe Mantegna as Guy at Gate
- Jack Wallace as Fred
- George Wendt as First Mate Collins
- Andy Garcia as Guigliani
- Saul Rubinek as Cuthman

== Reception ==
The film has an 83% rating on Rotten Tomatoes. Roger Ebert awarded the film three stars.

== Box office ==
The film earned $5,159 on a limited release in the United States.
