= Olivia Yan =

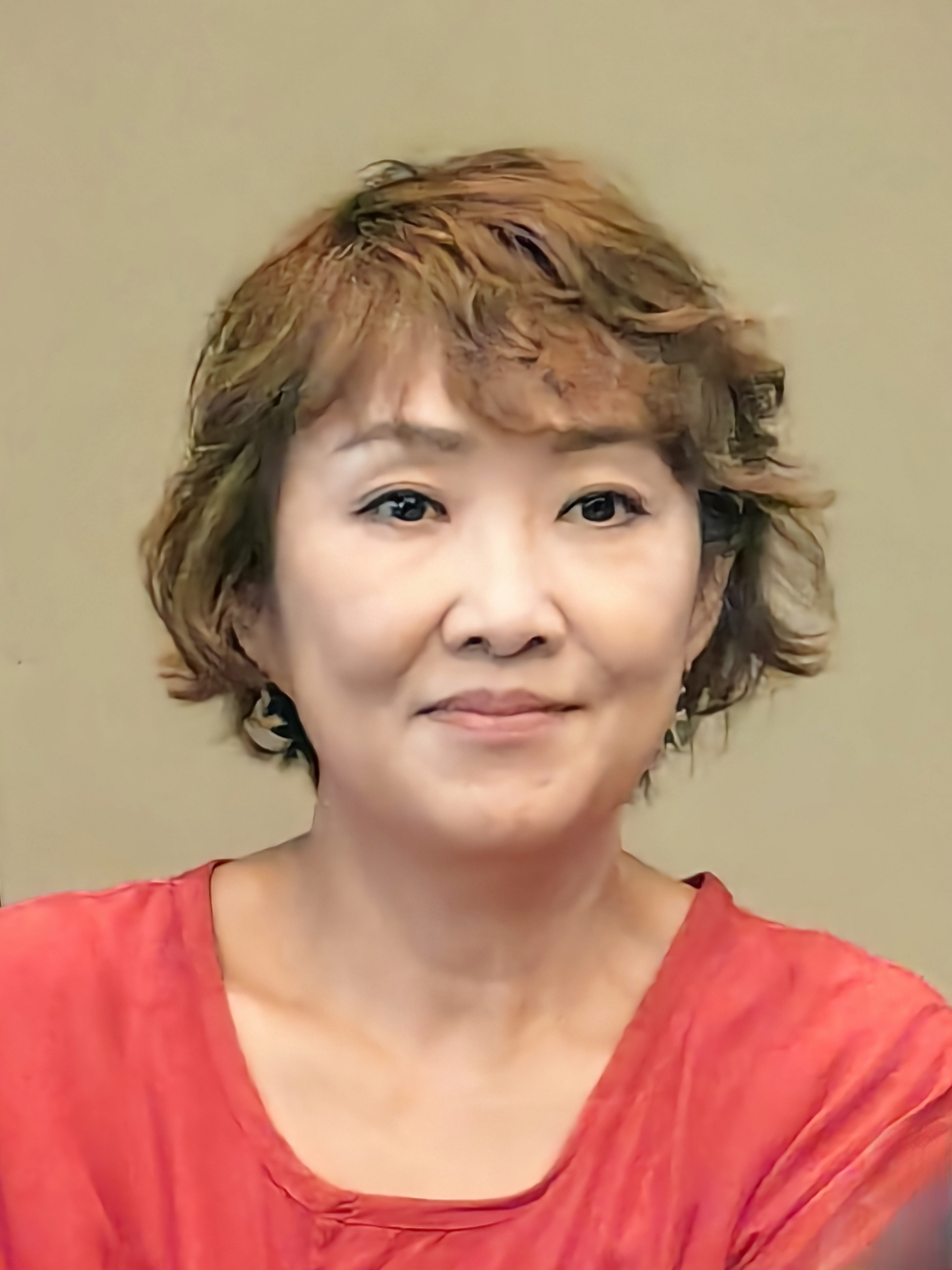
Olivia Yan at 2024 Hong Kong Book Fair

Olivia Yan (Chinese: 甄詠蓓; born 9 July 1968) is a Hong Kong theatre playwright, director, actress, teacher and writer. She has over 30 years of experience in artistic creation, teaching, and theater company operation, and has created more than 50 stage productions. She is frequently invited to perform, exchange ideas, and teach at overseas and local arts festivals, and her achievements are widely recognized.

Yan started attending Hong Kong Academy for Performing Arts in 1986. After graduating, she went to Britain and France to study acting, movement and postures under well known instructors Philippe Gaulier and Monika Pagneux. She co-founded Theatre Ensemble in 1993 and reorganised it into the PIP Cultural Industries Ltd. in 2008. She then founded the O Theatre Workshop in 2010 to be a distinctive brand for her works. in 2013, she partnered Anthony Wong and Joyce Cheung to found Dionysus Contemporary Theatre and is its Joint Artistic Director.

== Awards ==
The major awards that Yan has received include:

- 1993 – 2nd Hong Kong Drama Awards (HKDA) (1993) Best Supporting Actress (Comedy)
- 2000 – 9th HKDA (2000) Best Actress (Comedy)
- 2003 – Hong Kong Art Development Council (HKADC)'s Hong Kong Arts Development Awards – Young Artist Award (Drama)
- 2005 – 14th HKDA (2005) Best Actress (Comedy)
- 2014 – HKADC Hong Kong Arts Development Awards – Artist of the Year Award (Drama)

== Productions ==
- EQUUS (May 2014)
- Le Dieu Du Carnage (August 2015)
- Le Dieu Du Carnage (Re-run) (January 2016)
- Le Dieu Du Carnage (Huayi - Chinese Festival of Arts) (February 2016)
- A Midsummer Night's Dream (September 2016)
- A Midsummer Night's Dream (Huayi - Chinese Festival of Arts) (February 2017)
- Speed the Plow (September 2017)
