= Squirrels (play) =

Play written by David Mamet

Poster for the 2007 Santa Monica production

Squirrels is a one-act play by David Mamet.

The 1974 comedy is about Arthur, a middle-aged, egotistical hack writer who has been working on the opening line of a story involving a man's encounter with a squirrel for fifteen years, and Edmond, the young fledgling writer he has hired as a secretary/collaborator. They soon discover that Arthur's flamboyant redundancy clashes with Edmond's mediocre melodramatic style as they each develop increasingly ridiculous scenarios for the story. They are joined by Arthur's cleaning lady, also an aspiring writer, whose suggestions seem to be the most promising, but they too eventually bog down in banality.

In October 1974 Mamet directed the first production of the play at the St. Nicholas Theater Company in Chicago, Illinois. "Squirrels" was produced by the Philadelphia Festival Theatre for New Plays, in January 1990, at the Harold Prince Theatre, Annenberg Center. The director was William H. Macy, who had performed in the Chicago production.

The British premiere was presented by The Mandrake Theatre Company at the Kings Head Theatre, London in 1993. Directed by Aaron Mullen.

In more recent years it has been staged by the Philadelphia Fringe Festival, Upstairs at the Gatehouse in North London, and the Blue House Theatre Company and Criterion Theatre in Santa Monica.

The play was published in a paperback edition by Samuel French in 1982 (ISBN 0-573-62517-4).
