= Bobby Gould in Hell =

Bobby Gould in Hell is a play by the American playwright David Mamet. It premiered Off-Broadway in 1989 and also ran in London in 1991. The one-act play (45 minutes) updates the life of the character Bobby Gould, from Mamet's 1988 play Speed-the-Plow.

== Plot overview ==
The play shows Bobby Gould, introduced in Mamet's 1988 play Speed-the-Plow, and his time in Hell after he dies. Gould is subjected to questions from a devilish personage referred to simply as "The Interrogator." The Interrogator has had to interrupt a fishing trip in order to question Gould and he is consequently displeased. Through the course of the play, Gould confronts whether or not he is a "bad man."

== Productions ==
Bobby Gould in Hell premiered Off-Broadway at the Lincoln Center Mitzi E. Newhouse Theater on November 27, 1989, and closed on December 31, 1989, after 32 performances. Directed by Gregory Mosher, the cast starred Treat Williams as Bobby Gould, W. H. Macy as The Interrogator and Felicity Huffman as Glenna.

The British premiere was presented by The Mandrake Theatre Company in September 1991 at the Lyric Studio, Hammersmith, in London. Directed by Aaron Mullen, the cast featured Steven O'Shea as The Interrogator, Nic d'Avirro as Bobby Gould, and Nancy Crane.

In both productions, Bobby Gould was double-billed with Shel Silverstein's The Devil and Billy Markham under the title Oh, Hell.
