= The Duck Variations =

1972 play

The Duck Variations is a 1972 play by American playwright David Mamet. The play depicts a discussion taking place between two elderly men sitting on a park bench watching ducks. The dialogue begins with the mating habits of ducks and runs to examine law, friendship and death. The principal irony is that the men really know nothing about ducks. If they did, it would not improve their beautiful fugue on the theme of the possibility of happiness. Rather they use what experience has taught them and scattered, possibly incorrect ideas and facts to make guesses. They each assure the other that their guesses are established fact. By argument and occasional agreement a composite view of ducks and by extension, the world, begins to emerge.

== Synopsis ==
The play is focused around two old men who randomly meet on a park bench. Although it is usually played that the two men do not know of each other (the stage directions are ambiguous—they could meet, or they could be old friends), they awkwardly begin to talk to each other. As they fumble for topics to speak upon, somehow they always end up reverting to the ducks swimming around in the lake. Although their conversations seem misguided, as they talk about the ducks, many wise conversations are actually discussed. They talk about the leader of the ducks, and how every other duck follows that leader. When the leader duck dies, then a new leader must be chosen. They also talk about how everything the ducks do has a purpose. Within the dialog of the men, they talk about why things occur naturally, friendship, and death, not only in reference to the ducks, but also in human nature.

== Production history ==
The play was initially performed in 1972 at the Saint Nicholas Theatre, directed by Mamet.

The double bill of Sexual Perversity in Chicago and The Duck Variations was produced Off-Broadway at the Cherry Lane Theatre, from June 16, 1976 to April 17, 1977. The plays won the 1976 Obie Award, Best New American Play.

The play was presented at the Kirk Douglas Theatre, Los Angeles in 2008, as part of a program titled "Two Unrelated Plays by David Mamet," starring Harold Gould as Emil and Michael Lerner as George. According to theatre critic Charles McNulty, The Duck Variations, about seniors and death, is often paired with Sexual Perversity in Chicago, about young adults and sex.
