= The Shawl =

Four-act play by David Mamet

- Original language: English
- Written by: David Mamet
- Characters: John; Miss A; Charles
- Setting: John's office

Premiere
- Date: April 19, 1985
- Place: Briar Street Theater, Chicago

The Shawl is a four-act play by David Mamet. It premiered at the Goodman Theatre New Theatre Company in Chicago in 1985. The play concerns two men, John and Charles, who plan on defrauding Miss A out of her inheritance. The play scams and deceives to the very end, while emphasising the truth repeatedly.

== Background ==
According to Lindsay Crouse, " 'David told me once that he started to write 'The Shawl' in part because people said to him, 'You always write such wonderful characters but you don't write plot,'.... So he set out to exercise plot-writing as a craft. And I think it came out beautifully. Everybody gets fooled at least once in this play.' " The New York Times noted that "while The Shawl does not pretend at realism - Mr. Mamet has called it my 'Twilight Zone' episode - it must convince the audience that an educated, middle-class woman would put her faith into a mind reader. And the psychic himself is not some gypsy in paisley but a middle-aged man who is worried about losing his young, homosexual lover."

== Productions ==
The Shawl was initially presented by the Goodman Theatre's New Theatre Company in Chicago as the premiere production of their Briar Street Theatre. The play opened on April 19, 1985. Directed by Gregory Mosher, the cast featured Mike Nussbaum as John, Lindsay Crouse as Miss A and Gary Cole as Charles .

The Shawl was produced Off-Broadway at the Lincoln Center Mitzi E. Newhouse Theater, opening on December 23, 1985, and closing on February 2, 1986, after 48 performances. The play ran in a double bill with Mamet's Prairie du Chien. Directed by Mosher, the cast featured Mike Nussbaum as John, Lindsay Crouse as Miss A and Calvin Levels as Charles.

The Shawl's first London production was at the Royal Court Theatre Upstairs on June 9, 1986. The production was directed by Richard Eyre with David de Keyser as John, Connie Booth as Miss A and Michael Feast as Charles.

A BBC Television adaptation was broadcast as part of The Play on One on 14 March 1989. This production was directed by Bill Bryden and starred Nigel Hawthorne, Brenda Blethyn and Karl Johnson.

The Shawl was presented at the Arcola Theatre in London in September and October 2009. Directed by Amelia Nicholson, the cast featured Matthew Marsh, Elizabeth McGovern as Miss A. and Paul Rattray.

Presented at the Young Vic in London in December 2012.

== Plot ==
ACT 1 takes place in John's office and introduces us to John and Miss A. John is an amateur psychic and Miss A. is a woman whose mother recently died and left her an inheritance. Miss A. seeks psychic advice concerning matters both personal and financial regarding her mother's will. John also advises Miss A that she may have untapped psychic abilities.

ACT 2 introduces us to John's young protégé Charles, and alludes to the homosexual relationship between them. John explains to Charles the smoke-and-mirror tricks he uses on his customers, in particular Miss A, so that Charles may one day learn to make an "honest" living from this profession. Although John uses techniques of a questionable nature, he shows a more caring side towards his clients, whereas Charles is driven more by greed and ambition and is willing to compromise the ethics of the profession. They devise a plan to give Miss A what she wants: answers to her question about what to do with her inheritance. They plan to hold a seance and pretend to contact her deceased mother. In discussing the details of the plan, Charles pressures John into making it look like Miss A's mother will want to contest the will and give the inheritance to them.

ACT 3 takes place the following evening. The seance is held and John uses his usual smoke-and-mirror techniques in concert with his seance research. He pretends to contact a 19th-century Boston woman, who in turn allegedly contacts Miss A's mother. But Miss A puts the two charlatans to the test. She came prepared with a photograph of her mother, as she had been instructed by John the previous day. However, the photo is a fake. When tested, John claims the woman in the photo is that of Miss A's mother. Miss A then exposes them by declaring the photo a fraud. But just as she is about to storm out on them, John has a genuine psychic vision from Miss A's childhood regarding a Red Shawl. John is able to give a detailed description of The Shawl and how Miss A's mother would sing her to sleep as The Shawl, draped on her lamp, cast a red shadow.

ACT 4 takes place the following day. John is having a heated argument with Charles as he gets ready for his appointment with Miss A. John, having finally had the breakthrough psychic experience he wished for throughout his amateur years, is revealing to Charles the last of his tricks while telling him this is the parting of the ways. As Charles gives his farewell and leaves, Miss A shows up for their appointment. Upon being questioned by Miss A, John honestly admits to her that the Boston Woman was a fiction. However, Miss A is intrigued that John was able to have a genuine vision of her mother, because nobody could have made up the vision of The Shawl. Miss A offers John payment for helping her decide she should contest the will. And finally, when she asks John for clarification of how she lost The Shawl five years ago, John offers more genuine insight and elaborates that she burnt The Shawl in a fit of rage ... but that's all he saw.

=== Characters ===
- John - a man in his fifties
- Miss A - a woman in her late thirties
- Charles - a man in his thirties
