= Joyce Cheung =

Hong Kong theatre producer

Joyce Cheung is a Hong Kong theatre producer. She graduated with an advanced diploma from the School of Drama at the Hong Kong Academy for Performing arts; a Bachelor of Arts (1st class honours) in directing from the School of Drama; and a Master of Arts in comparative and public history from the Department of History at the Chinese University of Hong Kong. She has been actively involved in the radio, film, theatre and publishing industries, working both on- and off-stage in theatre production, distribution and promotion as a producer, book editor and writer.

Cheung was the Chief Executive of the Hong Kong Film Awards Association (1993-2000). She has been involved in planning and producing many theatre projects, include "Legend of the Mad Phoenix", *Shanghai Blues* and "Enigma Variations". More recently, she was the producer of "EQUUS, God of Carnage" (premiere and re-run) and "A Midsummer Night's Dream", and executive producer of "Tonnochy".

Cheung founded the renamed SCHOOLMATES.CC in 2003 as a publisher of performing arts-related books and cultural events planner. She is currently its production director and chief editor. In 2013, she co-founded Dionysus Contemporary Theatre with Anthony Wong and Olivia Yan, and is its administration director. Besides supervising the theatre's productions, she has conducted two terms of courses for theatre producers.

Cheung was the Chairman of the HKAPA alumni association (2014-2016) and was selected as a drama-arts advisor by the Hong Kong Arts Development Council.

== Productions ==
- EQUUS (May 2014)
- Tonnochy (2014-2015)
- Le Dieu Du Carnage (August 2015)
- Le Dieu Du Carnage (Re-run) (January 2016)
- Le Dieu Du Carnage (Huayi - Chinese Festival of Arts) (February 2016)
- A Midsummer Night's Dream (September 2016)
- A Midsummer Night's Dream (Huayi - Chinese Festival of Arts) (February 2017)
- Speed the Plow (September 2017)
