= Three Uses of the Knife =

1998 book by David Mamet

- Author: David Mamet
- Series: The Columbia Lectures on American Culture
- Subject: Drama
- Publisher: Columbia University Press
- Publication date: February 1998
- Publication place: United States
- Pages: 96 (first edition, clothbound)
- ISBN: 0-231-11088-X
- OCLC: 37115843
- Dewey Decimal: 808.2 21
- LC Class: PN1631 .M26 1998

Three Uses of the Knife: On the Nature and Purpose of Drama is a book by David Mamet that discusses playwriting. In it, Mamet discusses the conscious and unconscious processes that go on in developing a work of art.

The essay, dedicated to Michael Feingold (a critic of The Village Voice), is divided in three chapters: "The Wind-Chill Factor", "Second Act Problems", and "Three Uses of the Knife".

Mamet begins his book by saying that people naturally dramatize everyday occurrences and that life itself is inherently theatrical: "Our survival mechanism orders the world into cause-effect-conclusion." He goes on to explain that the ways in which we dramatize our everyday experiences are not different than 'true drama', particularly tragedy, which—along with myth and religion—creates awe within the audience. True drama enables the spectator to achieve peace by realizing the fact that he or she is powerless to affect the natural order.

The book's title stems from a quote from musician Lead Belly, appearing on page 66:

- Huddie Ledbetter, also known as Leadbelly, said: You take a knife, you use it to cut the bread, so you'll have strength to work; you use it to shave, so you'll look nice for your lover; on discovering her with another, you use it to cut out her lying heart.

Another more significant quote from the book: "The subject of drama is The Lie. At the end of the drama THE TRUTH -- which has been overlooked, disregarded, scorned, and denied -- prevails. And that is how we know the Drama is done."
