= Jack Wallace (actor) =

American actor (1933–2020)

- Born: August 10, 1933; Pekin, Illinois, U.S.
- Died: April 16, 2020 (aged 86); Los Angeles, California, U.S.
- Occupation: Actor
- Years active: 1969–2020
- Spouse: Margot Wallace (until his death)
- Children: 2

Jack Wallace (August 10, 1933 – April 16, 2020) was an American actor who is known for his roles in movies including Death Wish (1974), Tune in Tomorrow (1990), Boogie Nights (1997), American Pie 2 (2001), and Love for Rent (2005).

== Early life and education ==
Wallace was born on August 10, 1933, in Pekin, Illinois. He attended Wells High School in Chicago and served three years in jail for armed robbery. Wallace worked several blue collar jobs such as window washing before becoming an actor, which he was also passionate about.

== Career ==
In 1969, Wallace began his acting career in Chicago. He played a detective in the film Death Wish.

Wallace was a co-recipient of the 1984 Drama Desk Award for Outstanding Ensemble, which he shared with the rest of the cast members in the Broadway production of David Mamet's Glengarry Glen Ross. He had also appeared in such films as Death Wish (1974), House of Games (1987), Above the Law (1988) and Boogie Nights (1997) as well as television programs such as Law & Order, Six Feet Under and NYPD Blue.

== Personal life ==
Wallace was married at least twice. At an early age, Wallace married and fathered two children. He later married his wife Margot, whom he met on the set of the film Lakeboat. They were married until his death in 2020.

== Death ==
Wallace died of cancer in the late night of April 16, 2020, at his home in Los Angeles, California.

== Selected filmography ==
- Death Wish (1974) as Detective Hank
- The Last Affair (1976)
- Medusa Challenger (1977) as Uncle Jack
- The Big Score (1983) as Policeman #1
- House of Games (1987) as Bartender / House of Games
- Above the Law (1988) as Uncle Branca
- Things Change (1988) as Repair Shop Owner
- The Bear (1988) as Bill
- State of Grace (1990) as Matty's Bartender
- Tune in Tomorrow (1990) as Policeman
- Fatal Encounter (1990)
- Homicide (1991) as Frank
- Liebestraum (1991) as Mike
- Mad Dog and Glory (1993) as Tommy the Bartender
- Minotaur (1994) as Father
- Frasier (1994, TV Series) as Joe
- Steal Big Steal Little (1995) as Nick's Boy
- Nixon (1995) as Football Coach
- The Killing Jar (1997) as Dick Resigy
- Levitation (1997) as The Bartender
- Amnesia (1997) as Sheriff
- Cold Around the Heart (1997) as Police Captain Man
- The Spanish Prisoner (1997) as Sanitation Man
- Boogie Nights (1997) as Rocky
- Sparkler (1997) as Jesse
- Anarchy TV (1998) as Mr. Harris
- Twilight (1998) as Interrogation Officer
- Brown's Requiem (1998) as Bud Myers
- Stranger in My House (1999) as Chief Lewis
- Lakeboat (2000) as Fred
- NYPD Blue 7x10 (2000) as Detective Hoffman
- Jacks or Better (2000) as Jack
- State and Main (2000) as Bellhop
- American Pie 2 (2001) as Enthusiastic Guy
- According to Spencer (2001) as Waiter
- Beyond the City Limits (2001) as Detective McMahon
- Duty Dating (2002) as Mr. Penn
- Fairie (2002) as Finvara
- The Employee of the Month (2002) as Harry
- Love for Rent (2005) as Uncle Todd
- Edmond (2005) as Chaplain
- Journeyman (2005) as Dreamer
- Redbelt (2008) as Bar Patron
- Faster (2010) as Joe, Bathroom Attendant
- An Old Man's Gold (2012) as Charlie Dawson
- Coffee, Kill Boss (2013) as Jim T. Pruit
- Welcome to Me (2014) as Bud Klieg
- The Boy Next Door (2015) as Mr. Sandborn
- Band of Robbers (2015) as 'Doc' Robinson
- Nocturnal Animals (2016) as Old Man (uncredited)
- Extortion (2017) as Lucas
- Spivak (2018) as Bartender
- Senior Moment (2021) as Ted Garvin
