= Atlantic Theater Company =

Off-Broadway non-profit theater company

- Official company logo

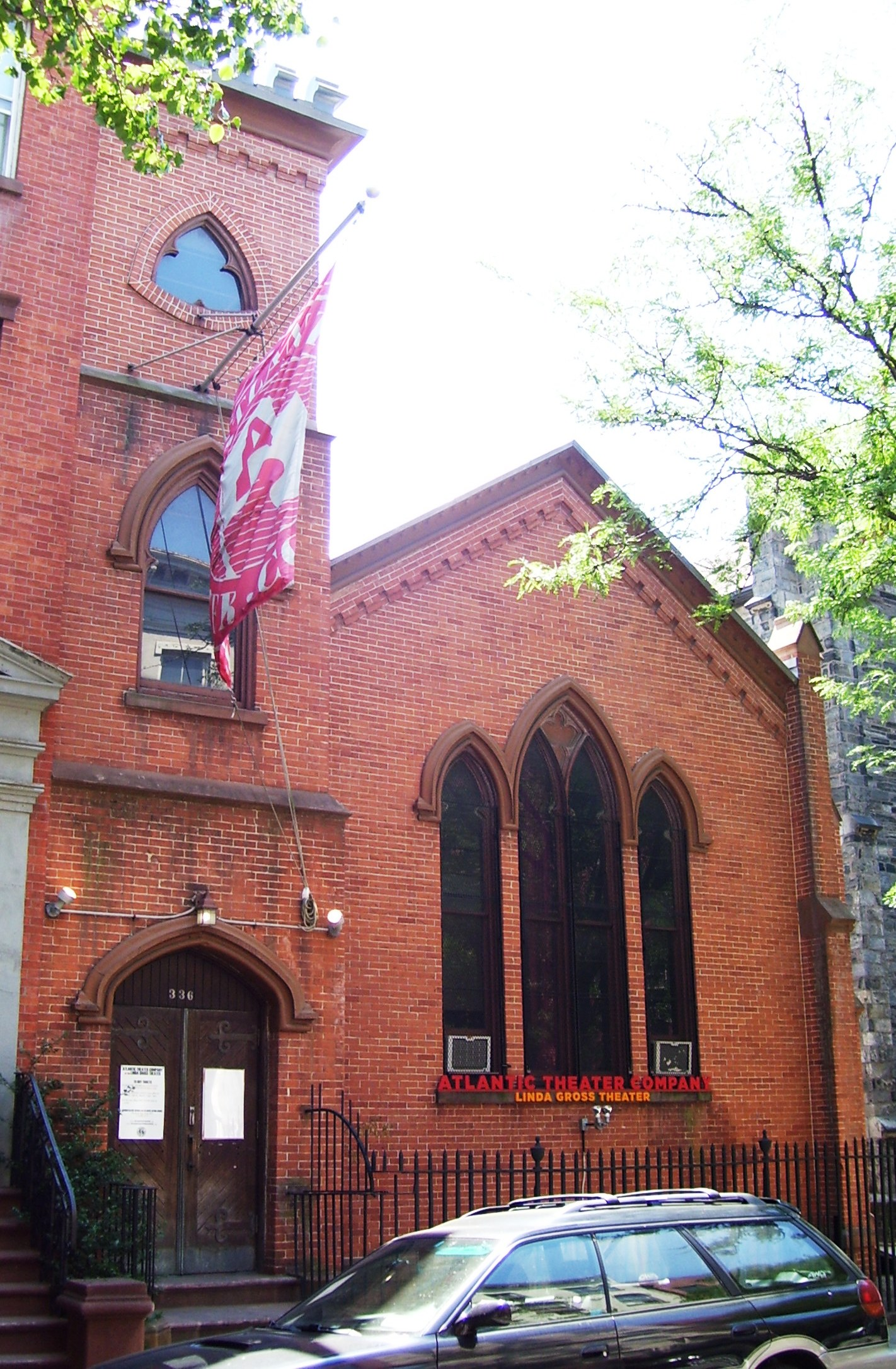
- Interactive map of Atlantic Theater Company
- Address: 336 West 20th Street; Manhattan, New York City; United States
- Coordinates: 40.743912°N 74.001819°W
- Capacity: 199 – Linda Gross Theater; 99 – Stage 2
- Type: Off-Broadway

Construction
- Opened: 1985

Website
- atlantictheater.org

The Atlantic Theater Company is an Off-Broadway non-profit theater company based in the Chelsea neighborhood of Manhattan, New York City. Founded in 1985 by playwright David Mamet, actor William H. Macy, and a group of acting students, the company is dedicated to producing innovative works by emerging and established playwrights. Atlantic emphasizes a distinctive acting technique known as Practical Aesthetics and operates both a professional theater and an affiliated acting school. There is the 199-seat mainstage Linda Gross Theater, which is located at 336 West 20th Street between Eighth and Ninth Avenues, in the parish hall of St. Peter's Episcopal Church, built in 1854 and renovated in 2012. Additionally, the 99-seat black-box theater, Stage 2, is located at 330 West 16th Street, also between Eighth and Ninth Avenues, in the former Port Authority building. Stage 2, which opened in June 2006, is the home of Atlantic’s development program for new plays, which encompasses the commissioning of new works, readings, workshops, and fully staged productions.

== Productions ==
Since its inception, Atlantic has produced more than 200 plays, including the Tony Award winning productions of Spring Awakening, The Band's Visit, Kimberly Akimbo, and Buena Vista Social Club, David Mamet’s adaptation of The Voysey Inheritance by Harley Granville Barker, Mamet’s Romance, Joe Penhall’s Blue/Orange, Dublin Carol by Conor McPherson, Woody Allen’s Writer’s Block, the revival of Hobson's Choice, the revivals of Mamet's American Buffalo, The Woods, and Edmond, Dangerous Corner by J. B. Priestley, The Cider House Rules, adapted by Peter Parnell, Celebration, The Room and The Hothouse by Harold Pinter, Mojo by Jez Butterworth, the New York premieres of Howard Korder’s Boys’ Life and The Lights at Lincoln Center Theater, Kevin Heelan’s Distant Fires, Quincy Long’s The Joy of Going Somewhere Definite and Shaker Heights, Tom Donaghy’s Minutes From The Blue Route, Edwin Sánchez’ Trafficking in Broken Hearts, and Missing Persons by Craig Lucas.

Atlantic has also had a notable collaboration with the Irish playwright Martin McDonagh, having premiered four of his plays in New York: Hangmen (2018), The Cripple of Inishmaan (2008), The Lieutenant of Inishmore (2006) and The Beauty Queen of Leenane (1998). The latter two transferred to Broadway.

=== Critical reception ===
Atlantic Theater Company has produced more than 200 plays and musicals, premiering both new works and revivals. Shows such as Spring Awakening (2006) and The Band's Visit (2016) originated at the Atlantic before transferring to Broadway, where they won multiple Tony Awards. Notable productions include:

- Spring Awakening (2006), which went on to win eight Tony Awards.
- The Band’s Visit (2016), which won 10 Tony Awards following its Broadway transfer.
- The Beauty Queen of Leenane by Martin McDonagh (1998), which garnered significant critical acclaim.

Atlantic often develops new plays through workshops before full production.

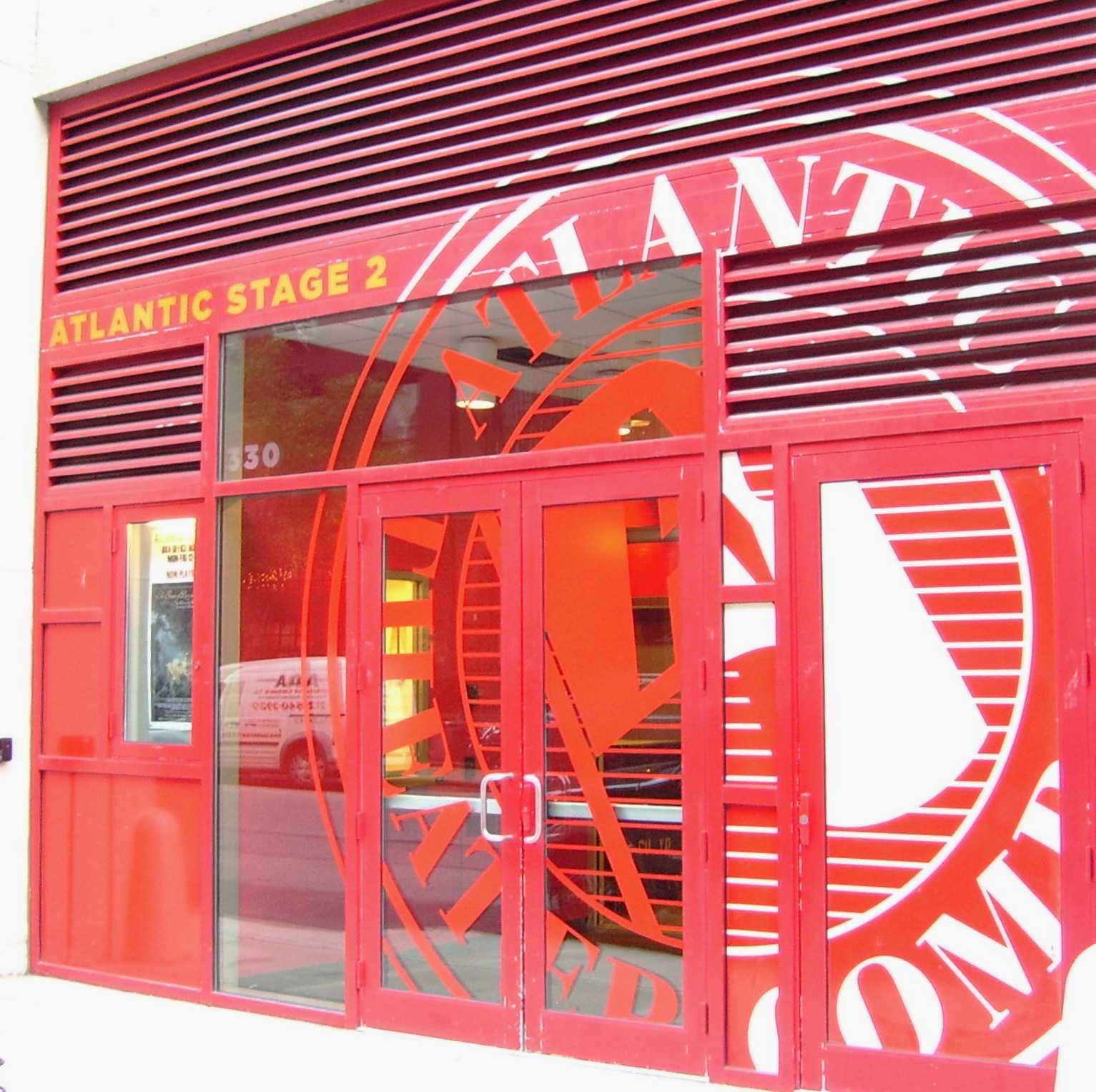
The entrance to Stage 2, at 330 West 16th Street

Other Mamet productions by Atlantic include his adaptation of Chekhov's Three Sisters, and his own plays The Blue Hour, Yes, But So What?, Revenge of the Space Pandas, The Poet and the Rent, Vermont Sketches, Reunion, Sexual Perversity in Chicago, The Duck Variations, The Water Engine, Home, School, and Keep Your Pantheon. In February 2017, Mamet's play The Penitent started its previews leading to its premiere at the end of February.

In other recent productions, Atlantic has produced On the Shore of the Wide World by Simon Stephens, Describe the Night by Rajiv Joseph, The Homecoming Queen by Ngozi Anyanwu, The Great Leap by Lauren Yee, and This Ain't No Disco with music and lyrics by Stephen Trask and Peter Yanowitz.

== Acting school ==
The Atlantic Acting School offers a two year conservatory program and a New York University undergraduate program. The school focuses on the Practical Aesthetics, a philosophy and acting technique that grew out of a series of NYU summer workshops in Vermont in 1983 and 1984 with playwright David Mamet and actor William H. Macy.

A number of theater companies have been formed by former students of Atlantic Acting School, including Pipeline Theatre Company, Bluebird Theatre Company, The Joust Theatre Company, Harvard Sailing Team, Crashbox Theatre Company, Cake Productions, 3rd Kulture Kids, Acorn Pictures, Aggrocrag, Lesser America, Foolish Gentlemen Films, and The Plinth.

=== Notable alumni ===
Several prominent actors and theater artists have trained or worked with the Atlantic Theater Company. Notable alumni include:

- Felicity Huffman (Academy Award-nominated actress)
- Clark Gregg (actor and director, The Avengers series)
- Rose Byrne (Academy Award, Emmy and Golden Globe-nominated actress)
- Jason Ritter (Emmy-nominated actor)
- Gillian Jacobs (star of Community and Love)
- Stephanie Hsu (Academy Award-nominated actress)
- Anna Chlumsky (Emmy Award-nominated actress)
- Elizabeth Olsen (Emmy and Golden Globe-nominated actress, The Avengers series)
- Gina Rodriguez (Golden Globe winning actress)
- John Early (comedian and actor)

== 2025 labor dispute ==
The stagehands of the Atlantic went on strike on January 12, 2025 with IATSE and Actor's Equity Association's support. IATSE contends that the company failed to negotiate in good faith after employees vote to join the union in February 2024, employing stalling techniques. The dispute was settled on March 25, 2025.

== See also ==
- Culture of New York City
- List of Manhattan neighborhoods
