= The Frog Prince (play) =

- Written by: David Mamet

The Frog Prince is a play by American author, essayist, playwright, screenwriter and film director David Mamet. The play is about half an hour long and tells the traditional story of the haughty prince who has been placed under a spell which has turned him into a frog and can only be restored to his original form by a willing kiss. The play is more cheerful than most of Mamet's work and contains none of the coarse language for which he is known.

The Frog Prince was first presented in 1982 in Chicago at Goodman Theatre by the Remains Theatre Ensemble. It was performed in 1985 in New York at the Ensemble Theatre Studio.

After a number of performances in 1997 at the 78th Street Theater Lab in Manhattan under the direction of Eric Nightengale, the play was revived in 1999 with some cast changes, including Toby Wherry, and the addition of four songs.

In 1998 the play was performed in Los Angeles by Broken Leg Productions at the Hudson Theater.
