= The Penitent (play) =

2017 play by David Mamet

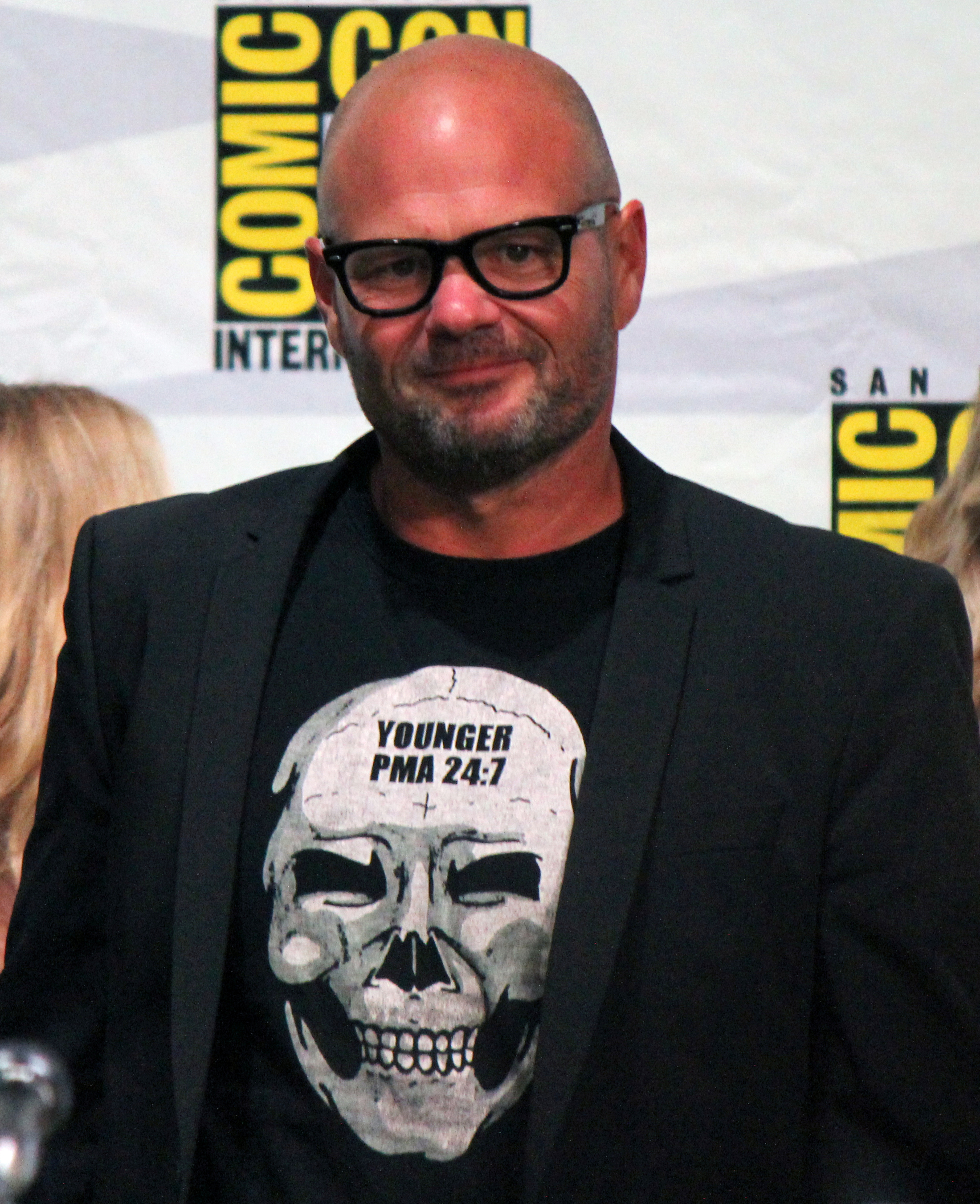
- Chris Bauer plays the lead in The Penitent
- Original language: English
- Written by: David Mamet
- Genre: Drama

Premiere
- Date: 2017
- Place: Atlantic Theater Company, New York City, New York
- Directed by: Neil Pepe

The Penitent is a play by David Mamet that previewed off-Broadway starting on February 8, 2017, for its premiere in late February. The play deals with issues of threats to professional career advancement and the LGBT community. The play was directed by artistic director Neil Pepe of the Atlantic Theater Company.

== Plot ==
A psychiatrist, Charles (Chris Bauer), has his career and life become derailed after he refuses to testify on behalf of a former patient who had become clinically violent and unstable, resulting in the deaths of multiple people following a tragic breakdown of his mental complications. The patient then claims that Charles will not testify in court or to the police because the patient is openly part of the LGBT community. Further, the patient claims that Charles has recently gone through a religious conversion in his own personal identity which has resulted in a fully prejudiced reassessment of the gay community as a whole. Charles claims that the basis of these accusations are false and due to a misunderstanding. The misunderstanding resulted from an innocent mistyping of the title of an article that Charles wrote years ago about homosexuality where the title was "Homosexuality as an Adaptation," though the published version was released by the editor as the mistyped "Homosexuality as an Aberration." The resulting recriminations put Charles's entire career at risk and threaten to end his practice permanently.

== Cast and characters ==
- Chris Bauer plays an experienced and published psychiatrist
- Jordan Lage plays his attorney
- Lawrence Gilliard Jr plays a supporting role
- Rebecca Pidgeon plays a supporting role

== Production ==
The Penitent opened for its first previews off-Broadway on February 8, 2017, with its premiere planned to take place at the end of February at the Atlantic Theater Company in downtown New York. The play follows Mamet's previous play titled China Doll which, though making a profit for its producers, closed on Broadway in early 2016 without fanfare. The Penitent was directed by artistic director Neil Pepe at the Atlantic Theater Company.

February 27, 2017, marked the opening of the play in its limited run scheduled to end on March 19, 2017, at the Linda Gross Theater in New York.

== Critical reception ==
The play, while in previews for most of February 2017, received no reviews leading to its opening at the end of February. Upon its premiere, The New York Times's Alexis Soloski gave the play a mostly negative review, arguing that it lacked the style and intensity of Mamet's earlier work. Deeming the play "cynical and morose", Soloski was especially disappointed in Chris Bauer's performance, stating that "his downbeat take on the role is like a damp towel thrown across the stage".
