= On Directing Film =

1991 non-fiction book by David Mamet

- Author: David Mamet
- Language: English
- Subject: Cinema
- Publisher: Penguin Books
- Publication date: 1991
- Publication place: United States
- ISBN: 0-670-83033-X
- OCLC: 22178971
- Dewey Decimal: 791.43/0233 20
- LC Class: PN1995.9.P7 M28 1991

On Directing Film is a 1991 non-fiction book by American playwright and filmmaker David Mamet.

The book is made up of six chapters, of which the second and fifth take the form of dialogue between Mamet and unnamed students, reflecting that the book was based on classes in film directing held by Mamet at Columbia University's film school. Mamet takes a strong oppositional view to mainstream American filmmaking, method acting, and general indulgence in art. He cites as his major influence Sergei Eisenstein and his montage theory, and makes numerous references to the work of Russian theatre director and theorist Stanislavsky.
