= Lakeboat =

1980 semi-autobiographical play by David Mamet

- Written by: David Mamet
- Original language: English

Premiere
- Date premiered: 1980
- Place premiered: Milwaukee Repertory Theater

Lakeboat is a semi-autobiographical play by David Mamet, written in 1970 and first produced in 1980 (revised version, with the help of John Dillion of the Milwaukee Repertory Theater).

== Plot ==
As he would later do with Glengarry Glen Ross, Mamet drew upon experiences from a past vocation to create high drama. In this case, he turned to his days as a cook aboard a cargo ship to frame this tale of Dale Katzman, a college student from an Ivy League school "near Boston" who takes a summer job as a cook in the galley of the T. Harrison, a lake freighter for a Chicago-based steel concern. Dale's predecessor, Guigliani, endured a particularly violent end while on terra firma, the cause and nature of which is speculated by the other crew members. Dale, and the audience, gets to know each of them, including: Fireman, who reads voraciously when not "watching the gauges"; Fred, who imparts his unique, politically incorrect philosophy regarding women on the young man; and, especially, Joe Litko, a 23-year veteran of the seas, who sees much of himself in Dale.

== Premiere ==
The play's world premiere was staged by the Milwaukee Repertory Theater on April 24, 1980; subsequent major productions were mounted by the Long Wharf Theatre and the Goodman Theatre in 1982. In 2000, Mamet penned the screenplay for a film adaptation, which featured his half-brother Tony Mamet in the lead role of Dale. The ensemble cast also included Robert Forster as Joe Litko, Denis Leary as Fireman, and Jack Wallace, a veteran of Mamet productions, as Fred. Joe Mantegna, well-versed in the world of Mamet, made his directorial debut with the feature.

The British Premiere of Lakeboat was at the Lyric Theatre, London in 1998, and was directed by Aaron Mullen.

== Publication ==
The play was published in two versions: one by Grove Press, and another with slight revisions by Samuel French.

== See also ==
- Lakeboat (film)
