= False or True =

Children's TV programme, 1993–1996

False or True (also known as FoT) is a children's TV programme broadcast from 1993 to 1996 in the UK on CBBC. Some years later it returned as a completely revised show as part of the Saturday morning show Live & Kicking from 2000 to 2001. Its premise was a series of videos in the style of news reports or features which the viewer had to guess whether they were true or false. Mairi McHaffie & Stephen Caro (also Gordon Inglis in 1993) presented the original 1990s show.

== See also ==
- Banzai
- The Day Today
- Brass Eye
- The Lowdown (British TV series)
- Would I Lie to You? (TV series)
- Call My Bluff
