= The Woods (play) =

Play by David Mamet

- Original language: English
- Written by: David Mamet
- Characters: Ruth; Nick
- Setting: A summerhouse in early September

Premiere
- Date: 1977

The Woods is a 1977 play by David Mamet. The show involves a young couple's weekend at a lakeside cabin. Mamet banned the play from being put on in New York in 1985, but lifted the ban unexpectedly in 1996 for actress Danielle Kwatinetz.

== Plot ==
The play is about a couple, Nick and Ruth, spending a night at a house in the country. They push their relationship to the breaking point in a night of stories and fights, only to rediscover their need for one another in the morning.

The play takes place on the front porch of Nick's family's summerhouse, where he and Ruth are spending the night. The Woods ends with a bed-time story, but the final reconciliation remains uncomfortably tempered by the violent core we now know to be hiding beneath the soothing words.

== Productions ==
The original production premiered on November 11, 1977, produced by the St. Nicholas Theatre Company in Chicago, and was directed by Mamet. It starred Patti Lupone and Peter Weller. Set design was by Michael Merritt, lighting by Robert Christen, graphic design by Lois Grimm, and the production was presented in arrangement with Ken Marsolais.

The play's New York City premiere was in 1979, Off-Broadway at the Public Theater, where it was produced by Joseph Papp, directed by Ulu Grosbard, and starred Chris Sarandon and Christine Lahti. Set design was by John Lee Beatty, costume design by Robert Wojewodski, and lighting design by Jennifer Tipton.

In 1982, Mamet directed an Off-Broadway revival of The Woods at the Second Stage Theatre, again starring Patti Lupone and Peter Weller.

In 1985, Mamet imposed a ban on New York productions of the play. In December 1996, Mamet unexpectedly lifted the ban, and granted rights to young producer and actor Danielle Kwatinetz. This resulted a special four-night Off-Off-Broadway engagement at the Producer's Club in January 1997, starring Danielle Kwatinetz and Eric Martin Brown, and directed by David Travis. Lighting design was by Dan and Chris Scully, and set design was by Devorah Herbert.

== Background and analysis ==
The Woods examines the archetypal differences and interplay between men and women. Paul Taylor in The Independent writes that "The Woods ... was expressly written to examine the question 'why don't men and women get along?'"

In the Chicago Reader, Diana Spinrad writes:

The Woods, by David Mamet, is a character study of two people who represent the quintessential male and female, and explores how we manage to survive in the dark primordial forest of relationships. Mamet is particularly interested in women's desire to "nest," and men's fear of it. The problem with The Woods is that, in general, Mamet's perceptions of sexual relationships are a little warped. His characterizations of women suffer acutely from the madonna-whore syndrome. They are sex objects who, at the same time, have a mysterious nurturing quality to them. His men are entrenched in Chicago macho. The characters in The Woods are no exception. The challenge of the piece, then, is for the director and actors to create two interesting characters who can stand as individuals, above the stereotypes set for them, and who can make the action clear within an essentially static situation.

Sarah Lansdale Stevenson notes the play's "precision of ... language," "rhythm and repetition," "intricate image patterns," and "elegant simplicity of image patterns," and observes that:

The two lovers ultimately fail to communicate or to connect. This inability to come together [is] emphasized by the constant reiteration of images of falling — of falling from great distances, of falling down or of falling away, and of rain constantly falling.

And Mamet opines that, "It is a dreamy play, full of the symbology of dream and the symbology of myth, which are basically the same thing."

== Reception ==
Although The Woods has always maintained a certain following, critical reception of the play has tended to be indifferent or harsh. On the 1982 New York revival, Frank Rich wrote in the New York Times:

There are no characters here, no arresting language — just a pseudo-abstract, fractionalized, monosyllabic surface spread over an emotional vacuum. Ruth and Nick speak in vague, ostensibly punchy sentences whose dead nouns (things, stuff) and circumlocutions (If we can't know ourselves, how can we know ourselves?) lead nowhere. Linguistic coloration comes in the form of unconvincing nature imagery: sea gulls, frogs, raccoons, bears, birds, fish and, heaven help us, some cawing herons are forever rearing their cute little heads.

Mamet himself has said:

People do not understand The Woods very well — I think partly because it is a play about heterosexuality, which is just not a hot theatrical topic over here. It is something that you look at in the popular media, a subject that people would rather not address — why men and women have a hard time trying to get along with each other.
