= True and False: Heresy and Common Sense for the Actor =

Instructional book on acting

True and False: Heresy and Common Sense for the Actor by David Mamet is a 1997 instructional book on acting, and the life and habits of the successful actor. In it, Mamet outlines his thoughts on acting, and gives advice for those practicing the craft and for aspiring practitioners.

In the book, Mamet derides the practice of teaching drama students the system of Constantin Stanislavski or method acting of Lee Strasberg. In Mamet's opinion, time spent searching for emotion memory or considering character's biographies is time wasted, and he suspects that it is an academic bluff working to keep actors uncertain. He also argues that the accomplishments of the Method "greats" (Brando, De Niro et al.) were due to natural talent and fierce determination rather than a specific academic methodology.

He recommends a simple, 'honest' style of acting, where the actor's job is to learn the lines, find their mark, and speak up simply. Work on character, he asserts, is the playwright's job. Mamet advocates an acting process that posits that acting is a craft born out of the repeated application of a few straightforward, basic principles. Mamet uses the book to speak out against such practices as emotional preparation and the creation of an imaginary world in which to live while acting.

Since its publication, True and False has proved to be a controversial volume. Admirers point to its practical, straightforward advice, while detractors have charged that its approach is too reductionist, and that Mamet's beliefs contradict the existence of drama schools. Actor Anthony Hopkins praised True And False as "[demolishing] the myths and the psychobabble-gobbledygook that pass for theory with regard to acting" and described it as "a revealing book of the highest order".

== Bibliography ==
- Mamet, David (1999). True and False : Heresy and Common Sense for the Actor. Vintage ISBN 0-679-77264-2
