= The Spanish Prisoner =

1997 film by David Mamet

- Theatrical release poster
- Directed by: David Mamet
- Written by: David Mamet
- Produced by: Jean Doumanian
- Starring: Ben Gazzara; Felicity Huffman; Ricky Jay; Steve Martin; Rebecca Pidgeon; Campbell Scott
- Cinematography: Gabriel Beristain
- Edited by: Barbara Tulliver
- Music by: Carter Burwell
- Production companies: Jasmine Productions Inc.; Jean Doumanian Productions; Magnolia Films; Sweetland Films
- Distributed by: Sony Pictures Classics
- Release dates: September 8, 1997 (Toronto International Film Festival); April 3, 1998 (United States)
- Running time: 110 minutes
- Country: United States
- Language: English
- Budget: $10 million
- Box office: $13.8 million

The Spanish Prisoner is a 1997 American neo-noir suspense film, written and directed by David Mamet and starring Campbell Scott, Steve Martin, Rebecca Pidgeon, Ben Gazzara, Felicity Huffman and Ricky Jay. It tells a story of corporate espionage conducted through an elaborate confidence game.

In 1999 it was nominated by the Mystery Writers of America for the Edgar Award for Best Motion Picture Screenplay.

== Plot ==
Corporate engineer Joe Ross has invented a potentially lucrative "process", the precise nature of which is never revealed. While on a retreat on the island of St. Estèphe, he meets wealthy stranger Julian "Jimmy" Dell and attracts the interest of one of the company's new secretaries, Susan Ricci.

Jimmy wants to introduce Joe to his sister, an Olympic-class tennis player, in New York and asks him to deliver a package to her. Susan sits near Joe on the airplane back to New York, converses with him about how "you never know who anybody is," and talks about unwitting drug mules. Suddenly afraid the package might contain something illegal, he opens it on the plane but finds only a 1939 edition of the book Budge on Tennis, which he damages while opening. Once home, he buys an intact copy of the book and drops it at Jimmy's sister’s building, keeping the original at his office.

Jimmy suggests that Joe's boss, Mr. Klein, might not give him fair compensation for his work. Jimmy invites Joe to dinner, and seemingly on a lark opens a Swiss bank account for him with a token balance of 15 Swiss francs. Taking him to dinner at a club requiring membership, Jimmy has Joe sign a certificate to join. Over dinner, he advises Joe to consult legal counsel about his position in the company regarding the Process. He invites Joe to meet with his own lawyer and tells him to bring along the only copy of the Process.

Joe soon learns that Jimmy's sister does not exist, and realizes Jimmy is a con artist attempting to steal the Process. Joe contacts Pat McCune, a woman he met on the island who Susan told him was an FBI agent, and whose business card Susan had kept. McCune’s FBI squad enlists him in a sting operation to catch Jimmy. While fitting Joe with a wire for his planned meeting with Jimmy, an FBI agent explains the Spanish Prisoner con, a version of which Jimmy has been running on Joe. When Jimmy never shows up for the meeting, Joe realizes McCune is actually part of Jimmy's con game, and that the Process has just been stolen.

Joe attempts to explain what happened to his employer and the police but finds that Jimmy has made it appear that he has sold his Process to the Japanese. The Swiss bank account that Jimmy opened for him makes it look as though he is hiding assets, and the certificate he signed to join the club turns out to be a request for political asylum in Venezuela, which has no extradition treaty with the United States. The police show Joe that Jimmy's apartment is a façade and that the club's members-only room is a normal restaurant. Joe is also framed for the murder of the company lawyer, George Lang.

On the run, Joe reconnects with Susan, who says she believes his story. Joe remembers that the hotel on the island maintains video surveillance, which could prove that Jimmy was there. Susan takes him to the airport so he can fly back to the island. Seeing a police roadblock on the way to the airport, she convinces him to drive to Boston.

At the airport in Boston, Susan gives Joe a plane ticket, and a camera bag, which unbeknownst to him contains a gun. Before passing through security, he realizes that Jimmy left his fingerprints on the book Joe was to deliver. He leaves the airport with Susan, still not realizing she is working against him. They purchase ferry tickets to return home. While Susan leaves to call Klein to inform him about the book, Joe attempts to board the ferry with the plane ticket, only to realize the ticket is for Venezuela, and that he was being set up.

On the ferry, Jimmy suddenly appears and Susan turns on Joe; the final step of the con will be Joe's death, made to appear as a suicide. Jimmy reveals what he has done with the Process, and turns his gun on Joe, but is tranquilized by US Marshals pretending to be Japanese tourists. They reveal that they have been following Jimmy for months and that Mr. Klein plotted the con to keep all the profits for himself. Susan asks Joe for mercy, but he nonchalantly tells her she must "spend some time in [her] room", meaning prison.

== Cast ==
- Campbell Scott as Joe Ross
- Steve Martin as Jimmy Dell
- Rebecca Pidgeon as Susan
- Ben Gazzara as Mr. Klein
- Ricky Jay as George Lang
- Felicity Huffman as FBI Agent McCune
- Ed O'Neill as FBI Team Leader
- Takeo Matsushita as United States Marshal
- Keiko Seiko (as Seiko Yoshida) as United States Marshal
- Jonathan Katz as Lawyer
- Clark Gregg as FBI Sniper

== Dialogue ==
David Mamet is famous for the style of dialogue he writes, which is characterized by incomplete sentences, foul language, stutters, restarts, and interruptions; it is known as "Mamet-speak".

Here, Roger Ebert observes, "His characters often speak as if they're wary of the world, afraid of being misquoted, reluctant to say what's on their minds: As a protective shield, they fall into precise legalisms, invoking old sayings as if they're magic charms. Often they punctuate their dialogue with four-letter words, but in The Spanish Prisoner there is not a single obscenity, and we picture Mamet with a proud grin on his face, collecting his very first PG rating".

Andrew Sarris wrote, "I liked The Spanish Prisoner because its very lightness in Mr. Mamet's mind as a minor genre entertainment enabled him to escape the pomposity and pretentiousness of recent Mamet movies and plays in which his cryptic phrases and ponderous pauses were supposed to suggest all sorts of psychic panic and moral havoc in a malignant society. By disdaining to look and sound like anything overly serious, Mr. Mamet's Pinteresque speech rhythms succeed as nothing since Glengarry Glen Ross (1984 on stage, 1992 on screen) in capturing something pervasively paranoid in contemporary life. ... To enjoy the twists and turns in Mr. Mamet's puzzle-like plot, one must remain detached from the nominal protagonist. This is accomplished by having the character share the faux-naïf speech rhythms and materialistic values of his employers and his business associates. ... Joe doesn't trust his boss, Klein (Ben Gazzara), who keeps reiterating that Joe has nothing to worry about, which in malicious Mamet-speak, means that Joe has a lot to worry about".

Chris Grunden wrote in Film Journal International: "David Mamet's new film features the writer-director's trademark staccato dialogue, but, as in his earlier House of Games, the film's stylized language (which can become wearying in some Mamet scripts) is matched with a confidence-scam plot that's almost dizzyingly complex, and is completely absorbing from start to finish".

== Reception ==
Roger Ebert gave The Spanish Prisoner three and a half out of four stars, calling it "delightful" and comparing it to works of Alfred Hitchcock. James Berardinelli of Reelviews.net, who gave it 3 out of 4 stars, compared it to Hitchcock's works, claiming that it "supplies us with a seemingly-endless series of twists and turns, only a fraction of which are predictable" as well as praising the actors by saying that "nearly every major performance is impeccable".

Chris Grunden of Film Journal International compared the film to Hitchcock's Strangers on a Train and The Man Who Knew Too Much: "Somewhere Alfred Hitchcock is smiling, for The Spanish Prisoner is the most deliciously labyrinthine homage to the master of suspense in recent years ... Campbell Scott elicits just the right amount of youthful vanity, which gradually crumbles as he gets increasingly entrapped in the scheme to play him for a fool. Martin's supremely cool, calculatingly menacing turn as the enigmatic Jimmy Dell neatly contrasts Scott's golden-boy image. The strong supporting cast features fine work ... Barbara Tulliver's editing is crisp—the pacing never flags for a moment—and Carter Burwell's score is fabulously moody and evocative".

Reviewer Paul Tatara, on the other hand, criticized the film for using well-worn plot mechanisms, "stiff characterizations and ridiculous line readings".

On Rotten Tomatoes, the film holds a rating of 89% from 61 reviews with the consensus: "The Spanish Prisoner delivers just what fans of writer-director David Mamet expect: a smart, solidly constructed drama that keeps viewers guessing ... and entertained along the way." Metacritic, which uses a weighted average, assigned the film a score of 71 out of 100, based on 21 critics, indicating "generally favorable" reviews.

=== Accolades ===
For his screenplay, David Mamet was nominated for an Edgar Allan Poe Award for Best Motion Picture Screenplay, a Chlotrudis Award, and an Independent Spirit Award for Best Screenplay.
