= David Mamet =

American playwright, author, and filmmaker (born 1947)

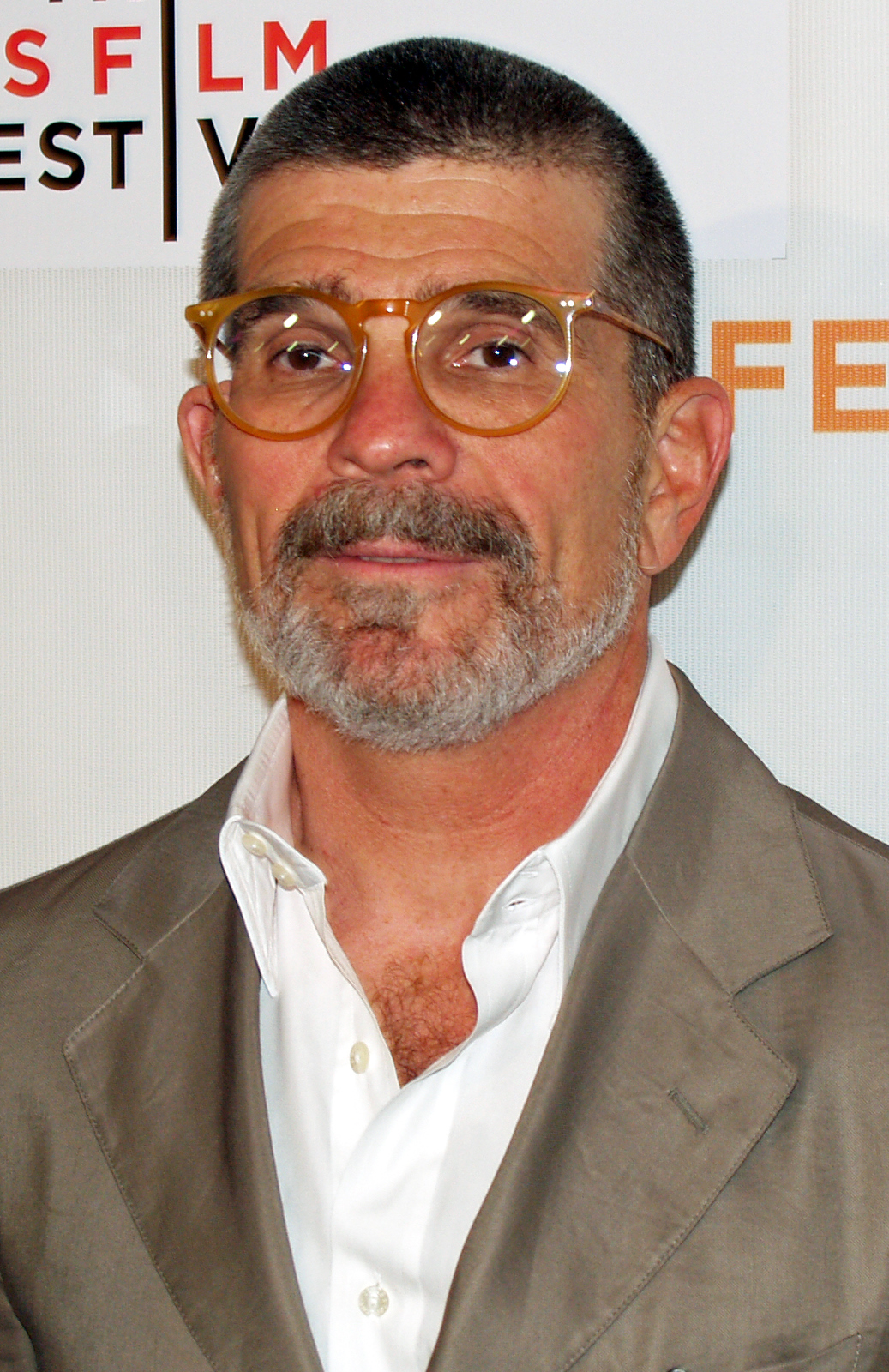
- Mamet in 2008
- Born: November 30, 1947 (age 78); Chicago, Illinois, U.S.
- Education: Goddard College (BA)
- Occupations: Playwright; author; screenwriter; film director
- Spouses: Lindsay Crouse (m. 1977; div. 1990) Rebecca Pidgeon (m. 1991)
- Children: Four, including Zosia Mamet and Clara Mamet
- Writing career
- Period: 1970–present
- Notable works: The Duck Variations (1971); Sexual Perversity in Chicago (1974); Glengarry Glen Ross (1983)

David Alan Mamet (/ˈmæmɪt/; born November 30, 1947) is an American playwright, author, and filmmaker. He won a Pulitzer Prize and received Tony nominations for his plays Glengarry Glen Ross (1983) and Speed-the-Plow (1988). He first gained critical acclaim for a trio of 1970s off-Broadway plays: The Duck Variations, Sexual Perversity in Chicago, and American Buffalo. His plays Race and The Penitent, respectively, opened on Broadway in 2009 and previewed off-Broadway in 2017.

Feature films that Mamet both wrote and directed include House of Games (1987), Homicide (1991), The Spanish Prisoner (1997), and his biggest commercial success, Heist (2001). His screenwriting credits include The Postman Always Rings Twice (1981), The Verdict (1982), The Untouchables (1987), Hoffa (1992), Wag the Dog (1997), and Hannibal (2001). Mamet himself wrote the screenplay for the 1992 adaptation of Glengarry Glen Ross, and wrote and directed the 1994 adaptation of his play Oleanna (1992). He created and produced the CBS series The Unit (2006–2009).

Mamet's books include: On Directing Film (1991), a commentary and dialogue about film-making; The Old Religion (1997), a novel about the lynching of Leo Frank; Five Cities of Refuge: Weekly Reflections on Genesis, Exodus, Leviticus, Numbers and Deuteronomy (2004), a Torah commentary with Rabbi Lawrence Kushner; The Wicked Son (2006), a study of Jewish self-hatred and antisemitism; Bambi vs. Godzilla, a commentary on the movie business; The Secret Knowledge: On the Dismantling of American Culture (2011), a commentary on cultural and political issues; Three War Stories (2013), a trio of novellas about the physical and psychological effects of war; and Everywhere an Oink Oink: An Embittered, Dyspeptic, and Accurate Report of Forty Years in Hollywood (2023), an autobiographical account of his experiences in Hollywood.

== Early life and education ==
Mamet was born in 1947 in Chicago to Lenore June (née Silver), a teacher, and Bernard Morris Mamet, a labor attorney. He is Jewish. His paternal grandparents were Polish Jews. Mamet has said his parents were communists and described himself as a "red diaper baby". One of his earliest jobs was as a busboy at Chicago's London House and The Second City. He also worked as an actor, editor for Oui magazine, and as a cab driver. He was educated at the progressive Francis W. Parker School and at Goddard College in Plainfield, Vermont. At the Chicago Public Library Foundation 20th anniversary fundraiser in 2006, Mamet stated, "My alma mater is the Chicago Public Library. I got what little educational foundation I got in the third-floor reading room, under the tutelage of a Coca-Cola sign".

After a move to Chicago's North Side, Mamet met theater director Robert Sickinger and began to work occasionally at Sickinger's Hull House Theatre. Thus began Mamet's lifelong involvement with the theater.

== Career ==
=== Theater ===
Mamet is a founding member of the Atlantic Theater Company; he first gained acclaim for a trio of off-Broadway plays in 1976, The Duck Variations, Sexual Perversity in Chicago, and American Buffalo. He was awarded the Pulitzer Prize in 1984 for Glengarry Glen Ross, which received its first Broadway revival in the summer of 2005. His plays American Buffalo and Speed-the-Plow were included on Harold Bloom's list of works constituting the Western Canon. His play Race, which opened on Broadway on December 6, 2009, and featured James Spader, David Alan Grier, Kerry Washington, and Richard Thomas in the cast, received mixed reviews. His play The Anarchist, starring Patti LuPone and Debra Winger, in her Broadway debut, opened on Broadway on November 13, 2012, in previews and was scheduled to close on December 16, 2012. His 2017 play The Penitent previewed off-Broadway on February 8, 2017.

In 2002, Mamet was inducted into the American Theater Hall of Fame. Mamet later received the PEN/Laura Pels Theater Award for Grand Master of American Theater in 2010. In 2017, Mamet released an online class for writers entitled David Mamet teaches dramatic writing.

In 2019 Mamet returned to the London West End with a new play, Bitter Wheat, at the Garrick Theatre, starring John Malkovich. In 2023 it was announced that a new Mamet play, titled Henry Johnson, was expected to debut in Los Angeles starring Shia LaBeouf.

=== Film ===
Mamet's first film work was as a screenwriter, later directing his own scripts. According to Joe Mantegna, Mamet worked as a script doctor for the 1978 film Towing. Mamet's first produced screenplay was the 1981 production of The Postman Always Rings Twice, based on James M. Cain's novel. He received an Academy Award nomination one year later for the 1982 legal drama, The Verdict. He also wrote the screenplays for The Untouchables (1987), Hoffa (1992), The Edge (1997), Wag the Dog (1997), Ronin (1998), and Hannibal (2001). He received a second Academy Award nomination for Wag the Dog.

In 1987, Mamet made his film directing debut with his screenplay House of Games, which won the Golden Osella Best Screenplay awards at the 1987 Venice Film Festival and the Film of the Year in 1989 from the London Film Critics' Circle Awards. The film starred his then-wife, Lindsay Crouse, and many longtime stage associates and friends, including fellow Goddard College graduates. Mamet was quoted as saying, "It was my first film as a director and I needed support, so I stacked the deck." After House of Games, Mamet later wrote and directed two more films focusing on the world of con artists, The Spanish Prisoner (1997) and Heist (2001). Among those films, Heist enjoyed the biggest commercial success.

Other films that Mamet both wrote and directed include: Things Change (1988), Homicide (1991) (nominated for the Palme d'Or at 1991 Cannes Film Festival and won a "Screenwriter of the Year" award for Mamet from the London Film Critics' Circle Awards), Oleanna (1994), The Winslow Boy (1999), State and Main (2000), Spartan (2004), Redbelt (2008), and the 2013 bio-pic TV movie Phil Spector.

A feature-length film, a thriller titled Blackbird, was intended for release in 2015, but is still in development.

When Mamet adapted his play for the 1992 film Glengarry Glen Ross, he wrote an additional part (including the monologue "Coffee's for closers") for Alec Baldwin.

Mamet continues to work with an informal repertory company for his films, including Crouse, William H. Macy, Joe Mantegna, and Rebecca Pidgeon, as well as the aforementioned school friends.

Mamet rewrote the script for Ronin under the pseudonym "Richard Weisz" and turned in an early version of a script for Malcolm X which was rejected by director Spike Lee. Mamet also wrote an unproduced biopic script about Roscoe Arbuckle with Chris Farley intended to portray him. In 2000, Mamet directed a film version of Catastrophe, a one-act play by Samuel Beckett featuring Harold Pinter and John Gielgud (in his final screen performance). In 2008, he wrote and directed the mixed martial arts movie Redbelt, about a martial arts instructor tricked into fighting in a professional bout.

In On Directing Film, Mamet advocates for a method of storytelling based on Eisenstein's montage theory, stating that the story should be told through the juxtaposition of uninflected images. This method relies heavily on the cut between scenes, and Mamet urges directors to eliminate as much narration as possible. Mamet asserts that directors should focus on getting the point of a scene across, rather than simply following a protagonist, or adding visually beautiful or intriguing shots. Films should create order from disorder in search of the objective.

In 2023, reports emerged that Mamet would direct and co-write a new film titled Assassination, his first film since 2008. The film will center around the Chicago Mob ordering the assassination of John F. Kennedy, and will star Viggo Mortensen, Shia LaBeouf, Courtney Love, Al Pacino, and John Travolta. The film's production was scheduled to start in September 2023. In October, Barry Levinson took over as the film's director, while Mamet remained as the screenwriter.

In June 2024, Deadline reported that the film, titled The Prince, will be directed by Cameron Van Hoy, which will center around Hunter Biden, the second son of Former U.S. President Joe Biden. It will star Scott Haze as the lead character Parker; alongside Nicolas Cage, J.K. Simmons, Giancarlo Esposito, and Andy Garcia. Mamet added that the film won't be "a travelogue", and will be inspired by Hunter's life, rather than serve as a biopic.

In early 2026, it was announced that Mamet would direct an adaptation of his Tony-winning play Speed-the-Plow. Starring Anthony Mackie, Ben Mendelsohn, Sharon Stone, Rebecca Pidgeon, and Emily Alyn Lind, it will be his first Hollywood production since 2008. Pre-production started in February 2026, while principal production is expected to start on by February 18, in Atlanta.

=== Books ===
Mamet published the essay collection Writing in Restaurants in 1986, followed by the poetry collection The Hero Pony in 1990. He has also published a series of short plays, monologues and four novels, The Village (1994), The Old Religion (1997), Wilson: A Consideration of the Sources (2000), and Chicago (2018). He has written several non-fiction texts, and children's stories, including True and False: Heresy and Common Sense for the Actor (1997). In 2004 he published a lauded version of the classical Faust story, Faustus, however, when the play was staged in San Francisco during the spring of 2004, it was not well received by critics. On May 1, 2010, Mamet released a graphic novel The Trials of Roderick Spode (The Human Ant).

Mamet detailed his conversion from modern liberalism to "a reformed liberal" in The Secret Knowledge: On the Dismantling of American Culture in 2011. Mamet published Three War Stories, a collection of novellas, in 2013; the novel The Diary of a Porn Star by Priscilla Wriston-Ranger: As Told to David Mamet With an Afterword by Mr. Mamet in 2019; and the political commentary Recessional: The Death of Free Speech and the Cost of a Free Lunch in 2022. In 2023 Mamet recounted his experiences in Hollywood and the movie-making industry in Everywhere an Oink Oink: An Embittered, Dyspeptic, and Accurate Report of Forty Years in Hollywood.

=== Television and radio ===
Mamet wrote one episode of Hill Street Blues, "A Wasted Weekend", that aired in 1987. His then-wife, Lindsay Crouse, appeared in numerous episodes (including that one) as Officer McBride. Mamet is also the creator, producer and frequent writer of the television series The Unit, where he wrote a well-circulated memo to the writing staff. He directed a third-season episode of The Shield with Shawn Ryan. In 2007, Mamet directed two television commercials for Ford Motor Company. The two 30-second ads featured the Ford Edge and were filmed in Mamet's signature style of fast-paced dialogue and clear, simple imagery. Mamet's sister, Lynn, is a producer and writer for television shows, such as The Unit and Law & Order.

Mamet has contributed several dramas to BBC Radio through Jarvis & Ayres Productions, including an adaptation of Glengarry Glen Ross for BBC Radio 3 and new dramas for BBC Radio 4. The comedy Keep Your Pantheon (or On the Whole I'd Rather Be in Mesopotamia) was aired in 2007. The Christopher Boy's Communion was another Jarvis & Ayres production, first broadcast on BBC Radio 4 on March 8, 2021.

== Style and reception ==
=== Mamet speak ===
Mamet's style of writing dialogue, marked by a cynical, street-smart edge, has come to be called Mamet speak. Mamet himself has criticized his (and other writers') tendency to write "pretty" at the expense of sound, logical plots. When asked how he developed his style for writing dialogue, Mamet said, "In my family, in the days prior to television, we liked to while away the evenings by making ourselves miserable, based solely on our ability to speak the language viciously. That's probably where my ability was honed."

=== Gender issues ===
Mamet's plays have frequently sparked debate and controversy. Following a 1992 staging of Oleanna, a play in which a college student accuses her professor of trying to rape her, a critic reported that the play divided the audience by gender and recounted that "couples emerged screaming at each other".

In his 2014 book David Mamet and Male Friendship, Arthur Holmberg examined Mamet's portrayal of male friendships, especially focusing on the contradictions and ambiguities of male bonding as dramatized in Mamet's plays and films.

=== Archives ===
The papers of David Mamet were sold to the Harry Ransom Center at the University of Texas at Austin in 2007 and first opened for research in 2009. The growing collection consists mainly of manuscripts and related production materials for most of his plays, films, and other writings, but also includes his personal journals from 1966 to 2005. In 2015, the Ransom Center secured a second major addition to Mamet's papers, including more recent works. Additional materials relating to Mamet and his career can be found in the Ransom Center's collections of Robert De Niro, Mel Gussow, Tom Stoppard, Sam Shepard, Paul Schrader, Don DeLillo, and John Russell Brown.

== Personal life ==
Mamet and actress Lindsay Crouse married in 1977 and divorced in 1990. The couple have two children, Willa and Zosia Mamet. Mamet has been married to actress and singer-songwriter Rebecca Pidgeon since 1991, and they have two children. Mamet and Pidgeon live in Santa Monica, California.

Mamet is a Reform Jew and Zionist.

=== Political views ===
In 2005, Mamet became a contributing blogger for The Huffington Post, drawing satirical cartoons with themes including political strife in Israel. In a 2008 essay at The Village Voice titled "Why I Am No Longer a 'Brain-Dead Liberal'" he discussed how his political views had shifted from liberalism to conservatism. In interviews, Mamet has highlighted his agreement with free market theorists such as Friedrich Hayek, the historian Paul Johnson, and economist Thomas Sowell, whom Mamet called "one of our greatest minds". In 2022, Mamet declined to explicitly label himself a Republican, but described himself as a conservative who "would like to conserve those things I grew up with: the love of family, the love of the country, love of service, love of God, love of community".

During promotion of a book, Mamet said British people had "a taint of anti-semitism," saying they "want to give [Israel] away to some people whose claim is rather dubious." In the same interview, Mamet went on to say that "there are famous dramatists and novelists [in the UK] whose works are full of anti-Semitic filth." He refused to give examples because of British libel laws (the interview was conducted in New York City for the Financial Times). He is known for his pro-Israel positions; in his book The Secret Knowledge he said that "Israelis would like to live in peace within their borders; the Arabs would like to kill them all."

Mamet endorsed Republican Mitt Romney for president in 2012, and wrote an article for The Jewish Journal of Greater Los Angeles imploring fellow Jewish Americans to vote for Romney.

In an essay for Newsweek, published on January 29, 2013, Mamet argued against gun control laws: "It was intended to guard us against this inevitable decay of government that the Constitution was written. Its purpose was and is not to enthrone a Government superior to an imperfect and confused electorate, but to protect us from such a government."

Mamet has described the NFL anthem protests as "absolutely fucking despicable". In a 2020 interview, he described Donald Trump as a "great president" and supported his re-election. After Trump lost the election, Mamet appeared to endorse claims that the election had been illegitimate in his 2022 book Recessional: The Death of Free Speech and the Cost of a Free Lunch, though shortly after its publication, he said he "misspoke" on the subject.

In 2022, Mamet made comments in support of Florida's Parental Rights in Education Act, called the "Don't Say Gay" bill by its critics, which restricts what public school teachers in Florida can discuss with children in kindergarten through third grade about sexual orientation and gender identity. In an interview with Fox News, Mamet said that the law was necessary because teachers "are abusing [children] mentally and using sex to do so", further alleging that "teachers are inclined, particularly men because men are predators, to pedophilia".

== Works ==
=== Theatre ===
- Lakeboat (1970)
- The Duck Variations (1972)
- Lone Canoe or The Explorer (1979)
- Sexual Perversity in Chicago (1974)
- Squirrels (1974)
- American Buffalo (1975)
- Reunion (1976)
- The Water Engine (1976)
- A Life in the Theatre (1977)
- The Woods (1977)
- The Revenge of the Space Pandas, or Binky Rudich and the Two-Speed Clock (1978)
- Mr. Happiness (1978)
- Prairie du Chien (1978)
- The Blue Hour (1979)
- Lakeboat (revision) (1980)
- Edmond (1982)
- The Frog Prince (1983)
- Glengarry Glen Ross (1983)
- The Shawl (1985)
- Goldberg Street: Short Plays and Monologues (1985)
- The Poet & The Rent (1986)
- Speed-the-Plow (1988)
- Bobby Gould in Hell (1989)
- Oleanna (1992)
- The Cryptogram (1994)
- The Old Neighborhood (1997)
- Boston Marriage (1999)
- Faustus (2004)
- Romance (2005)
- The Voysey Inheritance (adaptation) (2005)
- Keep Your Pantheon (2007)
- November (2007)
- The Vikings and Darwin (2008)
- Race (2009)
- School (2009)
- The Anarchist (2012)
- China Doll (2015)
- The Penitent (2017)
- Bitter Wheat (2019)
- The Christopher Boy's Communion (2020)
- Henry Johnson (2023)

=== Film ===
Year	Title	Director	Writer	Notes
1981	The Postman Always Rings Twice	No	Yes	
1982	The Verdict	No	Yes	
1987	The Untouchables	No	Yes	
1987	House of Games	Yes	Yes	
1988	Things Change	Yes	Yes	
1989	We're No Angels	No	Yes	
1991	Homicide	Yes	Yes	
1992	Glengarry Glen Ross	No	Yes	Also based on his play
1992	Hoffa	No	Yes	Also associate producer
1994	Oleanna	Yes	Yes	Also based on his play
1996	American Buffalo	No	Yes	Also based on his play
1997	The Spanish Prisoner	Yes	Yes	
1997	The Edge	No	Yes	
1997	Wag the Dog	No	Yes	
1998	Ronin	No	Yes	Credited as "Richard Weisz"
1999	The Winslow Boy	Yes	Yes	
2000	Lakeboat	No	Yes	Also based on his play
2000	State and Main	Yes	Yes	
2001	Hannibal	No	Yes	
2001	Heist	Yes	Yes	
2004	Spartan	Yes	Yes	
2005	Edmond	No	Yes	Also based on his play
2008	Redbelt	Yes	Yes	
2023	The Penitent	No	Yes	Also based on his play
2025	Henry Johnson	Yes	Yes	Also based on his play
TBA	The Prince	No	Yes	Post-production
TBA	Speed-the-Plow	Yes	Yes	Also based on his play; Post-production

Short film

Year	Title	Director	Writer
2000	Catastrophe	Yes	No
2010	Lost Masterpieces of Pornography	Yes	Yes
2010	Inside the Actor's Workshop	Yes	Yes
2010	The Marquee	Yes	Yes
2010	Our Valley	Yes	Yes
2010	Two Painters	Yes	Yes

Acting roles

Year	Title	Role	Notes
1987	Black Widow	Herb	
2023	Beau Is Afraid	Rabbi	Voice role
2025	Marty Supreme	Glenn Nordmann	

=== Television ===
Year	Title	Director	Writer	Executive Producer	Notes
1987	Hill Street Blues	No	Yes	No	Episode "A Wasted Weekend"
1996	Ricky Jay and His 52 Assistants	Yes	No	No	TV special
2004	The Shield	Yes	No	No	Episode "Strays"
2006–2009	The Unit	Yes	Yes	Yes	Also creator Directed 4 episodes, wrote 11 episodes

TV movies

Year	Title	Director	Writer	Executive Producer	Notes
1992	The Water Engine	No	Yes	No	Also based on his play
1993	A Life in the Theatre	No	Yes	Yes	Also based on his play
1994	Texan	No	Yes	No	
1999	Lansky	No	Yes	Yes	
2013	Phil Spector	Yes	Yes	Yes	

Acting roles

Year	Title	Role	Notes
1992	The Water Engine	Brown Haired Man	TV movie
1996	Dr. Katz, Professional Therapist	Himself (voice)	Episode "New Telephone System"
2011	The Simpsons	Himself (voice)	Episode "Homer the Father"

== Awards and nominations ==
Association	Year	Category	Project	Result	Ref.
Theater Awards
Drama Desk Awards	1977	Outstanding Play	American Buffalo	Nominated	
Drama Desk Awards	1978	Outstanding Play	The Water Engine	Nominated	
Drama Desk Awards	1983	Outstanding Play	Edmond	Nominated	
Drama Desk Awards	1984	Outstanding Play	Glengarry Glen Ross	Nominated	
Drama Desk Awards	1988	Outstanding Play	Speed-the-Plow	Nominated	
Drama Desk Awards	1993	Outstanding Play	Oleanna	Nominated	
Drama Desk Awards	1995	Outstanding Play	The Cryptogram	Nominated	
New York Drama Critics' Circle	1977	Best American Play	American Buffalo	Won	
New York Drama Critics' Circle	1984	Best American Play	Glengarry Glen Ross	Won	
Pulitzer Prize	1984	Drama	Glengarry Glen Ross	Won	
Pulitzer Prize	1995	Drama	The Cryptogram	Nominated	
Tony Awards	1984	Best Play	Glengarry Glen Ross	Nominated	
Tony Awards	1988	Best Play	Speed-the-Plow	Nominated	
Film and Television Awards
Academy Awards	1982	Best Adapted Screenplay	The Verdict	Nominated	
Academy Awards	1997	Best Adapted Screenplay	Wag the Dog	Nominated	
British Academy Film Awards	1998	Best Adapted Screenplay	Wag the Dog	Nominated	
Golden Globe Awards	1983	Best Screenplay	The Verdict	Nominated	
Golden Globe Awards	1987	Best Screenplay	House of Games	Nominated	
Golden Globe Awards	1997	Best Screenplay	Wag the Dog	Nominated	
Primetime Emmy Awards	2013	Outstanding Miniseries or Movie	Phil Spector	Nominated	
Primetime Emmy Awards	2013	Outstanding Directing for a Limited Series or Movie	Phil Spector	Nominated	
Primetime Emmy Awards	2013	Outstanding Writing for a Limited Series or Movie	Phil Spector	Nominated	

== Bibliography ==
- Writing in Restaurants (1987)
- Some Freaks (1989)
- On Directing Film (1991)
- The Cabin: Reminiscence and Diversions (1992)
- The Village (1994)
- A Whore's Profession (1994)
- Make-Believe Town: Essays and Remembrances (1996)
- The Old Religion (1997)
- Three Uses of the Knife (1998)
- True and False: Heresy and Common Sense for the Actor (1999)
- The Chinaman (1999)
- Jafsie and John Henry: Essays (1999)
- Wilson: A Consideration of the Sources (2000)
- South of the Northeast Kingdom (2002)
- Five Cities of Refuge: Weekly Reflections on Genesis, Exodus, Leviticus, Numbers, and Deuteronomy (with Lawrence Kushner) (2003)
- The Wicked Son: Anti-Semitism, Self-hatred, and the Jews (2006)
- Bambi Vs. Godzilla: On the Nature, Purpose, and Practice of the Movie Business (2007)
- Theatre (2010)
- The Trials of Roderick Spode (The Human Ant) (2010)
- The Secret Knowledge: On the Dismantling of American Culture (2011)
- Three War Stories (2013)
- Chicago (2018)
- The Diary of a Porn Star by Priscilla Wriston-Ranger: As Told to David Mamet With an Afterword by Mr. Mamet (2019)
- Recessional: The Death of Free Speech and the Cost of a Free Lunch (2022)
- Everywhere an Oink Oink: An Embittered, Dyspeptic, and Accurate Report of Forty Years in Hollywood (2023)
- The Disenlightenment: Politics, Horror, and Entertainment (2025)

== Unrealized projects ==
- Ace in the Hole remake (1990) – Script for Brian De Palma to direct
- The Autobiography of Malcolm X (1992) – Unused early draft
- Charlie Chan in Horse and Rider (1992) – Script for Warner Bros.
- Ordinary Daylight (1992) – Based on the memoir, for Warner Bros.
- High and Low remake (1993) – Script for Martin Scorsese to direct
- Moby-Dick (1990s) – Based on the novel
- Lolita (1997) – Unused early draft
- Will B. Good (1997) – Based on Frame-Up: The Untold Story of Roscoe "Fatty" Arbuckle
- Diary of a Young London Physician (1998) – Based on Strange Case of Dr Jekyll and Mr Hyde, for Michael Corrente to direct
- Investigation (1999) – Script for USA Films
- Payback (1998) – Based on the novel, for Ted Demme to direct
- Dillinger (2002) – Based on the life of John Dillinger, for Kimberly Peirce to direct
- Joan of Bark: The Dog That Saved France (2004) – Writer/director, for Columbia Pictures
- The Prince of Providence (2004) – Based on the novel, for Michael Corrente to direct
- The Bones (2005) – Based on the novel, for Columbia Pictures
- Whistle (2005) – Based on the novel, for Columbia Pictures
- The Diary of Anne Frank (2009) – Adaptation of the novel, for Disney Pictures
- Come Back to Sorrento (2009) – Based on the novel, for Michael Worth to direct
- Have Gun – Will Travel TV series reboot (2013) – Writer/director, for CBS
- Blackbird (2013) – Writer/director
- 7 Deadly Sins TV miniseries (2013) – Writer/director, for Fox
- The Force (2017) – Based on the novel, for James Mangold to direct
- Assassination (2023) – Writer/director
