= Almost Naked (album) =

1993 album by Ruby Blue

Studio album by Ruby Blue
- Released: 15 March 1993
- Length: 38:51
- Label: Red Flame
- Producer: Ali Staton; John Green

Ruby Blue chronology
Down from Above (1990)	Almost Naked (1993)

Almost Naked is the third and final studio album from the Scottish folk pop band Ruby Blue, released by Red Flame on 15 March 1993.

== Background ==
Almost Naked marked major personnel changes in Ruby Blue as lead vocalist and songwriter Rebecca Pidgeon and multi-instrumentalist Anthony Coote left the band at the end of 1990, following the band's second album Down from Above. The remaining two members, guitarist Roger Fife and backing vocalist Erika Woods (formerly Erika Spotswood), decided to continue as Ruby Blue, with Woods taking Pidgeon's place as the lead vocalist.

Returning to their original independent label Red Flame, the duo began writing and recording demos in 1991. Ruby Blue had briefly become a quartet by mid-1991, with Chris Tait on bass and Pascal Consoli on drums. Working with producer Tony Phillips, who previously produced Down from Above with the band, Ruby Blue released the single "I Feel Good Now" on 17 June 1991. For live dates in the summer of 1991, the band were joined by Paul Harvey on guitar and Phonene Davies on keyboards.

A limited cassette release, Paradise, containing "I Feel Good Now" and eight demo recordings, was made available by Red Flame via mail order in 1991. The record label described the release as being "a bit like a polaroid snap of the new band" and a "taste of a new album in the making". Almost Naked was released by Red Flame on 15 March 1993. A single, "Done My Thinking", was released from the album. The album was not a commercial success and Ruby Blue disbanded shortly after. The band were unable to embark on a tour to promote the album due to financial costs.

== Critical reception ==
Professional ratings
Review scores
Source	Rating
The Encyclopedia of Popular Music	2/4 stars

Upon its release, Music & Media noted the album "varies from sexy soulful pop with contemporary percussion ('Recreate Your Kiss') to music 'of all time', like the piano ballad 'You'll Find Out'." They also praised Woods' "fragile vocals" which they felt "get[s] the right sparse backing". The Daily Mirror picked it as their "album of the week", praising it as an "outstanding set of folk-rock-pop tinged tracks". Kim Morgan of the Kensington News called it "a must for folk music fans".

== Track listing ==
All tracks are written by Roger Fife and Erika Woods except "I Still Love You" by Ali Staton, John Green, Fife and Woods.

No.	Title	Length
1.	"Recreate Your Kiss"	4:09
2.	"New Way"	3:45
3.	"High for a While"	5:12
4.	"Goddess"	3:56
5.	"You'll Find Out"	2:51
6.	"I Still Love You"	3:54
7.	"Done My Thinking"	3:59
8.	"Strength of Mind"	3:34
9.	"Magnificent Truth"	3:45
10.	"Almost Naked"	3:40

== Personnel ==
Ruby Blue

- Erika Woods – lead vocals, backing vocals
- Roger Fife – electric guitar, acoustic guitar, backing vocals

Additional musicians

- Ali Staton – drums, percussion, programming
- John Green – keyboards, piano, string arrangements, backing vocals
- Andrew Smith – wah guitar, rhythm guitar, solo guitar
- Sarah Brown – backing vocals (track 2)

Production

- Ali Staton – production (all tracks)
- John Green – production (all tracks), additional arrangement (track 2)

Other

- Poppy Szaybo – front sleeve and booklet photography
- Marie Ryan – back sleeve photography
