= Behind the Velvet Curtain: Songs from the Motion Picture Redbelt =

Behind the Velvet Curtain

Studio album by Rebecca Pidgeon
- Released: April 15, 2008
- Studio: Paramount Recording Studio, Hollywood; Encore Studio, Burbank; Track Record, North Hollywood
- Genre: Adult alternative, vocal jazz
- Length: 43:12
- Label: Great American Music
- Producer: Larry Klein

Rebecca Pidgeon chronology
Tough on Crime (2005)	Behind the Velvet Curtain (2008)	Slingshot (2012)

Behind the Velvet Curtain is an album by Rebecca Pidgeon. She wrote all the songs except for a cover version of "Wouldn't It Be Nice" by the Beach Boys and "Been and Gone", which she wrote with David Mamet. Four songs appeared in the movie Redbelt, including "When You Were Mine" with backing vocals by Luciana Souza.

== Track listing ==
All tracks are written by Rebecca Pidgeon except where indicated.

No.	Title	Writer(s)	Length
1.	"Behind the Velvet Curtain"		4:43
2.	"Long Island Poem"		3:39
3.	"Dawn"		4:03
4.	"Baby, Please Come Home to Me"		3:15
5.	"When You Were Mine"		4:59
6.	"That's Life, That's Hollywood"		4:44
7.	"Wouldn't It Be Nice"	Brian Wilson, Tony Asher	3:15
8.	"Been and Gone"	Rebecca Pidgeon, David Mamet	3:43
9.	"Manha"		10:51

== Personnel ==
- Rebecca Pidgeon – vocals, backing vocals
- Larry Goldings – Wurlitzer electric piano
- Dean Parks – electric guitar, acoustic guitar, nylon string guitar, ukulele
- Greg Leisz – pedal steel guitar
- Willie Aron – acoustic guitar, backing vocals
- Larry Koonse – nylon string guitar
- David Piltch – bass
- Larry Klein – bass
- Jay Bellerose – drums, percussion
- Danny Frankel – drums, percussion
- Debra Dobkin – drums, percussion
- Paulinho da Costa – percussion
- Luciana Souza – backing vocals

Production

- Larry Klein – producer
- Bernie Grundman – mastering
- Helik Hadar – engineer, mixing
