= Rebecca Pidgeon =

American actress, singer, and songwriter (born 1965)

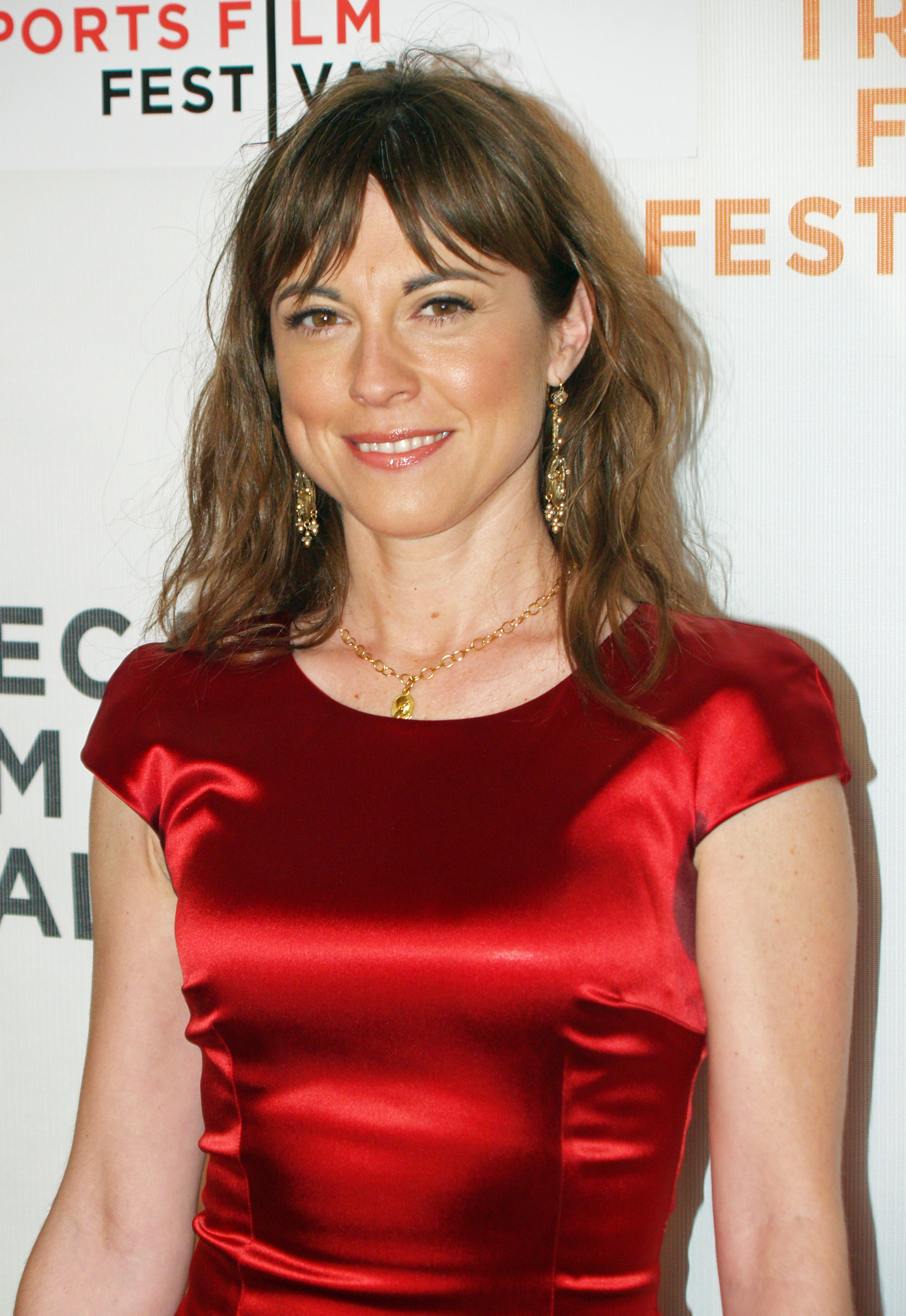
- Pidgeon at the premiere of Redbelt, April 2008
- Born: October 10, 1965 (age 61); Cambridge, Massachusetts, U.S.
- Occupations: Actress, singer, songwriter
- Years active: 1986–present
- Spouse: David Mamet (m. 1991)
- Children: 2, including Clara Mamet
- Musical career
- Genres: Folk, pop
- Instruments: Guitar, vocals
- Labels: Chesky, Decca
- Formerly of: Ruby Blue
- Website: rebeccapidgeonmusic.com

Rebecca Pidgeon (born October 10, 1965) is an American-British actress who has appeared on stage and in feature films. She is also a singer, songwriter and recording artist.

== Early life ==
Pidgeon was born to English parents in Cambridge, Massachusetts, while her father, Carl R. Pidgeon, was a visiting professor at MIT. Her mother, Elaine, is a yoga teacher. Her paternal grandmother, Monica Pidgeon, the editor of Architectural Design, was the sister of artist Olga Lehmann and academic Andrew George Lehmann.

Pidgeon moved to Edinburgh, Scotland in 1970 with her parents. She graduated from the Royal Academy of Dramatic Art in London with classmates Clive Owen and Liza Tarbuck.

== Career ==
From 1986 to 1990, Pidgeon was the lead singer of the British folk/pop band Ruby Blue. She left the group without notice shortly after they released their major record label debut after going on holiday to America. She confirmed several weeks later, via her lawyer, that she would not be returning. She released the album The Raven in 1994, followed by The New York Girls' Club (1996), and The Four Marys (1998), a collection of traditional Celtic folk songs. Tough on Crime (2005) featured Walter Becker on guitar and Billy Preston on keyboards. Behind the Velvet Curtain (2008) included a cover version of the Beach Boys song "Wouldn't It Be Nice". Slingshot was released in 2012.

She appeared in her first feature film, The Dawning, in 1988, then starred in David Mamet's plays and films, beginning with the movie Homicide and the play Oleanna, a part Mamet wrote for her. She composed the music for the film version, which starred Debra Eisenstadt in her role.

Pidgeon has had roles in additional Mamet films, including The Spanish Prisoner (1997), The Winslow Boy (1999), State and Main (2000), Heist (2001) and Redbelt (2008). She had a supporting role in Red (2010). In the 2013 television movie Phil Spector, she played a supporting role and also sang "Spanish Harlem" over the closing credits. She appeared in the U.S. television series The Unit as Charlotte Ryan, and in the 2007 television film Jesse Stone: Sea Change as Leeann Lewis, a murder/bank robbery suspect.

== Personal life ==
Pidgeon is married to American writer and director David Mamet, whom she met while appearing in his play Speed-the-Plow at the National Theatre, London. Pidgeon and Mamet have two children, actress Clara and Noah, in addition to Mamet's two older children, Willa and Zosia.

Pidgeon, who was born to a non-practising Christian family, is a student of yoga as taught by B.K.S. Iyengar.

She holds dual American/British citizenship.

== Discography ==
- The Raven (Chesky, 1994)
- The New York Girls' Club (Chesky, 1996)
- The Four Marys (Chesky, 1998)
- Tough on Crime (Fuel 2000, 2005)
- Behind the Velvet Curtain (Great American Music, 2008)
- Slingshot (Toy Canteen, 2011)
- Blue Dress On (Toy Canteen, 2013)
- Bad Poetry (Toy Canteen, 2014)
- Sudden Exposure to Light/Comfort (Toy Canteen, 2019)
- Parts of Speech Pieces of Sound (Toy Canteen, 2022)
- Songs of LA (2024)

With Ruby Blue

- Glances Askances (Red Flame, 1987)
- Down from Above (Fontana, 1990)
- Broken Water (Red Flame 1992)
- Remasters (Universal 2011)

As guest

- Luciana Souza, Tide (Verve, 2009)
- Madeleine Peyroux, Bare Bones (Rounder, 2009)
- Chris Connelly, Decibels from Heart (Cleopatra, 2015)

== Filmography ==
=== Film ===
Year	Title	Role	Notes
1988	The Dawning	Nancy Gulliver	
1991	Uncle Vanya	Sonya	
1991	Homicide	Miss Klein	
1997	The Spanish Prisoner	Susan Ricci	
1999	The Winslow Boy	Catherine Winslow	
2000	Catastrophe	The Director's Assistant	
2000	State and Main	Ann	
2001	Heist	Fran Moore	
2002	Advice and Dissent	Ellen Goldman	
2005	Shopgirl	Christie Richards	
2005	Edmond	Wife	
2006	Provoked	Miriam Taylor	
2007	Jesse Stone: Sea Change	Leeann Lewis	
2008	Redbelt	Zena Frank	
2008	How to Be	Mother	
2008	Cat City	Victoria Compton	
2009	The Lodger	Dr. Jessica Westmin	
2010	Red	Cynthia Wilkes	
2010	Two Painters	Announcer	Short
2013	Come Back to Sorrento		
2014	Two-Bit Waltz	Anita	
2016	Allegiant	Sarah	
2018	Bird Box	Lydia	
TBA	Speed-the-Plow	Georgia Cornchuk-Stein	Post-production

=== Television ===
Year	Title	Role	Notes
1987	Bust	Sarah	2 episodes
1988	Campaign	Sally Byfleet	
1989	Screen One: She's Been Away	Young Lillian	Episode: "She's Been Away"
1992	The Water Engine	Connie	TV movie
2004–2005	The Shield	Joanna Faulks	3 episodes
2006	In Justice	Charlotte Conti	3 episodes
2006–2009	The Unit	Charlotte Ryan	14 episodes
2007	Jesse Stone: Sea Change	Leeann Lewis	TV movie
2010	Glenn Martin, DDS	Unknown	Episode: "Jackie of All Trades"; Voice
2013	Phil Spector	Dr. Fallon	TV movie
2026	Euphoria	Ms. Penzler	4 episodes
