= Ruby Blue =

Ruby Blue may refer to:

- Ruby Blue (band), a Scottish folk pop band
- Ruby Blue (album), a 2005 album by Róisín Murphy, or the title song
- Ruby Blue (film), a 2008 British drama film
