= Clara Mamet =

American actress and writer (born 1994)

- Born: September 29, 1994 (age 31); Randolph, Vermont, U.S.
- Occupations: Actress, writer
- Parent(s): David Mamet; Rebecca Pidgeon
- Relatives: Zosia Mamet (half-sister)

Clara Mamet (born September 29, 1994) is an American actress and musician best known for her role as Amber Weaver in the ABC television comedy The Neighbors.

== Early life ==
Mamet was born in Randolph, Vermont, the daughter of playwright David Mamet and actress Rebecca Pidgeon, and is the half-sister of actress Zosia Mamet. She has another half-sister, Willa Mamet, and a brother, Noah Mamet. Her father was born to a Jewish family and her mother converted to Judaism.

== Career ==
Mamet became legally emancipated at 15 so she could leave high school at 16 to pursue her career to become a playwright and actress. She started auditioning for acting parts when she was 14, but "nobody had ever hired me before. So I thought I'd hire myself" by writing roles. Mamet wrote, directed and starred in her first film, Two-Bit Waltz (2014), a semi-autobiographical movie with William H. Macy, her mother Rebecca Pidgeon, and Jared Gilman. Mamet has also written plays, Paris and The Solvit Kids, the latter co-written with Jack Quaid.

In 2012, along with her half-sister Zosia Mamet, she launched a folk music duo project called The Cabin Sisters. In April, they both played live in The Bowery Electric in New York City. In 2013, The Cabin Sisters launched a Kickstarter to fund the shooting of their first music video for their song, "Bleak Love". The campaign was unsuccessful and ended on June 9th, raising only $2,783 out of their requested budget of $32,000.

In September 2015, it was revealed Mamet had been cast in Neighbors 2: Sorority Rising.

== Filmography ==
=== Film ===
Year	Title	Role	Notes
2004	Spartan	Billy's Daughter	
2010	The Marquee	The Girl	Short film
2010	Inside the Actor's Workshop	The Paint Girl	Short film
2010	Our Valley	The Girl	Short film
2013	Night Moves	Activist Filmmaker	
2014	Two-Bit Waltz	Maude	Also director and writer
2014	Spirit Blossom	Sandalwood	Short film
2016	Wiener-Dog	Lina	
2016	Neighbors 2: Sorority Rising	Maranda	
2016	Satanic	Elise	
2018	Benjamin	Amber	
2020	Sloan Hearts Neckface	Sloan	

=== Television ===
Year	Title	Role	Notes
2006	The Unit	C.J Weiss	1 episode
2012–2014	The Neighbors	Amber Weaver	44 episodes
2013	Phil Spector	Back to Mono Girl	Television film
2015	Wacko Smacko	April	1 episode
2016–2017	Son of Zorn	Layla	5 episodes

== Works or publications ==
- Mamet, Clara. Paris. New York: Samuel French, 2012. ISBN 978-0-573-70068-2
- Mamet, Clara, and Jack Quaid. The Solvit Kids. New York: Samuel French, 2012. ISBN 978-0-573-70087-3
