= Satanic (2016 film) =

2016 film by Jeffrey Hunt

- Theatrical release poster
- Directed by: Jeffrey Hunt
- Written by: Anthony Jaswinski
- Produced by: Lawrence Mattis; Michael Moran
- Starring: Sarah Hyland; Steven Krueger; Justin Chon; Clara Mamet; Sophie Dalah; Anthony Carrigan
- Cinematography: Mike Karasick
- Edited by: JoAnne Yarrow
- Music by: Jim Dooley; Todd Haberman
- Production companies: MarVista Entertainment; Circle of Confusion Productions
- Distributed by: Magnet Releasing
- Release date: July 1, 2016 (United States)
- Running time: 85 minutes
- Country: United States
- Language: English
- Box office: $349,183

Satanic is a 2016 American horror film, directed by Jeffrey Hunt, from a screenplay by Anthony Jaswinski. It stars Sarah Hyland, Steven Krueger, Justin Chon, Clara Mamet, Sophie Dalah and Anthony Carrigan.

The film was released in a limited release and through video on demand on July 1, 2016, by Magnet Releasing.

== Plot ==
The film begins with a scared female making her way through a labyrinth of pentagram-covered walls, hearing voices, trembling with fear. A figure runs past her.

A group of teenagers arrives in Los Angeles to visit several occult sites. Seth and Elise are goths and Chloe and David their friends. As they pass an abandoned building they see and photograph an unknown figure inside who is panicking.

The group registers at the Flower Hotel, where a Satanic priestess committed suicide in room 204 in 1972. During a Ouija board session, Elise claims she feels something. The group visits the Los Angeles Chapter of the Church of Satan, where patrons spit on them when they ask questions. They next visit a residence in the Hollywood Hills where Charles Manson and his followers murdered several people in 1969 including actress Sharon Tate. At the Black Door Shop, an occult and Satanic goods store, the owner asks them to leave when Seth sees a Satanic altar in the back room. The group spends the rest of the day in Venice, California. Upset about being evicted, the group decides to follow the shop owner. He enters a house and joins a Satanic ritual. A girl, later identified as Alice, appears to be an intended sacrifice. Chloe screams and the group flees to their hotel. Seth loses his phone in the commotion. The next day Alice calls them on Seth's phone.

They meet Alice and take her back to the hotel. She recognizes the room as the site of the suicide. They perform a ritual. Alice draws a pentagram on the wall, vomits and undresses, revealing scars from brands and cut marks. Then she slashes her own throat. The group reports the incident to the police and relocates to David's home. Elise uses the Ouija board to determine why Alice killed herself. David is alarmed when he discovers a pentagram drawn in condensation on a bathroom window. The group discovers the kitchen dirty, cutlery stuck in the ceiling and dead birds in the swimming pool. They return to the Black Door Shop and David aggressively interrogates the owner. The owner says they were not going to sacrifice Alice, they were expelling her from the group for being too extreme.

The group decides to leave Los Angeles. Elise suddenly feels unwell. Chloe discovers marks on Elise's belly. Elise goes into a restroom. She screams. Only her torn clothing remains and the stall is covered in scratches.

Seth enters an abandoned building when he hears Elise screaming. Chloe and David hear Seth screaming. They find three bloody marks on a pillar, then four marks carved on David's face. As he and Chloe flee the building, David vanishes. Terrorized, Chloe stumbles through a maze of sheets covered with pentagrams. She reaches a window and tries to get the attention of a passing car. The inhabitants of the car are Chloe, David, Seth and Elise, who take pictures and leave.

Chloe is unable to escape the building. She finds herself in a small dark room with scratches on the walls. Suddenly her mouth has been stitched shut and her arms have been amputated. The Devil picks up her phone and approaches her. The stitches prevent her from screaming.

== Cast ==
- Sarah Hyland as Chloe
- Steven Krueger as David
- Justin Chon as Seth
- Clara Mamet as Elise
- Sophie Dalah as Alice
- Anthony Carrigan as Anthony
- Marc Barnes as James the Hotel Clerk

== Production ==
In August 2014, it was announced Jeffrey Hunt would direct the film, from a screenplay by Anthony Jaswinski. Lawrence Mattis will serve as a producer on the film, while Stephen Emery will serve as an executive producer, under his Circle of Confusion Productions banner. Magnet Releasing will distribute the film.

== Release ==
The film was given a limited theatrical release and was distributed through video on demand on July 1, 2016.

=== Critical reception ===
Satanic received negative reviews from film critics. It holds an approval rating of 0% based on 7 reviews, with a weighted average of 3.6/10.
