= Caroline Correa =

Brazilian actress

- Born: Caroline de Souza Corrêa; 19 May 1979 (age 47); Umuarama, Paraná, Brazil
- Occupation: Actress
- Years active: 2004–present
- Spouse: Aladdin Ishmael (m. 2008)

Caroline de Souza Corrêa (born 19 May 1979) is a Brazilian actress and model.

== Biography ==
Correa was born in Umuarama, Brazil. After a brief stint in London, she moved to Sydney, Australia at age 20, where she lived for five years. She then moved to Los Angeles, United States, where she pursued her acting career.

== Career ==
Caroline made her first film debut in the Australian movie, Go Big, which starred Justine Clarke, Tom Long, Alex Dimitriades, and Kimberley Joseph. A year later, she appeared in Star Wars: Episode III – Revenge of the Sith, during the year she took a role as Henry's date in the film Stealth. In 2006, she starred in The Fast and the Furious: Tokyo Drift of film series. Correa has recently appeared on Redbelt, and is currently working on Deep in the Valley. She features on the Magnum ice-cream ad alongside Benicio Del Toro.

== Personal life ==
On 22 February 2008, Caroline married the Arab photographer Aladdin Ishmael at a ceremony that took place in Florianópolis, Brazil.

== Filmography ==
Year	Title	Role	Notes
2004	Go Big	Lar's Princess	Television
2005	Stealth	Henry's Date	
2005	Star Wars: Episode III – Revenge of the Sith	Bail Organa's Aide #1 (Sheltay Retrac)	Uncredited
2006	The Fast and the Furious: Tokyo Drift	Sexy Brazilian Model	
2008	Deep in the Valley	Andi	
2008	Redbelt	Monica	
2014	Silicon Valley		Episode: "Fiduciary Duties"
2015	Togetherness		Episode: "Ghost in Chains"; Episode: "Insanity"; Episode: "Handcuffs"
