= Monica Pidgeon =

British interior designer and writer

- Born: Monica Lehmann; 29 September 1913; Catemu, Chile
- Died: 17 September 2009 (aged 95)
- Education: University College London
- Occupations: Editor, writer
- Spouse: Raymond Pidgeon
- Children: 2
- Relatives: Olga Lehmann (sister); Andrew George Lehmann (brother); Rebecca Pidgeon (granddaughter)
- Writing career
- Subject: Architecture

Monica Pidgeon (29 September 1913 – 17 September 2009) was a British interior designer and architectural writer best known as the editor of Architectural Design from 1946 to 1975.

== Early life ==
Pidgeon was born Monica Lehmann in 1913 in Catemu, Chile. Her father was a French mining engineer; her mother was Scottish. In 1929, her parents moved the family to London so their children could finish their education at English schools; she attended St Martin-in-the-Fields High School for Girls in Lambeth. After graduating, she enrolled in a two-year interior design course at The Bartlett School of Architecture at University College London (UCL). She had initially tried to study architecture but Albert Richardson, the head of the Bartlett school at the time, did not believe women belonged in architecture and her father convinced her to focus on interior design instead.

== Career ==
After graduating from UCL, Pidgeon worked for a furniture company in Bedford. When the business closed, she began working as a freelance writer and illustrator. In 1941, she joined the staff of Architectural Design as the assistant to its editor, Tony Towndrow. When Towndrow moved to Australia in 1946, Pidgeon was promoted to editor. The magazine's owners, who believed a female editor would not appeal to readers and advertisers and were adverse to the idea themselves, mandated that male architects' names be included on the masthead as "consultants". Apart from a few book reviews written early in her tenure at Architectural Design, Pidgeon's own writing featured in the magazine only rarely.

Under Pidgeon, Architectural Design featured well-known and little-known architects, showcased post-war reconstructive architecture, and promoted sustainable design. Pidgeon also avoided criticism: she believed that it was better not to write anything about poor designs and buildings than to publish critical reviews. Standard Catalogue Company, who owned the magazine, intended to cease production of the magazine in the late 1960s, but Pidgeon convinced them to continue publication using only the revenue earned from subscriptions instead of advertising. She left Architectural Design in 1975 to take up a position as editor of the RIBA Journal, and stayed there until Peter Murray took over in 1979.

Pidgeon was an extraordinary photographer whose black and white photographs were prominently featured in the 2018 exhibition entitled Eternal City: Rome in the Photographs Collection of the Royal Institute of British Architects. Organized by the Polo Museo del Lazio, RIBA, and the British School in Rome, the exhibition was held at the Museo Vittoriano in Rome's Monument to Vittorio Emmanuele II from June to October 2018. Pidgeon's photograph of four, young stylish Italian men walking away from the colonnade and piazza of St. Peter's Church was the centerpiece of the exhibition's marketing literature. Her eye and capability for architectural photography compared to the skill of fellow photographers featured in the exhibit. Most of Pidgeon's photography that was presented occurred in 1961. Pidgeon's architectural photography bravely integrated the lives of Italian people from young children to seniors, many of them female, as cultural icons living within the greatest architecture of the Western world.

Pidgeon retired in 1979. She established Pidgeon Audio Visual, a collection of materials featuring architects and designers discussing their work, to be shown at architectural schools. She continued compiling recordings for the collection until her late eighties.

National Life Stories conducted an oral history interview (C467/39) with Monica Pigeon in 1999 for its Architects Lives' collection held by the British Library.

== Honours ==
Pidgeon joined the Royal Institute of British Architects as an honorary fellow in 1970 and was made an honorary fellow of the Architectural Association in 1979. For her work on the Pidgeon Audio Visual project, she was made an honorary fellow of the American Institute of Architects in 1987.

== Family ==
Pidgeon's sister, Olga Lehmann, was a visual artist, while her brother, Andrew George Lehmann, was a literary critic. She married Raymond Pidgeon, whom she met as a student at University College London, in 1936; they had a daughter named Annabel and son named Carl, and divorced in 1946. Her granddaughter is Rebecca Pidgeon, an actress and singer.
