= Workshy (album) =

Studio album by Animals That Swim
- Released: 1994
- Recorded: 1993, London
- Genre: Alternative
- Label: Elemental
- Producer: Dare Mason

Animals That Swim chronology
Workshy (1994)	I Was the King, I Really Was the King (1996)

Workshy is the debut full-length album by British alternative rock band Animals That Swim, released on Elemental Records in the UK in 1994 and on big PoP Records in the US in 1996. The NME placed Workshy at number 15 in its year-end list of the Top 50 Albums of 1994.

== History ==
Workshy was recorded for "around £3,000" in a studio in Fulham, southwest London, with recording sessions lasting about 17 days. The album was produced by Dare Mason, a producer/engineer/mixer and multi-instrumentalist whose credits also include Placebo (band), Boy George, Cinerama, The Church (band) and Marty Willson-Piper (with whom Mason currently records as Noctorum (band)). Animals That Swim and Mason were friends, as Mason was the ex-husband of bandmember Hank Starrs' wife. The band had first recorded with Mason in 1992: While working on a recording project at Townhouse 3, a state-of-the-art studio that was part of Townhouse Studios in London, Mason had let the band sneak in one weekend to record their first single “King Beer”. A different, re-recorded version of this song appears on Workshy because the original master tapes for the single version were lost when the factory that pressed the vinyl copies of the single closed down.

The band signed a recording deal with the Elemental label to make Workshy, their first full-length release, following two singles (“King Beer”, “Roy”) on their own Beachheads In Space label and a 10” EP (“50 Dresses”) for the short-lived Che Records label. Lead vocals on the album are shared by brothers Hank Starrs and Hugh Barker.

== Critical reception ==
The album received largely positive critical reviews upon its release and remains a cult favorite today. The New Musical Express (NME) placed Workshy at number 15 in its Top 50 Albums of 1994, landing it above albums by Jeff Buckley, Pulp, Primal Scream, Pearl Jam, Beck and Morrissey. In a 5-star review in Record Collector magazine upon its reissue, Tim Peacock wrote, “Divorced from the hubris of the times, Workshy has grown in stature.” Danny Eccleston, writing for Mojo (magazine), described the music on Workshy as “literate, trumpet-assisted indie-pop for the left brain" and "shaggy-dog songs that concerned fleeting alco-epiphanies and dying pensioners." He added, "When Starrs wrote a love song ('Madame Yevonde'), it would be to an obscure photography pioneer of the 20s and 30s.” Allmusic noted the album's “individuality in a rock world that had gone Nirvana-mad on one hand and incipiently Britpop on the other.”

== Reissue ==
Workshy was remastered and reissued on limited edition deluxe vinyl in 2016 and deluxe CD in 2017, both via Elemental/One Little Indian. These versions contain nine bonus tracks, two of which are rare, albeit previously released, b-sides, while the other seven are demos for songs that were never previously released. Most of these, according to the liner notes, were recorded in between the band's second album (I Was the King, I Really Was the King) and third (and final) album (Happiness From a Distant Star).

== Personnel ==
- Hank Starrs
- Hugh Barker
- Del Crabtree
- Al Barker
- Anthony Coote
- Produced by Dare Mason and Hugh Barker

== Release history ==
Region	Date	Format	Label	Catalogue No.
UK	1994	LP; CD	Elemental Records	ELM24; ELM24CD
US	1996	CD	big PoP Ltd	bP 0510-2
UK	2016	LP	Elemental Records/One Little Indian	ELM24LTD
UK	2017	CD	Elemental Records/One Little Indian	ELM24CDLTD
