= Son of Zorn =

2016 American sitcom

- Genre: Sitcom
- Created by: Reed Agnew; Eli Jorné
- Starring: Cheryl Hines; Johnny Pemberton; Tim Meadows; Artemis Pebdani; Ellen Wong
- Voices of: Jason Sudeikis
- Composer: Leo Birenberg
- Country of origin: United States
- Original language: English
- No. of seasons: 1
- No. of episodes: 13

Production
- Executive producers: Phil Lord; Christopher Miller; Seth Cohen; Reed Agnew; Eli Jorné; Eric Appel; Sally Bradford McKenna
- Producer: Maria Melograne
- Cinematography: Michael A. Price
- Editor: Katie Abel
- Camera setup: Single-camera
- Running time: 22 minutes
- Production companies: Agnew Jorné Productions (2016); Lord Miller Productions; 20th Century Fox Television

Original release
- Network: Fox
- Release: September 11, 2016 – February 19, 2017

Son of Zorn is an American sitcom that uses a hybrid of live action and animation, parodying Masters of the Universe. It was created by Reed Agnew and Eli Jorné for Fox. The series stars Cheryl Hines, Johnny Pemberton, Tim Meadows, Artemis Pebdani, and Jason Sudeikis as the voice of Zorn. Son of Zorn is a joint production by Agnew Jorné Productions, Lord Miller Productions, and 20th Century Fox Television. The series ran from September 11, 2016, to February 19, 2017.

== Premise ==
The series takes place in an alternate world where traditional animated characters co-exist with real-world humans. Zorn is a barbarian warrior from the fictional island of Zephyria who moves to Orange County, California, to reconnect with his ex-wife and teenage son Alangulon, "Alan" for short.

Within the show, Zorn and things native to Zephyria are animated, following the style of He-Man and the Masters of the Universe, while the rest of the world is live-action. The series' opening title cards are rendered in the style of fantasy cartoons of the 1980s such as He-Man and ThunderCats.

== Cast ==
- Jason Sudeikis as the voice of Zorn, a barbarian warrior from the South Pacific fantasy island Zephyria of which he is the defender since 1971. He is Alan's father and Edie's ex-husband. As Zephyria's defender, Zorn and his allies defended it from threats that have included but are not limited to Glombeasts, Lava Monsters, vampires, and liberal Media. In Orange County, he gets a job in phone sales at Sanitation Solutions. Zorn is also a parody of He-Man.
  - Dan Lippert as Zorn's live action stand-in, whose performance is replaced by animation.
- Cheryl Hines as Edie Bennett, Zorn's ex-wife and Alan's mother.
- Johnny Pemberton as Alangulon "Alan" Bennett, the titular character who is the vegetarian half-Zephyrian son of Zorn and Edie.
- Tim Meadows as Craig Ross, Edie's fiancé and an online college professor and psychologist.
- Artemis Pebdani as Linda Orvend, Zorn's boss at Sanitation Solutions in Orange County. Linda is later demoted by Blake Erickson, although she returns to her original position in the series finale following Todd's resignation.
- Ellen Wong as Nancy. She is the crush of Alan and is a waitress at a restaurant. Nancy is Cambodian American.

=== Recurring cast ===
- Mark Proksch as Todd McDonald, Zorn's co-worker at Sanitation Solutions.
- Tony Revolori as Scott Schmidt, Alan's best friend.
- Clara Mamet as Layla Green, Alan's love interest.
- Rob Riggle as the voice of Headbutt Man, a hard-headed ally of Zorn from Zephyria. Headbutt Man has a daughter named Headbutt Girl and has previously lost his wife and son to the Zephyrian monsters that he and the rest of Zorn's allies fight. He is a parody of Ram Man.
- Nick Offerman as the voice of Dr. Klorpins, a furry goblin-like creature from the western part of Zephyria who is Zorn's doctor.
- François Chau as Nancy's father. He is from Cambodia.

== Production ==
The show was created by Reed Agnew and Eli Jorné, who wrote the pilot episode, while Eric Appel directed. Initially Agnew and Jorne were set to be co-showrunners, however after Fox ordered the series to air Agnew backed out and was made co-executive producer instead. At this point, Sally McKenna was brought in to replace Agnew; McKenna would later, in April 2016, become the sole showrunner after Jorne also left the project.

Artemis Pebdani and Tim Meadows' casting was announced in July 2015, with Jason Sudeikis, Cheryl Hines, and Johnny Pemberton's involvement announced the following November.

=== Cancellation ===
On May 11, 2017, the series was cancelled after one season, ending the series on a cliffhanger.

== Episodes ==
No.	Title	Directed by	Written by	Original release date	Prod. code	U.S. viewers (millions)
1	"Return to Orange County"	Eric Appel	Reed Agnew & Eli Jorné	September 11, 2016	1AYA01	6.13
Zorn is a warrior and defender of the South Pacific Island of Zephyria. Following a recent battle against his enemies, Zorn travels to California to reconnect with his son Alangulon (aka "Alan") and discovers that his ex-wife Edie is engaged. Upon realizing Alan hates him for being mostly absent from his life, Zorn decides not to return to Zephyria and gets a job in town at Sanitation Solutions. Guest starring: Lori Alan as the voice of Laseron, Jess Harnell as the voice of Skunk Man, Tony Revolori as Scott, Rob Riggle as the voice of Headbutt Man
2	"Defender of Teen Love"	Eric Appel	Eli Jorné	September 25, 2016	1AYA02	2.65
Zorn uses the Stone of Sight to help Alan get close to his crush, Nancy. Even though Alan sees this as stalking, he can't help but work it to his advantage. Meanwhile, Edie pushes Zorn to move his boxes out of her garage and into his apartment. Guest starring: Alice Lee as Nancy, Mark Proksch as Todd, Tony Revolori as Scott, Horatio Sanz as Uber Driver
3	"The War of the Workplace"	Eric Appel	Monica Padrick	October 2, 2016	1AYA04	3.64
When someone steals hot sauce from Sanitation Solutions' break room, Zorn attempts to fight back with his co-workers in his own style of fighting. Meanwhile, Alan tries to get out of a swimming session in gym class for fear of exposing his secret, while getting bullied by a student named Warren. In the process, Alan learns something about himself that he never knew. Guest starring: Bryce Johnson as Derek, Bobby Lee as Jakton, Noah Munck as Warren
4	"The Weekend Warrior"	Payman Benz	Elijah Aron & Jordan Young	October 16, 2016	1AYA03	3.78
Zorn tries to be a "cool dad" when Alan spends the weekend with him, but things take an unexpected turn when Alan's friend Jeff shows up. Guest starring: Nyima Funk as Shirley, Cameron Monaghan as Jeff, Mark Proksch as Todd, Tony Revolori as Scott, Cedric Yarbrough as Bill
5	"A Taste of Zephyria"	Bill Benz	Dan Mintz	October 23, 2016	1AYA05	2.27
Zorn tries to teach Alan about his Zephyrian culture. Meanwhile, Edie goes to war with her new neighbors over their talking garden gnome. Guest starring: Jess Harnell as the voice of the Animal Pelts, Clara Mamet as Layla, Nate Mooney as Frank, Mark Proksch as Todd, Tony Revolori as Scott
6	"A Tale of Two Zorns"	Eric Appel	Greg Gallant	November 6, 2016	1AYA08	2.08
After seeing Alan and Craig bond over their favorite video game, Zorn uses his body double dummy "Mecha-Zorn" to sneak out of work and wait in line with Alan for the latest game in the series. Meanwhile, Edie and Linda use "Mecha-Zorn" to let out their frustrations with the real Zorn. Guest starring: Beth Dover as Bridget, Mark Proksch as Todd
7	"The Battle of Thanksgiving"	Payman Benz	Jon Kern	November 13, 2016	1AYA07	3.64
Following a pep talk with Linda, Zorn crashes Edie's Thanksgiving dinner to prove to her mother that he's matured, only to hear her views on Zephyria. Meanwhile, Alan tries to butter up his grandmother so she'll pay for his summer music camp. Guest starring: Sarah Koenig as Narrator, Nick Offerman as the voice of Dr. Klorpnis
8	"Return of the Drinking Buddy"	Eric Appel	Reed Agnew	December 4, 2016	1AYA06	3.12
Zorn's old friend Headbutt Man is visiting from Zephyria, except that he's now sober and dating Edie's former co-worker, Elizabeth. Meanwhile, Alan is invited to a party being attended by his crush Layla, where he has to bring Headbutt Man's daughter, Headbutt Girl. Guest starring: Jillian Bell as the voice of Dorothy Clementina / Headbutt Girl, Alex Borstein as Elizabeth, Brian Huskey as Josh, Clara Mamet as Layla, Mark Proksch as Todd, Rob Riggle as the voice of Headbutt Man
9	"The War on Grafelnik"	Eric Appel	Kevin Etten	December 11, 2016	1AYA09	2.88
Torn between celebrating Edie's Christmas and Zorn's Grafelnik, the Zephyrian holiday of revenge, Alan discovers he can use both holidays to pit his parents against each other and get better presents. Meanwhile, Craig works to face his fear of Santa Claus. Guest starring: Mark Proksch as Todd, Tony Revolori as Scott
10	"Radioactive Ex-Girlfriend"	Bill Benz	Amelie Gillette	January 8, 2017	1AYA10	4.26
Edie and Craig are having an engagement party, which they invite Zorn and Linda to. In need of a plus one, Zorn calls his radioactive ex-girlfriend from Zephyria, Radiana, to be his plus one and tries to keep her calm to avoid a radioactive meltdown. While worried about Alan's musical glass performance, which he is going to do in front of everyone (including Layla), Edie has been noticing that Zorn making out with Radiana has been having some radioactive side effects on him. Guest starring: Clara Mamet as Layla, Olivia Wilde as the voice of Radiana
11	"The Battle of Self-Acceptance"	Bill Benz	Elijah Aron & Jordan Young	January 22, 2017	1AYA11	2.00
To go swimming with Layla, Alan takes a drug that changes animated Zephyrian bodies into live-action. But when the free sample runs out, withdrawal turns him completely animated. Craig trains with Zorn, hoping to provide everything Edie needs. Sanitation Solutions' CEO Blake Erickson demotes Linda, replacing her with a sycophantic Todd. Zorn realizes that Linda, no longer his boss, is a woman. Edie and Zorn share a tender moment when he sensitively helps Alan accept himself; Alan reveals his real legs to Layla, who accepts him with a kiss, while Craig leaves Edie and encourages her to be with Zorn. Edie goes to Zorn's apartment, and finds him in bed with Linda. Guest starring: John Marshall Jones as Blake Erickson, Clara Mamet as Layla, Nick Offerman as the voice of Dr. Klorpnis, Mark Proksch as Todd, Gary Anthony Williams as the voices of Reverend and Sir Pent
12	"The Quest for Craig"	Jared Hess	Mark Stegemann & Matt Roller	February 12, 2017	1AYA12	1.40
Craig has not been in contact with Edie for days, following Alan's Zephyrian drug incident. Edie enlists Zorn and Linda to help find him. Meanwhile, Alan allows his animated legs to be shown in front of his classmates, who are impressed with them. Alan's powerful animated legs lead to the football coach asking Alan to join the football team when his lead kicker gets deported. Guest starring: Pete Gardner as Football Coach, Tymberlee Hill as Diane, Clara Mamet as Layla, Isiah Whitlock Jr. as Robert
13	"All Hail Son of Zorn"	Claire Scanlon	Reed Agnew	February 19, 2017	1AYA13	1.58
Edie and Craig get ready for their wedding. Zorn is determined to show his commitment to living in Orange County by selling off all of his Zephyrian weapons at a yard sale, despite his Zephyrian allies wanting him to return to help fight off Lord Vulchazor's forces. As Layla doesn't want to talk to Alan after he ditched her for the football team, he receives help from Zorn in order to find a way to get back together with her. At the same time, Linda works to impress CEO Blake Erickson enough for her to get her old position at Sanitation Solutions back, after Todd resigns. After getting back together with Layla on prom night, Alan finds out that he is pregnant due to his Zephyrian heritage. In the final scene, Zorn gets captured by Lord Vulchazor's forces and ends up on a freighter ship sailing toward Zephyria, where Lord Vulchazor is unaware that the Staff of Quiv which he is looking for has been sold at Zorn's yard sale. Guest starring: Fred Armisen as the voice of Lord Vulchazor, Jess Harnell as the voices of Demon Spirits and Mudman, Keegan-Michael Key as the voice of Gobos the Great, Clara Mamet as Layla, Mark Proksch as Todd, Lakshmi Singh as herself, Giorgia Whigham as Shannon

== Reception ==
Son of Zorn received mixed reviews from critics. On Rotten Tomatoes, the series holds a 58% approval rating based on 38 critics, and a 6.3/10 rating. The critical consensus reads: "Son of Zorn earns points for originality, a talented cast, and intermittent laughs, but they aren't quite enough to prop up a gimmick that's still in search of a workable premise for an ongoing series." On Metacritic, the show holds a score of 57 out of 100 based on 19 critical reviews, indicating "mixed or average reviews".
