= Jeffrey Hunt =

American camera operator and director

- Born: Jeffrey Glen Hunt; Tulsa, Oklahoma, U.S.
- Occupations: Camera operator, director
- Years active: 1993–present

Jeffrey Glen Hunt is an American camera operator and director. He directed for television programs including Fringe, CSI: Crime Scene Investigation, The Vampire Diaries, Hawaii Five-O, The Originals (and its spin-off Legacies), Person of Interest, CSI: NY and The Whole Truth.

In 2016, Hunt made his directorial debut with the horror film Satanic, starring Sarah Hyland. In 2018, The Ankler reported that his home in Malibu, California burned down in the Woolsey Fire, In 2019, he directed the crime drama film Saving Zoë, starring Laura Marano and Vanessa Marano.
