= Down from Above =

1990 album by Ruby Blue

Studio album by Ruby Blue
- Released: 6 August 1990
- Length: 42:04
- Label: Fontana
- Producer: Tony Phillips; Ruby Blue

Ruby Blue chronology
Glances Askances (1987)	Down from Above (1990)	Almost Naked (1993)

Down from Above is the second studio album by Scottish folk pop band Ruby Blue, released by Fontana Records on 6 August 1990.

== Background ==
Singer Rebecca Pidgeon and guitarist Roger Fife formed Ruby Blue as a duo in 1986 and released their debut album Glances Askances on the independent Red Flame label in 1987. Shortly after its release, multi-instrumentalist Anthony Coote and drummer Robert Peters joined the band. They released the singles "Because" in March 1988 and "Bloomsbury Blue" in November 1988, with the latter being recorded as a trio after the departure of Peters. Pidgeon then invited Erika Spotswood to join as a backing vocalist and the new line-up released the single "Stand Together" in February 1989.

In early 1989, the band signed to Phonogram Records and recorded the album Down from Above that summer. Prior to the album's release on 6 August 1990, the singles "The Quiet Mind" and "Primitive Man" were released on 16 April 1990 and 18 June 1990 respectively. A third and final single, "Can It Be", was released on 17 September 1990. The album and its three singles failed to crack the top 100 of the UK charts. Both Pidgeon and Coote left the band at the end of 1990, with Pidgeon deciding to pursue her acting career. Spotswood and Fife continued working together as Ruby Blue, releasing the album Almost Naked in 1993 before disbanding.

American playwright David Mamet wrote the lyrics to "Primitive Man" and "Epitaph". Pidgeon was introduced to Mamet in 1989 after landing a stage role in his play Speed-the-Plow at the National Theatre, London. The pair later married. Pidgeon recalled about "Primitive Man": "He [Mamet] sent me this poem, which he described as a 'country song about murder, love and marriage' and told me to put country music to it."

== Critical reception ==
Professional ratings
Review scores
Source	Rating
NME	5/10
Record Mirror	4.5/5 stars

Upon its release, Music Week picked Down from Above as their "album of the week", with reviewer Gareth Thompson praising it for being "decorative without over-elaboration" and containing a "crafted pop sensibility that should keep Ruby Blue on course for major success in the Nineties". Peter Stanton of Record Mirror called it "excellent" and noted that the "sweet vocals of Pidgeon and the relaxing harmonies of Spotswood [are never] shown in greater splendour than on the slushy tunes". He also praised Pidgeon's lyrics for "instill[ing] a lot of meaning into the tunes" and called both "Primitive Man" and "The Quiet Mind" "gorgeous". Helen M. Jerome, writing for The Independent, summarised, "Ruby Blue seem to have all the qualifications to make the Anglo-American big time. Slightly folky at the edges, this kind of album gets under your skin."

In a mixed review, Martin Day of the NME picked "Primitive Man" and "The Quiet Mind" as the album's highlights, but thought that the "album as a whole fails to impress" as the band "pitch themselves halfway" between rock and "raggle taggle charabanc". He described it as "not 'authentic' acoustic rock, but, at its worst, All About Eve without the Goth gloom". Paul Lester of Melody Maker felt the band were "still caught mid-leap between unrealised potential and promise fulfilled" as the album "cover[s] too many bases with too little expertise, suffering from indecision and an ignorance of their own strengths". He noted that their "disorientation often leads them to plump for shameless mimicry in the vain hope that it will give them direction", resulting in an album "suffer[ing] from a surfeit of dehydrated folk". He picked "Song of the Mermaid" as an example of where "Ruby Blue are [at their] best [by] being themselves, and sounding like no one else".

== Track listing ==
No.	Title	Writer(s)	Length
1.	"Primitive Man"	Rebecca Pidgeon, Anthony Coote, David Mamet	4:28
2.	"The Quiet Mind – For Joe"	Pidgeon	3:07
3.	"Take Your Money"	Pidgeon, Roger Fife	2:51
4.	"Can It Be"	Pidgeon	3:20
5.	"Away from Here"	Pidgeon	3:20
6.	"Pavan"	Pidgeon, Coote	0:41
7.	"Stand Together"	Pidgeon	3:38
8.	"Betty's Last Letter"	Pidgeon, Fife	2:42
9.	"Bloomsbury Blue"	Pidgeon, Fife, Malcolm McKay	3:35
10.	"Midnight Road"	Pidgeon	3:32
11.	"Not Alone"	Pidgeon, Coote	3:49
12.	"Song of the Mermaid (To Mr Levy the Sailor)"	Pidgeon	2:40
13.	"Something's Gone Wrong"	Pidgeon, Fife	3:42
14.	"Epitaph"	Pidgeon, Mamet	0:39

== Personnel ==
Ruby Blue

- Rebecca Pidgeon – lead vocals (1–5, 7–13), backing vocals (1–5, 7–13), keyboards (1, 13), acoustic guitar (2, 14), vocals (6, 14)
- Roger Fife – electric guitar (1, 3–5, 7, 9–13), vocals (2, 6–7, 11), dobro guitar (13), backing vocals (13), harmony vocals (13)
- Anthony Coote – 12-string acoustic guitar (1–3, 7, 10), mandolin (1, 3, 7, 12), electric bass (1, 3, 5, 7, 9–11), vocals (1–7, 9, 11, 13), dobro guitar (2, 7, 10), keyboards (2, 4, 5, 7, 12, 13), acoustic guitar (4, 5, 9, 12), electric guitar (4, 5, 8, 10), bass guitar (4, 13), acoustic bass (8), 12-string guitar (9, 11) nylon guitar (9, 12), string arrangement (9), 6-string guitar (11), solo electric guitar (13)
- Erika Spotswood – harmony vocals (1–5, 7–13), backing vocals (1–5, 7–13), vocals (6)

Additional musicians

- Chris Buck – drums (1, 3–5, 7, 10, 12, 13)
- Stephen Wickham – violin (1, 7, 12)
- Tony Phillips – keyboards (1), drum programming (2, 3, 5, 9), keyboard programming (3), sticks (9)
- Steve Ferrera – high hat (3, 9), brushed snare (9)
- Karlos Edwards – bongos (3, 4), triangle (5), shaker (5, 9), tambourine (7, 10)
- Graham Henderson – accordion (3, 9), piano (7, 8), organ (9, 10)
- Carol Starks – vocals (6)
- David Mamet – vocals (6)
- Gavyn Wright – violin (7, 10), first violin (9)
- Wilf Gibson – second violin (9)
- Garfield Jackson – viola (9)
- Martin Loveday – cello (9)

Production

- Tony Phillips – production, mixing, engineering
- Ruby Blue – production
- Dave Browne – engineering assistance
- Helen Woodward – engineering assistance

Other

- Mark Whitehouse – front cover illustration
- John Rutter – front cover photography
- The Design Clinic – design and layout
