= State and Main =

- Promotional poster
- Directed by: David Mamet
- Written by: David Mamet
- Produced by: Sarah Green
- Starring: William H. Macy; Sarah Jessica Parker; Alec Baldwin; Julia Stiles; Philip Seymour Hoffman; Rebecca Pidgeon; David Paymer; Charles Durning; Patti LuPone; Clark Gregg
- Cinematography: Oliver Stapleton
- Edited by: Barbara Tulliver
- Music by: Theodore Shapiro
- Production companies: Fine Line Features; Filmtown Entertainment; Green/Renzi; El Dorado Pictures
- Distributed by: Fine Line Features; New Line Distribution, Inc.
- Release dates: August 26, 2000 (Canada); December 22, 2000 (United States)
- Running time: 105 minutes
- Country: United States
- Language: English
- Box office: $9.2 million

State and Main is a 2000 American comedy-drama film written and directed by David Mamet about a troubled film production that relocates to a small Vermont town. The ensemble cast includes William H. Macy, Sarah Jessica Parker, Alec Baldwin, Julia Stiles, Philip Seymour Hoffman, Rebecca Pidgeon, David Paymer, Patti LuPone, Clark Gregg, and Charles Durning.

== Plot ==
Havoc is wrought on the inhabitants of a small New England town by a troubled film production. After Bob Barrenger, the leading man's penchant for underage girls gets them banished from their New Hampshire location, the crew moves to the small town of Waterford, Vermont to finish shooting The Old Mill.

As its title suggests, the film depends on the presence of a genuine mill, something the town is reported to possess. Unfortunately, with only days before principal photography begins, it becomes apparent that the mill in fact burned down decades ago. Unfazed, the film's director, Walt Price, places his faith in the ability of first-time screenwriter Joseph Turner White to alter the script. What he doesn't count on is White's apparently bottomless reserve of angst-fueled writer's block. A local bookseller, Annie Black, tries to provide White with inspiration.

The film's leading lady, Claire Wellesley, refuses to do her contracted nude scene unless she's paid an additional $800,000, while the foreign cinematographer offends the locals by messing with a historic firehouse. Meanwhile, powerful movie producer Marty Rossen comes to town to help Price with the ensuing mess. Barrenger dallies with Carla, a crafty local teen.

Everything comes to a head after Barrenger and Carla are injured in a car crash. White, the only witness, is faced with a moral dilemma over whether to reveal what he saw, while his relationship with Annie deepens.

Annie arranges a sham deposition on one of the film's sets, during which White, believing the proceeding to be genuine, falsely denies having witnessed Carla in Barrenger's car. Distraught over having perjured himself, White decides to leave Waterford. At the train station, he learns that the town's courthouse burned down in 1960 and encounters the judge arriving to conduct the actual deposition. Realizing that Annie had staged the earlier proceeding, White returns and announces his intention to testify truthfully. But before White can testify, Rossen uses the $800,000 originally intended for Wellesley to pay off prosecutor Doug Mackenzie, who drops the case. The judge leaves to play golf, while White and Annie begin a relationship and the production proceeds with the film, retitled The Fires of Home.

== Cast ==
- William H. Macy as Walt Price
- Sarah Jessica Parker as Claire Wellesley
- Alec Baldwin as Bob Barrenger
- Julia Stiles as Carla
- Philip Seymour Hoffman as Joseph Turner White
- Rebecca Pidgeon as Annie Black
- David Paymer as Marty Rossen
- Clark Gregg as Doug Mackenzie
- Patti LuPone as Sherry Bailey
- Charles Durning as Mayor George Bailey
- Lionel Mark Smith as Bill Smith
- Ricky Jay as Jack
- Michael Higgins as Doc Wilson
- Jonathan Katz as Howie Gold
- Laura Silverman as Secretary
- Michael Bradshaw as Town Priest
- J. J. Johnston as Stationmaster
- John Krasinski as Caddy / Judge's assistant (uncredited)

== Production ==
The plot involves the on-location production in Waterford, Vermont, of a film called The Old Mill. The actual film was shot in Massachusetts in Manchester-by-the-Sea, Beverly, Dedham and Waltham.

== Reception ==
On the review aggregator website Rotten Tomatoes, it has an approval rating of 84%, based on 115 reviews. The website's critics consensus reads: "State and Main offers plenty of wit and laughs in its lampoons of the movie industry." Metacritic, which uses a weighted average, assigned the film a score of 75 out of 100, based on 26 critics, indicating "generally favorable" reviews.

=== Awards ===
- Casting Society of America
  - Won: Artios – Best Casting for Feature Film – Comedy (Avy Kaufman)
- Chicago Film Critics Association
  - Nominated: Best Screenplay (David Mamet)
- Florida Film Critics Circle
  - Won: Best Ensemble Cast
  - Won: Best Screenplay (David Mamet)
- Fort Lauderdale International Film Festival
  - Won: Jury Award – Best Film (David Mamet)
  - Won: Best Supporting Male (William H. Macy)
- National Board of Review
  - Won: Best Acting by an Ensemble
- Online Film Critics Society
  - Won: Best Ensemble Cast Performance (tied with Almost Famous)
  - Nominated: Best Screenplay (David Mamet)
- Satellite Awards
  - Nominated: Best Motion Picture – Comedy or Musical
  - Nominated: Best Performance by an Actress in a Supporting Role – Comedy or Musical (Rebecca Pidgeon)
  - Nominated: Best Screenplay – Original (David Mamet)
