= Faded Glamour: The Best of Animals That Swim =

Compilation album by Animals That Swim
- Released: 2004
- Genre: Alternative
- Label: Snowstorm

Faded Glamour: The Best of Animals That Swim is a 2004 compilation best-of album by British alternative rock band Animals That Swim, released in 2004 via Snowstorm.

== Critical reception ==
Kitty Empire in The Guardian rued Animals That Swim relative lack of success compared to some peers "Too dignified to chase fame, too rueful for the Britpop bandwagon and plagued by terrible luck" but that this "compilation of their touchstones sorely deserves a fanfare." Title song "Faded Glamour" is a "criminally unheard of gem of its era... the 14 tracks take in their happiest song 'Madame Yevonde', the elegant 'East St O'Neill' and the fabulously sodden 'King Beer': songs too good to be left exclusively to the recollections of sentimental music journalists." Uncut said this "judiciously selected collection highlights their ennui-soaked glory perfectly." They highlight the "yearning, hyper-literate twilight pop (Leonard Cohen romanticism multiplied by The Teardrop Explodes)" and their "intelligent barfly persona, particularly the bizarre imaginary tale of Roy Orbison on 'Roy' and the doleful 'King Beer', made them a haven from gormless grunge."

== Track listing ==
1. Faded Glamour
2. Pink Carnations
3. Longest Road
4. Roy
5. All Your Stars Are Out
6. Dirt
7. Smooth Steps
8. Moon and the Mothership
9. East St O'Neill
10. Madame Yevonde
11. 50 Dresses
12. Mackie's Wake
13. King Beer
14. 7 Days
15. Learning To Fly
16. Chapel Market
17. Kandy Kars
18. May
19. An Unbeaten Horse (Demo)
20. Log City Road
21. The Greenhouse (Single Version)
22. Theme From Driving Home
23. Oregon State Fair
24. Me And Harry Dean
25. Mexico (Demo)
26. New Boots
27. Happiness From A Distant Star (Version)
28. Weary Mind

== Personnel ==
Animals That Swim

- Hank Starrs – drums, lead vocals, artwork
- Hugh Barker – guitar, keyboards, melodica, harmonica, vocals, lead vocals
- Al Barker – piano, hammond organ, guitar, vocals
- Del Crabtree – trumpet, talking, artwork
- Anthony Coote – bass guitar, guitar, percussion, additional vocals
