= I Was the King, I Really Was the King =

Studio album by Animals That Swim
- Released: June 1996
- Recorded: 1995–1996 at Intimate Studios, London
- Genre: Alternative
- Length: 42:19
- Label: Elemental
- Producer: Dare Mason

Animals That Swim chronology
Workshy (1994)	I Was the King, I Really Was the King (1996)	Happiness From a Distant Star (2001)

Singles from I Was the King, I Really Was the King
- 1. "The Greenhouse" Released: February 1996; 2. "Faded Glamour" Released: May 1996

I Was the King, I Really Was the King is the second album by British alternative rock band Animals That Swim, released in June 1996 via Elemental Records. Its title is taken from a line in the book This is Orson Welles.

== Critical reception ==
I Was the King, I Really Was the King received mixed to positive reviews upon release. AllMusic's Ned Raggett saw the LP as a natural progression from the band's debut album, Workshy, but more energetic and "pop-friendly". He drew musical comparisons with Marc Almond's solo material and the songs of Simple Minds, and highlighted "The Longest Road" as one of the album's best tracks, stating that the trumpet playing of Del Crabtree gave the band's sound an integral uniqueness;

Crabtree's trumpet once more gives a very specific identity to the songs – it isn't simply added on, but becomes part of it, replacing what might have been in a less inventive group go-nowhere guitar or keyboard soloing... Fine numbers include "The Longest Road," one of Crabtree's best performances featuring on an at once brisk and melancholy song with a wonderful, subtly addicting chorus...

John Harris, writing for Q magazine in July 1996, thought that the album was "slightly compromised by a new-found accent on aural polish" compared to that of the group's debut LP, but went on to single out "Faded Glamour", "Kitkats and Vinegar" and "The Greenhouse" as the album's highlights, in which "chief vocalist and lyricist Hank Starrs sculpts beautifully human vignettes, while the band provide shining evidence of their lofty musicality." Vox magazine's Mark Beaumont thought that the record was "a far more solid affair" than Workshy, surmising that the group had placed more emphasis on melody in comparison to their earlier output. He highlighted "The Greenhouse" and "East St O'Neill" as standout tracks, and ended his review with a short summation of the album's overall sound; "Horns parp convincingly, guitars swagger rather than stagger, choruses seem to have some idea of where they want to be in 30 seconds' time and Animals That Swim emerge as – gasp! – actual, potential pop stars".

Professional ratings
Review scores
Source	Rating
AllMusic	3/5 stars
Q	3/5 stars
Vox	8/10

=== Accolades ===
Publication	Country	Accolade	Year	Rank
NME	United Kingdom	Best 50 Albums of the Year	1996	39
Vox	United Kingdom	Best 50 Albums of the Year	1996	33

== Track listing ==
No.	Title	Writer(s)	Length
1.	"Faded Glamour"	H. Barker	3:09
2.	"A Good Xmas"	D. Crabtree	2:57
3.	"The Longest Road"	H. Barker	4:15
4.	"East St O'Neill"	H. Barker/H. Starrs	2:28
5.	"The Greenhouse"	H. Barker/H. Starrs	4:39
6.	"Shipley"	D. Crabtree	3:48
7.	"Kitkats and Vinegar"	H. Barker/D. Law	3:08
8.	"London Bridge"	H. Barker/H. Starrs	3:20
9.	"Bed Island"	H. Barker/H. Starrs	4:00
10.	"Near The Moon"	H. Barker	3:19
11.	"Despatches From Lula"	H. Barker	4:34
12.	"The Good Old Way"	H. Barker	2:37

- Track 5 is an alternate version to the single release issued in February 1996.

== Personnel ==
Animals That Swim

- Hank Starrs – drums, lead vocals, artwork
- Hugh Barker – guitar, keyboards, melodica, harmonica, vocals, lead vocals
- Al Barker – piano, hammond organ, guitar, vocals
- Del Crabtree – trumpet, talking, artwork
- Anthony Coote – bass guitar, guitar, percussion, additional vocals

Additional personnel

- Dare Mason – producer, engineer, programming
- Rachel Davies – violin
- Derek Crabtree – additional vocals
- Una McNulty – additional vocals
- Michelle Grass – additional vocals
- Julie Green – additional vocals
- Andrew Scroope – sleeve photography
- Howard Sooley – band photography, artwork

== Release history ==
Region	Date	Format	Label	Catalogue No.
UK	June 1996	LP; CD; MC	Elemental Records	ELM37LP; ELM37CD; ELM37MC
