= Animals That Swim =

UK musical group

- Origin: London, England, UK
- Genre: Indie rock
- Years active: 1989–2001, 2011–present
- Labels: Beachheads In Space; Che Trading; Elemental; Snowstorm
- Members: Hugh Barker; Hank Starrs; Al Barker; Del Crabtree
- Past members: Charlie Luciano (original line-up); Dave Harris (1991); Lenie Mets (1991–93); Anthony Coote (1993–96); Terry de Castro (2000–01)

Animals That Swim are a musical group who formed in London, England, 1989, with a line-up of stand-up drums, piano, trumpet and "a nice line in clever narrative lyrics".

== History ==
The band was initially formed by brothers Hugh Barker and Hank Starrs (born Jeffery Barker), before adding third brother Al Barker to the line-up, along with Del Crabtree, initially on bass guitar, followed by the trumpet. Throughout their history, the group had numerous bass players; Charlie Luciano (original line-up), then Crabtree, Dave Harris (1991), Lenie Mets (1991–93), Anthony Coote (1993–96) and Terry De Castro (2000–01).

Animals That Swim released their debut single, "King Beer", in 1992 via their own Beachheads In Space record label. It was a 7" vinyl-only release, limited to just 300 copies. Their second single, "Roy" (which took the form of an imaginary conversation with the ghost of Roy Orbison), was released the following year. This, along with their third single, "50 Dresses" – a 10" vinyl-only EP – helped the band come to wider attention as the group won critical acclaim for their mixture of "slice of life" lyrics and magic realism, and their distinctive use of the trumpet as a lead instrument.

Having had several single of the weeks in the UK's national music press, the band issued a further single in September, 1994, "Madame Yevonde", as a prelude to their debut album Workshy. The single's title, along with the album's sleeve art, both referenced the British photography pioneer of the same name. "Pink Carnations", a 5-track single, followed 6 months later, featuring an alternate version to the album mix. 'Workshy' was number 15 in the NME's list of best albums of 1994.

The band issued two albums on the Elemental label, but work on a third LP eventually ground to a halt after Elemental was taken over by One Little Indian in 1996. In 1999, a demo, "Dirt", was featured on a various artists EP on the independent Snowstorm label, which subsequently commissioned a third Animals That Swim album, some of which was recorded in producer Dare Mason's home. In a preview article for a gig at The Monarch, London on 9 August 2000, John Robinson, writing for The Guardian, commented on the band's comeback from a three-year absence;

Animals That Swim — the group of beaten-looking thirtysomethings that [Hank] fronts — are the vehicle for his observations, and having enjoyed a penurious existence for eight years, this gig, after a three-year gap, represents a suitably down-at-heel return to public performance. The group's evident poverty is only matched, however, by the richness of their music.

The band was inactive from 2001 to 2011, although Snowstorm issued a best of compilation album, Faded Glamour in 2004, with sleevenotes by Hugh Barker.

== Recent updates ==
In 2007 frontman and lead singer Hank Starrs – now a film producer — made a brief comeback to guest on the single "Direct Hit" with English art-pop group Art Brut. Hugh Barker works as a literary editor and is co-author of Faking It, a book about authenticity in music. His second book Hedge Britannia was published by Bloomsbury in March 2012. Al Barker went to university as a mature student and now works as communications manager for an education foundation in London.

The band were asked to play gigs in London in 2008 2010, 2012 and 2020, but they declined.

In 2009, former Animals That Swim and Goya Dress bassist Terry De Castro (better known as a member of Cinerama and The Wedding Present) released a cover version of the group's song "East St. O'Neill" on her solo album A Casa Verde.

In March 2011, the band recorded two new songs, "Tiny Lucifer" and "Silver Rays", which were released online.

Plans to record more songs are currently on hold as the band have been unable to find enough spare time or energy to do it.

Workshy was re-released in 2017 with some remixed demos on a bonus disc or download by One Little Independent records. (previously One Little Indian)

In July 2017 Del blew on some tunes for the Chasing Chevrons EP by South London song-smith Jamie Skint.

== Band members ==
- Hugh Barker – guitar
- Hank Starrs – vocals, drums
- Al Barker – keyboards, guitar
- Del Crabtree – bass guitar, trumpet

== Discography ==
=== Studio albums ===
- Workshy (1994)
- I Was the King, I Really Was the King (1996)
- Happiness From A Distant Star (2001)

=== Compilation albums ===
- Faded Glamour: The Best of Animals That Swim (2004)

=== Singles and EPs ===
- "King Beer" (7", 1992)
- "Roy"/"Weary Mind" (7", 1993)
- "50 Dresses" EP (10", 1993)
- "Madame Yevonde" (7"/CD, 1994)
- "Pink Carnations" EP (7"/CD, 1995)
- "The Greenhouse" (7"/CD, 1996)
- "Faded Glamour" (7"/CD, 1996)
- "The Moon And The Mothership" (7"/CD, 2001)
- "All Your Stars Are Out" (7", 2001)
- "Tiny Lucifer"/"Silver Rays" (download, 2011)
