= Juliette de Baïracli Levy =

English herbalist and author

- Born: 11 November 1912; Manchester, England
- Died: 28 May 2009 (aged 96)
- Education: University of Manchester, University of Liverpool, England
- Medical career
- Profession: Herbalist; Veterinarian

Juliette de Baïracli Levy (11 November 1912 – 28 May 2009) was an English herbalist and author noted for her pioneering work in holistic medicine. After studying veterinary medicine at the Universities of Manchester and Liverpool for two years, Bairacli Levy left England to study herbal medicine in Sierra Nevada (Spain), Europe, Turkey, North Africa, Israel and Greece, living with Romani people, farmers and livestock breeders, acquiring a fund of herbal lore from them in the process, most notably from the Romani people. She wrote several well-known books on herbalism and nomadic living in harmony with nature, in addition to fiction and poetry illustrated by Olga Lehmann. After living for some time on the Greek island Kythira, de Baïracli Levy moved to an old age home in Burgdorf, Switzerland.

== Partial bibliography ==
- Medicinal Herbs: their use in Canine Ailments, London: A.P.Tayler & Co, 1943.
- Look! The Wild Swans (novel), illustrated by Olga Lehmann, London: C.W. Daniel Co.; Manchester: Rochford, Bairacli Books, 1947.
- Puppy Rearing by Natural Methods, New York: Sirius House, 1948.
- The Cure for Canine Distemper, London: Fowler & Co., 1930, (revised and enlarged) 1950.
- Herbal Handbook For Farm and Stable, London: Faber & Faber, 1952, 1963.
- As Gypsies Wander: Being an account of life with gypsies in England, Provence, Spain, Turkey, London: Faber & Faber, 1962.
- The Bride of Llew (novel), illustrated by Olga Lehmann, London: Faber & Faber, 1953.
- Spanish Mountain Life: the Sierra Nevada, London: Faber & Faber, 1955.
- The Complete Herbal Book for the Dog, London: Faber & Faber, 1955, 1975, 1984.
- Wanderers in the New Forest, London: Faber & Faber, 1958, ISBN 0-571-77087-8.
- Summer in Galilee, London: Faber & Faber, 1959.
- A Gypsy in New York, London: Faber & Faber, 1962.
- A Herbal Handbook for Everyone, London: Faber & Faber, 1966.
- The Natural Rearing of Children, London: Faber & Faber, 1970.
- The Complete Herbal Handbook for the Dog and Cat, London: Faber & Faber, 1971.
- Traveler's Joy, ISBN 0-87983-651-2.
- Nature's Children, ISBN 0-9614620-8-6.
- Common Herbs for Natural Health, ISBN 0-9614620-9-4
- The Yew Wreath (a book of twenty poems), illustrated by Olga Lehmann.
- The Willow Wreath (a book of twenty poems).
- The Cypress Wreath (a book of twenty poems).
- A Gypsy in New York (new edition, back in print), Woodstock, NY: Ash Tree Publishing, 2011 ISBN 978-1-888123-08-1
- Spanish Mountain Life (new edition, back in print), Woodstock, NY: Ash Tree Publishing, 2011 ISBN 978-1-888123-07-4
- Summer in Galilee (new edition, back in print), Woodstock, NY: Ash Tree Publishing, 2011 ISBN 978-1-888123-06-7
- Mi vida en una montaña española - Viejo molino de Góngoras al pie de Sierra Nevada, Editorial Trifolium, 2018 ISBN 978-84-9475-81-33
