= Anthony Coote =

English musician

Anthony Coote is an English musician (guitar/bass guitar/keyboards/vocal) who has worked with a number of groups and individuals.

He was recruited to Ruby Blue in 1988 following an advertisement in the Melody Maker magazine and was present on their albums Glances Askances (Red Flame, 1987) Down from Above (Fontana, 1990) and Broken Water (Red Flame 1992) He provided the lead guitar solo for the remix of the John Martyn single "Deny This Love" (Permanent Records, Perm S12) from the album The Apprentice (1990). Coote left Ruby Blue along with lead vocalist with Rebecca Pidgeon in 1991 before moving to America. Rebecca signed to the Chesky label and Anthony collaborated in her first two albums The Raven (1994) and The New York Girls' Club (1996) which were recorded in New York. Anthony was featured guitarist on both.

After Ruby Blue Anthony joined the group Animals That Swim replacing Lenie Mets as bass guitar player in 1993. Anthony left the group in 1996. In 1997 he featured as bassist on the David Gedge led group Cinerama.

Anthony's latest appearance is with the South African pianist Richard Wilson as guitarist on the album "Archipelago" (2006) which was recorded on the cruise ship The World.

As of 2014, Anthony was working in London as one half of the La Dolce Vita violin/guitar duo.
