= Two-Bit Waltz =

2014 American comedy film

- Theatrical release poster
- Directed by: Clara Mamet
- Written by: Clara Mamet
- Produced by: Eric B. Fleischmann
- Starring: Clara Mamet; Jared Gilman; Rebecca Pidgeon; David Paymer; William H. Macy
- Cinematography: Mac Fisken
- Edited by: William Rubenstein
- Music by: Giona Ostinelli
- Production companies: EBF Productions; Matchstick
- Distributed by: Monterey Media
- Release dates: April 19, 2014 (Tribeca); October 24, 2014 (United States)
- Running time: 79 minutes
- Country: United States
- Language: English
- Box office: $2,540

Two-Bit Waltz is a 2014 American comedy-drama film, written and directed by Clara Mamet in her directorial debut. It stars Mamet, Jared Gilman, Rebecca Pidgeon, David Paymer and William H. Macy. The film had its world premiere at the Tribeca Film Festival on April 19, 2014, and was released in a limited release on October 24, 2014, by Monterey Media.

== Premise ==
Maude is suspended from school, loses a friend, and has a broken heart, and lack of inspiration for her novel leads to her downfall.

== Cast ==
- Clara Mamet as Maude
- Jared Gilman as Bernie
- Rebecca Pidgeon as Anita
- David Paymer as The Lawyer
- William H. Macy as Carl
- Ella Dershowitz as Jenny
- John Pirruccello as The Therapist
- Matt Malloy as Guidance Counselor
- Matt O'Leary as Max
- Jason Pickar as Rabbi

== Production ==
In 2012, an Indiegogo campaign was set up for the film announcing Clara Mamet would direct the film from a screenplay she had written and star with William H. Macy, Jared Gilman, Rebecca Pidgeon and John Pirruccello, with Eric B. Fleischman producing. The campaign was unsuccessful, only raising $10,268 out of a $115,000 goal.

== Release ==
The film had its world premiere at the Tribeca Film Festival on April 19, 2014. Shortly after Monterey Media acquired distribution rights to the film. It was released in a limited release on October 24, 2014.
