= Jared Gilman =

American actor (born 1998)

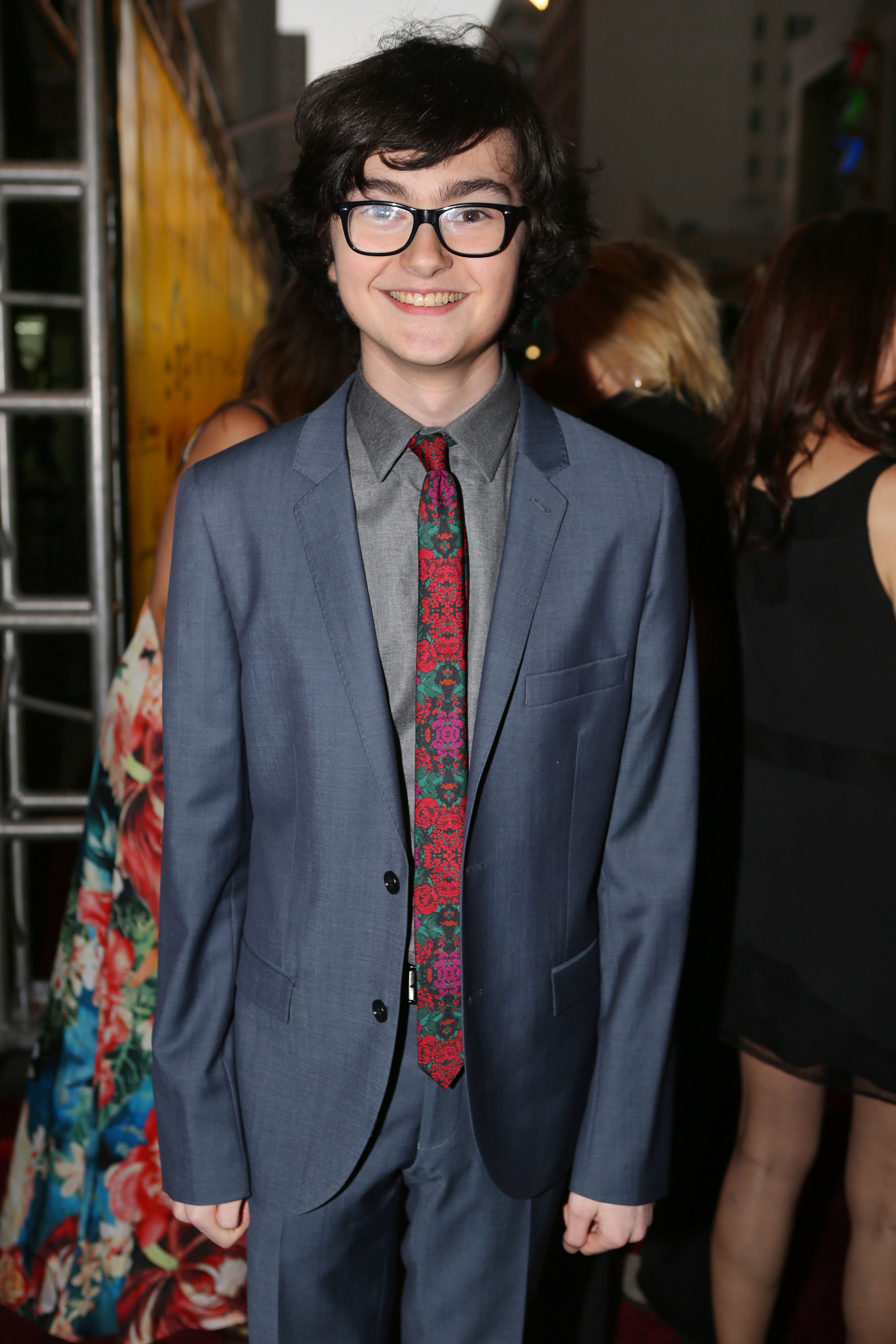
- Gilman at the premiere of Elsa & Fred at the Miami International Film Festival in 2014
- Born: Jared T. Raynor Gilman; December 28, 1998 (age 27); New Jersey, US
- Education: New York University
- Occupation: Actor
- Years active: 2012–present

Jared T. Raynor Gilman (born December 28, 1998) is an American actor best known for his role as Sam Shakusky in the 2012 Wes Anderson film Moonrise Kingdom, which earned him a 2014 Young Artist Award nomination as Best Leading Young Actor in a Feature Film.

== Personal life ==
A resident of South Orange, New Jersey, Gilman has attended Chatham Day School and Newark Academy in Livingston, New Jersey. He was on his school's golf club. He currently attends Tisch School of the Arts at New York University. Gilman is Jewish. He is asexual.

== Career ==
Gilman got his first professional acting role as Sam Shakusky in Moonrise Kingdom at age 12. In preparation for the film, Gilman studied canoeing, cooking over an open fire, and Clint Eastwood's character in Escape from Alcatraz. In 2016 he appeared in Paterson, once again alongside Kara Hayward.

Gilman has scripted, acted in, and edited his own short action videos.

Gilman has appeared in an outdoor-themed commercial for Verizon Wireless.

== Filmography ==
| Year | Title | Role | Notes | Awards |
|---|---|---|---|---|
| 2012 | Moonrise Kingdom | Sam Shakusky | Lead role | Nominated - Young Artist Award for Best Leading Young Actor in a Feature Film |
| 2014 | Elsa & Fred | Michael | | |
| 2014 | Two-Bit Waltz | Bernie | | |
| 2015 | No Letting Go | Wes | | |
| 2016 | Paterson | Male Student | | |
| 2017 | Juvie | Booker | | |
| 2018 | The Reservoir | Aaron | Short film | |
| 2018 | It Takes Three | Cy Berger | | |
| 2021 | Overlook | Tyler | Short film | |
| 2022 | Angry Neighbors | Jack | | |
| 2022 | Susie Searches | Jed | | |
| 2025 | Weird Kisses | Connor | Short film | |
