= Andrew George Lehmann =

Andrew George Lehmann (17 February 1922 – 9 July 2006) was a literary critic, academic, and seminal author and essayist in French Symbolism, and the intellectual history of European Romanticism.

== Early life ==
Born in Chile to Mary Grisel Lehmann (née Bissett) and Andrew William Lehmann, a mining engineer, Professor Lehmann was the younger brother of Olga Lehmann and Monica Pidgeon. His father was of German and French descent (born in Paris) and his mother was Scottish. Naturalized a British citizen and educated at Dulwich College, London, and The Queen's College, Oxford, he demonstrated impressive intellectual and athletic capabilities, achieving the status of Junior Fencing Champion for England. In 1942, he married Alastine Mary Bell, by whom he had three children.

== Career ==
He was commissioned in to the 6th Rajputana Rifles of the British Indian Army on the 26 November 1942. He contracted poliomyelitis, which effectively put an end to any athletic ambitions, but did nothing to diminish his intellectual and academic achievements after the war. He relinquished his commission due to ill health and was granted the honorary rank of lieutenant on 19 May 1944.

In addition to his literary output, Lehmann assumed a variety of academic posts at the Universities of Manchester, Reading, worked as a director of Linguaphone, and in 1983 accepted the post of Rank Foundation Professor of European Studies and dean of studies at University of Buckingham, which he held until his retirement in 1988.

== Other work ==
He was on the governing body of Abingdon School from 1966-1969.

== Selected books ==
- The Symbolist Aesthetic in France, 1885–1895, Oxford: Blackwell, 1950, 1968.
- Sainte-Beuve: a portrait of the critic, 1804–1842, Oxford: Clarendon Press, 1962.
- The European Heritage: an outline of Western culture, Oxford: Phaidon, 1984. ISBN 978-0-7148-2307-2, ISBN 0-7148-2307-4.
