= Ruby Blue (band) =

Scottish folk pop band

- Origin: Edinburgh, Scotland
- Genres: Folk pop, folk rock
- Years active: 1986–1993
- Labels: Red Flame, Universal, Aris
- Past members: Rebecca Pidgeon; Roger Fife; Anthony Coote; Erika Spotswood; Chris Buck; Karlos Edwards

Ruby Blue was a Scottish folk pop band formed by singer Rebecca Pidgeon and guitarist Roger Fife in the 1980s.

Pidgeon was a student at the Royal Academy of Dramatic Arts. In 1986, her friend Roger Fife, a guitarist, asked her to sing on a demo tape of his music which was then sent to Red Flame Records in London. After hearing the demo, the label signed Pidgeon and Fife and released their first album, Glances Askances.

Pidgeon became the lead singer of Ruby Blue, which included Anthony Coote on bass guitar, Erika Spotswood on backing vocals, and session musician Chris Buck on drums. Buck was later replaced on drums by Karlos Edwards and then Pascal Consoli. Coote and Pidgeon left in 1990. Pidgeon went to the U.S. and pursued an acting career. Erika Spotswood (now Woods) took her place on lead vocals.

Woods and Fife kept the band's name, releasing the album Almost Naked in 1993. The album was unsuccessful, and Ruby Blue disbanded. Woods moved to Los Angeles and married Tony Philips, the producer of Ruby Blue's Down from Above album. Fife moved to New York and he became a producer and worked with Cyndi Lauper, Antony and the Johnsons, and Tricky.

== Discography ==
- Glances Askances (Red Flame, 1987)
- Down from Above (Fontana, 1990)
- Paradise (Red Flame, 1991)
- Broken Water (Red Flame, 1992)
- Almost Naked (Red Flame, 1993)
- Remasters (Universal, 2011)
