= Olga Lehmann =

British-Chilean painter, costume and set designer (1912–2001)

- Born: Louise Olga Mary Lehmann; 10 February 1912; Catemu, Valparaíso Region, Chile
- Died: 26 October 2001 (aged 89); Saffron Walden, Essex, England, UK
- Citizenship: British (from 1928)
- Education: Slade School of Fine Art, 1934
- Occupations: Painter; graphic designer; costume designer; set designer
- Spouse: Edward Richard Carl Huson (m. 1939; died 1984)
- Children: Paul Huson
- Relatives: Monica Pidgeon (sister); Andrew George Lehmann (brother)

Louise Olga Mary Lehmann (married name Huson; 10 February 1912 – 26 October 2001) was a British–Chilean painter and graphic, costume and set designer.

== Early life ==
The Dark Avenger costume design by Olga Lehmann, 1954.

Lehmann was born Louise Olga Mary Lehmann on 10 February 1912 in Catemu, to Andrew William Lehmann (1878–1970), a mining engineer and chairman of a copper mining company, and Mary Grisel Lehmann (née Bissett; 1888–1982). Lehmann's father was born in Paris to French and German parents, and her mother was Scottish. The eldest of three siblings, Lehmann was the sister of Monica Pidgeon, an architectural journalist and editor, and Andrew George Lehmann, a literary critic, writer and academic.

Initially educated by an English governess, Lehmann later studied at Cambridge School. (Note: Also cited as Santiago College.) In 1921, aged 9, Lehmann was sent to England where she studied at the Dulwich High School for Girls until 1926. Returning to Chile in 1927, Lehmann studied at Santiago College. Becoming a naturalised British citizen in 1928, Lehmann and her family settled in Lambeth the following year.

Awarded a scholarship to study at Slade School of Fine Art in 1929, Lehmann studied under Henry Tonks and Randolph Schwabe, specializing in theatrical design under Vladimir Polunin and in portraiture under Allan Gwynne-Jones. Awarded student prizes in life painting, composition, and theatrical design, Lehmann graduated in 1934.

== Career ==
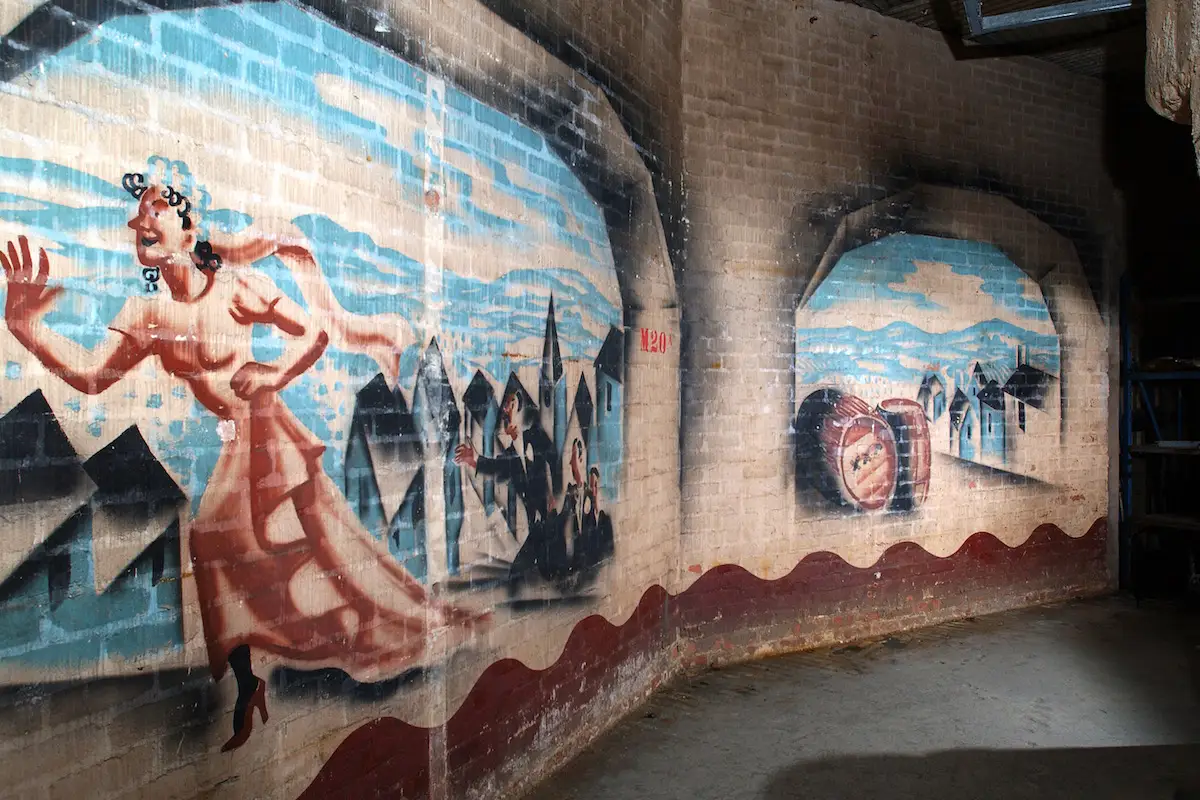
Murals in Bristol Aircraft Company's underground wartime factory canteen, 1943

Her productive working life as an artist spanned almost six decades, from the 1930s to the 1980s. Throughout the 1930s she acquired a reputation in the fields of mural painting and portraiture. She exhibited her work at the Royal Society of Portrait Painters in 1933, and with the London Group in 1935. Later sitters of note consisted of people associated with the film or record industries such as singers Edric Connor, Carmen Prietto, conductor Richard Austin, and actors Dirk Bogarde and Patrice Wymore. During the Blitz in 1940, her studio-flat in Hampstead was destroyed by a bomb, and much of her early work was lost.

After World War II, her name chiefly became associated with graphic design for the Radio Times, and designing for the film and television industries. In 1939 she married author and editor Edward Richard Carl Huson, by whom she had one son, author and television writer and producer Paul Huson. She was predeceased by her husband in 1984, and she herself died in Saffron Walden, Essex, in 2001.

== Works ==
=== Illustration, design, and graphic work ===
Radio Times illustrations
issue	title
29 June 1941	The Suicide Club meets...
11 July 1941	Kitchen Front
30 July 1941	Don't pass it on, but...
8 August 1941	The Raggle-Taggle Gypsies, O!
12 October 1941	But lovelier than the cornfield...
20 November 1941	The Canterville Ghost
23 November 1941	Three Sisters
15 December 1941	The Star in the East
28 December 1941 –3 January 1942	What the other Listener thinks
10 January 1942	The Dancers
17 January 1942	The Dark Charmer
1 February 1942	And the more I bring off...
6 March 1942	Easy Murder
13 March 1942	Gestapo over Europe
26 March 1942	Pagliacci
2 April 1942	Grim Fairy Tale
8 April 1942	Faust
26 April 1942	Alexander Nevsky
3 May 1942 –9 May 1942	Japan wants the Earth (cover)
14 June 1942 –20 June 1942	Carmen (cover)
6 July 1942	Next of Kin
15 July 1942	The Words upon the Window Pane
21 July 1942	Ladies in Retirement
4 September 1942	Death in the hand
9 September 1942	Tales of Hoffmann
30 September 1942	The Magic Flute
16 October 1942	Maude
6 November 1942	The Beggar Student
4 December 1942	Ruslan and Ludmilla
19 December 1942	La traviata
18 December 1942	Programs up to Boxing Day and Turandot
4 January 1943	Cinderella
20 January 1943	The Force of Destiny
24 January 1943 –30 January 1943	Hassan
6 February 1943	Madame Butterfly
17 February 1943	La bohème
26 February 1943	Robinson Crusoe
7 March 1943	Liebestraum
17 March 1943	Fidelio
11 April 1943 –17 April 2007	Les Cloches
29 April 1943	Royal Gesture
2 May 1943	Dona Claries
17 May 1943	The Wild Duck
6 June 1943	A Princess of Tartary
25 June 1943	Master Peter's Puppet Show
2 August 1943	How to arrange a Concert
26 September 1943 –2 October 1943	Samson and Delilah
17 October 1943	Ring up the Curtain
27 October 1943	Romeo and Juliet
22 December 1943	The Flying Dutchman
26 December 1943 –1 January 1944	Cinderella
16 January 1944	Distant Point
19 January 1944	Carmen
14 February 1944	The Hostage
23 April 1944 –29 April 1944	A Play Toward and Aïda
6 May 1944	The Man Stayed Alone
23 June 1944	Alexander Nevsky
25 June 1944	The Story of the Ballet
30 June 1944	Romeo and Juliet
24 September 1944	Emilia
7 October 1944	The Second Mrs Tanqueray
8 November 1944	Turandot
9 November 1944	The Story of the Ballet #2
10 November 1944	L’Arlesienne
4 December 1944	Treasure Island
26 December 1944	Boxing Day (4 corner vignettes)
9 January 1945	A Voyage to Lilliput
11 February 1945	The Story of the Ballet #3, illustration of Sunday Rhapsody
28 March 1945	Scheherazade
25 April 1945	The Tale of Tsar Saltan
1 May 1945	Tuesday Serenade
18 July 1945	A Princess of Tartary
23 August 1945	Corner in Crime
29 August 1945	The Wizard of the Mountain
3 September 1945	The Wild Duck
9 September 1945 –15 September 1945	Paul Temple Returns
1 November 1945	Golden Dragon City
21 November 1945	Schwanda the Bagpiper
19 December 1945	Prince Igor
30 January 1946	Tosca
21 February 1946	Treasure Island
6 April 1946	Music for Saturday Night
2 May 1946	Bounden Duty
10 August 1946	A Hundred Years Old
11 September 1946	Lord Mondrago
19 September 1946	It Might Have Been the Moon
22 September 1946 –28 September 1946	La bohème
6 November 1946	Pagliacci
5 December 1946	The Turn of the Screw
21 December 1946	Children in Uniform
28 December 1946	Androcles and the Lion.
10 February 1947	Biography
15 March 1947	Save him, Doctor...
22 March 1947	Mary Rose
5 April 1947	The Silver Cord
21 April 1947	The Laughing Woman
11 June 1947	The Man who was Thursday
21 June 1947	To What Red Hell
7 September 1947	The Poet and the Child
13 September 1947	If
8 October 1947	The Flying Dutchman
16 October 1947	Beyond the Night
24 November 1947	The Narrow Corner
18 January 1948 –24 January 1948	Xerxes
12 February 1948	The Black Cap has to wait
5 May 1948	Eugene Onegin
8 June 1948	The Family from One-End Street
2 August 1948	The Lost Horizon
30 August 1948	The Healing Stream
28 September 1948	The first post will be opened tonight
9 November 1948	Focus on Old Age
2 January 1949	Scamps in Paradise
18 January 1949	Focus on Child Adoption
25 March 1949	The Great Ruby Ming
22 July 1949	Bizet's Carmen
28 July 1949	The Rise and Decline of Johnny Godwin
14 August 1949 –20 August 1949	The Story of ‘Lulu.’
26 August 1950	Point of Honour
1 September 1950	Summer Showtime
15 September 1950	Promenade Concert
26 December 1950	Boxing Day, two double-spreads
20 April 1951	Stars from the Shows
18 July 1951	Shanties and Forebitters
5 August 1951	Summer Showtime
17 August 1951	Songs from the Shows
1 October 1951	The Bottom of the Well.
2 March 1952	Dona Clarines
14 June 1952	Cried the Sparrow
4 July 1952	Songs from the Shows
31 July 1952	Summer Rain
13 October 1952	Pagliacci.
15 February 1953	La traviata
1 July 1953	The Flower in the Rock
26 July 1953	The Lady from Albuquerque
10 October 1953	The Laughing Woman.
25 July 1954 –31 July 1954	The Flying Dutchman
14 September 1954	The Turn of the Screw
11 October 1954	The Turn of the Screw
17 October 1954	The Dark Eyed Sailor.
26 February 1955	The Cat and the Canary
12 April 1955	A Vegetarian Dish for April
30 September 1955	The Turn of the Screw
3 October 1955	From Morn to Midnight
30 December 1955	Music at Ten
31 December 1955	New Year's Eve, triple spread.
11 June 1956	Journey to Venezuela
30 November 1956	Memories of a Street of Artists
16 December 1956	The Lost Horizon.
13 January 1957	A Hundred Years Old
17 July 1957	Murder at Elstree
19 July 1957	Australian Saga
21 September 1957	Ruslan and Ludmilla
26 September 1957	Stories and Music from the Ballet.
25 January 1958	A Time of the Serpent
21 March 1958	Samson and Delilah
21 December 1958 –27 December 1958	Chu-Chin-Chow
21 December 1958	The Wraiths.
25 April 1959	Lost Love
29 June 1959	Shadow of a Pale Horse
2 August 1959	Enter Three Witches
29 November 1959 –5 December 1959	Where William Weare was Murdered.
23 July 1960	A Play for the Guide Festival
23 December 1960	Scamps in Paradise
31 December 1960	New Year's Eve, triple page spread.

- In 1936 Lehmann executed black and white designs for Pilkington Glass Ltd., and designed wallpapers for John Line, Ltd.
- In 1937 she illustrated the book Weekend Caravan, edited by S. Hillelson.
- In 1938 she illustrated the book Happy Heart, Some frontier folk I have met, fish, flesh and fowl, by Cora L. Shearburn.
- In 1940 Lehmann was permitted by the War Office to make sketches and drawings of London bomb damage, air raid shelters, and Air Raid Precautions personnel.
- In 1941, Lehmann began drawing monthly illustrations for the British Broadcasting Corporation's publication the Radio Times, commissions that would last over a period of almost two decades.
- Lehmann also started drawing illustrations for another BBC publication, The Listener, beginning with Louis Macneice's Cook's Tour of the London Subways. In 1941, Lehmann also illustrated the novel Look! The Wild Swans, by Juliette de Baïracli Levy (pictorial title page, frontis, six full-page and one half-page illustrations in black and white, pictorial card cover). She later illustrated a book of poetry by Levy, The Yew Wreath, (eight full-page black and white illustrations, pictorial card cover), and a second novel of Levy's, The Bride of Llew, (black and white illustrations, pictorial card cover).
- In 1942 Lehmann joined the London artists' agency R. P. Gossop, for illustration commissions.
- In 1946 Lehmann illustrated Fairy Tales from Turkey, collected by Naki Tezel, trans. Margery Kent, ed. Herbert Read (color frontis., seven full-page black and white illustrations).
- In 1947 Lehmann illustrated A Youthful Poet's Dream (black and white vertical half-page in The Children's Own Treasure Book, Odhams Press).
- In between 1948 and 1950 Lehmann also began drawing periodic illustrations for BBC Publications, the Arabic Listener.
- In 1948 she illustrated An Indian Boyhood by Noel Sircar, London: Hollis & Carter (21 chapter-head illustrations in black and white scraperboard, pictorial dust jacket); The Peddler (black and white pictorial border) in The Modern Gift Book for Children, Odhams Press; "How Dan met the Fairies of Elbolton" (full-page color, pictorial border to title and two text illustrations) in "The Children's Hour Annual", Odhams Press.
- In 1949 Lehmann illustrated the book jacket for Dead Lion by John and Emery Bonnett (Michael Joseph, London).
- In 1950 Lehmann executed illustrations for a year's advertising campaign for Murphy Radio Ltd. She also drew illustrations for The London Mystery Magazine, vol 1, number 2, The Trod, by Algernon Blackwood; and numbers 3, 4, 5, 6, The Slave Detective by Wallace Nichols.
- In 1952, she illustrated Singing Together – Rhythm and Melody, for BBC Publications.
- Lehmann also illustrated the cover for the Christmas issue of London Calling, the overseas journal of the BBC.
- She also drew the illustrations and designed the dust jacket for Evening Star, by M.E. Patchett, Lutterworth Press.
- Lehmann illustrated the 1953 London Calling, Christmas Issue cover.
- 1954–1957: Lehmann designed record sleeves for Argo Records (UK).
- 1954, Lehmann again illustrated the London Calling Christmas Issue cover.
- 1985: Lehmann illustrated and published The Wishing Chair and Other Verse, by her late husband, Carl Huson.
- 1986: Lehmann illustrated and published Spoken Words: World War II Poems, Tales & Memories, by Carl Huson.
- 1987: Lehmann illustrated and published Fine Feathers, a book of poems for children, by Carl Huson.

=== Murals ===
- In 1934 Olga Lehmann was commissioned by a French company, Stic-B Paints, Ltd, to paint murals in the Palace Hotel, Buxton.
- In 1935 Lehmann painted murals in the St Helier House Hotel, Jersey. She was chosen to design a canvas mural for the Queen Victoria Street Railway Bridge, London, to celebrate the Silver Jubilee of King George V and Queen Mary.
- Between 1936 and 1938 Lehmann painted murals for architect Clive Entwistle, and received multiple commissions from Stic-B Paints for murals in hotels, private buildings, shops and nurseries. In 1938 she exhibited mural designs at the Building Centre, Bond Street. London, with Mary Adshead, Aelred Bartlett, John Hutton, Roland Pym and Laurence Scarfe, and painted murals in Fuller's Restaurant, Sloane Street in 1939, just before the outbreak of World War II.
- In 1940 Lehmann painted murals for London Air Raid Precautions Headquarters, and received a permit from the War Office to execute sketches and drawings of London bomb damage, air raid shelters, and ARP personnel. In 1942 she painted murals at the Censorship Department, Holborn.
- 1943: Lehmann designed and painted murals for the workers' canteen in Bristol Aircraft Company's underground, wartime factory in Spring Quarry, Corsham. These are now part of MoD Corsham, and are grade II* listed. She also designed and painted murals in the Pavilion Hotel, Scarborough, and the Grand Hotel, Brighton, by which time she had entered the British film industry.
- In 1953 Lehmann painted a mural on canvas featuring Captain Bligh for Errol Flynn's Tichfield Hotel in Port Antonio, Jamaica.

=== Film, television, and theatrical design ===
- In 1941, Lehmann painted murals for the film Hi Gang! at Gainsborough Studios, Islington, and for the film Much Too Shy. She also joined the Association of Cine-Technicians union as a member of the Scenic Artists division, and painted scenery and mural decorations at Gaumont British Studios, Riverside Studios, Metro-Goldwyn-Mayer studios, and British National Studios.
- In 1943 she painted mural decorations for the film He Snoops to Conquer.
- In 1944 Lehmann joined the art department of British National Studios as a scenic artist. She painted mural decorations for the film Waltz Time.
- 1945: Lehmann painted mural decorations for the film Latin Quarter.
- 1946–1954: Lehmann was contracted to Associated British Picture Corporation, painting murals, scenery, portraits of contract stars; drawing continuity sketches and production designs.
- 1946: Lehmann executed paintings for the film The Ghosts of Berkeley Square.
- 1947: Lehmann painted portraits for the film No Room at the Inn, murals for the film Counterblast, and portraits and murals for the film The Three Weird Sisters.
- 1948: Lehmann painted mural decorations for the film Private Angelo.
- 1949: Lehmann painted portraits of Marlene Dietrich for Alfred Hitchcock's Stage Fright.
- 1950: Lehmann designed the opening credits and painted the portrait of Hugh Griffith for the film Laughter in Paradise.
- 1951: Lehmann painted scenic decoration on the film The Master of Ballantrae.
- 1954: Lehmann executed the storyboard and several costume designs for the film The Dark Avenger. She also did scenic decoration on the film Oh, Rosalinda!
- 1955: Lehmann painted the portraits and drew the storyboard for the London sequence of the film based on Jules Verne's novel, Michael Todd's Around the World in 80 Days. She also designed credit titles for the film Safari. She painted the portrait of Terry Moore for the film Portrait of Alison, and designed costumes for the films The Big Money and Gamma People.
- 1956: Lehmann devised and designed Vera-Ellen's ballet for Marcel Helman's film Let's be Happy. She also designed the costumes for the film Robbery under Arms.
- 1957: Lehmann designed the costumes and credit titles for George Pal's film The Adventures of Tom Thumb, and drew the storyboard for the film Inn of the Sixth Happiness.
- 1958: Lehmann designed the costumes for Robert Hamer's film The Scapegoat. She also drew the storyboard for Nicholas Ray's film The Savage Innocents.
- 1959: Lehmann drew the storyboard for Vincente Minnelli's film The Four Horsemen of the Apocalypse. She also painted portraits of Peter Sellers for Anthony Asquith's film The Millionairess.
- 1960: Lehmann became Film Art Director for the London advertising agency Mather & Crowther for two years. She also designed the costumes for Carl Foreman's film The Guns of Navarone, and costumes for the Girl Guides of Great Britain 25th Jubilee pageant.
- 1962: Lehmann formed Olga Lehmann Associates, and took the post of Production Designer for Rank Advertising Films, a position she held for over ten years. She also designed the costumes for Carl Foreman's film The Victors.
- 1966: Lehmann designed costumes for Tippi Hedren in Charlie Chaplin's film A Countess from Hong Kong.
- 1968: Lehmann designed costumes for the film Captain Nemo and the Underwater City.
- 1970: Lehmann designed costumes for the Delbert Mann's film Kidnapped.
- 1976: Lehmann designed costumes and painted a portrait for William Bast's adaptation for television of Dumas's The Man in the Iron Mask, produced by Norman Rosemont. She also designed costumes and painted a portrait for Rosemont's television film The Four Feathers.
- 1977: Lehmann received an Emmy nomination for outstanding costume design on The Man in the Iron Mask. She designed the costumes for Rosemont's television film Les Misérables.
- 1978: Lehmann received an Emmy nomination for outstanding costume design on The Four Feathers.
- 1979: Lehmann designed the costumes for Rosemont's television films Little Lord Fauntleroy and A Tale of Two Cities.
- 1981: Lehmann received an Emmy nomination for outstanding costume design on A Tale of Two Cities. Lehmann designed costumes for Rosemont's television films Ivanhoe and Witness for the Prosecution.
- 1983: Lehmann designed costumes and painted a portrait for William Bast's television adaptation of The Master of Ballantrae and for William Bast's television film The First Olympics: Athens 1896, both produced by Larry White.
- 1984: Lehmann received an Emmy nomination for outstanding costume design on The Master of Ballantrae.
- 1985: Lehmann painted portraits of Barbara Stanwyck, Charlton Heston and Stephanie Beacham for the Spelling/Shapiro/Cramer ABC television series The Colbys.

=== Exhibitions ===
==== One-woman ====
- The AIA Gallery, London.
- The Augustine Gallery, Holt.
- The Barnsdale Gallery, Yoxford, Suffolk.
- Canning House, London.
- Galeria Maldon.
- Gainsborough's House, Suffolk.
- The Guildhall, Thaxted.
- Heffer's Gallery, Cambridge.
- The Little Gallery, New Burlington Street, London.
- The Rushmore Rooms, St Catharine's College, Cambridge.
- The John Whibley Gallery, London.

==== Mixed ====
- The London Group.
- The Royal Portrait Society.
- The Building Centre, Bond Street, London: Exhibition of Murals, 1938.
- The Suffolk Art Society.
- The Dunmow Art Group.
- The New English Art Club.
- The Contemporary Portrait Society.
- The Phoenix Gallery, Lavenham.
- The Wright Hepburn Webster Gallery, New York.
- The National Society, London.
- The Society of Graphic Fine Art, London.
- The British Academy of Film and Television Arts, London.
- The Lyttelton Theatre, London.
- The Fry Art Gallery, Saffron Walden.
- Royal Academy of Arts, Diploma Galleries, London: The Slade 1871-1971.
- The Whitechapel Art Gallery: Mural and Decorative Painting, 1935.
- The Tate Gallery: Mural Painting in Great Britain, 1939.

=== Collections ===
- The Fry Art Gallery, Saffron Walden.
- The Boundary Gallery, London.
- The Harry Ransom Humanities Research Center, University of Austin, Texas.
- The British Film Institute, London.
- Bruce Denman Collection.
- David Cohen Collection.
- Robert Worley Collection.
- Nicholas de Piro Collection.
- Bill Connelly Collection.
- The Victoria and Albert Museum Archive of Art and Design, London.
- The Royal Air Force Museum Art Collection, London.
- The Imperial War Museum, London.
- The Slade School of Fine Art, London.
- University College London Art Museum.

=== Record sleeves ===
Created for Argo Records (UK), 1954 - 1957

- Under Milk Wood, the BBC recording.
- Robert Still: Quintet for Three Flutes, Violin and Cello.
- Songs from Jamaica, recorded by Edric Connor.
- Songs from Trinidad, recorded by Edric Connor.
- The Legend of Sarah Bernhardt, recorded by Esme Percy.
- Constant Lambert.
- Songs from Mexico.
- Béla Bartók.
- Fauré.
- Sir Edward Elgar.
- Calypso, recorded by Edric Connor.
- Sir William Walton.
- Music by William Byrd.
- The Waste Land, by T. S. Eliot.
- The Beggar's Opera.

== Further references ==
- Bacon, C. W., Scratchboard Drawing, "Olga Lehmann", Studio Publications, 1951.
- Branaghan, S., Chibnall, S, British Film Posters: An Illustrated History, British Film Institute, 2008, ISBN 1844572218.
- Fishenden, R. B., The Penrose Annual; Review of the Graphic Arts, "Olga Lehmann", Hastings House, 1953.
- Foss, B., War Paint: Art, War, State and Identity in Britain 1939-1945, Yale University Press, 2007.
- Harper, S., Women in Cinema, "Olga Lehmann", Continuum, 2000.
- York, Malcolm, Edward Bawden and his Circle, Woodbridge, Suffolk, Antique Collectors Club.
