= Glances Askances =

1987 debut album by Ruby Blue

Studio album by Ruby Blue
- Released: October 1987
- Recorded: Silent Music Studios, London
- Length: 33:56
- Label: Red Flame
- Producer: Rebecca Pidgeon; Roger Fife

Ruby Blue chronology
Glances Askances (1987)	Down from Above (1990)

Glances Askances is the debut studio album by Scottish folk pop band Ruby Blue, released by Red Flame in October 1987.

== Background ==
Rebecca Pidgeon and Roger Fife began working as a duo in 1986 after Fife asked Pidgeon to sing on a demo tape he was making. The tape, under the name R'n'R, was sent to Red Flame Records in London in the autumn of 1986. The head of Red Flame, David Kitson, was impressed by the recording and subsequently signed the duo, who then recorded their debut album Glances Askances for the label. The album was recorded and mixed at Silent Music Studios in London in January 1987, with "Give Us Back Our Flag" and "So Unlike Me" being remixed at London's Livingston Studios in April 1987. Glances Askances was recorded with the assistance of additional musicians such as drummer George Jeffrey and guitarist Alec Kane. After recording was completed, the duo adopted the name Ruby Blue.

In a 1990 interview with The Guardian, Pidgeon was dismissive of the album, stating, "The album was recorded for hardly any money, about £3,000, for a tiny label, and hardly anyone heard it. And since then we have had time to learn to play our instruments."

== Release ==
The album was released in October 1987 by Red Flame on vinyl only. The single "Give Us Back Our Flag" was released in June 1987 and was followed by a second single, "So Unlike Me", in September 1987. In 1991, Red Flame released the album on CD with new artwork.

== Critical reception ==
Professional ratings
Review scores
Source	Rating
NME	2/10

Upon its release, Music Week praised Glances Askances for containing "fine pop songs performed with great style on flowing arrangements". The reviewer summarised, "A fine debut with really gripping pop tones set for immortality." Dave Hill of The Independent called the album "rather nice" as the duo "mingle jazz, keyboards and acoustic folk with enough edge to prevent their ample sweetness from becoming sickly". He noted the range of tracks from "late-night cocktail muses, airy mantras, bad moods, and soft, watery blues", and added that Pidgeon has a "clever way of sounding tough without damaging the delicacy of her delivery". He concluded, "They are the kind of couple whose confessional closeness charms instead of making you wish they would shut up simpering and go home."

Patrick Weir of the NME criticised the album as an "awesomely staid debut" and an "irritating lesson in timidity and blandness". He felt much of the material "push[es] guileless plagiarism to the limit", with the songs displaying "third rate" variations of sounds reminiscent of Clannad, Cocteau Twins and Joni Mitchell. Weir added the songs are "maudlin, precious and forgettable" and felt the single "Give Us Our Flag Back" was "route in the extreme". He selected "So Unlike Me" as the album's "one brief joy", noting its "sentiments and sound are richly, movingly matched". In a review of the 1991 reissue on CD, the Rhondda Leader noted that it "gather[s] the best of roots influences from fair Ireland, America and the summer haze of rural England".

== Track listing ==
All songs written by Roger Fife and Rebecca Pidgeon except "Give Us Our Flag Back" and "Bless You" written by Fife, Pidgeon and Malcolm McKay, and "The Quiet Mind" by Pidgeon.

No.	Title	Length
1.	"Give Us Our Flag Back"	4:25
2.	"The Quiet Mind"	2:32
3.	"Just Relax"	4:33
4.	"So Unlike Me"	4:19
5.	"Walking Home"	4:47
6.	"The Meaning of Life"	3:10
7.	"Wintery Day"	4:39
8.	"Sitting in a Cafe"	3:50
9.	"Bless You"	1:41

== Personnel ==
Ruby Blue

- Rebecca Pidgeon – vocals, piano, keyboards, recorder
- Roger Fife – electric guitar, acoustic guitar, bass, backing vocals

Additional musicians

- Alec Kane – additional guitar, slide guitar, mandolin
- George Jeffrey – drums, percussion, marimba
- Vikas – piano
- Martin Pavey – additional slide guitar on "Sitting in a Cafe"

Production

- Rebecca Pidgeon, Roger Fife – producers, arrangement
- Martin Pavey – engineer
- Peter Millward – engineer
- Tony Harris – engineer

Design (1987 LP)

- Robert James – design
- Phillip Ambler – photography
- Rory Donaldson – sleeve image

Design (1991 CD)

- Derek Humphries – design, illustration
- Adam Hay – design
