= Redbelt =

2008 film by David Mamet

- Theatrical release poster
- Directed by: David Mamet
- Written by: David Mamet
- Produced by: Chrisann Verges
- Starring: Chiwetel Ejiofor; Tim Allen; Alice Braga; Randy Couture; Ricky Jay; Joe Mantegna; Emily Mortimer; David Paymer; Rebecca Pidgeon; Rodrigo Santoro
- Cinematography: Robert Elswit
- Edited by: Barbara Tulliver
- Music by: Stephen Endelman
- Production company: Sony Pictures Classics
- Distributed by: Sony Pictures Classics
- Release dates: April 7, 2008 (Los Angeles); May 9, 2008 (United States)
- Running time: 100 minutes
- Country: United States
- Language: English
- Budget: $7 million
- Box office: $2.7 million

Redbelt is a 2008 American martial arts film written and directed by David Mamet and starring Chiwetel Ejiofor, Tim Allen, Alice Braga, Randy Couture, Ricky Jay, Joe Mantegna, Emily Mortimer, David Paymer, Rebecca Pidgeon, and Rodrigo Santoro. The film also features a number of martial arts professionals. It opened in wide release in the United States and Canada on May 9, 2008. The film centers on a martial arts master who struggles to achieve financial stability without compromising on his strict set of morals and must determine if the latest opportunities in his career are too good to be true.

As of 2026, Redbelt remains Allen's only non-comedic role to date, not counting a cameo in Tropical Snow.

== Plot ==
One evening, at his Brazilian Jiu-Jitsu studio, martial arts teacher Mike Terry is approached by attorney Laura Black, who accidentally sideswiped his car. Policeman Joe Collins, one of Mike's students, sees that Laura is distressed and tries to take her coat. Startled, she grabs Joe's gun, and it goes off, shattering the studio's front window. To avoid having Laura charged with attempted murder, Mike and Joe agree to conceal the event.

Mike's insurance company does not cover "acts of god" and so refuses to pay for the windows repair. Mike's wife Sondra, who works in fashion and resents having to keep the struggling studio afloat, demands he ask for a loan from her brother Ricardo, a mixed martial arts champion. At Ricardo's nightclub, Sondra's other brother, Bruno, says Mike should fight on the undercard of an upcoming match between Ricardo and Japanese legend Morisaki, which could potentially pay out $50,000. Mike refuses, as he believes competitions are not honorable and weaken the fighter.

Meanwhile, aging Hollywood action star Chet Frank enters the nightclub without security and drunkenly starts a fight with another patron. Mike saves Chet with his impressive fighting abilities. The following day, Mike receives an expensive watch from Chet. Mike gives the watch to Joe, knowing he has financial issues. At a dinner party, Chet's wife Zena arranges an informal business deal to buy a large number of dresses from Sondra's company. Meanwhile, Mike explains his unique training method to Chet's business associate Jerry Weiss. Before a sparring match, each fighter must draw one of three marbles, two white and one black; whoever draws a black marble has to fight with a handicap.

Mike later helps Chet prepare for a film role and is offered the role of co-producer. That evening, Mike faxes the details of his training methods to Jerry so they can be used in the film. Joe then informs Mike that he was suspended from duty for pawning the watch, which turned out to be stolen. Mike later relays the information to Jerry, who leaves without giving an explanation. Zena also decides to cut off contact with Sondra, who had already borrowed $30,000 from a loan shark to order fabric for the dresses. The couple then learns that Bruno and Marty Brown are using Mike's marble-drawing method as a promotional gimmick for their fighting competition.

Mike hires Laura to sue, but Marty's lawyer threatens that if they do not drop the lawsuit, he will give the police proof that she broke the window attempting to kill Joe. He also has proof incriminating Mike and Joe of covering it up. Feeling responsible for what happened, Joe kills himself. Mike feels obligated to help Joe's financially struggling wife and, in desperate need of money himself, agrees to compete as an undercard fighter in the upcoming competition.

At the arena, Mike discovers the fights are being fixed: the white and black marbles are not selected at random. Unbeknownst to the competitors, this is done by Marty, Jerry and Bruno to ensure winning bets. Mike also learns that Sondra is the one who told them about Laura shooting the window, having become fed up with his putting honor before providing for his family.

Mike is disgusted by the way in which the group is dishonoring the sport, especially when he learns the Professor, an elderly martial arts master, is in the crowd. Mike decides to leave the tournament and let things be, but Laura convinces him to act. Mike re-enters the arena and fights his way through several security guards. He is then confronted by Ricardo, and their fight draws the attention of everyone there. Mike manages to choke Ricardo unconscious. As a sign of respect, Morisaki offers Mike his ivory-studded belt, previously referred to as a Japanese national treasure. Mike is then approached by the Professor himself, who proceeds to award him the coveted red belt. He then embraces him, acknowledging his dedication to the art.

== Cast ==
- Chiwetel Ejiofor as Mike Terry
- Tim Allen as Chet Frank
- Alice Braga as Sondra Terry
- Jose Pablo Cantillo as Snowflake
- Randy Couture as Dylan Flynn
- Ricky Jay as Marty Brown
- Joe Mantegna as Jerry Weiss
- Max Martini as Joe Collins
- Emily Mortimer as Laura Black
- David Paymer as Richie
- Rebecca Pidgeon as Zena Frank
- Rodrigo Santoro as Bruno Silva
- Jennifer Grey as Lucy Weiss
- Vincent Guastaferro as Eddie Bialy
- John Machado as Ricardo Silva
- Matt Malloy as Lawyer
- Ray Mancini as George
- Cathy Cahlin Ryan as Gini Collins
- Caroline de Souza Correa as Monica
- Mike Goldberg as Sports Announcer #2
- Damon Herriman as Official
- Dan Inosanto as Joao Moro (The Professor)
- Enson Inoue as Taketa Morisaki
- Cyril Takayama as Jimmy Takata
- Jake Johnson as Guayabera Shirt Man
- Ed O'Neill as Hollywood Producer

== Production ==
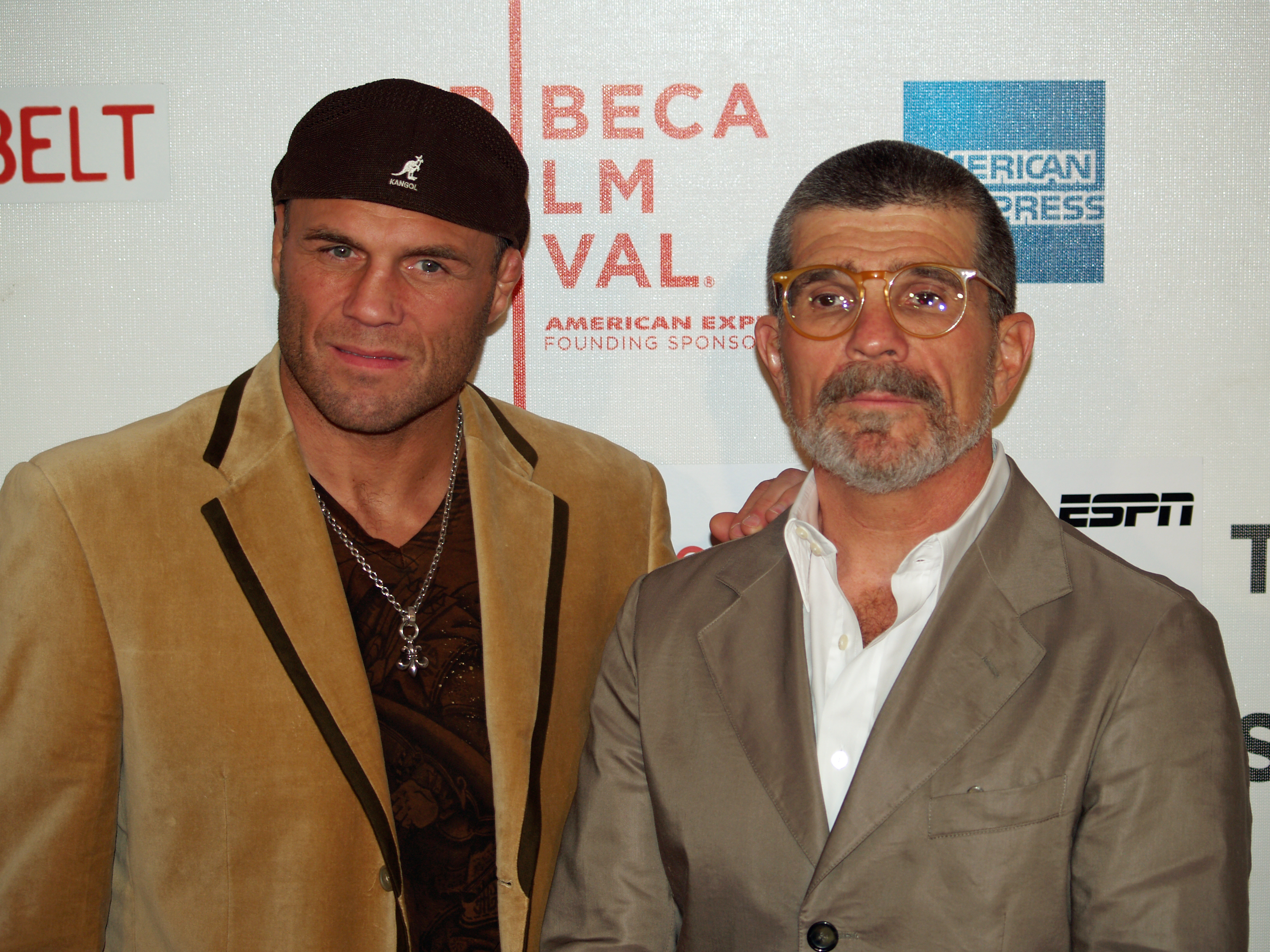
Randy Couture and David Mamet at the premiere of Redbelt at the 2008 Tribeca Film Festival

Mamet has described Redbelt as a samurai film in the tradition of Kurosawa. He has employed the resources of several members of the MMA community in the making of the film. Randy Couture and Enson Inoue have acting roles, as does Jean Jacques Machado's brother John Machado, who also planned some of the fight choreography. Dan Inosanto also has an acting role.

Mamet has earned the rank of purple belt under the tutelage of Renato Magno, who served as the film's jiu-jitsu consultant.

The film was produced by Chrisann Verges. David Wasco served as production designer. Debra McGuire designed the costumes and Stephen Endelman provided the music. Cinematography was done by Robert Elswit and the film was edited by Barbara Tulliver. John Machado and Rico Chiapparelli were the fight choreographers. Chiwetel Ejiofor's stunt double was Aaron Toney and Tim Allen's stunt double was Todd Warren.

In an interview with Iain Blair of Reuters Life!, Mamet said he was interested in casting Ejiofor for his acting versatility after seeing his performances in Dirty Pretty Things and Kinky Boots, saying, "It's impossible for one guy to be able to play both those parts." Mamet said that Ejiofor's preparation for the film included 12-hour days of physical training, although Ejiofor said that was not exactly the norm. Production began around July 2007, with many of the action sequences being filmed at the Pyramid in Long Beach.

== Marketing ==
Sony Pictures Classics co-founder and co-president Tom Bernard said there were two marketing campaigns for the film, "one directed at MMA guys and another at the more upscale theaters." Commercials and giveaway contests were run on Spike TV, and Mamet was invited to screen the film for members of New York's Lincoln Center.

== Reception ==
Review aggregation website Rotten Tomatoes gives the film an approval rating of 67% based on reviews from 144 critics, with an average rating of 6.31/10. The site's critics consensus reads: "Mamet's mixed marital [sic] arts morality play weaves between action and intellect but doesn't always hit its target." Metacritic reported the film had an average score of 69 out of 100, based on 32 critics, indicating "generally favorable reviews".

Many critics praised Chiwetel Ejiofor for his performance in the film. For Entertainment Weekly, Stephen King wrote that Ejiofor "brings gravity and grace to Terry's moral dilemma."

Los Angeles Times film critic Carina Chocano described the film as "tricky and engrossing" and "a contemporary noir with a samurai movie interior." Chocano wrote, "Ejiofor brings a calm magnetism and a beatific serenity to his roles that have the effect of knocking you flat -- there's something about this guy that's messianic." While citing Tim Allen's performance as restrained, Chocano wrote "the noir puzzle element is central to the story" and "suffice it to say things get complicated," saying "much of the pleasure is in the surprises."

Several critics called the story reminiscent of films from earlier decades. Ruthe Stein of the San Francisco Chronicle said the film is "entertaining in a pulpy kind of way, like the fight films of the 1930s and '40s, and more accessible than most of Mamet's movies." Ty Burr of The Boston Globe wrote "What Redbelt reminded me of more than anything else was a modern version of a classic film noir, particularly 1950's brilliantly seedy Night and the City, with its pro-wrestling subplot." Manohla Dargis of The New York Times called it "a satisfying, unexpectedly involving B-movie that owes as much to old Hollywood as to Greek tragedy."

The ending of the film was criticized by several critics. Tasha Robinson of The A.V. Club said "The film unravels a bit in the last few moments, amid unanswered story questions and a simplistic climax, but until that moment, Redbelt is Mamet's richest film of the decade." Steven Rea of The Philadelphia Inquirer said "One of the problems with the way Mamet resolves Mike's predicament is that it's ridiculously implausible - even in the context of a far-fetched fight story." Andrew O'Hehir of Salon.com said the final scene "might seem far-fetched on a pay-per-view MMA broadcast." Film critic James Berardinelli said "The plot is borderline ridiculous and certainly doesn't stand up to close (or even not-so-close) scrutiny, but there's a level of entertainment to be had watching it unfold in all its strangeness," but also said "taken at face value, there's a degree of satisfaction in the way Redbelt concludes."

Regarding the fight scenes in the film, Rea wrote "Mamet is a master of talk, not action" and said "Redbelt's ultimate Ultimate Fight moment feels sorely lacking." O'Hehir said "the jiu-jitsu scenes are so incoherently shot and edited you can't tell if the fight choreography is any good or not." Berardinelli wrote "Anyone attending with the expectation that this is going to satisfy a primal desire for wall-to-wall combat will be sadly disappointed.

In The Weekly Standard, Sonny Bunch wrote that the film's "heart is not in the twists and turns [...] but a careful character study of a man who lives a life based on honor, and the corrupting influence of money." Bunch said it "takes lack of exposition to a new extreme [...] How does Mamet tell us about Terry's character? Very subtly. Throughout the film we get hints about Terry's life [...] Mamet challenges us to figure out for ourselves what's going on in Terry's head."

The film appeared on some critics' top ten lists of the best films of 2008. Tasha Robinson of The A.V. Club named it the 4th best film of 2008, and Mike Russell of the Portland Oregonian named it the 9th best film of 2008.

== Box office performance ==
The film opened in limited release in the United States on May 2, 2008 and grossed $63,361 in 6 theaters, averaging $10,560 per theater. On May 9, 2008, the film opened in wide release in the United States and Canada, and grossed $1,012,435 in 1,379 theaters, ranking #11 at the box office and averaging $734 per theater. It grossed $2.7 million worldwide against a $7 million budget.
