= List of American plays =

This is a list of American plays:

== 0-9 ==
- $1200 a Year: A Comedy in Three Acts (1920), by Edna Ferber and Newman Levy
- 45 Seconds from Broadway (2001), by Neil Simon
- 8 (2011), by Dustin Lance Black

== A ==
- A-Haunting We Will Go (1981), by Tim Kelly
- The Accomplices (2007), by Bernard Weinraub
- A Counterfeit Presentment (1877), by William Dean Howells
- A Delicate Balance (1966), by Edward Albee
- A Streetcar Named Desire (1947), by Tennessee Williams
- A Memory of Two Mondays (1955), by Arthur Miller
- A View from the Bridge (1955), by Arthur Miller
- Abe Lincoln in Illinois (1938), by Robert E. Sherwood
- The Adding Machine (1923), by Elmer Rice
- After the Fall (1964), by Arthur Miller
- Agnes of God (1979), by John Pielmeier
- The Aliens (2010), by Annie Baker
- All Because of Agatha (1964), by Jonathan Troy
- All My Sons (1947), by Arthur Miller
- All New People (2011), by Zach Braff
- All Summer Long (1953), by Robert Anderson
- All the Way (2012), by Robert Schenkkan
- All the Way Home (1960), by Tad Mosel
- American Buffalo (1975), by David Mamet
- The American Clock (1980), by Arthur Miller
- The American Dream (1961), by Edward Albee
- The American Way (2011), by Jim Beaver
- The Anarchist (2012), by David Mamet
- And Still I Rise (1978), by Maya Angelou
- André (1798), by William Dunlap
- Anna Christie (1921), by Eugene O'Neill
- Anne of the Thousand Days (1948), by Maxwell Anderson
- And Things That Go Bump in the Night (1964), by Terrence McNally
- Angels in America (1991), by Tony Kushner
- Arsenic and Old Lace (1939), by Joseph Kesselring
- Appropriate (2014)- Brandon Jacob-Jenkins
- As You Like It, or Anything You Want To, Also Known as Rotterdam and Parmesan Are Dead (1975), by Jim Beaver
- Aunt Bam's Place (2011), by Tyler Perry
- Avanti! (1968), by Samuel A. Taylor
- Awake and Sing! (1935), by Clifford Odets

== B ==
- Bad Habits (1974), by Terrence McNally
- Barefoot in the Park (1963), by Neil Simon
- Battle of Angels (1940) (rewritten in 1957 as Orpheus Descending), by Tennessee Williams
- Beekman Place (1964), by Samuel A. Taylor
- The Best Man (1960), by Gore Vidal
- Beyond the Horizon (1918), by Eugene O'Neill
- Biloxi Blues (1984), by Neil Simon
- Black Bart and the Sacred Hills (1977), by August Wilson
- Black Nativity (1961), by Langston Hughes
- The Blue Hour (1979), by David Mamet
- Bobbi Boland (2001), by Nancy Hasty
- Bobby Gould in Hell (1989), by David Mamet
- Born Yesterday (1946), by Garson Kanin
- Boston Marriage (1999), by David Mamet
- Botticelli (1968), by Terrence McNally
- The Boys in the Band (1968), by Mart Crowley
- Bride of Brackenloch (1987), by Rick Abbot
- A Bright Room Called Day (1987), by Tony Kushner
- Brighton Beach Memoirs (1982), by Neil Simon
- Bringing It All Back Home (1969), by Terrence McNally
- Broadway Bound (1986), by Neil Simon
- Broken Glass (1994), by Arthur Miller
- A Bronx Tale (1988), by Chazz Palminteri
- Bullets Over Broadway (2014), by Woody Allen
- Bus Stop (1955), by William Inge
- By the Sea, By the Sea, By the Beautiful Sea (1995), by Terrence McNally, Lanford Wilson, and Joe Pintauro

== C ==
- Cafe Crown (1942), by Hy Kraft
- California Suite (1976), by Neil Simon
- Candle in the Wind (1941), by Maxwell Anderson
- Candles to the Sun (1936), by Tennessee Williams
- Cat on a Hot Tin Roof (1955), by Tennessee Williams
- Cat O'Nine Tails (1927) by Lawrence Worcester
- Cardboard Piano (2016) by Hansol Jung
- Chapter Two (1977), by Neil Simon
- Children of a Lesser God (1979), by Mark Medoff
- China Doll (2015), by David Mamet
- Choir Boy (2013), by Tarell Alvin McCraney
- The Christians (2015), by Lucas Hnath
- The Cocktail Party (1949), by T.S. Eliot
- The Coldest Day of the Year (1989), by August Wilson
- Come Back, Little Sheba (1950), by William Inge
- Come Back to the Five and Dime, Jimmy Dean, Jimmy Dean (1976), by Ed Graczyk
- Come Blow Your Horn (1961), by Neil Simon
- Come on Strong (1962), by Garson Kanin
- The Confidential Clerk (1954), by T.S. Eliot
- The Cop and the Anthem (1973), by Jim Beaver
- Corpus Christi (1998), by Terrence McNally
- The Creation of the World and Other Business (1972), by Arthur Miller
- The Crucible (1953), by Arthur Miller
- The Cryptogram (1994), by David Mamet

== D ==
- Daddy's Dyin' (Who's Got The Will?) (1987), Del Shores
- Dana H. (2019), by Lucas Hnath
- The Dark at the Top of the Stairs (1957), by William Inge
- Death (1975), by Woody Allen
- Death of a Salesman (1949), by Arthur Miller
- The Death of Bessie Smith (1960), by Edward Albee
- Death Tax (2012), by Lucas Hnath
- Decade (2011), by Tony Kushner
- Dedication or The Stuff of Dreams (2005), by Terrence McNally
- Desire Under the Elms (1924), by Eugene O'Neill
- Deuce (2007), by Terrence McNally
- Diary of a Mad Black Woman (2001), by Tyler Perry
- Dinner at Eight (1932), by Edna Ferber and George S. Kaufman
- The Dinner Party (1999), by Neil Simon
- Dirty Blonde (2000), by Claudia Shear
- Does a Tiger Wear a Necktie? (1969), by Don Petersen
- A Doll's House, Part 2 (2017), by Lucas Hnath
- Don't Drink the Water (1967), by Woody Allen
- Don't Go Away Mad (1947), by William Saroyan
- Don't You Want to Be Free? (1938), by Langston Hughes
- Dream Girl (1945), by Elmer Rice
- The Duck Variations (1972), by David Mamet

== E ==
- Edmond (1982), by David Mamet
- The Egotist (1922), by Ben Hecht
- The Elder Statesman (1958), by T.S. Eliot
- The Elephant Man (1977), by Bernard Pomerance
- Elmer and Lily (1939), by William Saroyan
- Emma (1976), by Howard Zinn
- The Emperor Jones (1920), by Eugene O'Neill
- Emperor of Haiti (1936), by Langston Hughes

== F ==
- Faith of Our Fathers (1950), by Paul Eliot Green
- The Family Reunion (1939), by T.S. Eliot
- Faustus (2004), by David Mamet
- The Feast of Ortolans (1937), by Maxwell Anderson
- Fences (1985), by August Wilson
- A Few Good Men (1989), by Aaron Sorkin
- The Fifth Column (1938), by Ernest Hemingway
- Finishing the Picture (2004), by Arthur Miller
- First Love (1961), by Samuel A. Taylor
- The Floating Light Bulb (1981), by Woody Allen
- The Flying Machine: A One-Act Play for Three Men (1953), by Ray Bradbury
- Fools (1981), by Neil Simon
- Fortitude (1968), by Kurt Vonnegut
- Frankie and Johnny in the Clair de Lune (1982), by Terrence McNally
- The Frog Prince (1982), by David Mamet
- The Front Page (1928), by Ben Hecht and Charles MacArthur
- Fugitive Kind (1937), by Tennessee Williams
- Fullerton Street (1980), by August Wilson

== G ==
- G. David Schine in Hell (1996), by Tony Kushner
- Gary: A Sequel to Titus Andronicus (2019), by Taylor Mac
- Gem of the Ocean (2003), by August Wilson
- Getting Out (1979), by Marsha Norman
- The Gingerbread Lady (1970), by Neil Simon
- The Glass Menagerie (1944), by Tennessee Williams
- Glengarry Glen Ross (1983), by David Mamet
- God (1975), by Woody Allen
- God's Favorite (1974), by Neil Simon
- Gods of the Lightning (1929), by Maxwell Anderson and Harold Hickerson
- The Golden Years (1940), by Arthur Miller
- The Good Doctor (1973), by Neil Simon
- The Great Disobedience (1938), by Arthur Miller
- The Great God Brown (1926), by Eugene O'Neill
- The Grass Still Grows (1938), by Arthur Miller
- Gypsy (1929), by Maxwell Anderson

== H ==
- The Hairy Ape (1922), by Eugene O'Neill
- The Half-Bridge (1943), by Arthur Miller
- Happy Birthday, Wanda June (1960), by Kurt Vonnegut
- The Happy Time (1951), by Samuel A. Taylor
- Harvey (1944), by Mary Chase
- The Haves and the Have Nots (2012), by Tyler Perry
- The Heiress (1947), by Ruth Goetz and Augustus Goetz
- Hell Hath No Fury Like a Woman Scorned (2014), by Tyler Perry
- Hello Out There (1941), by William Saroyan
- Hidden Agendas (1994), by Terrence McNally
- High Tor (1937), by Maxwell Anderson
- Hillary and Clinton (2016), by Lucas Hnath
- Homebody/Kabul (2001), by Tony Kushner
- The Homecoming (1989), by August Wilson
- Honors at Dawn (1938), by Arthur Miller
- How I Learned What I Learned (2002), by August Wilson

== I ==
- I Can Do Bad All by Myself (1999), by Tyler Perry
- I Know I've Been Changed (1998), by Tyler Perry
- I Never Sang for My Father (1968), by Robert Anderson
- I Ought to Be in Pictures (1979), by Neil Simon
- I Think About You a Great Deal (1986), by Arthur Miller
- The Iceman Cometh (1939), by Eugene O'Neill
- In Abraham's Bosom (1927), by Paul Eliot Green
- Incident at Vichy (1964), by Arthur Miller
- Infinite Life (2023), by Annie Baker
- The Inheritance (2018), by Matthew Lopez
- The Intelligent Homosexual's Guide to Capitalism and Socialism with a Key to the Scriptures (2009), by Tony Kushner
- Isaac's Eye (2013), by Lucas Hnath
- It's Only a Play (1986), by Terrence McNally

== J ==
- Jake's Women (1992), by Neil Simon
- Jerico-Jim Crow (1964), by Langston Hughes
- Jim Dandy (1947), by William Saroyan
- Jitney (1982), by August Wilson
- Joe Turner's Come and Gone (1984), by August Wilson

== K ==
- Keep Your Pantheon (2007), by David Mamet
- Key Largo (1939), by Maxwell Anderson
- King Hedley II (1999), by August Wilson
- Knickerbocker Holiday (1938), by Maxwell Anderson

== L ==
- Ladies and Gentlemen (1939), by Ben Hecht and Charles MacArthur
- Lady Day at Emerson's Bar and Grill (1986), by Lanie Robertson
- Lakeboat (1970), by David Mamet
- The Last Act Is a Solo (1991), by Robert Anderson
- Last of the Red Hot Lovers (1969), by Neil Simon
- The Last Pad (1973), by William Inge
- The Last Yankee (1991), by Arthur Miller
- Laugh to Keep from Crying (2009), by Tyler Perry
- Laughter on the 23rd Floor (1993), by Neil Simon
- The Leather Apron Club (2016), by Charlie Mount
- Legend (1976), by Samuel A. Taylor
- Lettering (2013), by Jim Beaver
- A Life in the Theatre (1977), by David Mamet
- Lips Together, Teeth Apart (1991), by Terrence McNally
- The Lisbon Traviata (1989), by Terrence McNally
- Listen My Children (1939), by Arthur Miller and Norman Rosten
- Little Ham (1936), by Langston Hughes
- The Live Wire (1950), by Garson Kanin
- Lobby Hero (2001), by Kenneth Lonergan
- London Suite (1994), by Neil Simon
- Lone Canoe (1972), by David Mamet
- Long Day's Journey Into Night (1956), by Eugene O'Neill
- A Loss of Roses (1959), by William Inge
- The Lost Colony (1937), by Paul Eliot Green
- Lost in Yonkers (1990), by Neil Simon
- Love! Valour! Compassion! (1994), by Terrence McNally

== M ==
- M. Butterfly (1988), by David Henry Hwang
- Mary's Birthday (1854) by George Henry Miles
- Ma Rainey's Black Bottom (1982), by August Wilson
- A Madea Christmas (2011), by Tyler Perry
- Madea's Class Reunion (2003), by Tyler Perry
- Madea's Family Reunion (2002), by Tyler Perry
- Madea Gets a Job (2012), by Tyler Perry
- Madea Goes to Jail (2006), by Tyler Perry
- Madea's Big Happy Family (2010), by Tyler Perry
- Madea's Neighbors from Hell (2014), by Tyler Perry
- The Maid of Arran (1882), by L. Frank Baum
- The Man Who Came to Dinner (1939), by George S. Kaufman and Moss Hart
- The Man Who Had All the Luck (1940), by Arthur Miller
- The Marriage Counselor (2008), by Tyler Perry
- Master Class (1995), by Terrence McNally
- The Masque of Kings (1936), by Maxwell Anderson
- Mary of Scotland (1933), by Maxwell Anderson
- The Meadow (1947), by Ray Bradbury
- Meet the Browns (2005), by Tyler Perry
- Mockingbird (2003), by Jim Beaver
- The Monkey Jar (2008), by Richard Martin Hirsch
- Mourning Becomes Electra (1931), by Eugene O'Neill
- Mr. Happiness (1978), by David Mamet
- Mr Peters' Connections (1998), by Arthur Miller
- Mule Bone (1931), by Langston Hughes and Zora Neale Hurston
- Murder in the Cathedral (1935), by T.S. Eliot
- My Heart's in the Highlands] (1940), by William Saroyan

== N ==
- Natural Affection (1963), by William Inge
- Next (1969), by Terrence McNally
- 'night, Mother (1983), by Marsha Norman
- The Night of the Iguana (1961), by Tennessee Williams
- Night Over Taos (1932), by Maxwell Anderson
- Night Riders (2006), by Jim Beaver
- Nina (1951), by Samuel A. Taylor
- No Villain (1936), by Arthur Miller
- Noel Corson's Oath (1899) by Verna M. Raynor
- Noon (1968), second segment of Morning, Noon and Night, by Terrence McNally
- November (2008), by David Mamet

== O ==
- The Odd Couple (1965), by Neil Simon
- The Old Neighborhood (1997), by David Mamet
- Oleanna (1992), by David Mamet
- On Golden Pond (1979), by Ernest Thompson
- Once Upon a Single Bound (1974), by Jim Beaver
- One Night in Miami (2013), by Kemp Powers
- Opheliamachine (2013/2024), by Magda Romanska
- The Originalist (2015), by John Strand
- Otho: a Tragedy, in Five Acts (1819), by John Neal
- Our Ephraim, or The New Englanders, A What-d’ye-call-it?–in three Acts (1835), by John Neal
- Our Mrs. McChesney (1915), by Edna Ferber and George V. Hobart
- Our Town (1938), by Thornton Wilder
- Outside Looking In (1925), by Maxwell Anderson
- The Ox-Bow Incident (1976), adapted by Jim Beaver

== P ==
- The Parsley Garden (1992), by William Saroyan
- The Penitent (2017), by David Mamet
- Period of Adjustment (1960), by Tennessee Williams
- Peter and the Starcatcher (2009), by Rick Elice
- The Petrified Forest (1935), by Robert E. Sherwood
- The Piano Lesson (1987), by August Wilson
- Picnic (1953), by William Inge
- Pillar of Fire and Other Plays (1975), by Ray Bradbury
- Play It Again, Sam (1969), by Woody Allen
- Plaza Suite (1968), by Neil Simon
- The Pleasure of His Company (1958), by Samuel A. Taylor
- The Poet & the Rent (1986), by David Mamet
- POTUS: Or, Behind Every Great Dumbass Are Seven Women Trying to Keep Him Alive (2022), by Selina Fillinger
- Prairie du Chien (1979), by David Mamet
- Prelude and Liebestod (1989), by Terrence McNally
- Pressing Engagements (1990), by Jim Beaver
- The Price (1968), by Arthur Miller
- The Prince of Parthia (1765), by Thomas Godfrey
- The Prisoner of Second Avenue (1971), by Neil Simon
- Proposals (1997), by Neil Simon
- A Public Reading of an Unproduced Screenplay About the Death of Walt Disney (2013), by Lucas Hnath

== R ==
- Race (2009), by David Mamet
- Radio Golf (2003), by August Wilson
- A Raisin in the Sun (1959), by Lorraine Hansberry
- The Rat Race (1949), by Garson Kanin
- Recycle (1973), by August Wilson
- Red Speedo (2013), by Lucas Hnath
- Resurrection Blues (2002), by Arthur Miller
- Reunion (1976), by David Mamet
- The Revenge of the Space Pandas, or Binky Rudich and the Two-Speed Clock (1978), by David Mamet
- The Ride Down Mt. Morgan (1991), by Arthur Miller
- The Ritz (1975), by Terrence McNally
- The Rock (1934), by T.S. Eliot
- Romance (2005), by David Mamet
- Rose's Dilemma (2003), by Neil Simon
- The Royal Family (1927), by Edna Ferber and George S. Kaufman
- Rumors (1988), by Neil Simon

== S ==
- Sabrina Fair (1953), by Samuel A. Taylor
- Saturday's Children (1927), by Maxwell Anderson
- School (2009), by David Mamet
- School Girls; Or, the African Mean Girls Play (2017), by Jocelyn Bioh
- Schooling Giacomo (2008), by Richard Knipe
- Second Overture (1938), by Maxwell Anderson
- Semper Fi (1982), by Jim Beaver
- Seven Guitars (1995), by August Wilson
- Sexual Perversity in Chicago (1974), by David Mamet
- The Shawl (1985), by David Mamet
- Sidekick (1981), by Jim Beaver
- The Sign in Sidney Brustein's Window (1964), by Lorraine Hansberry
- Silent Night, Lonely Night (1959), by Robert Anderson
- Simply Heavenly (1957), by Langston Hughes
- The Slaughter of the Innocents (1952), by William Saroyan
- Slavs! (1994), by Tony Kushner
- The Smile of the World (1949), by Garson Kanin
- Solitaire/Double Solitaire (1970), by Robert Anderson
- Some Men (2006), by Terrence McNally
- Something Cloudy, Something Clear (1981), by Tennessee Williams
- Spades (1980), by Jim Beaver
- Speed-the-Plow (1988), by David Mamet
- Squirrels (1974), by David Mamet
- Stage Door (1926), by Edna Ferber and George S. Kaufman
- The Star-Spangled Girl (1966), by Neil Simon
- Starstruck (1980), by Elaine Lee
- The Stendhal Syndrome (2004), by Terrence McNally
- The Stolen Secret (1954), by William Saroyan
- Street Scene (1929), by Elmer Rice
- A Streetcar Named Desire (1947), by Tennessee Williams
- The Subject Was Roses (1964), by Frank D. Gilroy
- Subway Circus (1940), by William Saroyan
- Summer and Smoke (1948), by Tennessee Williams
- Summer Brave (1962), by William Inge
- The Sunshine Boys (1972), by Neil Simon
- The Sleeping Car (1883), by William Dean Howells
- The Star-Wagon (1937), by Maxwell Anderson
- Sweeney Agonistes (publicată 1926, jucată 1934), by T.S. Eliot
- Sweet Bird of Youth (1959), by Tennessee Williams
- Sweetbrier; or the Flower Girl of New York (1889), by Lizzie May Elwyn
- Sweet Eros (1968), by Terrence McNally

== T ==
- Talking to You (1942), by William Saroyan
- Tambourines to Glory (1956), by Langston Hughes
- Tammy Faye's Final Audition (2015), by Merri Biechler
- Tea and Sympathy (1953), by Robert Anderson
- A Teaspoon Every Four Hours (1969), by Jackie Mason and Mike Mortman
- That Championship Season (1972), by Jason Miller
- There's Wisdom in Women (1935), by Joseph Kesselring
- They Too Arise (1937), by Arthur Miller
- They're Made Out of Meat (1991), by Terry Bisson
- This Is Our Youth (1996), by Kenneth Lonergan
- The Time of Your Life (1939), by William Saroyan
- To Kill a Mockingbird (2018), by Aaron Sorkin
- Torch Song Trilogy (1982), by Harvey Fierstein
- The Trip to Bountiful (1953), by Horton Foote
- Troubled Island (1936), by Langston Hughes and William Grant Still
- Truth, Justice, and the Texican Way (1986), by Jim Beaver
- Twentieth Century (1932), by Ben Hecht and Charles MacArthur
- Two for the Seesaw (1958), by William Gibson
- Two Trains Running (1990), by August Wilson

== U ==
- Under the Gaslight (1867), by Augustin Daly

== V ==
- Valley Forge (1934), by Maxwell Anderson
- Van Zorn (1914), by Edwin Arlington Robinson
- Vanya and Sonia and Masha and Spike (2012), by Christopher Durang
- Verdigris (1985), by Jim Beaver
- The Very First Christmas Morning (1962), by Kurt Vonnegut
- The Vikings and Darwin (2008), by David Mamet
- Visit to a Small Planet (1957), by Gore Vidal
- Visiting Mr. Green (1996), by Jeff Baron

== W ==
- The Water Engine (1976), by David Mamet
- The Waverly Gallery (2000), by Kenneth Lonergan
- Weekend (1968), by Gore Vidal
- The West Side Waltz (1981), by Ernest Thompson
- What Price Glory (1924), by Maxwell Anderson and Laurence Stallings
- What's Done in the Dark (2007), by Tyler Perry
- Where Has Tommy Flowers Gone? (1971), by Terrence McNally
- Where's Daddy? (1966), by William Inge
- Whigs, Pigs, and Greyhounds (2011), by Jim Beaver
- Whiskey (1973), by Terrence McNally
- White Desert (1923), by Maxwell Anderson
- Who's Afraid of Virginia Woolf? (1962), by Edward Albee
- Why Did I Get Married? (2004), by Tyler Perry
- The Wingless Victory (1936), by Maxwell Anderson
- Winterset (1935), by Maxwell Anderson
- The Wonderful Ice Cream Suit and Other Plays (1972), by Ray Bradbury
- Why We Have a Body (1993), by Claire Chafee

== Y ==
- You Can't Take It with You (1936), by George S. Kaufman and Moss Hart
- You Know I Can't Hear You When the Water's Running (1967), by Robert Anderson
- You're Welcome America (2009), by Will Ferrell

== Z ==
- Zero Hour (2006), by Jim Brochu
- Zorro in Hell (2006), by Richard Montoya, Ric Salinas and Herbert Siguenza
- The Zoo Story (1959), by Edward Albee

== See also ==
- List of American playwrights
- Theater of the United States
- Broadway theatre
- List of one-act plays by Tennessee Williams
- Plays of L. Frank Baum
- List of German plays
