= Honors at Dawn =

Play written by Arthur Miller

Honors at Dawn, written in 1936, is Arthur Miller's second play (after No Villain /They Too Arise), for which he won a second Avery Hopwood Award. It was written at the University of Michigan, in Ann Arbor, Michigan.
