= Cat o' nine tails (disambiguation) =

The cat o' nine tails is a type of multi-tailed whip.

Cat o' nine tails may also refer to:

== Literature ==
- Cat O'Nine Tails (novel), a 2007 novel by Julia Golding
- Cat O'Nine Tails, a 1972 novel by Paul Gillette
- Cat O'Nine Tails (play), a 1927 three-act mystery play by Lawrence Worcester

== Other uses ==
- Typha latifolia, a perennial herbaceous plant commonly named "cat-o'-nine-tails"
- The Cat o' Nine Tails, a 1971 Italian film
- Cat O' 9 Tails, an enemy in the 1995 video game Donkey Kong Country 2
- "Cat O' Nine Tails", a song by John Zorn from the 1999 album The String Quartets

== See also ==
- Cat O'Nine Tales, a 2006 short story collection by Jeffrey Archer
- Cat of Many Tails, a 1949 novel by Ellery Queen
