= Crazy Sexy Cancer =

- Directed by: Kris Carr
- Written by: Kris Carr
- Produced by: Kris Carr, Brian Fassett, Beth Nathanson
- Edited by: Marc Senter
- Release date: March 11, 2007 (USA)
- Running time: 89 minutes
- Country: United States
- Language: English

Crazy Sexy Cancer is a documentary film by actress and photographer Kris Carr. It premiered on March 11, 2007, at South by Southwest (SXSW) Film Festival and aired on TLC on August 29, 2007. The film was edited by Pagan Harleman and Brian Fassett, with music composed by Matthew Puckett.

The documentary follows Carr’s experience after being diagnosed with epithelioid hemangioendothelioma (EHE), a rare form of cancer. Carr later authored two books, Crazy Sexy Cancer Tips and Crazy Sexy Cancer Survivor, based on her experiences.

== Plot summary ==
Crazy Sexy Cancer documents Kris Carr's personal experience with cancer. The film depicts Carr's journey after being diagnosed with epithelioid hemangioendothelioma (EHE). Initially believing her symptoms were related to an injury after a yoga class, Carr learns she has a rare form of cancer. Despite receiving a diagnosis indicating non-metastatic tumors and advice to "watch and wait," Carr decides to explore complementary treatment methods alongside conventional treatment. Her doctor recommends adopting a healthy diet and exercise regimen. Carr describes her resolve to "take that crumb and turn it into a cake." She begins by shopping for organic foods.

Carr consults various oncologists, including one who suggests a triple organ transplant of her lungs and liver, which Carr declines. She consults with Dr. George Demetri, director of the Center for Sarcoma and Bone Oncology at the Dana–Farber Cancer Institute in Boston.

To improve her immune system through diet and lifestyle changes, Carr adopts a vegan diet, stocking her refrigerator with foods such as "leafy greens, vegetables, sprouted grains, nuts, seeds, and every kind of juice possible, including tons of wheatgrass." She enrolls in a healing program at the Hippocrates Health Institute in West Palm Beach, Florida.

In addition to dietary changes, the film depicts Carr exploring various forms of alternative medicine, incorporating practices such as enemas, massages, and therapies like infrared saunas. She also consults a chiropractor and an acupuncturist. The film notes that yoga, which initially led Carr to seek medical attention, also becomes part of her process. The film depicts Carr incorporating spirituality into her approach to her illness. She visits a Zen Monastery and establishes a personal space for daily prayer, meditation, and gratitude. According to Carr in the film, she views cancer as her guru, suggesting one use the experience for spiritual growth, stating, "Cancer creates pandemonium."

In the film, Carr discusses the importance of a support system, which she refers to as a "cancer posse." The film also includes interviews with other young women with cancer, who share their experiences of living with the disease.
