= The Man Who Had All the Luck =

Play written by Arthur Miller

Poster for the 2002 Broadway revival

The Man Who Had All the Luck is a play by Arthur Miller, his second major play (after No Villain).

The Man Who Had All the Luck follows protagonist David Beeves’ existential exploration into the enigmatic question of how fate and the human will interact with each other. The play takes on a fantastical, parable-like architecture in its plot construction and character development as it follows Beeves into three and a half of the luckiest years of his life. The story begins during an evening in April at an undisclosed Midwestern town, evoking a feel of nostalgia and Americana in the process.

The Man Who Had All the Luck failed on Broadway, lasting only four performances. Afterwards, Miller wrote All My Sons as a final attempt at writing a commercially successful play; he had vowed to "find some other line of work" if the play did not find an audience.

== Plot ==
David Beeves is a young Midwestern automobile mechanic, who discovers he is blessed with what appears to be almost supernatural good fortune that allows him to overcome every seemingly insurmountable obstacle that crosses his path, while those around him fall in defeat. Like Midas, everything he touches is tinged with gold, leaving him to wonder if and when his luck will change, and he, too, will be forced to deal with life's tragedies, until he eventually realizes that his good heart, hard work, and quick thought have been responsible for his success far more than luck.

David Beeves works as a self-taught auto mechanic in a barn that doubles as a repair station, where the entire first act takes place. The scene unfolds as David tells J.B., a local shop owner, that he plans to confront his girlfriend Hester’s father about their intention to marry. This, of course, is not as easy as it seems; her father, Andrew Falk, has resented David for over seven years and still controls every aspect of Hester’s life. After receiving conflicting advice on how to mediate the situation from J.B., Hester, his father Pat, and Shory (a disabled veteran who manages the feed and grain store adjacent to the barn), a rich farm owner named Dan Dibble brings his Marmon over for repair after a competing mechanic informs him that the engine will have to be taken apart. J.B. then notes to David in secrecy that getting the Marmon to run properly might cement his place in the tractor business, despite David’s lack of prowess in tractor repair. David agrees to the job with brisk charm, though is filled with doubt about his ability to diagnose the Marmon properly.

Shortly thereafter, Mr. Falk arrives in a bitter frustration, ordering Hester to return home and confronting David Beeves directly. David, restraining himself from rash emotion and violence, bluntly tells Falk that Hester and he are marrying. Falk subsequently threatens to kill Beeves if he sees him again, and pushes his stalled car away. Only moments later, Dan Dibble returns with Hester, admitting in a stunned confession that he accidentally hit and killed her father with the front of his vehicle. David, feeling an ambivalent combination of sympathy for Hester, elation now that his obstacles have been removed, and a skeptical notion that what just happened was unreal, stays in the barn to work on the Marmon. As time presses on, Beeves gets progressively more tired and frustrated with his incompetence in diagnosing the Marmon’s mechanical issues. At the brink of his exhaustion, an Austrian mechanic named Gus enters the barn and offers to fix the Marmon at no charge while David rests. When he awakes in the morning, Gus has disappeared and Dibble has returned. Assuming that David was the one who repaired the automobile, Dibble promises to bring all of his tractors that need work done to David in the future, and guarantees the forming of other business connections along the way. In utter disbelief of his luck, David is unable to accept the money for restoring the Marmon.

The play resumes following a three-year lapse at the farmhouse David and Hester have inherited after Andrew Falk’s death. David’s close friends and family have gathered at the house, eagerly awaiting his brother Amos’s baseball game. Pat is later revealed to have received a telegram from Augie Belfast, a talent scout for the Detroit Tigers, notifying the family that he will be watching the game tonight specifically for Amos. After they return from the game, the crowd awaits Belfast’s arrival and the verdict on whether Amos has the skill to be drafted into the major league at the Beeves’ residence. During this brief interim, David decides to invest in a mink farm at the persuasion of Dan Dibble. Spirits are high within the group initially, but as time passes without any sign of Belfast, Beeves starts to doubt the value of man’s hard work and determination. When the man ultimately does show, he lauds Amos’s talent as a pitcher, but remarks that when the bases are loaded, he becomes panicky because he has been used to practicing in the cellar throughout his life. He leaves the house unwilling to make any sort of deal with Amos. Resentful and humiliated, Amos vows never to play baseball again, blames his father for his misfortunes, and discloses his envious feelings toward David’s fulfillment in life. Beeves tells him he is not fulfilled in life because of his perceived inability to have children, which spurs Hester to unexpectedly reveal that she is having a child.

Several months pass, and Hester has begun to enter labor as David, J.B., Shory, and Gus wait downstairs for the child to be born. Beeves tries to convince Gus to take over 60% of his business ventures so he can raise enough money to purchase more mink. Gus refuses on the basis that David could lose everything he owns if his mink perish, to which he replies that he has already mortgaged most of his assets. As things escalate into quarrel, David divulges that Hester has fallen and that the child could be delivered as a stillbirth or deformed. David is convinced that this catastrophe is his final payment for all of the luck that has pursued him throughout his recent life. Ironically, the child is born a healthy boy, and David continues to feel ashamed and guilty about his prosperity. A month later, Gus and Hester learn that Dan Dibble’s mink have all died after consuming contaminated feed; David uses the same feed for his own mink. Both decide to hold off on telling him; Gus fears that his psychological and emotional stability might come into jeopardy, and Hester believes that such a loss would eventually make him happy in the long run. Dibble eventually calls the house and informs David, who begins to chastise Hester. She makes the decision to leave him, the reasoning behind this misconstrued by David as Gus having an affair with his wife. Just as things come to an emotional climax, Dibble arrives and assuages their fears. David and he both realize that the careful monitoring of the feed has saved his mink. David has an epiphany after Gus points out that only Beeves’ hard work and meticulous caregiving could have saved the mink, not luck. He then departs. Hester asks David to come up for bed, and as thunder roars in the distance, he stares out the window with apprehension.

== Analysis ==
Christopher Bigsby states that this is a study of human freedom. Beyond offering an account of a man's decline into madness, and eventual redemption, it explores the degree to which many of the characters become complicit in their own irrelevance, the degree to which they collude in the idea of man as a victim, as a subject of cosmic ironies.

== Production history ==
The Man Who Had All The Luck originated as an unpublished novel manuscript, completed in 1943; Miller adapted it for the theater the following year and it became his first play to be staged on Broadway. Directed by Joseph Fields, it opened on November 23, 1944, at the Forrest Theatre, where it ran for only four performances. Karl Swenson starred as David Beeves.

The play's failure nearly derailed Miller's career, and it remained one of his least-known works until 1990, when the Bristol Old Vic staged The Man Who Had All The Luck with Iain Glen in the lead role. The production was directed by Paul Unwin. It later transferred to the Young Vic in London. In 2000, director Dan Fields mounted a production that ran for seven weeks at the Ivy Substation theater in Culver City, California. The following year, a production was staged by the Williamstown Theatre Festival, which had presented the American premiere of Miller's The Ride Down Mt. Morgan.

After 15 previews, a Broadway revival directed by Scott Ellis opened on May 1, 2002, at the American Airlines Theatre, where it ran for 62 performances. The cast included Chris O'Donnell as David Beeves, with Samantha Mathis, Mason Adams, James Rebhorn, Richard Riehle, David Wohl, and Sam Robards, whose performance garnered him Tony and Drama Desk Award nominations for Best Featured Actor in a Play.

In 2006, Ellis was announced to be directing a feature-film adaptation of the play.

The play was revived at the Donmar Warehouse, London, in March 2008 in a production by Sean Holmes.

On 25 September 2012, a UK-wide tour by Sell A Door Theatre Company, in association with Mull Theatre, started. The tour is directed by David Hutchinson and designed by Richard Evans. The tour took in the UK from Orkney Arts Theatre to Greenwich Theatre, London.
