= Homely Girl, A Life =

1992 Short stories book

First edition (publ. Viking Press)

Homely Girl: A Life is a 1992 collection of three short stories by Arthur Miller.

In Britain, the collection was published under the title Plain Girl.
