= Mr. Peters' Connections =

1998 play

Mr. Peters' Connections is a play by Arthur Miller. The title character is a former Pan Am pilot who worked for the airline in its glory days. He recalls flying into a thousand sunsets and bedding eighteen Rockettes in a month, eventually marrying one of them. Now he is an aging, befuddled man lost in a world he no longer understands.

== Overview ==
The serio-comic fantasy is set in an abandoned, dilapidated night club his wife Charlotte is encouraging him to buy. Peters' only interest in the place stems from its location near a shoe store that carries the extra narrow size he requires. Present are a homeless squatter named Adele (who acts as an occasional commentator) and Calvin, the owner of the property. Joining them are Larry, the shoe store proprietor who is searching for his missing wife Cathy Mae, two New Age emissaries – a young pregnant girl named Rose (who might be Peters' long-lost daughter) and her musician-composer friend Leonard, and Charlotte. The CurtainUp reviewer noted the "Pinteresque dialogue."

Miller, in a preface to the play, wrote that the set "should look like whatever the reader or producer imagines as a space where the living and dead may meet."

== Productions ==
Miller wrote the play specifically for the Off-Broadway Signature Theater Company, as playwright in residence, which staged it as the final offering of their 1997-98 season. The limited-run production, directed by Garry Hynes, opened on April 28, 1998 and ran until June 21. The cast included Peter Falk as Mr. Peters, Anne Jackson as Charlotte, Jeff Weiss as Calvin, Erica Bradshaw as Adele, Kris Carr as Cathy Mae, Daniel Oreskes as Larry, Alan Mozes as Leonard, and Tari Signor as Rose.

In his review in The New York Times, Ben Brantley described the play as "a numbing experience. The work is an example of the experimental, ruminative style the dramatist has adopted of late, an approach that is by no means his most effective . . . his recent exercises in abstraction have an oddly old-fashioned feeling . . . though Connections may portray a world of baffling ambiguity, the ways in which it does so tend to be blunt and even clumsy."

The play was produced at the Guthrie Theatre, Minneapolis, Minnesota, opening in November 1999 and directed by James Houghton.

The play opened in London at the Almeida Theatre on July 26, 2000. Directed by Michael Blakemore, John Cullum starred as Mr. Peters.
