= Jack Sharkey (writer) =

American writer

John Michael Sharkey (May 6, 1931 – September 28, 1992) was an American writer who published over eighty plays, many under pen names.

Sharkey was born in Chicago, Illinois, to John and Mary Sharkey. In the 1960s, he wrote articles for Playboy and edited the company magazine for Allstate Insurance. He began publishing science fiction stories in 1959 with "The Captain of His Soul", which appeared in Fantastic. Over his career, he published about fifty stories in science fiction magazines such as Galaxy Science Fiction.

Sharkey wrote plays under his own name and four pseudonyms: Rick Abbot, Mark Chandler, Monk Ferris, and Mike Johnson.

== Writing ==
Contact / Jerry Norcriss (Kurzgeschichtenserie)

- Arcturus Times Three (1961)
- Big Baby (1962)
- A Matter of Protocol (1962)
- The Creature Inside (1963)
- The Colony That Failed (1964)

=== Novels ===
- Murder, Maestro, Please (1960)
  - German: Mord und Musik : Kriminalroman. Übersetzt von Friedrich A. Sommer. Signum Taschenbücher #149, 1963.
- The Secret Martians (1960)
  - German: Die 15 Geiseln. Pabel (Utopia Zukunftsroman #355), 1962.
- Death for Auld Lang Syne (1963)
- Ultimatum in 2050 A.D. (1963, 1965, auch als The Programmed People, 2010)
  - German: Revolution um die Zukunft. Pabel (Utopia Zukunftsroman #547), 1967.
- The Addams Family (novelisation of the television series, 1965)
- It’s Magic, You Dope! (1962, 2009)
- The Crispin Affair (1960, 2012)

=== Short stories ===
- The Captain of His Soul (1959)
- The Obvious Solution (1959)
- The Arm of Enmord (1959)
- Queen of the Green Sun (1959)
- Bedside Monster (1959)
- The Kink-Remover (1959)
- Dolce Al Fine (1959)
- Let X = Alligator (1959)
- The Blackbird (1959)
- Ship Ahoy! (1959)
- Minor Detail (1959)
- Multum in Parvo (1959)
- The Man Who Was Pale (1959)
- To Each His Own (1960)
- Multum in Parvo Rides Again (1960)
- Old Friends Are the Best (1960)
- Doomsday Army (1960)
- The Dope On Mars (1960)
- The Business, As Usual (1960)
- The Final Ingredient (1960)
  - German: Hexen-Einmaleins. In: Helmuth W. Mommers & Arnulf D. Krauß (Hrsg.): 21 Grusel Stories – Ein Menü aus Alpträumen. Heyne (Heyne Anthologien, Bd. 21), 1967.
- Squeeze (1960)
- Status Quaint (1960)
- According to Plan (1961)
- The Contact Point (1961)
- A Thread in Time (1961)
- Night Caller (1961)
- Are You Now or Have You Ever Been? (1961)
- The Flying Tuskers of K’niik-K’naak (1961)
- No Harm Done (1961)
- One Small Drawback (1961)
- Conversation with a Bug (1961)
- Robotum Delenda Est! (1962)
- Double or Nothing (1962)
- Behind the Door (1962)
- The Leech (1963)
- The Smart Ones (1963)
- The Trouble With Tweenity (1963)
- Collector’s Item (1963)
  - Deutsch: Der letzte Beweis. In: Charlotte Winheller (Hrsg.): Die Überlebenden. Heyne (Heyne Allgemeine Reihe #272), 1964.
- The After Time (1963)
- The Aftertime (1963)
- The Awakening (1964)
  - Deutsch: Das Erwachen. In: Walter Ernsting (Hrsg.): 9 Science Fiction-Stories. Heyne (Heyne-Anthologien #14), 1965.
- The Orginorg Way (1964)
- Survival of the Fittest (1964)
  - Deutsch: Am Ende aller Träume. In: Charlotte Winheller (Hrsg.): Die Kristallwelt. Heyne (Heyne Science Fiction & Fantasy #3027), 1964.
- At the Feelies (1964)
- Illusion (1964)
- The Twerlik (1964)
- Trade-In (1964)
  - German: Die Dämonin. In: Walter Ernsting (Hrsg.): Wanderer durch Zeit und Raum. Heyne (Heyne Science Fiction & Fantasy), 1964.
- The Venus Charm (1964)
- Weetl (1964)
- Footnote to an Old Story (1964)
- Hear and Obey (1964)
- The Grooves (1964)
- Breakthrough (1964)
  - German: Die Maschine mit Humor. In: Wulf H. Bergner (Hrsg.): Grenzgänger zwischen den Welten. Heyne (Heyne Science Fiction & Fantasy #3089), 1967.
- The Pool (1964)
- The Seminarian (1964)
- Blue Boy (1965)
- Essentials Only (1965)
- Look Out Below (1965)
- Trouble with Hyperspace (1965)
- The Glorious Fourth (1965)
- Life Cycle (1970)
- Rate of Exchange (1971)
- The Phantom Ship (1985)
- Cinderella Meets the Wolfman!: A Howlingly Funny Musical Spoof (1988, with Tim Kelly)

=== Plays ===
- Here Lies Jeremy Troy (1965)
- M is for Million (1971)
- How Green Was My Brownie (1972)
- Kiss or Make Up (1972)
- Meanwhile, Back on the Couch (1973)
- A Gentleman and a Scoundrel (1973)
- Roomies (1974)
- Spinoff (1974)
- Who’s on First? (1975)
- What a Spoil (1975, with Dave Reiser)
- Saving Grace (1976)
- Take a Number, Darling (1976)
- The Creature Creeps! (1977)
- Dream Lover (1977)
- Hope for the Best (1977, with Dave Reiser)
- Rich Is Better (1977)
- The Murder Room (1977)
- Pushover (1977, with Ken Easton)
- Once Is Enough (1977)
- The Clone People (as Mike Johnson) (1978)
- Missing Link (1978)
- Turnabout (1978, with Ken Easton)
- Not the Count of Monte Cristo? (1978, with Dave Reiser)
- Turkey in the Straw (1979)
- Operetta! (1979, with Dave Reiser)
- My Son the Astronaut (1980)
- Par for the Corpse (1980)
- Play On! (1980)
- Honestly Now (1981)
- The Return of the Maniac (1981, as Mike Johnson)
- Slow Down, Sweet Chariot (1982, with Dave Reiser)
- Woman Overboard (1982, with Dave Reiser)
- Your Flake or Mine? (1982)
- The Picture of Dorian Gray, from the novel by Oscar Wilde (1982)
- The Saloonkeeper’s Daughter (1982, with Dave Reiser)
- The Second Lady (1983)
- And on the Sixth Day (1984, with Dave Reiser)
- Dracula, the Musical? : Book, Music, and Lyrics (1984, as Rick Abbot)
- The Bride of Brackenloch! (1987, as Rick Abbot)
- I Take this Man (1991)
- Sing On! (1991)

== Bibliography ==
- Hans Joachim Alpers, Werner Fuchs, Ronald M. Hahn: Reclams Science-fiction-Führer. Stuttgart: Reclam, 1982, ISBN 3-15-010312-6, p. 366.
- Hans Joachim Alpers, Werner Fuchs, Ronald M. Hahn, Wolfgang Jeschke: Lexikon der Science Fiction Literatur. München: Heyne, 1991, ISBN 3-453-02453-2, p. 878.
- John Clute: Sharkey, Jack. In: John Clute, Peter Nicholls: The Encyclopedia of Science Fiction. 3. Auflage (Online-Ausgabe), Version vom 30. August 2016.
- Robert Reginald: Science Fiction and Fantasy Literature. A Checklist, 1700–1974 with Contemporary Science Fiction Authors II. Detroit: Gale, 1979. ISBN 0-8103-1051-1, p. 1070.
- Robert Reginald: Contemporary Science Fiction Authors. New York: Arno Press, 1974. ISBN 0-405-06332-6, p. 239 .
- Donald H. Tuck: The Encyclopedia of Science Fiction and Fantasy through 1968. Chicago: Advent, 1974, ISBN 0-911682-20-1, p. 384.
- George Kelley: Sharkey, Jack. In: Noelle Watson, Paul E. Schellinger: Twentieth-Century Science-Fiction Writers. Chicago: St. James Press, 1991, ISBN 1-55862-111-3, p. 709–711.
