= Kris Carr =

American author and speaker

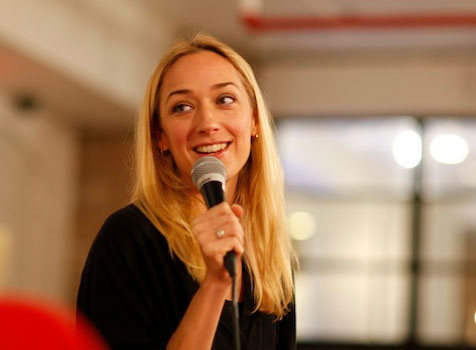
- Born: 31 August 1971 (age 55)
- Education: Marymount Manhattan College
- Occupations: Podcast host, Author, Wellness coach, Entrepreneur
- Spouse: Brian Fassett (m. 2006)
- Website: kriscarr.com

Kris Carr (born August 31, 1971) is an American author, alternative cancer treatment advocate and entrepreneur who promotes the alkaline diet. She is the founder of the Inner Circle Wellness online community and is a member of Oprah's SuperSoul 100.

== Early life ==
Carr grew up in Pawling, New York and attended the Wooster School in Danbury, Connecticut. She attended the School of Performing Arts in New Milford, Connecticut, where she studied dance and Italian. After high school, Carr attended Sarah Lawrence College and later Marymount Manhattan College where she majored in English Literature and Art History.

== Career ==
Carr appeared in television shows including Law & Order as well as dozens of commercials, most notably as a Bud girl for two Budweiser beer Super Bowl commercials.

Carr play a role in Arthur Miller's Mr. Peters' Connections.

From 1999 to 2006, Carr had a photography business in New York City where she shot portraits and head-shots for actors.

From 2023 to 2024, Carr expanded her influence through media appearances and the release of I'm Not a Mourning Person, receiving coverage in Oprah Daily and The Sunday Paper.

Her expertise has been featured across numerous platforms, including appearances on NBC News Daily, PIX11, and various national broadcasts, where she continues to share insights about integrating physical and emotional wellness drawn from her two-decade journey as a cancer thriver.

On February 14, 2003, Carr was diagnosed with a rare Stage IV cancer called epithelioid hemangioendothelioma affecting her liver and her lungs.

Carr transformed her 2003 stage IV cancer diagnosis into a wellness movement, becoming a New York Times bestselling author and prominent wellness leader. She developed a comprehensive approach to wellness through her Inner Circle Wellness community, built around her signature Five Pillars of Wellness: what you're eating, what you're drinking, what you're thinking, how you're resting, and how you're renewing. Her holistic philosophy, which combines both conventional medicine and holistic healing practices, has reached millions through appearances on Good Morning America, The Today Show, and The Oprah Winfrey Show. Through her programs, bestselling books, and the Made to Thrive podcast, she emphasizes that vibrant health comes from the pillars working together to support whole-person care.

== Plant-based diet ==
Carr promotes an alkaline "anti-inflammatory plant-based diet" to reduce cancer risk. She has commented that "a diet heavy with animal products is highly acidic, and acidity creates an environment for cancer cells to thrive". She recommends juicing and consuming organic raw green vegetables, avocados, flaxseed oil, nuts and sweet potatoes.

== Works ==
=== Documentary ===
In March 2007 the documentary Crazy Sexy Cancer was released, along with a companion book: Crazy Sexy Cancer Tips. In the book, Carr points out that when she first was diagnosed there weren't any books or movies that dealt with the situations and problems facing young women with cancer. She wanted to use her experience to help others. The documentary was a hit at the South by Southwest Film Festival in Austin, Texas and went on to air on TLC (The Learning Channel). Four years after its release, in October 2011, Crazy Sexy Cancer was featured as part of the Super Soul Sunday series on OWN.

=== TV ===
In October 2007, Carr appeared on The Oprah Winfrey Show, along with professor and inspirational speaker Randy Pausch for a show on confronting death.

=== Selected publications ===
- Crazy Sexy Cancer Tips. Charleston: Skirt! (2007); ISBN 1-59921-231-5
- Crazy Sexy Cancer Survivor. Charleston: Skirt! (2008);. ISBN 1-59921-370-2
- Crazy Sexy Diet. Charleston: Skirt! (2011); ISBN 1-59921-801-1
- Crazy Sexy Kitchen. Hay House (2012);. ISBN 1-40194-104-4
- Crazy Sexy Juice. Hay House (2016);. ISBN 1401941532
- I'm Not a Mourning Person. Hay House (2023);. ISBN 9781401970062

== Personal life ==
Carr resides in Connecticut with her husband, Brian Fassett; the couple wedded in 2006.
