= Joseph Kesselring =

American dramatist (1902–1967)

Joseph Otto Kesselring (June 21, 1902 – November 5, 1967) was an American playwright who was best known for writing Arsenic and Old Lace.

== Biography ==
He was born on June 21, 1902, in New York City, to Henry and Frances Kesselring. His father's parents were immigrants from Germany. His mother was an English Canadian. Kesselring spent much of his life in and around the theater. In 1922, he began teaching vocal music and directed stage productions at Bethel College, a Mennonite school in North Newton, Kansas.

After two years, Kesselring left teaching and returned to the stage, working for two years with an amateur theatrical group in Niagara, New York. He began working as a freelance playwright in 1933, completing twelve original plays, of which four were produced on Broadway: There's Wisdom in Women (1935), "Cross-Town" (1937), Arsenic and Old Lace (1941), and Four Twelves are 48 (1951). Arsenic and Old Lace ran for 1444 performances on Broadway and 1337 performances in London. It became a staple in high school and dinner theater circuits. The 1944 movie adaptation, directed by Frank Capra and starring Cary Grant, was also a comedy hit.

Arsenic and Old Lace appeared at a time of strong isolationist sentiment regarding European affairs, of the sort that was very strong where Kesselring went to college. The play suggested that the elite running America had a murderous heritage. Kesselring lived in a college house that would later be the basis of the set of Arsenic and Old Lace. Locals have tried to identify who were some of the character models he used. Kesselring was an Episcopalian who did not fit in well with the strait-laced college. Bethel replaced him in 1924.

== Death and legacy ==
Kesselring died on November 5, 1967, in Kingston, New York, aged 65.

In 1980, the National Arts Club created the Joseph Kesselring Prize for up-and-coming playwrights. It was funded by Kesselring's widow, Charlotte. Among the playwrights who have won the prize are Tony Kushner, David Adjmi, Doug Wright, Anna Deavere Smith, David Auburn, Rajiv Joseph, Melissa James Gibson, Jo Carson, Nicky Silver, David Lindsay-Abaire, José Rivera, Naomi Wallace, Philip Kan Gotanda, Tracey Scott Wilson, and Marion McClinton.
