= Christopher Bigsby =

British literary analyst and novelist

Christopher Bigsby FRSA FRSL
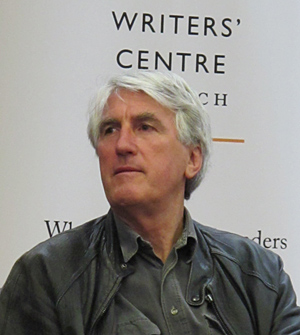
- Bigsby at the Writers' Centre Norwich in 2011
- Born: Christopher William Edgar Bigsby; 27 June 1941 (age 85); Dundee, Scotland
- Education: Kansas State University; University of Sheffield (BA); University of Sheffield (MA); University of Nottingham (PhD)
- Occupations: Academic, novelist

Christopher William Edgar Bigsby FRSA FRSL, (born 27 June 1941) is a British literary analyst and novelist, with more than sixty books to his credit. Earlier in his writing career, his books were published under the name C. W. E. Bigsby. He has won awards for his work on the American theatre, for his biography of Arthur Miller, for his first novel, Hester, and for his work in study abroad. He holds honorary degrees from Bolton University and the Complutense University of Madrid.

Bigsby was educated at Sutton County Grammar School and thence at the University of Sheffield, for his BA (1959–1962) and MA (1962–64), before moving to the University of Nottingham for his PhD (1964–66). His first appointment as an American Literature lecturer was at the University of Wales, Aberystwyth. In 1969, he moved to the University of East Anglia (UEA) in Norwich rising to Professor of American Studies in 1985, a post he held until retiring in 2018, thence becoming emeritus professor.

He travelled widely for the British Council and chaired their Cambridge Seminar for eighteen years, an event which brought writers and academics from around the world to meet with British writers. He has been a contributor to BBC Radio, presenting many programmes over the years. Besides his many academic books he collaborated with his friend and colleague Malcolm Bradbury on two television plays and an 8-part situation comedy, Patterson. They were also joint editors of the multi-volume Contemporary Writers series for Methuen.

Bigsby has written extensively on American theatre, and in particular has published widely on the playwright Arthur Miller. His books on Miller include, Arthur Miller & Company (1990), The Cambridge Companion to Arthur Miller (1997), Arthur Miller: A Critical Study (2005), and Remembering Arthur Miller (2005). In November 2008, Bigsby published the first volume of his biography of Miller, based on boxes of papers Miller made available to him before he died in 2005, as well as countless interviews and conversations during a friendship with the playwright that lasted over three decades. The second volume appeared three years later. The biography was serialised in The Daily Telegraph and was Book of the Week on BBC Radio 4.

His work has ranged widely from a study of African-American writers, The Second Black Renaissance, to a work inspired by the work of his colleague W. G. Sebald: Remembering and Imagining the Holocaust: The Chain of Memory, a meditative study on memory and on the ways in which memory has operated in the work of writers for whom the Holocaust was a defining event. The book includes essays on Jean Améry, Tadeusz Borowski, Anne Frank, Rolf Hochhuth, Primo Levi, Arthur Miller, W. G. Sebald, Elie Wiesel and Peter Weiss.

Bigsby has written about Dada and Surrealism, British playwrights and popular culture but remains best known for his work on the American theatre, his three-volume Introduction to Twentieth Century American Drama becoming a standard work. He followed this with Modern American Drama and Contemporary American Playwrights. Individual studies included Joe Orton, Edward Albee, David Mamet and Neil LaBute. He has published a study of American television drama, Viewing America: Twenty-First Century Television Drama and three volumes on American playwrights who have emerged since 2000, Twenty-First Century American Playwrights (2018), Staging America: 21st Century Dramatists (2020), and American Dramatists in the 21st Century: Opening Doors (2023).

Bigsby was the founder director of the Arthur Miller Centre (now Institute) for American Studies at the University of East Anglia whose International Literary Festival he has presented for twenty-eight years, and from which seven volumes of edited interviews have been published as the "Writers in Conversation" series. The Miller Institute was a founder member of the American Studies Network. He was also the founder director of the British Archive for Contemporary Writing until 2018.

== Bibliography ==
=== Literary criticism ===
- Confrontation and Commitment: A Study of Contemporary American Drama (1967)
- Albee (1969)
- The Black American Writer, 2 vols., ed. (1971)
- Dada and Surrealism (1972)
- Superculture, ed. (1975)
- Edward Albee, ed. (1975)
- Approaches to Popular Culture, ed. (1976)
- Tom Stoppard (1980)
- The Second Black Renaissance (1980)
- Contemporary English Drama, ed. (1981)
- The Radical Imagination and the Liberal Tradition, ed. with Heide Ziegler (1982)
- Joe Orton (1982)
- A Critical Introduction to 20th Century American Drama, 1900–1940 (1982)
- A Critical Introduction to 20th Century American Drama; Williams, Miller, Albee (1984)
- A Critical Introduction to 20th Century American Drama: Broadway and Beyond (1985)
- David Mamet (1985)
- Cultural Change in the United States Since World War II, ed. (1986)
- Plays by Susan Glaspell, ed. (1987)
- Miller on File (1988)
- Miller and Company, ed. (1990)
- Modern American drama, 1945-1990. Cambridge: Cambridge UP. 1992.
- The Portable Arthur Miller, ed. (1995)
- Nineteenth Century American Short Stories, ed. (1995)
- The Cambridge Companion to Arthur Miller, ed.(1997)
- The Cambridge History of American Theatre, 3 vols (1998, 1999, 2000) Vol I, ed. with Don Wilmeth.
- Contemporary American Playwrights (1999)
- The Cambridge History of American Literature Vol 7; Prose Writing 1940–1990, Bigsby, Dickstein, Burt, Steiner and Patell, ed. Sacvan Bercovitch. (1999)
- Modern American drama, 1945-2000. Cambridge: Cambridge UP. 2000.
- Writers in Conversation, ed. 7 vols. 2000, 2001, 2011 (2 vols), 2013, 2017, 2019
- Cambridge Companion to David Mamet, ed. (2004)
- Arthur Miller: A Critical Study (2005)
- The New Introduction to American Studies, ed. With Howard Temperley (2005)
- Remembering Arthur Miller, ed. (2005)
- The Cambridge Companion to Modern American Culture, ed. (2006)
- Remembering and Imagining the Holocaust: The Chain of Memory (2006)
- The Cambridge Companion to August Wilson, ed. (2007)
- Neil LaBute (2007)
- Arthur Miller: A Biography 1915–1962 (2008)
- The Cambridge Companion to Arthur Miller, ed. (2010)
- Arthur Miller: A Biography: 1962–2005 (2011)
- Viewing America: Twenty-First Century Television Drama (2013)
- Twenty-First Century American Playwrights (2018)
- Staging America: 21st Century Dramatists (2020)
- American Dramatists in the 21st Century: Opening Doors (2023)
- Four Contemporary American Playwrights: Exploring Identity (2026)
- The Arthur Miller Tapes (2026)

=== Plays ===
- The After Dinner Game, BBC TV, with Malcolm Bradbury (1975), in The After Dinner Games and Other Plays.
- Stones. The Mind Beyond, BBC TV, with Malcolm Bradbury. (1976)
- Patterson, an eight part comedy series, BBC Radio, with Malcolm Bradbury. (1981)
- Long Day’s Journey, BBC Radio 4. (1988)

=== Novels ===
- Hester: A Romance. (1994)
- Pearl: A Romance. (1995)
- Still Lives.(1996)
- Beautiful Dreamer. (2002)
- One Hundred Days: One Hundred Nights. (2008)
- Poe, Of The Revenant. (2012)
- Ballygoran. (2014)
- Flint. (2015)
- The Hotel. (2016)
- Ishmael. (2019)
- Dreamcatcher. (2023)

=== Poetry ===
- In the Face of Darkness. (2024)

=== Critical studies and reviews of Bigsby's work ===
Modern American drama, 1945-1990

- Pearce, Howard (Spring 1994). "Accounting for the play : fifty years of American drama". Contemporary Literature. 35 (1): 203–211. doi:10.2307/1208744. JSTOR 1208744.

== Awards ==
- Honorary Doctor of Arts, University of Bolton
- Honorary Degree, Complutense University of Madrid
- McKitterick Award (for Hester).
- American Library Association Notable Book (Beautiful Dreamer).
- Bernard Hewitt Award, for Outstanding Research in Theatre History, with Don Wilmeth. (The Cambridge History of American Theatre).
- The James Tait Black Memorial Prize (shortlisted), the Sheridan Morley Prize (shortlisted), the George Freedley Memorial Award (shortlisted), joint winner American Studies Network Award, CHOICE Outstanding Academic Title (Arthur Miller: A Biography).
- The Betty Jean Jones Award for Outstanding Teacher of American Theatre and Drama.
- Education Abroad Leadership Award, NAFSA.
- Exceptional Contribution Award, East Anglia Book Awards.
- Elected Fellow of the Royal Society of Literature (2000)

== BBC Radio ==
- A presenter of Radio 4's Kaleidoscope for eight years and BBC World Service's Meridian and Radio 4's Off the Page for two years.
- Presenter of Radio 4's Present Voices, Past Words, The Index, The Archive Hour, Centurions, Miller’s Tales and of Radio 3's First Night and Third Ear.
