= Fugitive Kind =

1937 play by Tennessee Williams

Fugitive Kind is a 1937 play written by Tennessee Williams. The play is evocative of a Clifford Odets Depression era play. The action takes place in a flophouse in Two Rivers, Mississippi, during the waning days of 1936, as the New Year 1937 is imminent. The play features a lonesome clerk, who oversees a hotel that houses a collection of alcoholic losers and a rebellious college student. The owner of the hotel is an obsessive Jew. The clerk is befriended by an on-the-run gangster, Terry Meighan, who claims to be a victim of the corrupt social system. He represents hope to the hotel clerk.

== Reviews ==
- Slobodnik, Syd. "Early Williams is Just a Shadow of His Best". the217.com. Illini Media.
