= Bride of Brackenloch =

The Bride of Brackenloch is an off-Broadway play written in 1987 by Jack Sharkey, published under the pseudonym "Rick Abbot". The play is a farce.

== Plot ==
The action takes place in Scotland. The story is about Jabez Thorngall, who lost his bride, Victoria Cavendish, to an ancient family curse. After the ordeal, Jabez takes a new bride, an American heiress and Scottish bartender named Daphne Dixon.

Soon after, a piece of leather called the Strong Wong Hong Kong tong gong thong, stolen by Jabez's grandfather goes missing and Jabez's sister's husband is found locked in the Brackenloch vault. The major suspect is revealed to be a handyman who works for Jabez.

== Characters ==
Jabez Thorngall - The leading male character in the play. He is Scottish

Daphne Dixon - The female lead who disguised herself as Jabez's first bride, Victoria Cavendish. Daphne is the daughter of an American millionaire and was hired in Scotland to work as a barmaid in the Thorngalls' pub.

Alicia, Lady Goddard - The sister of Jabez's late mother, making her his aunt

Comfort Grody - Jabez's close childhood friend who thought that she was going to marry Jabez, based on what Jabez said to her before he left to calm down following Victoria's disappearance. Comfort is British.

Glynis Thorngall Prescott - Jabez's sister who married detective Eldwyn Prescott.

Mavis Beaufort - The Thorngalls' neighbor who supposedly saw Victoria Cavendish fall off the moors on the day of her disappearance. She has an estate called Cobwithers which she hopes to connect with the Brackenloch property.

Janet Magleesh - The Thorngalls' tough-talking housekeeper

Fenella Magleesh - Initially a scullery maid and assistant to Janet Magleesh, she is revealed in Act 3 to be Janet's daughter. She was crying in Act 1 for reasons unexplained. In Act 3, both Janet and Fenella reveal that she was upset over Jabez's decision to marry both the non-existent Victoria Cavendish and then Daphne Dixon because she hoped she would one day catch Jabez's attention.

Eldwyn Prescott - Detective and Glynis's husband who disguised himself as another detective named Wilbur Yardley to investigate the disappearance of the non-existent Victoria Cavendish, with the help of Comfort Grody.

Mrs. Mousely - The Thorngalls' "cranky cook" as she describes herself.

Andrew McHandford - The Thorngalls' gardener and handyman who was revealed to be involved in the death of Jabez's grandfather. He tries to defend himself by pointing a gun at everyone, only to be abducted and eaten by the thought-to-be-existing Beast of Brackenloch, whom the family calls "Bracky".

== Revivals ==
In 2002, the play was performed in Dickinson, North Dakota. The production received a positive review from The Dickinson Press.

In 2011, the play was performed at the Colonial Playhouse in Alden, Pennsylvania. The production received a positive review in Stage Magazine.
