= All Because of Agatha =

All Because of Agatha is a comic play written by Jonathan Troy. It was first published in 1964 by Dramatists Play Service. The play is presented in three acts, often with two intermissions. The play has been a long-standing favorite of community theatre groups, collegiate theatre troupes, and high school drama clubs thanks to its modest production values. One major set is used, and there are ten cast members in the script. Although the play was written in the 1960s, the action can easily take place in the present day.

== Synopsis ==
=== Act 1 ===
Duff O'Hara is a cartoonist for an unnamed Eastern newspaper. He and his bride, Joan, are intrigued by an old house in historic Salem, Massachusetts. They plan to buy it until their realtor, Mr. Van Buren, is forced to disclose why the price is so low - it's haunted. But Joan is delighted, being an occult fanatic. Van Buren tells the couple about Agatha Forbes, a witch who was burned at the stake during the Salem Witch Trials. A book in the house is pointed out, which tells the whole story. She had vowed to return to the spot where it happened every year, and did. Every time a new owner would buy the house, they'd be scared off every November 22. Joan decides to throw a party that upcoming November 22, an effort to convince Agatha Forbes to quit haunting the house. Duff signs the papers and they move in.

Duff and Joan get a visit from Miss Elsie Boggs, who heads the Salem psychic society and unsuccessfully tries to get the couple to join. They also hire a sassy Brooklynite, Ethel, as their housekeeper. They also meet Dr. Randolph, their next door neighbor who is an obstetrician. It turns out his mother, Madame LaSolda, is a medium. Once Joan's aunt Thelma unexpectedly shows up, weird things start to happen: Ethel is smacked upside the head with a pot that flew off the kitchen shelf, and Thelma receives a message from Agatha Forbes via her Ouija board.

=== Act 2 ===
It's the night of November 22, time for the big witch-hunting party. The local newspaper sends its star reporter, Flip Cannon, to cover the proceedings. Then begins some romantic tension between him and Ethel. Madame LaSolda also arrives for the party, then Dr. Randolph. Madame LaSolda tells the story about how Agatha Forbes spiked her orange juice one year and woke up the next day with an awful hangover.

Soon, the appointed hour of 10:00 pm approaches, and Agatha Forbes makes her appearance, with a bad attitude. She tries to get them to leave the house, but everyone just stares at her in amusement. As Duff becomes more and more fed up with the goings-on, Madame LaSolda tries to set it up so that the spell would be broken. Things go hilariously wrong.

=== Act 3 ===
The attempt to break the spell doesn't work, because Agatha now has the power to make everyone in the house do what she wants. She gets Madame LaSolda drunk, Duff and Joan to quarrel violently, and positions Ethel and Flip, along with Dr. Randolph and Thelma, in suggestive positions. Things only calm down after Duff threatens to move out and Ethel quits her job, and that's when Agatha really starts to have fun. Flip is transformed from slick reporter to suave ladies man and is able to seduce Ethel. Dr. Randolph is transformed from a milquetoast geek to a John Wayne-style hunk and sweeps Thelma off her feet. Agatha is able to keep Duff from moving out after Joan discloses that she is pregnant.

Duff and Joan make up and decide to figure out a way to break the spell themselves and get Agatha out of their hair for good. They peruse the book about Agatha and realize that the Latin language makes her itch, and in order to break the spell, they must say one certain phrase to Agatha, and get her to speak Latin in return. They find the phrase, and the spell is broken. Agatha is gone - permanently.

== References and reviews ==
- Amazon.com
- www.bn.com
