= The Monkey Jar =

- Original language: English
- Written by: Richard Martin Hirsch
- Characters: Michael Dori; Kai Goldman; Robert Rees; Judith Heptner; Aaron Goldman; Nancy Goldman; Coral Bryson
- Genre: Drama
- Setting: Elementary School in Los Angeles, California

Premiere
- Date: February 2, 2008
- Place: Reuben Cordova Theatre; Beverly Hills, California

The Monkey Jar is a 2008 play written by California playwright Richard Martin Hirsch. The play opened in Beverly Hills on February 2, 2008, and closed on March 8, 2008, in the Reuben Cordova Theatre. The production was directed by Warren Davis and starred Henry Hayashi, Mark Berry, and Sekai Murashige, alternating with Josh Ogner. Set Design by Jeff G. Rack; Lighting Design by Meghan Hong; Costume Design by Holly Victoria; Sound Design by Jonathan Snipes. Produced by Theatre Forty and Storey Productions.

== Plot summary ==
Michael Dori, a Japanese American, teaches at Bienvenida Elementary School in Beverly Hills, priding himself on the fact that his students regularly score in the top five percent of state standardized tests. However, when he is confronted by a 10-year-old Japanese student with an apparent learning disability, Kai Goldman, the authoritarian teacher first tries to bond with the child through the commonality of their race, and then pushes the child too hard in class regarding multiplication tables, which seriously embarrasses the boy. The next day, the child brings a gun to school.

The reason the child brought the weapon is the central conflict of the play. The teacher, Mr. Dori, accuses the boy of trying to get retribution for the embarrassment he felt over the incident with the multiplication tables. The child insists he was bringing the gun to impress his teacher. The weapon is an old Civil War relic and incapable of actually being fired, a fact Kai insists he was intimately aware.

Left to sort out the issue is the school's African-American principal, Robert Rees, who has only held the position a few months, and Coral Bryson the specialist in charge of Kai's Individualized Education Program. Complicating the already tedious racial issue is Kai's adoptive parents, Aaron and Nancy Goldman, who are Jewish.

The play, which is told from Coral's perspective, examines many school issues including race, parental involvement, and the differences in quality between public and private schools.

== Reaction and reviews ==
Dany Margolies of Backstage West called the play "a worthy and interesting World Premiere" in which director Warren Davis delivered "a unified world for the actors and creative staging across the theatre's wide space that enables the many scenes to flow." She goes on to laud the performances of Amy Tolsky, Mark Berry, and especially Addie Daddio.

Amy Nicholoson of LA Weekly named The Monkey Jar a "GO" (Critic's Pick) and went on to say: "Playwright Richard Martin Hirsch has set up a credible and inextricable trap..." "Warren Davis' production is engrossing, with the parents' scenes appropriately screwball; Act 2 rehashes the problem in ever louder voices before homing in on what could feel to some like a slightly unsatisfying solution. But among the script's strong achievements is the tightly wound Mr. Dori, an undeniably good — if authoritarian — teacher who's proud that his kids score in the state's top 5 percent, and bristles at the insinuation that spurring them to achieve doesn't prove that he cares."

Cynthia Citron of Curtain Up said: "With just a minimal amount of furniture and Meghan Hong's effective lighting design, the production bounces along with a fast-paced contemporaneousness. Director Warren Davis leads these seasoned professionals through the ramifications of a felony committed by a child and to the consequences for all involved. It's a gripping story told by a superb cast, and well worth a visit."

Daryl Miller of the Los Angeles Times called the script, "Well-intended...", stating: "The story is complicated by layer upon layer of social, economic and ethnic detail." "On Los Angeles' affluent Westside, frustration builds in an elementary school classroom when a 10-year-old with a mild learning disability is pushed hard by a teacher who, unaware of the boy's condition, wants every student to perform well. The youngster adopts sarcasm as psychological armor but, when pressured, becomes panicky and tearful -- qualities well conveyed at the reviewed performance by Sekai Murashige, who alternates with Josh Ogner. His teacher, as portrayed by Henry Hayashi, is energetic and inspiring, though he makes regrettable choices as he tries to break through to this student. In the tense situation that results, the school's new principal, played by Mark Berry, finds his ambitions -- as well as his compassionate best efforts for the kids -- in danger of being erased."
