= Finishing the Picture =

Play written by Arthur Miller

Finishing the Picture is Arthur Miller's final play. It was produced at the Goodman Theatre in Chicago, Illinois, in October 2004, four months before Miller's death on February 10, 2005.

== Production ==
The Goodman Theatre production was directed by Robert Falls, and starred Matthew Modine, Harris Yulin, Frances Fisher, Stacy Keach, Stephen Lang, Linda Lavin, Scott Glenn, and Heather Prete. It opened on October 5, 2004 and closed on November 7, 2004.

Finishing the Picture is a thinly veiled autobiographical examination of the time Miller and his then-wife Marilyn Monroe spent shooting The Misfits (1961). Miller and Monroe's marriage was deteriorating at the time of shooting — the summer and fall of 1960 — due to her rampant drug abuse, her open infidelity with actor Yves Montand, and her panoply of mental illnesses. Also featured are characters who are closely related to real persons, including a film director reminiscent of John Huston; two acting teachers, clearly based on Monroe's Actors Studio coaches, Lee and Paula Strasberg; as well as the play's screenwriter, based on Arthur Miller himself.

== Summary ==
Kitty was a successful actress, a natural choice for a major motion picture. But as production gets under way, her acting is increasingly hindered by mental illness and a drug-induced haze.

The play opens with the producer, who must decide whether to cancel the late, over-budget picture altogether, or whether Kitty will be able to finish. Kitty's secretary, a kind-hearted young woman, is said to have been modelled after artist Agnes Barley, who was Miller's live-in girlfriend at the time of the production and was 55 years his junior.
