= There's Wisdom in Women =

Play by Joseph Kesselring

- Original language: English
- Written by: Joseph Kesselring
- Genre: Comedy

Premiere
- Date: October 30, 1935
- Place: Cort Theatre

There's Wisdom in Women is a play written by Joseph Kesselring. Producer D. A. Doran staged it on Broadway in 1935. Walter Pidgeon played Leon Nordoff, a famous pianist who has cheated on his wife, Margalo (Ruth Weston). She must decide whether to stay with him, and seeks advice from her friend, Tony Cooke (Glenn Anders).

In his review for The New York Times, Brooks Atkinson said the play was "old hat" produced by "routine playwrighting". Robert Benchley was similarly dismissive in The New Yorker, saying the play need not have been produced at all. The production closed in less than a month, after 46 performances.
