= They Too Arise =

They Too Arise was an early work of Arthur Miller. It was a rewrite of No Villain.
