= Cat O'Nine Tails (play) =

1927 three act detective play

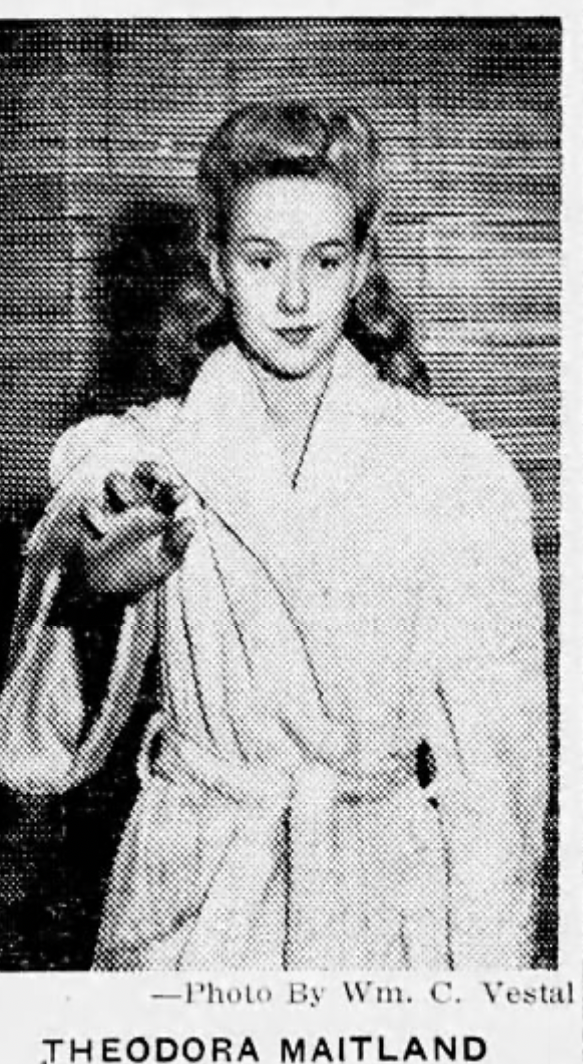
- Actress as Theodora Maitland (1942)
- Written by: Lawrence Gray Worcestor
- Original language: English
- Genre: Detective play
- Setting: The Gordon "Lodge" a country home in Maine

Premiere

Cat O'Nine Tails is a 1927 three act mystery (or detective) play written by Lawrence Gray Worcester.

== Plot ==
James Gordon's country home is invaded in the night by a nefarious thief who goes by the alias Cat O'Nine Tails, and who seeks to obtain important government documents held by James. Mr. Gordon is staying at his country home with his wife, Mrs. Gordon; their son Jimmie; and his fiancee, the wealthy Theodora Maitland. The aforementioned personages are accompanied by the staff, which includes Henry, a seemingly unintelligent chore boy, with a tendency to quote Shakespeare, and Jacob Webber, the caretaker, whose daughter Betty, while not a member of the staff, is also present. Jimmie, despite being engaged to Theodora, is secretly married to Betty. Mr. Gordon is horrified when he learns of Jimmie's marriage.

Fox, a detective, and Miss Smith, a government agent, arrive at the house to stop Cat O'Nine Tails. Fox soon comes to suspect Mr. Gordon of being Cat O'Nine Tails. Cat O'Nine Tails hypnotizes Jacob into shooting himself, and he nearly dies. Fox believes Mr. Gordon is responsible. Theodora suddenly announces that she is Cat O'Nine Tails's wife, and disappears down a secret passageway. The others uncover the secret passage, wherein Miss Smith discovers Theodora lying on a couch, unconscious. Miss Smith wakes her and is able to discern that Theodora's previous outburst was a result of having been hypnotized by Cat O'Nine Tails. Fox goes insane, apparently having been drugged by the same. Henry appears and reveals himself as Cat O'Nine Tails. He snatches a gun from Betty and demands that Miss Smith give him the government documents. Suddenly everyone hears the sound of barking and pistol shots; the family dog, Rover, has alerted the authorities to the danger that his family is in. The heroes are to be rescued and Henry to be apprehended.

== Notable performances ==
Cat O'Nine Tails was often performed by American high schools in the early 20th century.

In 1929, the play was performed by college students in the gymnasium of American University, Washington.

In 1929, the play was performed by the senior class of Decatur High, in Decatur, Hoosier.

In 1936, the play was performed at the Balboa High School, Balboa, Panama.

The play was performed at Western Hills High, Cincinnati, Ohio in 1939.

== Sequel ==
In 1930, a sequel was published: another detective play, entitled The Lady of the Lilacs. This drama features Miss Smith investigating a murder in a small town.
