= No Villain =

No Villain is a play written by Arthur Miller during his sophomore year of college in 1936, during spring break. This was his first work, reportedly written in five days in the hope of winning a $250 Hopwood Award in drama, the first of two that he won. No Villain explores Marxist theory and inner conflict through an individual facing ruin as a result of a strike.

== Plot ==
In the first scene, the audience is introduced to the Simons, an immigrant family, in their parlor, anxiously awaiting the return of their son from university. The Simons were once successful, but appear to have fallen upon rough times.

== World première ==
The play was rediscovered by British theatre director Sean Turner, and received its world première at the Old Red Lion Theatre in London, UK, in December 2015.

In June 2016, the production transferred to Trafalgar Studios in London's West End.

== Rewrite ==
They Too Arise was a rewrite of No Villain.
