= List of MGM+ original programming =

MGM+ is an American premium cable and satellite television network owned and operated by the MGMPlus Entertainment subsidiary of Metro-Goldwyn-Mayer (MGM), which is itself a subsidiary of Amazon MGM Studios. MGM+ is also available as a direct-to-consumer service. MGM+'s programming primarily includes theatrically-released films and original television series, along with unscripted docuseries and documentaries, occasional stand-up comedy specials and made-for-TV movies.

Outside of the United States, MGM+ is available in selected territories as a subscription video on demand streaming service through third-party platforms such as Amazon Channels and Apple TV Channels.

== Current programming ==
=== Drama ===
Title	Genre	Premiere	Seasons	Runtime	Status
Godfather of Harlem	Crime drama	September 29, 2019 (Note: Premiered on Epix.)	4 seasons, 40 episodes	46–60 min	Renewed for final episode
From	Science fiction horror	February 20, 2022	4 seasons, 40 episodes	45–59 min	Renewed for final season
The Institute	Supernatural horror	July 13, 2025	2 seasons, 16 episodes	54–59 min	Season 2 ongoing
Robin Hood	Historical action adventure	November 2, 2025	1 season, 10 episodes	51–65 min	Renewed
The Westies	Crime drama	July 12, 2026	1 season, 8 episodes	50–60 min	Pending
American Hostage	Thriller anthology	September 20, 2026	1 season, 8 episodes	41–55 min	Pending
Awaiting release
Bosch: Start of Watch	Police procedural	January 10, 2027	1 season, 8 episodes	TBA	Pending

=== Comedy ===
Title	Genre	Premiere	Seasons	Runtime	Status
American Classic	Comedy drama	March 1, 2026	1 season, 8 episodes	29–35 min	Pending

=== Unscripted ===
==== Docuseries ====
Title	Genre	Premiere	Seasons	Runtime	Status
Words + Music	Music	November 30, 2025	1 season, 4 episodes	50–58 min	Pending
Awaiting release
New Wave	Music	November 23, 2026	4 episodes	TBA	Miniseries

=== Co-productions ===
Title	Genre	Partner/Country	Premiere	Seasons	Runtime	Status
Rogue Heroes	Historical drama	BBC One/United Kingdom	November 13, 2022	2 seasons, 12 episodes	56–60 min	Renewed

=== Exclusive international distribution ===
These series are programs that have aired on other networks where MGM+ has bought exclusive distribution rights to stream them in alternate regions on its own platform.

Title	Genre	Original network/region	Premiere	Seasons	Runtime	Exclusive region(s)	Status
Outlander: Blood of My Blood	Historical romantic fantasy	Starz/United States	August 9, 2025	2 seasons, 20 episodes	59–80 min	United Kingdom	Season 2 ongoing
Atomic	Action drama	Sky Atlantic/United Kingdom	August 28, 2025	1 season, 5 episodes	44–46 min	Austria, Belgium, Germany, and Latin America	Pending
The Artist	Murder mystery	The Network/United States	May 1, 2026	1 season, 6 episodes	44–48 min	All other markets	Pending
Awaiting release
Secret Service	Spy thriller	ITV1/United Kingdom	November 22, 2026	1 season, 5 episodes	TBA	Italy, Latin America and North America	Pending

== Upcoming original programming ==
=== Drama ===
Title	Genre	Premiere	Seasons	Runtime	Status
Embassy	Political thriller	TBA	1 season, 6 episodes	TBA	Post-production
The Magnificent Seven	Western drama	TBA	1 season, 8 episodes	TBA	Post-production
Rules of Prey	Crime thriller	TBA	1 season, 8 episodes	TBA	Filming
The American Heiress	Historical romance	TBA	1 season, 8 episodes	TBA	Series order
The Black Tapes	Supernatural horror	TBA	1 season, 8 episodes	TBA	Series order

=== Co-productions ===
Title	Genre	Partner/Country	Premiere	Seasons	Runtime	Status
Legacy of Spies	Spy thriller	BBC/United Kingdom	TBA	1 season, 8 episodes	TBA	Post-production

=== In development ===
Title	Genre
Untitled Kurt Sutter series	Noir crime drama

== Ended programming ==
=== Drama ===
Title	Genre	Premiere	Finale	Seasons	Runtime	Notes
Berlin Station	Drama	October 16, 2016	February 17, 2019	3 seasons, 29 episodes	45–61 min	
Perpetual Grace, LTD	Neo noir thriller	June 2, 2019	August 4, 2019	1 season, 10 episodes	47–63 min	
Pennyworth	Drama	July 28, 2019	April 11, 2021	2 seasons, 20 episodes	50–71 min	(Note: Moved to HBO Max)
Chapelwaite	Horror drama	August 22, 2021	October 31, 2021	1 season, 10 episodes	46–60 min	
Billy the Kid	Western drama	April 24, 2022	November 23, 2025	3 seasons, 24 episodes	45–54 min	
Beacon 23	Science fiction thriller	November 12, 2023	May 26, 2024	2 seasons, 16 episodes	44–48 min	
Belgravia: The Next Chapter	Period drama	January 14, 2024	March 10, 2024	8 episodes	49–53 min	(Note: Miniseries)
The Emperor of Ocean Park	Mystery thriller	July 14, 2024	September 15, 2024	1 season, 10 episodes	44–57 min	
Earth Abides	Post-apocalyptic science fiction	December 1, 2024	December 29, 2024	6 episodes	45–58 min	
Nine Bodies in a Mexican Morgue	Mystery thriller	March 2, 2025	April 6, 2025	6 episodes	47–51 min	
Vanished	Mystery thriller	February 1, 2026	February 22, 2026	4 episodes	45 min	
Spider-Noir	Superhero drama	May 25, 2026		1 season, 8 episodes	42–49 min	

=== Comedy ===
Title	Genre	Premiere	Finale	Seasons	Runtime	Notes
Graves	Comedy	October 16, 2016	December 10, 2017	2 seasons, 20 episodes	28–34 min	
Get Shorty	Comedy drama	August 13, 2017	November 17, 2019	3 seasons, 27 episodes	54–64 min	
Bridge and Tunnel	Comedy drama	January 24, 2021	January 14, 2022	2 seasons, 12 episodes	28–35 min	

=== Unscripted ===
==== Docuseries ====
Title	Genre	Premiere	Finale	Seasons	Runtime	Notes
America Divided	Politics	September 30, 2016	May 25, 2018	2 seasons, 12 episodes	34–59 min	
Unprotected Sets	Stand-up comedy	October 5, 2018	March 25, 2022	3 seasons, 32 episodes	22–28 min	
Elvis Goes There	Film	February 4, 2019	February 25, 2019	4 episodes	48–55 min	
Punk	Music	March 11, 2019	April 1, 2019	4 episodes	52–57 min	
Sex Life	Sexuality	June 14, 2019	June 25, 2022	3 seasons, 22 episodes	45–59 min	
NFL: The Grind	Football	September 11, 2019	January 6, 2021	2 seasons, 33 episodes	28–29 min	
Slow Burn	Politics/True crime	February 16, 2020	March 22, 2020	1 season, 6 episodes	58–59 min	
Laurel Canyon	Music	May 31, 2020	June 7, 2020	2 episodes	78–79 min	
Helter Skelter: An American Myth	True crime	July 26, 2020	August 30, 2020	6 episodes	54–62 min	
Enslaved	History	September 14, 2020	October 19, 2020	6 episodes	52 min	
By Whatever Means Necessary: The Times of Godfather of Harlem	History	November 8, 2020	November 29, 2020	4 episodes	48–51 min	
Fall River	True crime	May 16, 2021	May 30, 2021	4 episodes	58–60 min	
Fiasco	History	September 19, 2021	October 24, 2021	1 season, 6 episodes	48–57 min	
NFL Icons	Sports	October 2, 2021	February 7, 2025	4 seasons, 24 episodes	44–45 min	
Mr. A & Mr. M: The Story of A&M Records	Music	December 5, 2021	December 12, 2021	2 episodes	50–54 min	
Women Who Rock	Music	July 10, 2022	July 31, 2022	4 episodes	54–57 min	
My Life as a Rolling Stone	Music	August 4, 2022	August 28, 2022	4 episodes	59 min	
Blumhouse's Compendium of Horror	Film	October 2, 2022	October 30, 2022	5 episodes	45–52 min	
Murf the Surf	True crime	February 5, 2023	March 5, 2023	4 episodes	45–50 min	
Amityville: An Origin Story	Paranormal	April 23, 2023	May 14, 2023	4 episodes	48–54 min	
San Francisco Sounds: A Place in Time	Music	August 20, 2023	August 27, 2023	2 episodes	72–74 min	
Psycho: The Lost Tapes of Ed Gein	True crime	September 17, 2023	October 8, 2023	4 episodes	44–56 min	
In Restless Dreams: The Music of Paul Simon	Music	March 17, 2024	March 24, 2024	2 episodes	96–116 min	
Hollywood Black	African-American culture/Film	August 11, 2024	September 1, 2024	4 episodes	56–60 min	
The Wonderland Massacre & the Secret History of Hollywood	True crime	September 8, 2024	September 29, 2024	4 episodes	50–55 min	
Beyond: UFOs and the Unknown	Extraterrestrials	October 27, 2024	November 17, 2024	4 episodes	50–56 min	
Let the Devil In	Paranormal/True crime	August 31, 2025	September 21, 2025	4 episodes	45 min	
The Hillside Strangler	True crime	January 18, 2026	February 8, 2026	4 episodes	52 min	

==== Variety ====
Title	Genre	Premiere	Finale	Seasons	Runtime	Notes
The Eisen Hour	Talk show	January 23, 2021	February 27, 2021	1 season, 6 episodes	55–58 min	

=== Co-productions ===
Title	Genre	Partner/Country	Premiere	Finale	Seasons	Runtime	Notes
Deep State	Espionage thriller	Fox/United Kingdom	June 17, 2018	June 23, 2019	2 seasons, 16 episodes	47–58 min	
The Truth About the Harry Quebert Affair	Drama	Sky Witness/United Kingdom	September 4, 2018	December 20, 2018	10 episodes	50–57 min	
War of the Worlds	Science fiction drama	Canal+/France; Fox/United Kingdom (season 1); Star/United Kingdom (seasons 2–3)	February 16, 2020	October 30, 2022	3 seasons, 24 episodes	44–52 min	
Britannia (seasons 2–3) (Note: The first season was a co-production between Sky Atlantic and Amazon Prime Video.)	Historical fantasy drama	Sky Atlantic/United Kingdom	October 4, 2020	March 6, 2022	3 seasons, 27 episodes	42–46 min	
Belgravia	Period drama	ITV/United Kingdom	April 12, 2020	May 17, 2020	6 episodes	47–49 min	
Domina	Historical drama	Sky Atlantic/United Kingdom; Sky Atlantic/Italy	May 14, 2021	August 13, 2023	2 seasons, 16 episodes	48–60 min	
A Spy Among Friends	Historical thriller	ITVX/United Kingdom	March 12, 2023	April 16, 2023	6 episodes	53–60 min	
The Winter King	Historical drama	ITVX/United Kingdom	August 20, 2023	November 5, 2023	1 season, 10 episodes	50–60 min	
Hotel Cocaine	Crime thriller	Stan/Australia	June 16, 2024	August 4, 2024	1 season, 8 episodes	46–59 min	
A Tale of Two Cities	Historical drama	BBC/United Kingdom	September 6, 2026	October 4, 2026	4 episodes	50–69 min	
Treasure Island	Historical adventure	Paramount+/United Kingdom	October 11, 2026	November 15, 2026	6 episodes	44–49 min	

=== Continuations ===
Title	Genre	Prev. network(s)	Premiere	Finale	Seasons	Runtime	Notes
The Contender (season 5)	Reality competition	NBC (season 1); ESPN (seasons 2–3); Versus (season 4)	August 24, 2018	November 9, 2018	1 season, 12 episodes	58–59 min	
Condor (season 2)	Thriller	Audience	November 7, 2021	December 26, 2021	1 season, 10 episodes	47–53 min	

=== Exclusive international distribution ===
Title	Genre	Original network/region	Premiere	Seasons	Runtime	Exclusive region(s)	Notes
Power Book II: Ghost (seasons 3–4) (Note: Season 3 premiered exclusively on MGM+ only in Austria, Belgium, Germany, Italy, Netherlands and Spain.)	Crime drama	Starz/United States	April 9, 2023 (Note: Austria, Belgium, Germany, Italy, Netherlands, and Spain); June 9, 2024 (Note: Latin America and United Kingdom)	4 seasons, 40 episodes	56–68 min	All other markets	
Blindspotting (season 2)	Comedy drama	Starz/United States	April 16, 2023; April 1, 2024 (Note: Latin America)	2 seasons, 16 episodes	30–34 min	All other markets except United Kingdom	
Run the World (season 2)	Comedy	Starz/United States	May 28, 2023; April 1, 2024	2 seasons, 16 episodes	26–30 min	All other markets except United Kingdom	
Heels (season 2)	Drama	Starz/United States	July 30, 2023; April 1, 2024	2 seasons, 16 episodes	57–62 min	All other markets except United Kingdom	
Power Book IV: Force (seasons 2–3) (Note: Only season 3 premiered exclusively in the UK)	Crime drama	Starz/United States	September 3, 2023; April 1, 2024; November 8, 2025 (Note: United Kingdom)	2 seasons, 20 episodes	48–57 min	All other markets	
Shining Vale (season 2)	Satirical comedy horror	Starz/United States	October 15, 2023	2 seasons, 16 episodes	43–46 min	European markets except the United Kingdom	(Note: These shows were previously available to stream, but have been since removed from the service.)
Power Book III: Raising Kanan (seasons 3–5)	Crime drama	Starz/United States	December 3, 2023; April 1, 2024; May 20, 2024	3 seasons, 28 episodes	50–63 min	All other markets	
Hightown (season 3)	Crime drama	Starz/United States	January 28, 2024; April 1, 2024; July 1, 2024	3 seasons, 25 episodes	54–59 min	All other markets	
BMF (seasons 3–4)	Crime drama	Starz/United States	March 3, 2024; April 1, 2024; May 20, 2024	4 seasons, 38 episodes	50–53 min	All other markets	
The Serpent Queen (season 2)	Historical drama	Starz/United States	July 14, 2024	2 seasons, 16 episodes	49–70 min	All other markets	
Outlander (season 7B–8)	Historical romantic fantasy	Starz/United States	November 23, 2024	2 seasons, 18 episodes	53–90 min	United Kingdom	
Spartacus: House of Ashur	Historical drama	Starz/United States	December 6, 2025	1 season, 10 episodes	51–63 min	All other markets	

=== Regional original programming ===
These shows are originals because MGM+ commissioned or acquired them and had their premiere on the MGM+ service, but they are not available worldwide.

Title	Genre	Premiere	Seasons	Runtime	Exclusive region(s)	Language	Notes
Borderline	Crime drama	September 2, 2024	1 season, 6 episodes	45–49 min	United Kingdom	English	

== Original films ==
=== Scripted ===
Title	Genre	Release date	Runtime
The Deep House	Horror	November 5, 2021	1 h 25 min
A House on the Bayou	Horror	November 19, 2021	1 h 28 min
American Refugee	Horror	December 10, 2021	1 h 34 min
Torn Hearts	Horror	May 20, 2022	1 h 37 min
Unhuman	Horror	June 3, 2022	1 h 30 min
The Visitor	Horror	October 7, 2022	1 h 29 min
There's Something Wrong with the Children	Horror	January 17, 2023	1 h 32 min
Unseen	Horror	May 19, 2023	1 h 16 min
The Passenger	Horror	August 4, 2023	1 h 34 min

=== Documentaries ===
Title	Release date	Runtime
William Shatner's Get a Life!	July 28, 2012	58 min
Filthy Gorgeous: The Bob Guccione Story	November 8, 2013	1 h 34 min
The Improv: 50 Years Behind the Brick Wall	December 6, 2013	58 min
Personal with Bill Rhoden: Grant and Calvin Hill	June 11, 2014	30 min
Back Issues: The Hustler Magazine Story	July 15, 2014	1 h 29 min
Altman	August 6, 2014	1 h 35 min
Personal with Bill Rhoden: Oscar De La Hoya	August 19, 2014	29 min
To Russia With Love	October 24, 2014	1 h 20 min
Deep Web	May 31, 2015	1 h 30 min
Doped: The Dirty Side of Sports	September 30, 2015	1 hour
The 4%: Film's Gender Problem	March 8, 2016	28 min
Under the Gun	May 15, 2016	1 h 45 min
Serena	June 22, 2016	1 h 35 min
Election Day: Lens Across America	January 17, 2017	57 min
Straight/Curve: Redefining Body Image	June 21, 2017	1 h 22 min
Foreman	September 13, 2017	1 h 24 min
Danica	November 8, 2017	1 h 6 min
The Panama Papers	November 26, 2018	1 h 40 min

=== Stand-up comedy specials ===
Title	Release date	Runtime
Dennis Miller: America 180	June 13, 2014	60 min
Lisa Lampanelli: Back to the Drawing Board	June 26, 2015	60 min
Craig Ferguson: Just Being Honest	September 10, 2015	75 min
Marc Maron: More Later	December 4, 2015	75 min
Michael Ian Black: Noted Expert	May 13, 2016	60 min
What Happened... Ms. Sykes?	October 21, 2016	59 min
Tom Papa: Human Mule	December 9, 2016	59 min
Nick Offerman and Megan Mullally – Summer of 69: No Apostrophe	May 19, 2017	55 min
Anjelah Johnson: Mahalo & Goodnight	September 29, 2017	59 min
