= Patti LuPone =

American actress and singer (born 1949)

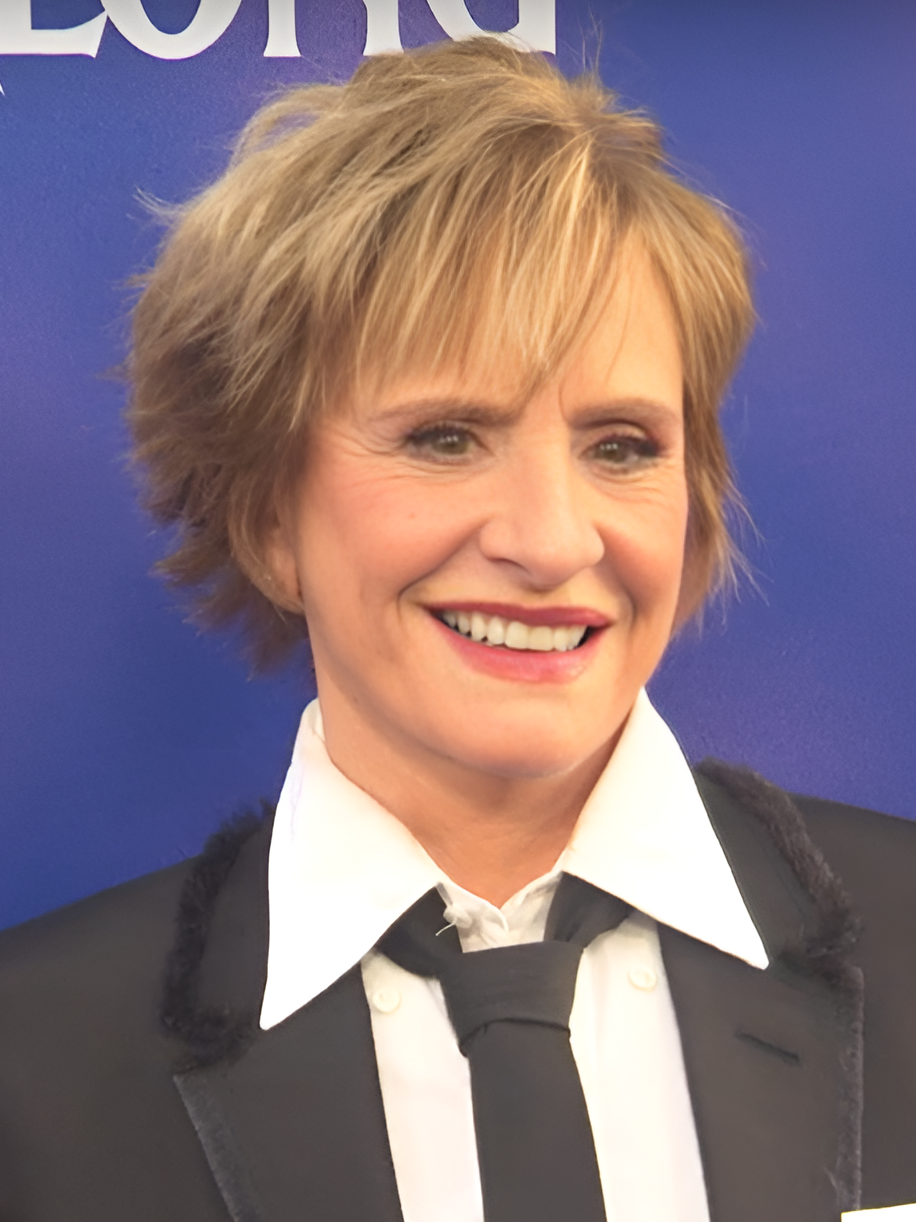
- LuPone in 2024
- Born: April 21, 1949 (age 77); Northport, New York, U.S.
- Citizenship: United States; Italy
- Education: Juilliard School (BFA)
- Occupations: Actress, singer
- Years active: 1971–present
- Spouse: Matthew Johnston (m. 1988)
- Children: 1
- Relatives: Robert LuPone (brother); Adelina Patti (great-great aunt)
- Awards: Full list
- Website: pattilupone.net

Patti Ann LuPone (born April 21, 1949) is an American actress and singer. After starting her professional career with The Acting Company in 1972, she soon gained acclaim for her leading performances on the Broadway and West End stage. Known for playing bold, resilient women in musical theater, she has received numerous accolades, including three Tony Awards, two Laurence Olivier Awards and two Grammy Awards. She was inducted to the American Theater Hall of Fame in 2006.

She made her Broadway debut in Three Sisters in 1973. She went on to receive three Tony Awards: two for Best Actress in a Musical for her roles as Eva Perón in Tim Rice and Andrew Lloyd Webber's Evita (1980) and Rose in Gypsy (2008) and one for Best Featured Actress in a Musical for playing Joanne in the Stephen Sondheim revival Company (2022). She was Tony-nominated for The Robber Bridegroom (1975), Anything Goes (1988), Sweeney Todd: The Demon Barber of Fleet Street (2006), Women on the Verge of a Nervous Breakdown (2010), and War Paint (2017).

For her performances on the West End stage she received two Laurence Olivier Awards: one for Best Actress in a Musical for her performances as Fantine in the original London cast of Les Misérables and Moll in The Cradle Will Rock in 1985, and the second for Best Actress in a Supporting Role in a Musical for Company in 2019. She was nominated for her role as Norma Desmond in Sunset Boulevard in 1993. She has two Grammy Awards for the recording of the 2007 Los Angeles Opera production of Rise and Fall of the City of Mahagonny.

On television, she starred in the drama series Life Goes On (1989–1993). She is a two-time Emmy Award Nominee for The Song Spinner (1995) and Frasier (1998). She acted in three Ryan Murphy series: American Horror Story (2013–2014, 2022), Pose (2019), and Hollywood (2020). She also acted in Oz (2003), Will & Grace (2005), 30 Rock (2009–2012), Glee (2011), Girls (2014) Crazy Ex-Girlfriend (2017), Steven Universe (2016–2019), Penny Dreadful (2014–2016), Agatha All Along (2024), And Just Like That... (2025), The Artist (2025), Palm Royale (2025) and Elsbeth (2026). LuPone's film roles include 1941 (1979), Witness (1985), Driving Miss Daisy (1989), Summer of Sam (1999), State and Main (2000), Heist (2001), and Beau Is Afraid (2023).

== Early life and education ==
LuPone was born on April 21, 1949 in Northport, New York, on Long Island, the daughter of Italian-American parents Angela Louise (née Patti), a library administrator at the C. W. Post Campus of Long Island University and Orlando Joseph LuPone, a school administrator and English teacher at Walt Whitman High School in Huntington, NY. Her great-great aunt was 19th-century Spanish-born Italian opera singer Adelina Patti. Her father's side came from Abruzzo, while her mother's side is Sicilian. Lucille Ball was a family friend, having attended grade school with LuPone's mother. Her older brother Robert LuPone was a Tony-nominated actor, dancer, and director who originated the role of Zach, the director, in A Chorus Line. She grew up Catholic. LuPone is a dual citizen of Italy and the United States.

LuPone was part of the first graduating class of Juilliard's Drama Division (1968–1972: Group 1), which also included actors Kevin Kline and David Ogden Stiers. She graduated from Juilliard in 1972 with a Bachelor of Fine Arts degree. According to LuPone, her rigorous Juilliard training has instilled in her "a respect for the craft of acting and the stage" but said it did little to prepare her for the realities of pursuing a career on Broadway. LuPone has a mezzo-soprano vocal range, and she is known for her strong/high "Broadway" belt singing voice. In a 2008 interview, she maintained that she was "an actor who sings" and thankful she "had a voice".

== Career ==
=== 1970–1979: Early roles and breakthrough ===
In 1972, LuPone became one of the original members of The Acting Company, formed by John Houseman. The Acting Company is a nationally touring repertory theater company. LuPone's stint with the company lasted from 1972 to 1976 and she appeared in many of their productions, such as The Cradle Will Rock, The School for Scandal, Women Beware Women, The Beggar's Opera, The Time of Your Life, The Lower Depths, The Hostage, Next Time I'll Sing to You, Measure for Measure, Scapin, Edward II, The Orchestra, Love's Labours Lost, Arms and the Man and The Way of the World. She made her Broadway debut in the play The Three Sisters as Irina in 1973. For her work in The Robber Bridegroom (1975) she received her first Tony Award nomination, for Best Featured Actress in a Musical. The Acting Company honored LuPone on March 12, 2012 in an event called "Patti's Turn" at the Kaye Playhouse.

In 1976, theater producer David Merrick hired LuPone as a replacement to play Genevieve, the title role of the troubled pre-Broadway production of The Baker's Wife. The production toured at length but Merrick deemed it unworthy of Broadway and it closed out of town.

Since 1977, LuPone has frequently collaborated with David Mamet, appearing in his plays The Woods, All Men Are Whores, The Blue Hour, The Water Engine (1978), Edmond, The Old Neighborhood (1997), and The Anarchist (2012). The New York Times reviewer wrote of LuPone in The Old Neighborhood, "Those who know Ms. LuPone only as a musical comedy star will be stunned by the naturalistic fire she delivers here. As Jolly, a part inspired by Mr. Mamet's real-life sister and his realized female character, Ms. LuPone finds conflicting layers of past and present selves in practically every line. She emerges as both loving matriarch and wounded adolescent, sentimental and devastatingly clear-eyed." In 1978, she appeared in the Broadway musical adaptation of Studs Terkel's Working, which ran for only 24 performances.

=== 1979–1999: Evita and Broadway stardom ===
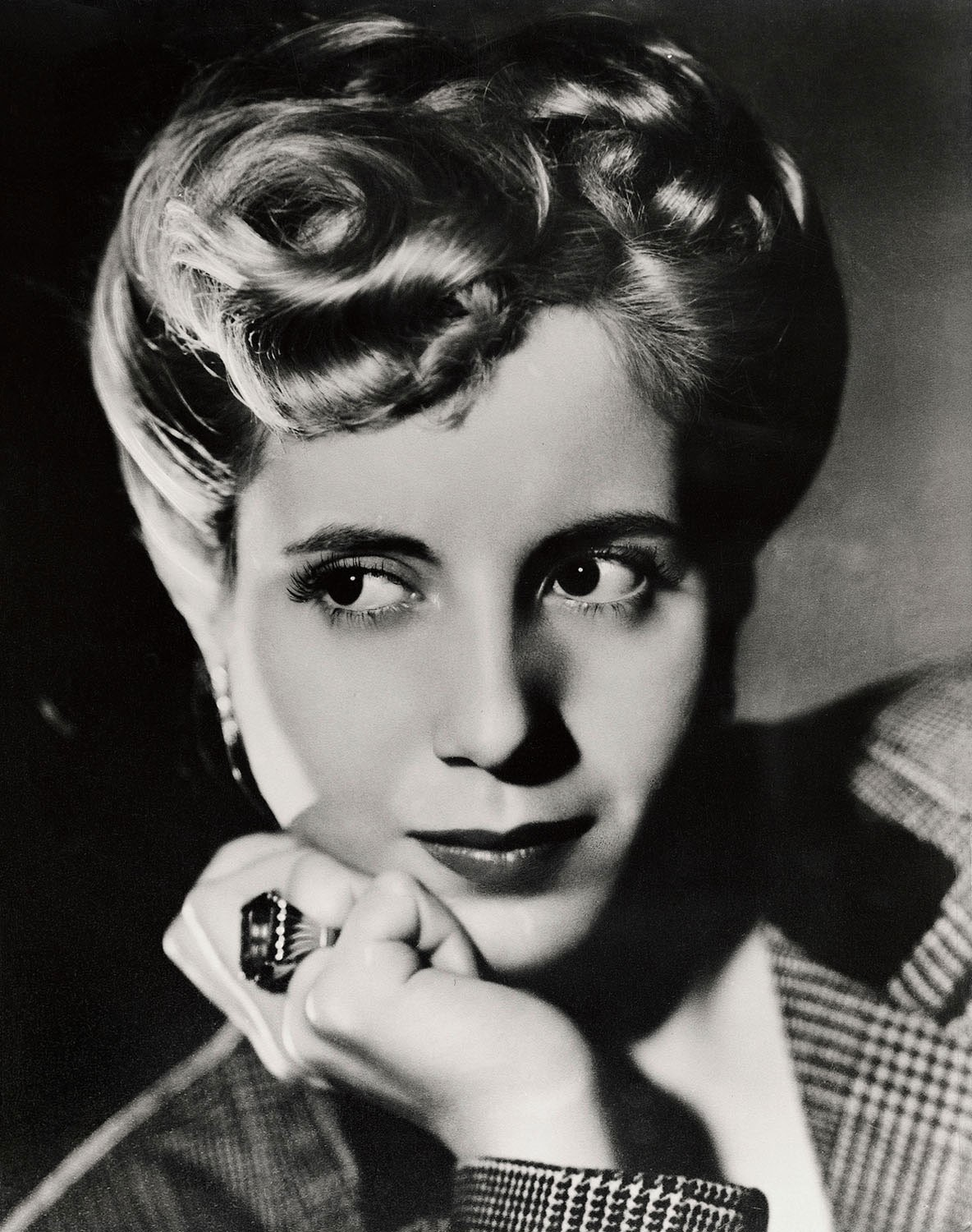
LuPone gained stardom for her portrayal of Eva Perón in Evita (1979.)

In 1979, LuPone starred in the original Broadway production of Evita, the musical based on the life of Eva Perón, composed by Andrew Lloyd Webber and Tim Rice and directed by Harold Prince. She reportedly won the role over 200 auditionees, including Meryl Streep, Ann-Margret and Raquel Welch. Although LuPone was praised by critics, she has since said that her time in Evita was not an enjoyable one. In a 2007 interview, she stated "Evita was the worst experience of my life," she said. "I was screaming my way through a part that could only have been written by a man who hates women. And I had no support from the producers, who wanted a star performance onstage but treated me as an unknown backstage. It was like Beirut and I fought like a banshee." Despite the trouble, LuPone won her first Tony Award for Best Actress in a Musical. "Don't Cry For Me, Argentina", a song she performed for the show, became one of her signature songs throughout her career. It was not until she had reprised the role in a production in Sydney when she had finally enjoyed the part and felt comfortable singing the score. LuPone and her co-star, Mandy Patinkin, remained close friends both on and off the stage.

In 1980, LuPone's cabaret act, "Patti LuPone at Les Mouches," played for 27 consecutive weeks on Saturday evenings at midnight following her 8pm performance in Evita. The New York Daily News reviewed saying, "Anyone who thinks there are no volcanoes in New York should check out Les Mouches any Saturday midnight in March. It’s here at the witching hour that Patti LuPone fulminates, thunders and showers the room with sparks of her debut cabaret act." In 2008, a restored recording was released as an album by Ghostlight Records.

In 1983, John Cassavetes and LuPone workshopped a production of a play called Thornhill by Meade Roberts. The play, directed by Cassavetes, starred LuPone as Eugene O'Neill's wife Carlotta Monterey, and Cassavetes as O'Neill. The production also featured cast members Ben Gazzara and Carol Kane.

Also in 1983, LuPone starred as Rosalind opposite Val Kilmer in As You Like It at the Guthrie Theatre directed by Liviu Ciulei. In the same year, founding alumni of The Acting Company reunited for an off-Broadway revival of Marc Blitzstein's landmark labor musical The Cradle Will Rock at the American Place Theater. It was narrated by John Houseman with LuPone in the roles of Moll and Sister Mister. The production premiered at The Acting Company's summer residence at Chautauqua Institution, toured the United States including an engagement at the Highland Park, Illinois' Ravinia Festival in 1984 and played in London's West End.

When the run ended, LuPone remained in London to create the role of Fantine in Cameron Mackintosh's original London production of Les Misérables, in 1985, which premiered at the Barbican Theatre at that time the London home of the Royal Shakespeare Company. LuPone had previously worked for Mackintosh in a short-lived Broadway revival of Oliver! in 1984, playing Nancy opposite Ron Moody as Fagin. For her work in both The Cradle Will Rock and Les Misérables, LuPone received the 1985 Olivier Award for Best Actress in a Musical, making LuPone the first American actor or actress to win an Olivier Award.

She returned to Broadway in 1987 to star as nightclub singer Reno Sweeney in the Lincoln Center Theater revival of Cole Porter's Anything Goes. Starring opposite Howard McGillin, they both received Tony nominations for their performances. The Lincoln Center cast reassembled for a one-night-only concert performance of Anything Goes in New York in 2002.

Among LuPone's film credits are Fighting Back, Witness, Steven Universe: The Movie, Just Looking, The Victim, Summer of Sam, Driving Miss Daisy, King of the Gypsies, 1941, Wise Guys, Nancy Savoca's The 24 Hour Woman and Savoca's Union Square, Family Prayers and City by the Sea. She has also worked with playwright David Mamet on his films State and Main and Heist. In 1987, LuPone starred as Lady Bird Johnson in the TV movie, LBJ: The Early Years (1987).

LuPone played Libby Thatcher on the television drama Life Goes On, which ran on ABC from 1989 to 1993. In the 1990s she had a recurring role as defense attorney Ruth Miller on Law & Order. She has twice been nominated for an Emmy Award: for the TV movie The Song Spinner (1995, Daytime Emmy Award nominee), and the Primetime Emmy Award for Outstanding Guest Actress in a Comedy Series on Frasier in 1998. She had a cameo as herself that year on an episode of Saturday Night Live hosted by Kelsey Grammer.

In 1993, LuPone returned to London to create the role of Norma Desmond in the original production of Andrew Lloyd Webber's Sunset Boulevard at the Adelphi Theater. There was much anticipation of LuPone appearing in another Lloyd Webber musical, the first since her performance in Evita. Her time in the show was difficult and she was abruptly fired by Lloyd Webber. Lloyd Webber then selected Glenn Close to open the show in Los Angeles and eventually on Broadway, despite LuPone being contracted to open both productions. She says she was essentially blacklisted in Hollywood after the Sunset Boulevard debacle due to rumors that she had been difficult to work with in New York. In 1994 she had a successful surgery on her vocal cords performed in Philadelphia by surgeon Robert Sataloff.

In November 1995, LuPone starred in her one-woman show, Patti LuPone on Broadway, at the Walter Kerr Theatre. For her work, she received an Outer Critics Circle Award. The following year, she was selected by producer Robert Whitehead to succeed his wife, Zoe Caldwell in the Broadway production of Terrence McNally's play Master Class based on the master classes given by operatic diva Maria Callas at Juilliard. LuPone received positive reviews, with Vincent Canby writing "Ms. LuPone really is vulnerable here in a way that wasn't anticipated: she's in the process of creating a role for which she isn't ideally suited but she's working like a trouper to get it right." She appeared in the play to acclaim in the West End.

=== 2000–2009: Sondheim revivals and acclaim ===
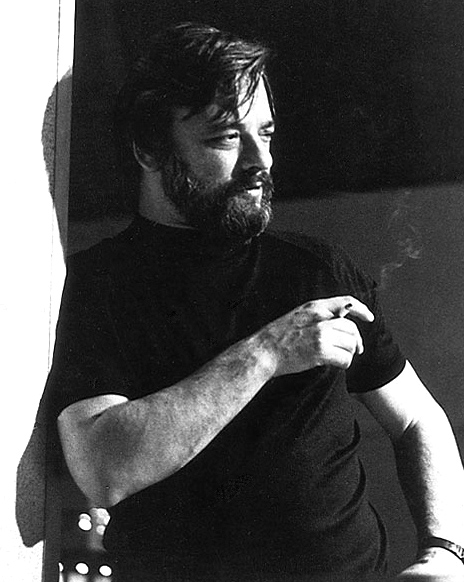
LuPone starred in acclaimed revivals of Stephen Sondheim's musicals Gypsy and Sweeney Todd.

In November 2001, she starred in a Broadway revival of Noises Off, with Peter Gallagher and Faith Prince. LuPone has performed in many New York concert productions of musicals including Pal Joey with Peter Gallagher and Bebe Neuwirth, Annie Get Your Gun with Peter Gallagher, Sweeney Todd with George Hearn in both New York and San Francisco, Anything Goes with Howard McGillin, Can-Can with Michael Nouri for City Center Encores!, Candide with Kristin Chenoweth, Passion with Michael Cerveris and Audra McDonald and Gypsy with Boyd Gaines and Laura Benanti for City Center Encores!. Her performances in Sweeney Todd, and Candide were recorded and broadcast for PBSs Great Performances and were released on DVD. The concert staging of Passion was televised as part of Live from Lincoln Center. Since 2001, LuPone has been a regular performer at the Chicago Ravinia Festival. She starred in a six-year-long series of concert presentations of Stephen Sondheim musicals, which began in honor of his seventieth birthday. Her roles there have included Mrs. Lovett in Sweeney Todd, Fosca in Passion, Cora Hoover Hooper in Anyone Can Whistle, Rose in Gypsy and two different roles in Sunday in the Park with George.

LuPone's television work also included a recurring role on her cousin Tom Fontana's HBO series in its final season, Oz (2003). She appeared as herself on a February 2005 episode of Will & Grace. She also appeared on the series Ugly Betty in March 2007 as the mother of Marc St. James (played by Michael Urie). LuPone had a recurring guest role as Frank Rossitano's mother on 30 Rock. LuPone appeared as herself in the season two finale of the television series Glee.

She returned to Broadway in October 2005 to star as Mrs. Lovett in John Doyle's new Broadway production of Sweeney Todd. In this radically different interpretation of the musical, the ten actors on stage also served as the show's orchestra, and LuPone played the tuba and orchestra bells as well as performing the score vocally. For her performance, she received a Tony Award nomination as well as Golden Icon Award for Best Female Musical Theater Performance. In August 2006, LuPone took a three-week leave from Sweeney Todd in order to play Rose in Lonny Price's production of Gypsy at Ravinia. Sweeney Todd closed in September 2006.

On February 10, 2007, LuPone starred with Audra McDonald in the Los Angeles Opera production of Kurt Weill's opera Rise and Fall of the City of Mahagonny directed by John Doyle. The cast recording of Rise and Fall of the City of Mahagonny was recognized at the 51st Grammy Awards as Best Classical Album and Best Opera Recording in February 2009.

Following the Ravinia Festival production of Gypsy, LuPone and author Arthur Laurents mended a decade-long rift, and she was cast in the City Center Encores! Summer Stars production of the show. Laurents directed LuPone in Gypsy for a 22-performance run (July 9, 2007 – July 29, 2007) at City Center. This production of Gypsy then transferred to Broadway, opening March 27, 2008 at the St. James Theatre. LuPone won the Outer Critics Circle Award, Drama League Award, Drama Desk Award and Tony Award for her performance in Gypsy. It closed on January 11, 2009. During the penultimate performance of Gypsy on January 10, 2009, LuPone interrupted her performance of "Rose's Turn" to address an audience member using a flash camera, a violation of theater etiquette. After the patron was removed, LuPone resumed her performance to applause. This incident, captured on video and widely circulated online, sparked a broader discussion about the impact of audience distractions on live theater.

=== 2010–2019: Career expansion ===
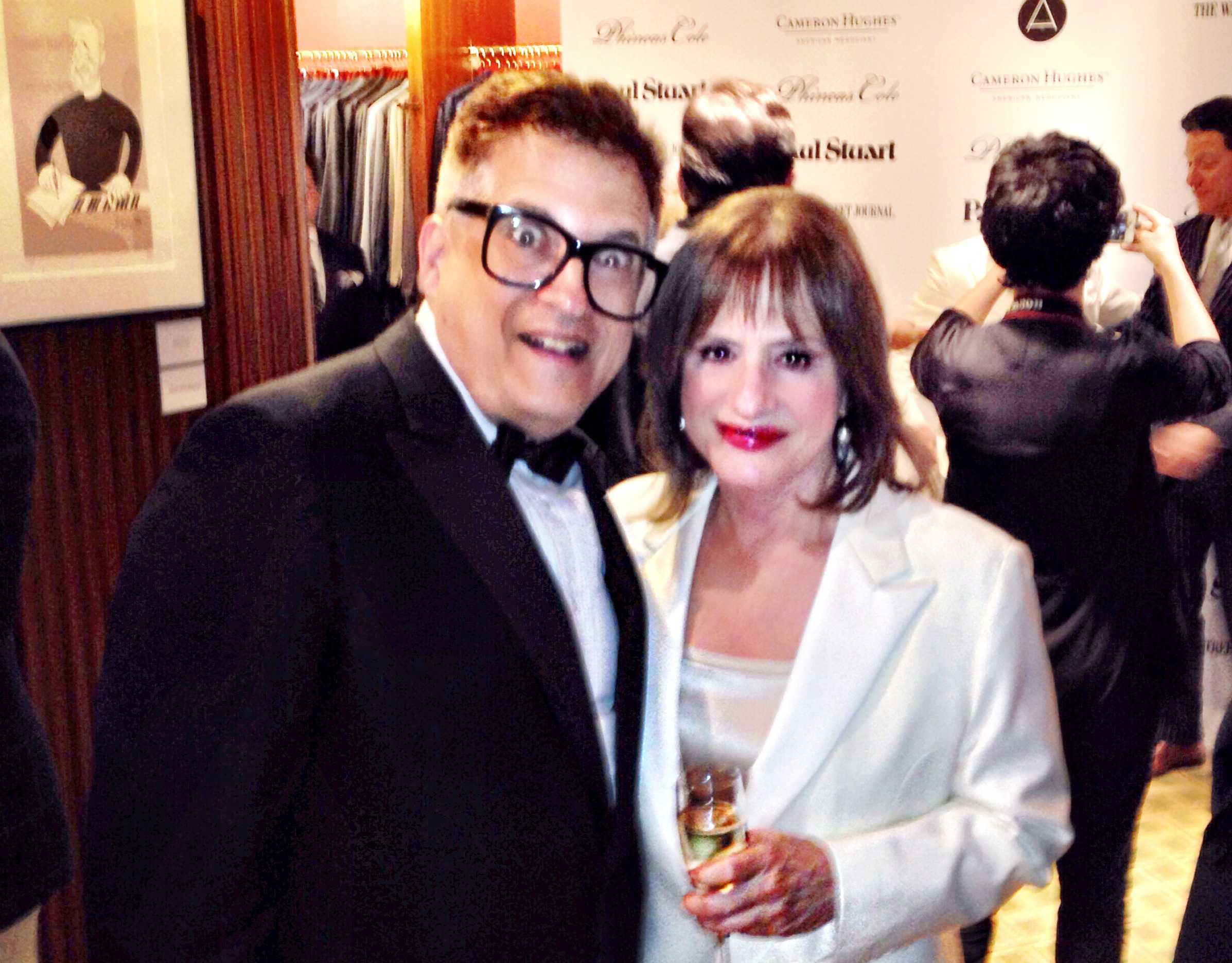
LuPone with artist Ken Fallin at The Wall Street Journal's Tony Awards party, which LuPone hosted and at which Fallin's work was auctioned for charity

In August 2010, LuPone appeared in a three-day run of Irving Berlin's Annie Get Your Gun where she played the title role opposite Patrick Cassidy at the Ravinia Festival, directed by Lonny Price. That same year, LuPone created the role of Lucia in the original Broadway production of Women on the Verge of a Nervous Breakdown, which opened at the Belasco Theater on November 4, 2010, and closed on January 2, 2011, after 23 preview and 69 regular performances. LuPone was nominated for a Tony and Drama Desk, and an Outer Critics Circle Award for her performance. LuPone's memoir recounting her life and career from childhood onwards, was published in September 2010 titled Patti LuPone: A Memoir. It was a New York Times Best Seller.

In 2011, LuPone played the role of Joanne in a four-night limited engagement concert production of Stephen Sondheim's musical Company at the New York Philharmonic, conducted by Paul Gemignani. The production starred Neil Patrick Harris as Bobby. Harris had previously worked with LuPone in the 2000 and 2001 concert productions of Sweeney Todd. The cast of Company performed the song "Side by Side by Side" at the 65th Tony Awards on June 12, 2011. LuPone made her New York City Ballet debut in May 2011 in a production of The Seven Deadly Sins directed and choreographed by Lynne Taylor-Corbett. A piece she had previously performed, LuPone sang the role of Anna in the Kurt Weill and Bertolt Brecht score. LuPone concluded a 63-performance Broadway engagement of her concert with former Evita co-star Mandy Patinkin entitled An Evening with Patti LuPone and Mandy Patinkin. The run started on November 21, 2011, at the Ethel Barrymore Theater and ended on January 13, 2012. In late 2012, LuPone appeared with Debra Winger in the premiere of David Mamet's play The Anarchist.

In 2011, the feature film Union Square, co-written and directed by the Sundance Film Festival's Grand Jury Award Winner, Nancy Savoca, was premiered at the Toronto International Film Festival. In it, LuPone co-starred with Mira Sorvino, Tammy Blanchard, Mike Doyle, Michael Rispoli and Daphne Rubin-Vega. LuPone guest starred on Army Wives on July 8, 2012. She reunited with fellow guest star Kellie Martin as her mother once again. LuPone appeared in the 2013 film Parker, an action-thriller. She voiced the character Yellow Diamond in the animated series Steven Universe (2013–2019) and Steven Universe Future (2019–2020). In 2013, LuPone was cast in the third season of the FX series American Horror Story as Joan Ramsey, a religious mother with a hidden past, and played herself in the third season of HBO's Girls.

In 2015, she appeared in several episodes of the Showtime horror series Penny Dreadful as a cantankerous yet powerful white witch. For her performance she received a nomination for the Critics Choice Award.She returned to the show in 2016 in the role of Dr. Seward, an alienist aiding Eva Green's character. Seward is an adaptation of John Seward from Bram Stoker's Dracula, and claims to be a descendant of Joan Clayton, the character LuPone portrayed in the second season. Also in 2016, she began appearing in Steven Universe as the voice of Yellow Diamond, reprising the role in the movie and the epilogue series Steven Universe Future.

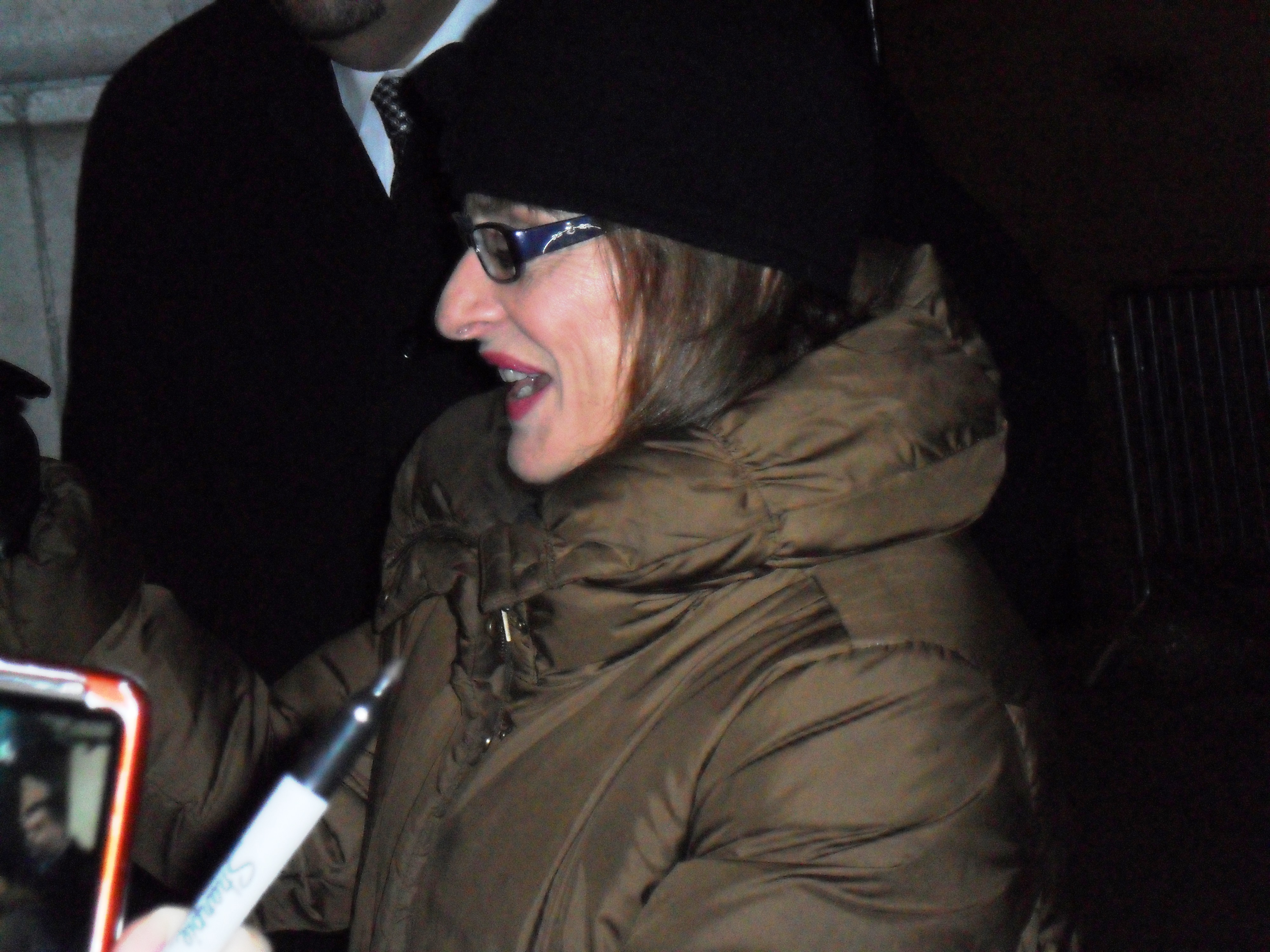
Patti LuPone on January 13, 2012, outside the Ethel Barrymore Theatre

In early 2015, she returned to Los Angeles Opera to perform the role of Samira in a new production of John Corigliano's The Ghosts of Versailles, receiving positive reviews. In April 2016, an audio recording of the production was released by Pentatone (PTC 5186538, a 2-SACD album). It won the 2017 Grammy Awards for Best Classical Album and for Best Opera Recording. In June 2015, LuPone appeared in the Douglas Carter Beane play Shows for Days at Lincoln Center Theater. LuPone again received media attention for an incident during a Shows for Days performance when she confiscated a patron's cellphone after they were observed using it during the show; it was returned after the performance. LuPone expressed frustration with audience members who disrupt performances with their phones, stating, "We work hard on stage to create a world that is being totally destroyed by a few, rude, self-absorbed and inconsiderate audience members who are controlled by their phones." In October 2015, LuPone, along with the current Fantine on the West End, joined her castmates to celebrate the 30th anniversary of Les Misérables.

In 2017, LuPone originated the role of Helena Rubinstein in the musical War Paint on Broadway, after performing the role in the summer of 2016 in the musical's world premiere at Chicago's Goodman Theatre. Performing opposite Christine Ebersole as Rubinstein's longtime competitor Elizabeth Arden, LuPone stayed with the role for War Paint's entire run at the Nederlander Theatre, from March 7 to November 5, 2017. The show closed prematurely to allow LuPone to undergo hip surgery. LuPone disclosed in an interview that War Paint would be her last musical on stage: "I'm too old. It's been hard—it's been harder than it's ever been. I can't do it anymore." Nevertheless, in September 2017 it was announced that LuPone would star as Joanne in the 2018 London revival of Company alongside Rosalie Craig as Bobbie in a gender-swapped production directed by Marianne Elliot. For her performance she received her second Laurence Olivier Award, this time for Outstanding Actress in a Supporting Role in a Musical. In August 2019, it was announced that the production would move to Broadway, with LuPone returning as Joanne and Katrina Lenk as Bobbie.

In 2019, LuPone played an antagonistic role in Pose, appearing in second season of the series. In 2020, LuPone starred in the Ryan Murphy series Hollywood for Netflix. The following year she teamed up with social media star Randy Rainbow to perform a duet song criticizing Donald Trump three weeks before the 2020 United States presidential election.

=== 2020–present ===
A transfer of the successful West End production of Company was set to open at the Bernard B. Jacobs Theatre on March 22, 2020, coinciding with Stephen Sondheim's 90th birthday, but was postponed due to the COVID-19 pandemic. The production returned, featuring LuPone starring opposite Katrina Lenk, with previews starting on November 15, 2021, before officially opening December 9, 2021. LuPone won her third Tony Award for the role. On May 10, 2022, during a live conversation with the American Theatre Wing and her Company co-stars, Patti LuPone publicly addressed a patron who was not wearing their face mask properly, a violation of Broadway League COVID-19 safety protocols. LuPone later explained that the patron had already been warned by theater staff and had responded dismissively. Her passionate response highlighted the importance of adhering to safety guidelines to ensure the continued operation of Broadway. This incident led to increased attention on safety protocols and a subsequent extension of the mask mandate by the Broadway League, from May 31 to June 30, 2022. Following the closing of Company, LuPone resigned from Actors' Equity Association, the union for professional stage managers and actors in the United States.

In 2023 she played Beau's mother, Mona, in the Ari Aster surrealist horror film Beau Is Afraid. The film stars Joaquin Phoenix, Nathan Lane, Richard Kind, and Amy Ryan. LuPone received critical acclaim for her performance with David Rooney of The Hollywood Reporter writing "[the film] features fabulous performances...most of all, LuPone in all her magnificent, scenery-chomping glory." Anthony Lane of The New Yorker also praised LuPone performance, comparing her role of an imperious mother to that of Angela Lansbury's in The Manchurian Candidate (1962).

In 2023, LuPone played the role of Lilia Calderu, a centuries-old witch with divination powers, in the Marvel Cinematic Universe Disney+ series Agatha All Along. Calderu is a Romani character in the comics. The series received mostly positive reviews from critics, with LuPone's performance in her character's central episode, "Death's Hand in Mine", being particularly praised. In 2025, Lupone's performance as Lilia Calderu received nominations for the Independent Spirit Award and the Critics Choice Award.

In 2024, LuPone returned to Broadway in The Roommate starring opposite Mia Farrow at the Booth Theatre.

In 2025, LuPone played Gianna "Gia" Ammato on And Just Like That (a sequel series to Sex and the City) she also appeared as a castmember in Season 2 of Palm Royale. and starred in The Network's limited series The Artist.

In 2026, LuPone guest-starred as Ruby Lane in the CBS comedy-drama series Elsbeth. Also in 2006, it was announced that LuPone would play Diana Vreeland in a revival of Full Gallop, by Mark Hampton and Mary Louise Wilson, slated to open at NY City Center Stage II in January 2027.

== Solo concerts and tours ==
LuPone performs regularly in her solo shows Matters of the Heart; Coulda, Woulda, Shoulda; and The Lady With the Torch which sold out at Carnegie Hall. For example, she performed her one-woman show The Gypsy In My Soul at the Caramoor Fall Festival, New York, in September 2010. She also appears at venues across North America in concerts with Mandy Patinkin, at such venues as the Mayo Center for the Performing Arts in September 2010.

She appeared as the inaugural act at a new cabaret space, 54 Below, in New York City in June 2012. According to The New York Times reviewer,

Nowadays Ms. LuPone generates more raw excitement than any other performer on the Broadway and cabaret axis, with the possible exception of Liza Minnelli.... And her brilliant show, conceived and directed by her long-time collaborator, Scott Wittman, deserves many lives, perhaps even a Broadway run in an expanded edition. It certifies Ms. LuPone's place in the lineage of quirky international chanteuses like Lotte Lenya, Marlene Dietrich and Edith Piaf, who, like Ms. LuPone, conquered show business with forceful, outsize personalities while playing by their own musical rules.

She also appeared as the inaugural act at the Sharon L. Morse Entertainment Center in The Villages, Florida, on April 30, 2015, to a sold-out audience of residents mainly 55 years-of-age and older.

In 2016, LuPone debuted the solo concert Don't Monkey with Broadway, which she continued to perform through 2023.

In 2023, she premiered Songs from a Hat, an audience-driven concert featuring songs and stories from throughout her career.Following performances across the United States, she took the production on its first international tour with engagements across Spain in 2026.

In 2024, LuPone premiered the autobiographical concert A Life in Notes, which traces her life and career through music and personal anecdotes. The production was subsequently presented across the United States, in London in 2025, and made its Asian debut at the WestK Cabaret Festival in Hong Kong in 2026. Earlier that year, she had revived her solo concert Matters of the Heart to commemorate the 25th anniversary of its original presentation.

== Artistry and reputation ==
LuPone is widely regarded as one of the greatest Broadway performers of her generation and one of the most influential actors in musical theater. The London Times once nicknamed her the "first lady of the theater", and American-British journalist Hadley Freeman declared her "the queen of Broadway" and "the goddess of the modern musical". In 2010, theatre critic Charles McNulty wrote that her stage presence demonstrates a ferocity that, when paired with the right material, resembles "a return to a golden age when powerhouses ruled Broadway". AllMusic biographer William Ruhlmann noted that, unlike her predecessors Mary Martin and Ethel Merman, LuPone was never afforded the luxury to seamlessly transition between musical productions, instead using lulls in her Broadway career to diversify her endeavors by appearing in plays, films, television, nightclubs, concert tours, and recording solo studio albums. According to Susan Vaughn of the Los Angeles Times, LuPone is mostly known for playing "larger-than-life characters" on stage, whereas Adam Sandel of The Advocate observed "she's often played women who've fought like hell to overcome obstacles through the sheer force of indomitable will". She does not have Jewish heritage but has played many Jewish women, both on stage and screen.

LuPone believes she is often cast in ethnic parts because of her Italian heritage and prominent facial features, which allow her to play more interesting female roles. At the same time, she has expressed frustration at frequently being overlooked for roles she believes she is best suited for, often in favor of less qualified actors. She has stated she has been "bullied" by Broadway professionals for much of her career.

Music and theatre critics have described LuPone as a mezzo-soprano, which The Seattle Times said can equally "blast a big showtune out of the park, or sweetly murmur a lullaby". Vocally, she is known for her powerful, emotive style of belting, and according to Nerelle Harper of QNews set a new standard "for a modern generation of high-belt thrill trillers". To cope with some vocally demanding roles such as Evita, during which she lost her voice several times, she remained silent when not performing and limited social activities. After undergoing surgery to treat vocal nodules during the 1990s, she learned how to sing in a more operatic manner to preserve her voice, prior to which she admitted to relying on "sheer guts and willpower" to belt. She credits vocal coach Joan Lader with saving her career and teaching her "a technique to allow me to continue to sing with the strength and the clarity". LuPone has performed some operatic roles, despite having no formal operatic training. She has performed in several Sondheim musicals, and credits the composer with making her a better singer due to the difficulty of his material. In return, Sondheim has praised her singing, acting, and attention to detail, and thanked her for "enhancing my shows — and everyone else's for that matter". According to Andrew Gans of Playbill, LuPone belongs to a handful of singing actors who "are masters of stillness, bringing songs to full life with an inner well of emotions that seep out in unexpected and heartbreaking moments". However, her trademark diction has been criticized for sounding unclear, including by collaborators Andrew Lloyd Webber and John Houseman, the latter of whom reportedly strangled her over her enunciation. LuPone admitted that her emotional acting choices can compromise her diction. In addition to Sondheim, LuPone has identified performers Edith Piaf, Bette Davis, and David Mamet as influences, and expressed admiration for stage actresses Angela Lansbury, Zoe Caldwell, and Elaine Stritch, all of whose signature roles she would eventually play herself.

The media has described LuPone as a polarizing entertainer, equally praised and criticized for her talent and unfiltered opinions. McNulty observed that critics have alternated between pigeonholing her into specific genres or underappreciating her vibrancy. She has been labeled a diva for much of her career, which journalists attribute to both her talent and high standards, and perceived demanding temperament on and off-stage. Ruhlmann said her reported "cold, dark" persona allowed her to excel playing "the kinds of anti-heroines who peopled the musicals of the later decades of the 20th century". LuPone has been described by some as difficult to work with, a reputation she attributes to sexism and the way assertive women are often perceived in the industry. Theatre critic Ben Brantley reported that the fallout from Sunset Boulevard damaged LuPone's public image and relegated her Broadway appearances to one-woman and non-musical shows, until she returned to musical theater in the early 2000s. Meanwhile, her Evita co-star Mandy Patinkin defended her as a sensitive performer who "can't let certain feelings go, which is a burden and a blessing. She fights through it all and gives everything, until there's nothing left in her". Her fanbase has been nicknamed "LuPonistas", and she has often been hired to play exaggerated versions of herself in television and film, representing "the symbol of Broadway musical theater", according to Time Out's Adam Feldman.

LuPone is known for her candid and outspoken nature, a trait she attributes to her upbringing. She has stated that her forthrightness has occasionally led to professional setbacks, beginning with her time promoting Evita. Her unfiltered remarks and actions have often made headlines, including instances of going off-script during performances. A vocal critic of the commercialization of Broadway, LuPone has likened its current state to Las Vegas, arguing that shows should have limited runs to allow space for fresh, innovative productions. She has also expressed a disdain for red carpet events, noting that her tendency to "speak [her] truth" can be at odds with the expected decorum of such occasions. Additionally, LuPone has been outspoken about theater etiquette, frequently voicing concerns over disruptive behavior by some audience members.

In May 2025, LuPone posted her first public apology on Instagram after criticism of comments she had made about Audra McDonald and Kecia Lewis in a New Yorker profile published earlier that week. In the statement she called her own language “demeaning and disrespectful”, said she regretted her “flippant and emotional responses”, and added that she hoped to apologise to both actors personally. The apology followed an open letter signed by more than 500 Broadway professionals that described her remarks as racially disrespectful and urged “accountability, justice and respect”.

In February 2026, LuPone made a speech during her Carnegie Hall concert, where she condemned President Trump's plan to close the Kennedy Center. The speech made national headlines, with LuPone advocating to keep the venue open and calling Trump a 'buffoon.' Adding, 'This, actually, strikes close to home because — art is the soul of the nation. And think about it, when was the last time you heard the words ‘art’ and ‘culture’ in a conversation in this country? And we have to speak up again. We just have to elevate it, and one of the ways we’re going to elevate it is to keep the building standing.'

== Personal life ==
LuPone is married to Matthew Johnston. The couple's wedding ceremony was on the stage of the Vivian Beaumont Theater at Lincoln Center on December 12, 1988 after filming the TV movie LBJ, where Johnston worked as a cameraman. They have one child. They reside in Edisto Beach, South Carolina and Kent, Connecticut. In the 1970s, LuPone dated actor Kevin Kline for seven years after the two met as students at Juilliard.

== Acting credits ==
=== Theatre ===
Sources: Playbill Vault; Internet Broadway Database; Internet Off-Broadway Database

Year	Show	Role	Notes	Ref.
1971	Iphigenia	Unknown	West End – The Young Vic (professional stage debut)	
1972	The School for Scandal	Lady Teazle	Off-Broadway (City Center Acting Company)	
1972	Women Beware Women	Bianca	Off-Broadway (City Center Acting Company)	
1972	The Hostage	Colette / Kathleen	Off-Broadway (City Center Acting Company)	
1972	The Lower Depths	Natasha Karpovna	Off-Broadway (City Center Acting Company)	
1972	Next Time I'll Sing To You	Lizzie	Off-Broadway (City Center Acting Company)	
1973	Three Sisters	Irina Prozorova	Broadway (debut) – Billy Rose Theater	
1973	The Beggar's Opera	Lucy Lockit	Broadway – Billy Rose Theater	
1973	Measure For Measure	Boy and Understudy, Julietta	Broadway – Billy Rose Theater	
1973	Scapin	Hyancinthe	Broadway – Billy Rose Theater	
1974	Next Time I'll Sing To You	Lizzie	Broadway – Billy Rose Theater	
1975	The Robber Bridegroom	Rosamund Musgrove	Broadway – Harkness Theatre	
1975	Edward II	Prince Edward	Broadway – Harkness Theatre	
1975	The Time of Your Life	Kitty Duval	Broadway – Harkness Theatre	
1975	Three Sisters	Irina Prozorova	Broadway – Harkness Theatre	
1976	The Baker's Wife	Genevieve Castagnet	Off-Broadway / Tour	
1977	The Woods	Ruth	Chicago – St. Nicholas Theatre	
1977	The Water Engine	Rita Lang	Off-Broadway – The Public Theater	
1978	The Water Engine	Rita Lang / Lily La Pon	Broadway – Plymouth Theatre	
1978	Working	Nora Watson / Roberta Victor	Broadway – 46th Street Theater	
1978	Catchpenny Twist	Monagh	Connecticut – Hartford Stage	
1979	Evita	Eva Perón	Broadway – Broadway Theatre	
1981	Evita	Eva Perón	Australian tour	
1982	The Woods	Ruth	Off-Broadway – Second Stage Theatre	
1982	Edmond	Mrs. Burke (replacement)	Off-Broadway – Provincetown Playhouse	
1983	As You Like It	Rosalind	Regional – Guthrie Theatre	
1983	America Kicks Up Its Heels	Cleo	Off-Broadway – Playwrights Horizons	
1983	The Cradle Will Rock	Moll / Sister Mister	Off-Broadway – America Place Theater	
1984	Oliver!	Nancy	Broadway – Mark Hellinger Theatre	
1984	Accidental Death of an Anarchist	The Reporter	Broadway – Belasco Theatre	
1985	The Cradle Will Rock	Moll	West End – The Old Vic	
1985	Les Misérables	Fantine	West End – Barbican Centre	
1987	Anything Goes	Reno Sweeney	Broadway – Vivian Beaumont Theater	
1993	Sunset Boulevard	Norma Desmond	West End – Adelphi Theatre	
1995	Patti LuPone on Broadway	Herself	Concert – Walter Kerr Theatre	
1995	Pal Joey	Vera Simpson	Concert – Encores!	
1996	Master Class	Maria Callas (replacement)	Broadway – John Golden Theater	
1997	Master Class	Maria Callas (replacement)	West End – Queen's Theatre	
1997	The Old Neighborhood	Jolly	Broadway – Booth Theatre	
1998	Annie Get Your Gun	Annie Oakley	Concert – Lincoln Center Theater	
2000	Matters of the Heart	Herself	Broadway – Vivian Beaumont Theater	
2000	Sweeney Todd	Mrs. Nellie Lovett	Concert – New York Philharmonic	
2001	Sweeney Todd	Mrs. Nellie Lovett	Concert – San Francisco Symphony	
2001	Sweeney Todd	Mrs. Nellie Lovett	Illinois – Ravinia Festival	
2001	Noises Off	Dotty Ottley	Broadway – Brooks Atkinson Theater	
2002	Anything Goes	Reno Sweeney	Concert – Lincoln Center	
2002	A Little Night Music	Desiree Armfeldt	Illinois – Ravinia Festival	
2003	Passion	Fosca	Illinois – Ravinia Festival	
2004	Can-Can	La Mome Pistache	Concert – Encores!	
2004	Candide	The Old Lady	Concert – New York Philharmonic	
2004	Sunday in the Park with George	Yvonne / Blair Daniels	Illinois – Ravinia Festival	
2005	Regina	Regina Giddens	Washington, D.C. – Kennedy Center	
2005	Passion	Fosca	Off-Broadway – Lincoln Center Theater	
2005	Children And Art	Performer	Concert – New Amsterdam Theatre	
2005	Anyone Can Whistle	Cora Hoover Hooper	Illinois – Ravinia Festival	
2005	Sweeney Todd	Mrs. Nellie Lovett	Broadway – Eugene O'Neill Theatre	
2006	Gypsy	Rose Hovick	Illinois- Ravinia Festival	
2006	To Hell and Back	Anne	California – First United Methodist Church	
2007	Rise and Fall of the City of Mahagonny	Leokadja Begbick	Los Angeles Opera	
2007	Gypsy	Rose Hovick	City Center Encores!	
2008	Gypsy	Rose Hovick	Broadway – St. James Theatre	
2010	Annie Get Your Gun	Annie Oakley	Illinois- Ravinia Festival	
2010	Women on the Verge of a Nervous Breakdown	Lucia	Broadway – Belasco Theater	
2011	An Evening with Patti LuPone and Mandy Patinkin	Herself	Concert – Ethel Barrymore Theatre	
2011	Company	Joanne	Concert – New York Philharmonic	
2011	The Seven Deadly Sins	Anna I (Singer)	New York City Ballet	
2012	The Anarchist	Cathy	Broadway – John Golden Theatre	
2015	The Ghosts of Versailles	Samira	Los Angeles Opera	
2015	Shows For Days	Irene	Off-Broadway – Newhouse Theater	
2016	War Paint	Helena Rubinstein	Chicago – Goodman Theatre	
2017	War Paint	Helena Rubinstein	Broadway – Nederlander Theater	
2018	Company	Joanne	West End Revival – Gielgud Theatre	
2020	Company	Joanne	Broadway – Bernard B. Jacobs Theatre (Pre-Covid and Post-Covid)	
2021–22	Company	Joanne	Broadway – Bernard B. Jacobs Theatre (Pre-Covid and Post-Covid)	
2023	Gutenberg! The Musical!	The Producer (one night only)	Broadway – James Earl Jones Theater	
2024	The Roommate	Robyn	Broadway – Booth Theatre	
2026	Titanique	Herself (one night only)	Broadway – St. James Theatre	
2026	Candide	The Old Lady	Los Angeles Opera	

=== Film ===
Sources: TCM; AllMovie

Year	Title	Role	Notes	Ref.
1978	King of the Gypsies	Unknown	Uncredited	
1979	1941	Lydia Hedberg		
1982	Fighting Back	Lisa D'Angelo		
1985	Witness	Elaine Book		
1985	Cat's Eye	Girl's Mother	Deleted Prologue	
1986	Wise Guys	Wanda Valentini		
1989	Driving Miss Daisy	Florine Werthan		
1993	Family Prayers	Aunt Nan		
1995	The Song Spinner	Zantalalia		
1999	The 24 Hour Woman	Joan Marshall		
1999	Summer of Sam	Helen		
2000	State and Main	Sherry Bailey		
2001	Heist	Betty Croft		
2002	City by the Sea	Maggie LaMarca		
2011	Company	Joanne	Filmed production	
2011	Union Square	Lucia		
2013	Parker	Ascension Cienfuegos		
2016	The Comedian	Flo Berkowitz		
2019	Cliffs of Freedom	Yia-Yia		
2019	Steven Universe: The Movie	Yellow Diamond	Voice	
2019	Last Christmas	Joyce		
2022	The School for Good and Evil	Mrs. Deauville		
2023	Beau Is Afraid	Mona Wassermann		

=== Television ===
Sources: TCM; AllMovie

Year	Title	Role	Notes	Ref.
1976	The Time of Your Life	Kitty Duval	Television film	
1977	The Andros Targets	Sharon Walker	2 episodes	
1984	Piaf	Narrator	Voice; Television film	
1984	Love Cycle: A Soap Operetta	Rachel Burston	Television film	
1987	LBJ: The Early Years	Lady Bird Johnson	Television film	
1987	Un Siciliano in Sicilia	Vincenzina	3 episodes	
1987	Cowboy Joe	Linda Tidmunk	Television film	
1989–93	Life Goes On	Elizabeth "Libby" Thatcher	83 episodes	
1992	The Water Engine	Rita Lang	Television film	
1993	Frasier	Pam (voice)	Episode: "Dinner at Eight"	
1995	The Song Spinner	Zantalalia	Television film	
1996	Remember WENN	Grace Cavendish	Episode: "There But for the Grace"	
1996	Her Last Chance	Joanna Saxen	Television film	
1996–97	Law & Order	Defense Attorney Ruth Miller	2 episodes	
1998	Frasier	Aunt Zora Crane	Episode: "Beware of Greeks"	
1998	Saturday Night Live	Herself	Episode: "Kelsey Grammer/Sheryl Crow"	
1999	Bonanno: A Godfather's Story	C. Canzinarra	Television film	
1999	Encore! Encore!	Wine Critic	Episode: "A Review to Remember"	
2000	Falcone	Francesca Gold	9 episodes	
2001	Touched by an Angel	Alice Dupree	Episode: "Thief of Hearts"	
2002	Monday Night Mayhem	Emmy Cosell	Television film	
2003	In-Laws	Rochelle Landis	Episode: "Mother's Nature"	
2003	Oz	Stella Coffa	7 episodes	
2005	Live from Lincoln Center	Fosca	Episode: "Passion"	
2005	Will & Grace	Herself	Episode: "Bully Woolley"	
2007	Ugly Betty	Mrs. Weiner	Episode: "Don't Ask, Don't Tell"	
2009–12	30 Rock	Sylvia Rossitano	3 episodes	
2011	Glee	Herself	Episode: "New York"	
2012	Army Wives	Ms. Galassini	Episode: "Battle Scars"	
2013–14	American Horror Story: Coven	Joan Ramsey	4 episodes	
2014	Girls	Herself	2 episodes	
2015	Law & Order: Special Victims Unit	Lydia Lebasi	Episode: "Agent Provocateur"	
2015–16	Penny Dreadful	Joan Clayton	Episode: "The Nightcomers"	
2015–16	Penny Dreadful	Dr. Florence Seward	Main role (Season 3)	
2016–19	Steven Universe	Yellow Diamond	Voice; 8 episodes	
2017	Crazy Ex-Girlfriend	Rabbi Shari	Episode: "Will Scarsdale Like Josh's Shayna Punim?"	
2017	BoJack Horseman	Mimi Stilton	Voice; Episode: "The Judge"	
2017–21	Vampirina	Nanpire	Voice; 19 episodes	
2018	Mom	Rita	Episode: "Taco Bowl and a Tubby Seamstress"	
2019	The Simpsons	Cheryl Monroe	Voice; Episode: "The Girl on the Bus"	
2019	Pose	Ms. Frederica Norman	5 episodes	
2019	Steven Universe: The Movie	Yellow Diamond	Voice; Television film	
2020	Steven Universe Future	Yellow Diamond	Voice; 2 episodes	
2020	Hollywood	Avis Amberg	7 episodes	
2020	Penny Dreadful: City of Angels	Vocalist	Episode: "Hide and Seek"	
2021	Central Park	Roberta McCullough	Voice; Episode: "Down to the Underwire"	
2021	The Great North	Momma Marita	Voice; Episode: "Tasteful Noods Adventure"	
2021	F Is for Family	Nora Murphy	Voice; 3 episodes	
2022	American Horror Story: NYC	Kathy Pizazz	5 episodes	
2024	Agatha All Along	Lilia Calderu	Main role; also contributed to soundtrack	
2024	Marvel Studios: Assembled	Herself	Episode: "The Making of Agatha All Along"	
2025	And Just Like That...	Dottoressa Gianna "Gia" Amato	3 episodes	
2025	The Artist	Rosie Morsch	Episode: "Chapter Six: The Rebirth"	
2025–26	Palm Royale	Marjorie Merriweather Post	3 episodes	
2026	Kevin	Patti LuPony	Voice; 3 episodes	
2026	Elsbeth	Ruby Lane	Episode: "That's All"	

== Discography ==
Selected recordings include:

- The Baker's Wife (Original cast recording)
- Evita (Original Broadway cast recording)
- The Cradle Will Rock (The Acting Company recording)
- Les Misérables (Original London Cast recording)
- Anything Goes (New Broadway Cast Recording)
- Patti LuPone Live (Live Solo Album)
- Heat Wave (John Mauceri conducting the Hollywood Bowl Orchestra)
- Sunset Boulevard (World Premiere/Original London Cast Recording)
- Matters of the Heart (Solo Album)
- Sweeney Todd (New York Philharmonic recording)
- Sweeney Todd (2005 Broadway Cast recording)
- The Lady with the Torch (Solo Album)
- The Lady with the Torch...Still Burning (Solo Album)
- To Hell and Back (Philharmonia Baroque Orchestra World Premier recording)
- Gypsy (2008 Broadway Revival Cast Recording)
- Patti LuPone at Les Mouches (Live Solo Recording of 1980 club act)
- Women on the Verge of a Nervous Breakdown (Original Broadway Cast Recording)
- Far Away Places (Live Solo Album)
- Company (New York Philharmonic recording)
- War Paint (Original Broadway cast recording)
- Don't Monkey with Broadway (Live Solo Album)
- Company (Revival London cast recording)
- A Life In Notes (Live Solo Album 2024)

Her live performance of "Don't Cry for Me Argentina" at the Grammy Awards was released on the 1994 album Grammy's Greatest Moments Volume IV.

In 2009, LuPone's 1985 recording of "I Dreamed a Dream" reached No. 45 on the UK Singles Chart It also reached the Billboard magazine Hot Digital Songs and Hot Singles Recurrents charts in the US.

LuPone recorded a duet with Seth MacFarlane (who was in character as Glenn Quagmire) on the 2005 album Family Guy: Live In Vegas.

A live concert special film, An Evening with Patti LuPone, was filmed in July 2012 and released in November 2012 on SethTv.com with 104 minutes of Patti LuPone songs and stories with host Seth Rudetsky.

A new CD of one of her shows, The Lady with the Torch, was released in 2006 on Sh-K-Boom Records. In December she released bonus tracks for that CD only available on iTunes and the Sh-K-Boom website.

LuPone featured in the Why Am I So Single? Original London cast recording for an extended version of ‘Men R Trash’, which is exclusive to the cast recording.

== See also ==
- List of Italian-American actors
