= List of awards and nominations received by Patti LuPone =

Patti LuPone awards and nominations
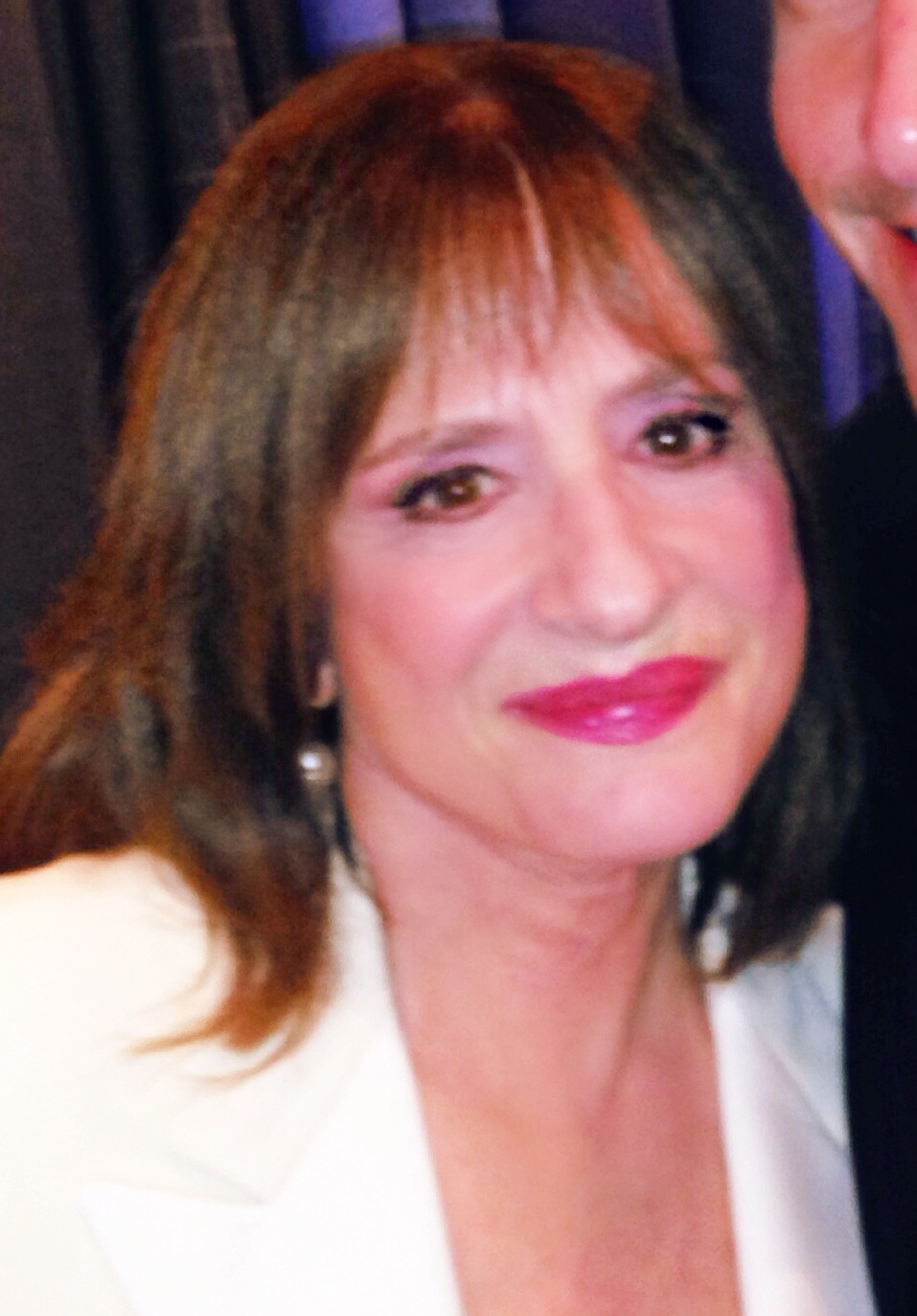
- LuPone in 2014
Awards and nominations
Award	Wins	Nominations
Tony Awards	3	8
Emmy Awards	0	2
Grammy Awards	2	2
Laurence Olivier Awards	2	3

Totals (Note: Certain award groups do not simply award one winner. They acknowledge several different recipients, have runners-up, and have third place. Since this is a specific recognition and is different from losing an award, runner-up mentions are considered wins in this award tally. For simplification and to avoid errors, each award in this list has been presumed to have had a prior nomination.)
- Wins: 17
- Nominations: 33

Patti LuPone is an American actress and singer best known for her work in stage musicals and her appearances in film and television. She has won two Grammy Awards, three Tony Awards, and two Olivier Awards as well as nominations for two Emmy Awards.

LuPone has received eight Tony Award nominations for her work on the Broadway stage winning twice for Tony Award for Best Actress in a Musical for her roles in Evita in 1980, and for Gypsy in 2008. She also won the Tony Award for Best Featured Actress in a Musical for Company in 2022. She has received two Grammy Awards in 2008 for Best Classical Album and Best Opera Recording for Welli: Rise and Fall of the City of Mahagonny. For her work on the London stage she won two Laurence Olivier Awards for Best Actress in a Musical for Les Misérables / Cradle Will Rock in 1985 and Best Actress in a Supporting Role in a Musical for Company in 2019.

She also received nine Drama Desk Award nominations, winning four times for Evita, Anything Goes, Gypsy, and Company, and six Outer Critics Circle Award nominations, winning three times for Patti LuPone on Broadway, Gypsy, and Company. For her work on television she received a Primetime Emmy Award nomination for Outstanding Guest Actress in a Comedy Series for her performance in Frasier. She also received a Daytime Emmy Award nomination for Outstanding Performer in Children's Programming for Song Spinner.

== Major associations ==
=== Tony Awards ===
Year	Category	Nominated work	Result	Ref.
1976	Best Featured Actress in a Musical	The Robber Bridegroom	Nominated	
1980	Best Actress in a Musical	Evita	Won	
1988	Best Actress in a Musical	Anything Goes	Nominated	
2006	Best Actress in a Musical	Sweeney Todd: The Demon Barber of Fleet Street	Nominated	
2008	Best Actress in a Musical	Gypsy	Won	
2011	Best Featured Actress in a Musical	Women on the Verge of a Nervous Breakdown	Nominated	
2017	Best Actress in a Musical	War Paint	Nominated	
2022	Best Featured Actress in a Musical	Company	Won	

=== Laurence Olivier Awards ===
Year	Category	Nominated work	Result	Ref.
1985	Best Actress in a Musical	Les Misérables / The Cradle Will Rock	Won	
1993	Best Actress in a Musical	Sunset Boulevard	Nominated	
2019	Best Actress in a Supporting Role in a Musical	Company	Won	

=== Grammy Awards ===
Year	Category	Nominated work	Result	Ref.
2009	Best Classical Album	Weill: Rise and Fall of the City of Mahagonny	Won	
2009	Best Opera Recording	Weill: Rise and Fall of the City of Mahagonny	Won	

=== Emmy Awards ===
Year	Category	Nominated work	Result	Ref.
Daytime Emmy Award
1996	Outstanding Performer in Children's Programming	Song Spinner	Nominated	
Primetime Emmy Award
1998	Outstanding Guest Actress in a Comedy Series	Frasier	Nominated	

== Theatre awards ==
=== Drama Desk Awards ===
Year	Category	Nominated work	Result	Ref.
1976	Outstanding Actress in a Musical	The Robber Bridegroom	Nominated	
1980	Outstanding Actress in a Musical	Evita	Won	
1988	Outstanding Actress in a Musical	Anything Goes	Won	
1998	Outstanding Featured Actress in a Play	The Old Neighborhood	Nominated	
2006	Outstanding Actress in a Musical	Sweeney Todd: The Demon Barber of Fleet Street	Nominated	
2008	Outstanding Actress in a Musical	Gypsy	Won	
2011	Outstanding Featured Actress in a Musical	Women on the Verge of a Nervous Breakdown	Nominated	
2017	Outstanding Actress in a Musical	War Paint	Nominated	
2022	Outstanding Featured Actress in a Musical	Company	Won	

=== Outer Critics Circle Award ===
Year	Category	Nominated work	Result	Ref.
1995	Best Solo Performance	Patti LuPone on Broadway	Won	
2006	Outstanding Actress in a Musical	Sweeney Todd: The Demon Barber of Fleet Street	Nominated	
2008	Outstanding Actress in a Musical	Gypsy	Won	
2011	Outstanding Featured Actress in a Musical	Women on the Verge of a Nervous Breakdown	Nominated	
2017	Outstanding Actress in a Musical	War Paint	Nominated	
2022	Outstanding Featured Actress in a Musical	Company	Won	

=== Miscellaneous awards ===
Year	Association	Category	Nominated work	Result
2008	Drama League Award	Distinguished Performance	Gypsy	Won
2011	United Solo Theatre Festival	uAward	The Gypsy in My Soul	Won
2016	Critics' Choice Television Award	Best Guest Performer in a Drama Series	Penny Dreadful	Nominated
2019	WhatsOnStage Awards	Best Supporting Actress in a Musical	Company	Won
2025	Critics' Choice Television Award	Best Supporting Actress in a Comedy Series	Agatha All Along	Nominated
2025	Independent Spirit Awards	Best Supporting Performance in a New Scripted Series	Agatha All Along	Nominated
