= The Song Spinner =

- Original VHS cassette cover
- Directed by: Randy Bradshaw
- Written by: Pauline Le Bel
- Produced by: Kevin Tierney
- Starring: Patti LuPone; John Neville; Meredith Henderson; David Hemblen; Julian Richings; Lorne Cossette; Matthew Lerigny
- Cinematography: François Protat
- Music by: Lawrence Shragge
- Distributed by: Distribution La Fête
- Release date: 1995
- Country: Canada
- Language: English

The Song Spinner is a 1995 Canadian fantasy film (based on the original novel of the same title by Pauline Le Bel), following the story of a kingdom where all forms of noise and music have been outlawed by a fascist Captain. When a beautiful and mysterious woman arrives in the kingdom, she bestows a "song spinner" (musical instrument) upon Aurora, a curious and spirited little girl. The film was shot primarily onsite at the Fortress of Louisbourg on Cape Breton Island, Nova Scotia. The Song Spinner stars Meredith Henderson as Aurora, with supporting actors including Patti LuPone, John Neville, David Hemblen, Julian Richings, Lorne Cossette and Matthew Lerigny, among others. For unknown reasons, the film was never commercially released (except for a brief VHS release), and no digital copy publicly exists, although Le Bel's original novel remains available in print.

== Plot ==
Aurora, a little girl, lives in Shandrilan, an authoritarian kingdom where the tyrannical Captain Nizzle and King Frilo, The Magnificent, have banned all loud noises and music, arresting anybody who fails to abide by these rules. The rules are (somewhat arbitrarily) enforced by Noise Police Constables Callo and Larch, neither of whom actually dislike music themselves. Aurora's parents warn her not to get too curious about why music and noise are banned, while her Grandfather Jessup tells her of a mysterious device called a "song spinner" that can generate widescale amounts of music, but was confiscated by Nizzle and Frilo years ago. The arrival of an enigmatic lady named Zantalalia catches Aurora's attention; Zantalalia is kindly and shares a song spinner with the young girl, who hides it with the help of her little brother, Tibo. When Zantalalia is arrested, Aurora and Tibo use an upcoming town meeting as an opportunity to help. They use the delightful music of the song spinner to distract Larch and Callo, who both are so nostalgic for the music that they begin crying. After freeing Zantalalia, they confront Frilo, who admits that he banned music and noise out of grief for missing Zantalalia when she left Shandrilan after being exiled. Captain Nizzle orders Frilo to keep the kingdom's authoritarian structure in place, but Larch and Callo, now dissidents of the old order, promptly arrest the Captain. The kingdom rejoices with a celebration of music and song as Zantalalia sings.

== Cast ==
- Patti LuPone as Zantalalia
- John Neville as Frilo the Magnificent
- Meredith Henderson as Aurora
- David Hemblen as Captain Nizzle
- Brent Carver as Selmo
- Wendel Meldrum as Mona
- Matthew Lerigny as Tibo
- Leslie Carlson as Lorie
- Paul Coeur as Constable Larch
- Julian Richings as Constable Callo
- Lorne Cossette as Gody
- Ross Campbell as Grandfather Jessup

== Reception ==
The Song Spinner received positive reviews from critics. Charles Cassady of Cliff47 stated, "beautifully filmed in Nova Scotia, The Song Spinner is that rare thing, an all-new fairy tale for all ages that doesn't spoof itself silly, but rather delivers its timeless allegory with grace, understated urgency, and a visual testure reminiscent of a Brueghel painting come to life." Tony Scott of Variety was less impressed by the film, but gave a positive overall conclusion, stating, "Le Bel is saying something worthwhile to kids about tolerance and tyranny; it just takes too much time and patience. It’s not easy to figure out which age bracket the producers have in mind for their audience, but the program has a haunting quality, a Middle European feel, that spells fairy tale despite the curious explanation, at long last, for Zantalalia’s exile. Aurora’s parents, played by Wendel Meldrum and Brent Carver, are particularly effective; David Hemblen, as Frilo’s vicious military aide, chews up the scenery, as he should in such a meller. Matthew Lerigny, as Tibo, Aurora’s wee brother, is charming. John Blackie’s design for the telefilm is imaginative and darkly threatening, and cameraman François Protat strikes an overall menacing tone. Wendy Partridge’s rich costuming helps create even more of a foreign atmosphere, and Lawrence Shragge’s helpful score is persuasive." The film received Emmy nominations for Best Children's Special, and Best Actress, Patti Lupone. Pauline Le Bel also received an Emmy nomination, and a Cable ACE Award for Best Writing in a Children's Special. The Song Spinner was called "an enchanting fable – great family entertainment" by Mick Martin & Marsha Porter’s Video Movie Guide.

== Distribution ==
The Song Spinner had a moderate Hallmark video release on VHS cassette in the 1990s, and was broadcast in the United States on Showtime as their Christmas Eve Special (1996), while airing several times on CBC-TV in Canada. The film never had a DVD or video streaming release, and is considered a rare film, although the VHS cassette appears for sale as a second-hand vintage item from time to time on eCommerce websites such as Amazon and Etsy.

== Original novel ==
Pauline Le Bel based the film The Song Spinner on her book of the same title. The book, a paperback published under the imprint Northern Lights Books for Children, fell out of print in the 1990s and was re-released in 2002 as a print paperback by Red Deer Press.
