= Chivalry (TV series) =

British comedy-drama TV series

- Genre: Comedy; Sex comedy Black comedy Drama
- Created by: Steve Coogan; Sarah Solemani
- Written by: Steve Coogan; Sarah Solemani
- Directed by: Marta Cunningham
- Starring: Steve Coogan; Sarah Solemani; Sienna Miller; Wanda Sykes; Adjani Salmon
- Country of origin: United Kingdom
- Original language: English
- No. of series: 1
- No. of episodes: 6

Production
- Executive producers: Sarah Solemani; Steve Coogan; Sarah Monteith; Rupert Majendie; Marta Cunningham
- Producer: Isabel Richardson
- Cinematography: Andy Strahorn
- Production companies: Baby Cow Productions; Jax Media

Original release
- Network: Channel 4
- Release: 21 April – 19 May 2022

Chivalry is a 2022 British comedy-drama television series broadcast on Channel 4. It was written by and stars Steve Coogan and Sarah Solemani.

== Cast ==
- Steve Coogan as Cameron
- Sarah Solemani as Bobby
- Sienna Miller as Lark
- Wanda Sykes as Jean Shrill
- Lolly Adefope as Ama
- Aisling Bea as Tatiana
- Adjani Salmon as Aston

== Episodes ==
All episodes were made available on All4 following the first episode's premiere on 21 April 2022. Episodes were made available in America on the streaming service The Network.

| No. | Title | Directed by | Written by | Channel 4 airdate | UK viewers (millions) (Note: 7-day consolidated, excludes device viewership and viewership prior to linear broadcast.) |
|---|---|---|---|---|---|
| 1 | "Episode 1" | Marta Cunningham | Steve Coogan & Sarah Solemani | 21 April 2022 | 0.71 |
| 2 | "Episode 2" | Marta Cunningham | Steve Coogan & Sarah Solemani | 21 April 2022 | 0.50 |
| 3 | "Episode 3" | Marta Cunningham | Steve Coogan & Sarah Solemani | 28 April 2022 | 0.42 |
| 4 | "Episode 4" | Marta Cunningham | Steve Coogan & Sarah Solemani | 5 May 2022 | <0.37 |
| 5 | "Episode 5" | Marta Cunningham | Steve Coogan & Sarah Solemani | 12 May 2022 | <0.35 |
| 6 | "Episode 6" | Marta Cunningham | Steve Coogan & Sarah Solemani | 19 May 2022 | <0.34 |

== Production ==
On 13 January 2020, it was announced that Steve Coogan and Sarah Solemani were writing a six episode comedy-drama series about the "sexual politics in the wake of the #MeToo movement" for Channel 4. The series is executive produced by Christine Langan from Coogan's Baby Cow Productions.
