= The Anarchist (play) =

Play written by David Mamet

- Original language: English
- Written by: David Mamet
- Genre: Drama
- Setting: Prison parole review office

Premiere
- Date: 2012
- Place: Broadway

The Anarchist is a two-person play by David Mamet that opened on Broadway in 2012, starring Patti LuPone and Debra Winger. The play shows an interrogation between a female prison parole review officer and a female former domestic terrorist. The title character, though fictional, is based on two female members of the 1970s American militant organization Weather Underground, Judith Alice Clark and Kathy Boudin, who both took part in the fatal 1981 Brink's robbery.

== Plot ==
The play is set in the office of a prison parole review officer who is seen questioning and conducting an extended interview with a long-term prisoner incarcerated for a Weather Underground-type crime during which she killed two police officers. The outcome denies the long-term prisoner access to parole based on the harsh nature of the crime and the lack of remorse shown for her crimes.

== Reception ==
The New York production of the play was not well-received by critics. Writing in his New York Times review of 2 December 2012, Ben Brantley wrote: "Mr. Mamet has always been preoccupied with words both as power tools and as camouflage. That’s true whether the language is lowdown (as in 'Glengarry' and 'American Buffalo') or high-flown (as in 'Oleanna'). This has often involved a certain verbal self-consciousness among his characters. But it has never been as acute as in 'The Anarchist,' in which both women are especially aware of words as instruments of misdirection and what Cathy calls the opacity of human motives. Theatergoers must really furrow their brows here just to follow the basic arguments, never mind the layers of motivation woven into them. And without giving away too much, I think it’s fair to reveal 'Anarchist' basically concludes that all those polysyllabic words mean nothing, when you come right down to it. Right is right, and wrong is wrong. When you reach the end of 'Anarchist,' you may feel you’ve traveled an unnecessarily winding road to get there."

Having officially opened on Sunday 2 December 2012, producers posted closing notices the following Wednesday and cut the run short on 16 December, after only 23 previews and 17 performances.

The play opened in Madrid at the same time to positive reviews. La anarquista was directed by José Pascual with Magüi Mira as Cathy (the anarchist) and Ana Wagener as Ann (the prison officer). The play had a 2015 production in Los Angeles, directed by Marja-Lewis Ryan with Felicity Huffman and Rebecca Pidgeon. The play had its Ohio premiere on July 1 and 2, 2017, at the Van Fleet Theatre in Columbus. It was produced by Stage Right Theatrics, the country's only conservative theatre organization, and was chosen because of Mamet's much publicized conversion to conservatism in 2008.

In a 2017 article for The Times Literary Supplement, Jaki Mccarrick said of November, Race, and The Anarchist that "these are state-of-the-nation plays. Each of them is outstanding, and bears Mamet’s trademarks – rhythmic and witty dialogue, erudition, flawless musicality – while being similar in construction and in how their big ideas are explored. They are also sufficiently different to be treated as stand-alone pieces, (though I would be glad to see them performed together)."
