= William C. Rhoden =

American sports journalist (born 1950)

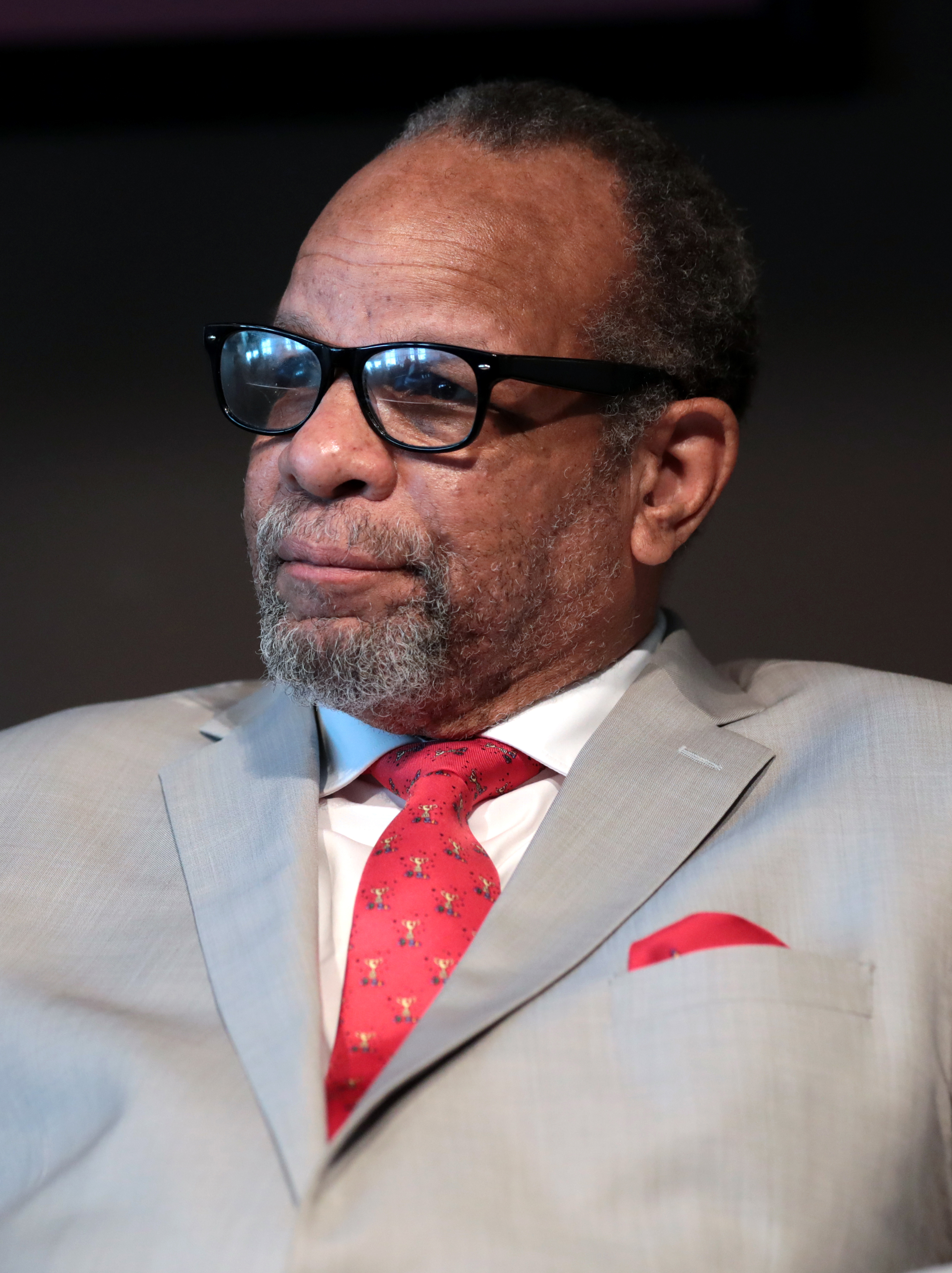
- Rhoden in 2022
- Born: 1950 (age 75–76); Chicago, Illinois, U.S.
- Education: Morgan State University
- Occupations: Sports journalist, Author
- Years active: 1973–present

William C. Rhoden (born 1950) is an American sports journalist and author who formerly worked as a columnist for The New York Times from 1983 until 2016, when he joined ESPN's The Undefeated as a writer-at-large, where he is currently employed. Rhoden is also a visiting senior practitioner at Arizona State University as well as the director of the Rhoden Fellows program.

== Background ==
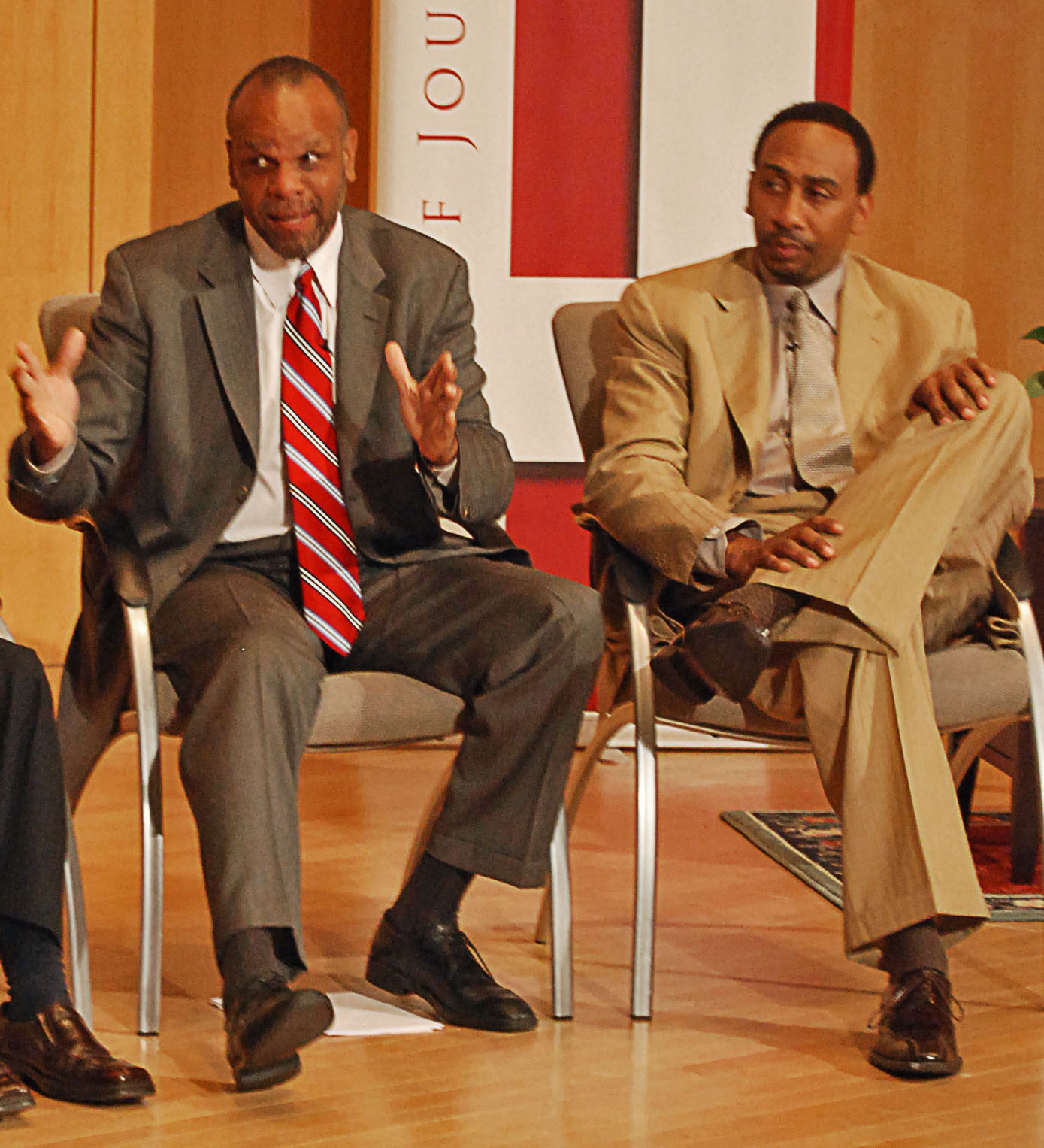
Rhoden with sports analyst Stephen A. Smith

Rhoden was born in 1950 in Chicago, Illinois. He attended Morgan State University from 1968 to 1973, and played on the 1968 Morgan State Bears football team that beat the Grambling Tigers in Yankee Stadium, the annual match known as the "Whitney Young Classic".

== Career ==
After graduating from college, he worked for the Afro-American Times, the Baltimore Sun, and eventually Ebony where he became a columnist for magazine from 1974 to 1978. In 1983, Rhoden joined the New York Times staff as a sports columnist.

In 2006, he published his first book, the Forty Million Dollar Slaves: The Rise, Fall, and Redemption of the Black Athlete, an original and perceptive analysis of the racist history and current reality of professional sports in the United States. Etan Thomas, a major activist and retired professional basketball player, praises this book and claims it is a "necessary read for all young athletes."
