= The Artist (TV series) =

American television series

- Genre: Murder mystery
- Created by: Aram Rappaport
- Screenplay by: Aram Rappaport
- Directed by: Aram Rappaport
- Starring: Mandy Patinkin; Janet McTeer; Danny Huston; Patti LuPone; Hank Azaria; Zachary Quinto; Clark Gregg; Katharine McPhee; Jill Hennessy; Ever Anderson; Ana Mulvoy Ten
- Country of origin: United States
- Original language: English
- No. of series: 1
- No. of episodes: 6

Production
- Executive producer: Aram Rappaport
- Producer: Hilary Shor
- Cinematography: Luca Fantini

Original release
- Network: The Network
- Release: November 27, 2025 – present

The Artist is an American murder mystery television series set during the Gilded Age starring an ensemble cast including Mandy Patinkin, Janet McTeer, Danny Huston, Patti LuPone, Hank Azaria, and Zachary Quinto. It premiered on The Network on November 27, 2025.

== Premise ==
A murder mystery set in the Gilded Age has an ensemble of the era's celebrities including Thomas Edison, Edgar Degas and Evelyn Nesbit at the home of an eccentric tycoon who promptly dies.

== Cast ==
- Mandy Patinkin as Norman Henry
- Janet McTeer as Marian Henry
- Danny Huston as Edgar Dégas
- Patti LuPone as Rosie Morsch
- Hank Azaria as Thomas Edison
- Zachary Quinto as Delphin Delmas
- Clark Gregg as Harry Kendall Thaw
- Katharine McPhee as Nora Bayes
- Jill Hennessy as Nesbit Mother
- Ever Anderson as Evelyn Nesbit
- Ana Mulvoy Ten as Lilith
- Katherine O'Sullivan as Gretchen
- Anni Krueger as Ida
- Elizabeth Lande as Laura Rockefeller
- David Pittu as Marius
- Aramis Merlin as Gunter
- Gemma McIlhenny as Celia
- Karen Woditsch as Eliza
- Regina Ohashi as Beatrice

== Production ==
Aram Rappaport serves as creator, executive producer, writer, and director. Hilary Shor is a producer on the series.

The cast includes Mandy Patinkin, Janet McTeer, Danny Huston, Patti LuPone, Hank Azaria, Zachary Quinto and Clark Gregg, as well as Katharine McPhee, Jill Hennessy, Ever Anderson, and Ana Mulvoy Ten.

Filming took place in late 2024 in Connecticut. The Hill–Stead Museum was used as the setting for the mansion of the main character.

== Broadcast ==
The Artist debuted in two parts on The Network. The first three episodes were released on November 27, 2025, and the last three episodes were released on December 25. Fifth Season purchased worldwide rights that month.
