= The Network (streaming service) =

Streaming service

- Company type: OTT media service
- Website type: Streaming media
- Available in: English
- Founded: March 19, 2024; 2 years ago
- Area served: United States
- Owner: Berkshire Hathaway
- Founder: Aram Rappaport
- Key people: Aram Rappaport
- Industry: Television
- Parent: Berkshire Hathaway
- Website: thenetwork.stream
- Advertising: Yes
- Registration: Required
- Launched: May 1, 2024; 2 years ago
- Current status: Active

The Network is a free, ad-supported streaming platform and production studio that launched in the US on April 30, 2024 supported by BH Media Holdings. Founded by Aram Rappaport, The Network releases a small slate of exclusive, prestige original films and series rather than a large licensed library, positioning itself against scrolling fatigue. Most content is available free with advertising and without a credit card; a premium tier priced at $4.99 per month removes advertising across nearly all content. As of 2026, The Network has stated that each new user costs $2 to acquire and generates $13 in revenue for the platform. The Network releases new original titles every month.

== History ==
The Network was founded by Aram Rappaport, a writer-director who previously founded advertising agency The Boathouse in 2013. Rappaport launched the service as a strategic response to conditions in the entertainment industry. He framed the platform around delivering a small number of premium titles directly to audiences - rather than maintaining a large, unruly library - and a production model that applied an independent-film cost structure to serialized television to produce star-driven series at lower cost.

The Network debuted on April 30, 2024 with two titles: Chivalry, a British comedy series created by and starring Steve Coogan and Sarah Solemani, and The Green Veil starring John Leguizamo and written and directed by Aram Rappaport. The historical fiction series follows Leguizamo as Gordon Rogers, a United States government agent and Latin immigrant obsessed with the American Dream. The series was inspired by the government programs designed to remove Native American children from their communities and place them in white families. The Green Veil was renewed for a second season in June 2024.

In September 2024, The Network added Kingdom of Dreams as its third original, a four-part British documentary series about the high-fashion industry. Around the same period, The Network partnered with Comcast to offer The Green Veil ad-free exclusively for Comcast customers for National Hispanic Heritage Month.

In 2025, the service expanded its slate of original programming. It premiered The Jewish Council on June 22, 2025, a Dutch WWII period drama, and on July 4, 2025 premiered War Game, a documentary film directed by Jesse Moss and Tony Gerber that captured a real-life simulation of a Situation Room response to a January 6-style domestic insurrection.

In November 2025, The Network premiered The Artist, a Gilded Age murder mystery series starring Janet McTeer, Mandy Patinkin, Danny Huston, Hank Azaria, Patti LuPone, Clark Gregg, Zachary Quinto, Katharine McPhee and Ever Anderson. The series featured Thomas Edison, Edgar Degas, Evelyn Nesbit and many more real-life Gilded Age characters, and was included in Variety and IndieWire's 2026 Emmy Prediction list for Outstanding Limited or Anthology Series.

In May 2026, The Network premiered their latest original The Doll Factory, a series adaptation of The New York Times Editor's Choice and international best-selling novel by Elizabeth Macneal.

== Programming ==
The Network's programming consists of exclusive originals, some produced in-house and others acquired for exclusive U.S. release. Notable titles include:

- The Green Veil (2024), a drama series created, written, and directed by Aram Rappaport, starring John Leguizamo as Gordon Rogers, a government agent in 1950s America; the service's first in-house produced Original, for which a second season was ordered. Variety shortlisted The Green Veil for multiple Emmys including Outstanding Drama Series.
- Chivalry (2024, U.S.), a comedy series by Steve Coogan and Sarah Solemani, originally commissioned by Channel 4 in the UK.
- Kingdom of Dreams (2024, U.S.), a four-part documentary series that chronicles the rise of Tom Ford, Marc Jacobs, Alexander McQueen, and John Galliano during the 1990s.
- The Artist (2025), a six-part Gilded Age murder-mystery series created by Rappaport, with an ensemble cast led by Janet McTeer and Mandy Patinkin. Filmed at the Hill-Stead Muesum in Connecticut, amid real Impression masterpieces by Degas, Manet, Monet and more.
- War Game (2025), a New York Times Critic's Pick documentary about a bipartisan role-play exercise simulating a contested-election crisis.
- The Jewish Council (2025), a Dutch drama series based on the true story of David Cohen (Pierre Bokma), co-president of Amsterdam's wartime Jewish Council. The series was directed by Oscar-nominated directer Paula Van Der Oest.
- Milky Way (2026, U.S.), an imaginative coming-of-age drama from Short Film Palme d'Or winning filmmaker Vasilis Kekatos.
- The Doll Factory (2026, U.S.), a limited series based on the international best-selling novel by Elizabeth Macneal.

== Reception ==
The Network's original programming has drawn coverage and acclaim from major entertainment and arts outlets, with Variety calling The Green Veil (2024) "like gritty, 90's era HBO," and The Artist (2025) receiving positive reviews and acclaim, including The Guardian who awarded the series four out of five stars, and called it "like nothing else on TV," and The New York Times which described the series as "...operatic in its passions and power plays."

== Media coverage ==
The Network has received various national US media coverage including The New York Times, and has been covered by entertainment trade outlets including Variety, IndieWire, Deadline and more, and series talent have been guests on national TV talk and news shows including CBS Mornings, Today Show, Morning Joe, The View, The Late Show with Stephen Colbert, The Tonight Show Starring Jimmy Fallon, Late Night with Seth Meyers, and more.

== Business model ==
The Network operates a free, ad-supported VOD tier that does not require a credit card, alongside a premium subscription at $4.99 per month that removes advertising across nearly all content. Founder Aram Rappaport has said the service was built to apply an independent-film cost model to serialized television, producing star-driven "premium" content at a fraction of typical budgets and offering it for free. In a 2025 interview, Rappaport said the platform had surpassed two million monthly active users, had been profitable to date, and at the 2025 ATX TV Festival Rappaport stated that each new user costs $2 to acquire and generates $13 in revenue for the platform. The Network released a slate of roughly eight programs in 2025 - a mix of scripted originals, reality, documentary, and acquired imports - and stated a goal of releasing one new title per month in 2026.

The service is available across major connected-TV and mobile platforms, including Samsung, Comcast Xfinity (X1), Apple TV, Android, Roku, Amazon Fire TV, and Web.
