= The Old Neighborhood (play) =

Ply by David Mamet

The Old Neighborhood is a play in three parts by David Mamet. It was performed at the Booth Theatre in November 1997.
