= SS Alpena =

American Great Lakes freighter

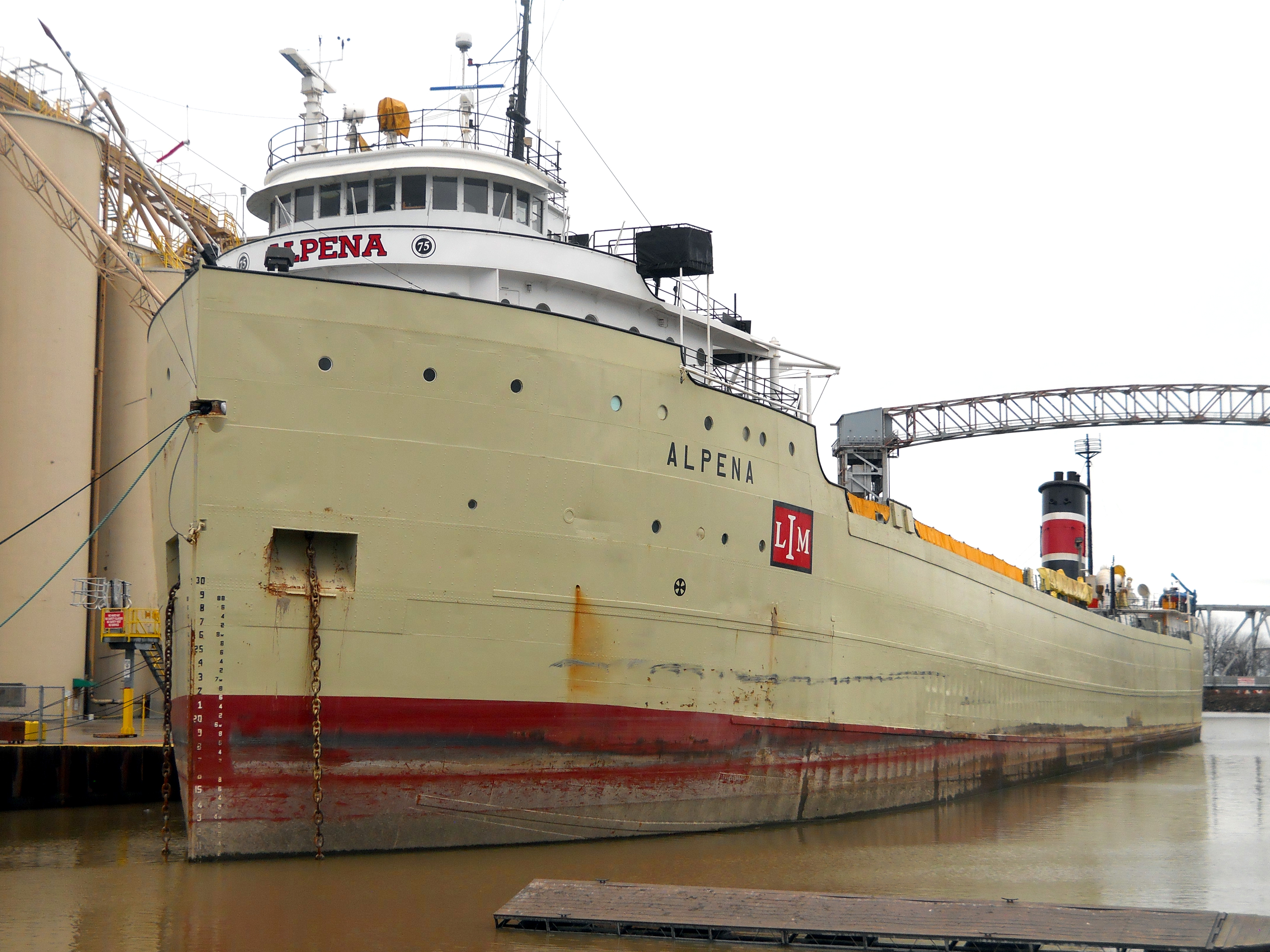
- SS Alpena in Cleveland, Ohio in 2018

History

United States
- Name: SS Leon Fraser (1942-1991); SS Alpena (1991-present)
- Owner: Pittsburgh Steamship Company (1942-82); Andrie Transportation Group, Inland Lakes Management (1991-present)
- Operator: Pittsburgh Steamship Company (1942-82); Andrie Transportation Group, Inland Lakes Management (1991-present)
- Port of registry: Cleveland, Ohio
- Builder: Great Lakes Engineering Works
- Launched: February 28, 1942
- Identification: IMO number: 5206362; MMSI number: 366893910; Callsign: WAV4647
- Status: In service

General characteristics
- Type: Lake freighter
- Tonnage: 5,633 long tons (5,723 t)
- Length: 519 ft (158 m) (since 1991), 639 ft (195 m) (1942–91)
- Beam: 67 ft (20 m)
- Propulsion: De Laval Steam Turbine Company steam turbine engine, two Babcock & Wilcox water-tube boilers
- Speed: 16 mph (26 km/h) (unloaded), 14.5 mph (23.3 km/h) (fully loaded)
- Capacity: 14,000 LT (14,000 t) (since 1991), 18,600 LT (18,900 t) (1942–91)
- Crew: 28 (as of 1991)

SS Alpena (formerly SS Leon Fraser) is a lake freighter. She was built in 1942 by the Great Lakes Engineering Works in Ecorse, Michigan, to carry iron ore. She was originally owned by the Pittsburgh Steamship Company, a subsidiary of United States Steel. After also hauling grain in addition to ore in the 1960s and 1970s, the ship was put into storage in 1982.

In 1989, the ship was purchased by Fraser Shipyards in Superior, Wisconsin, which shortened her by 120 feet (37 m) and converted her into a self-unloading cement carrier. In 1990, the ship was purchased by New Management Enterprises and renamed the SS Alpena, which uses her to transport cement between Alpena, Michigan, and other Great Lakes cement ports.

By 2015, she was the oldest active steamship on the Great Lakes. In December 2015, she was damaged by a fire while in a dry dock for an inspection, returning to service in 2016 after repairs. As of 2024, the ship is owned by Andrie Transportation Group and Inland Lakes Management.

== Ore carrier (SS Leon Fraser) ==
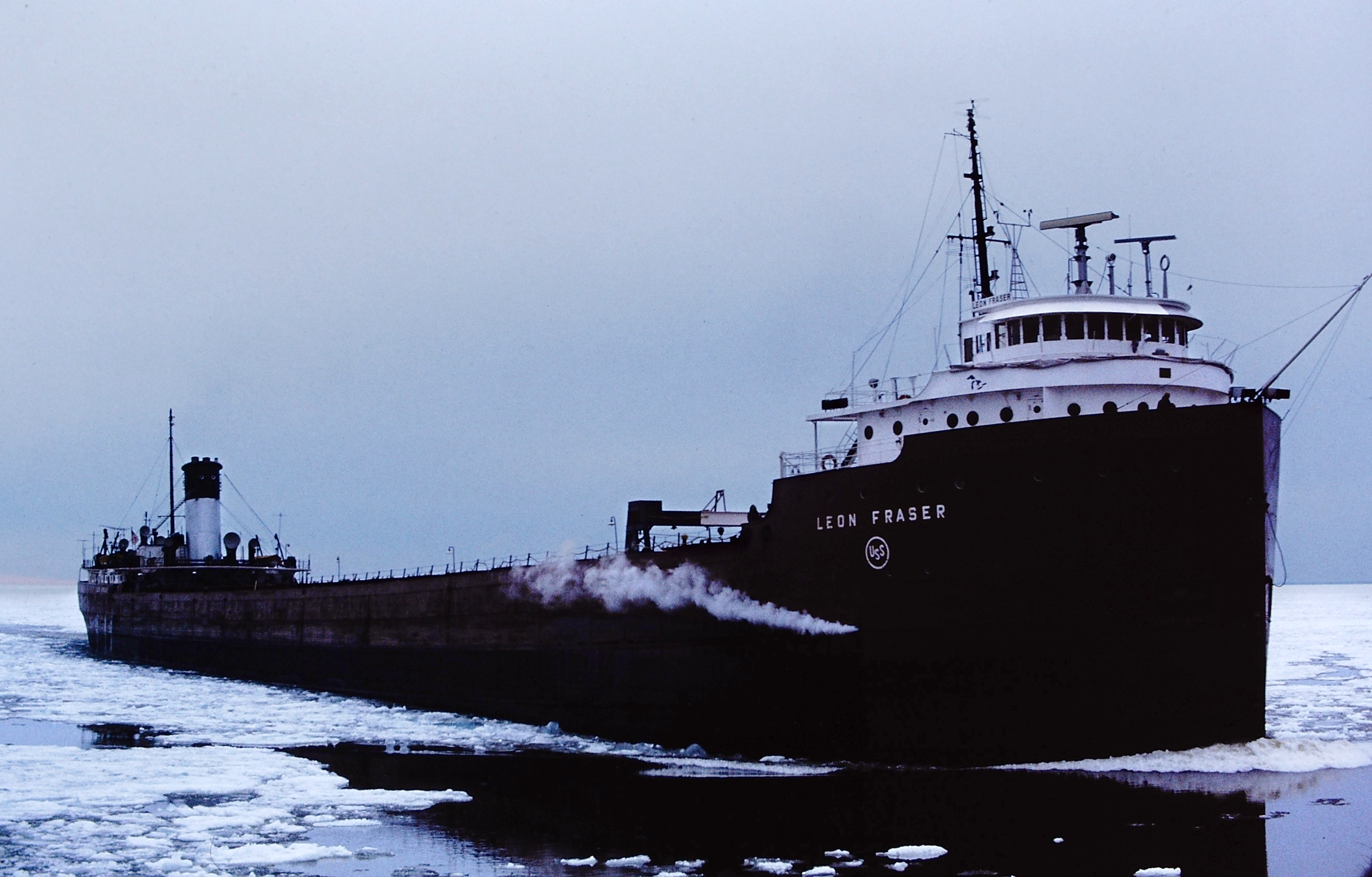
SS Leon Fraser in Duluth, Minnesota, in 1979

The SS Leon Fraser was launched on February 28, 1942. She was built by the Great Lakes Engineering Works at their River Rouge yards in Ecorse, Michigan and named for Leon Fraser, president of the First National Bank of New York and a director of United States Steel.

The Leon Fraser was one of a class of five identical ships built during World War II to carry iron ore. The other four ships in this 639-foot (195 m) class of "super carriers" were the Benjamin F. Fairless, A. H. Ferbert, Irving S. Olds, and Enders M. Voorhees. All ships in this class measured 639 feet (195 m) in length with a breadth of 67 feet (20 m) and a depth of 35 feet (11 m). With a capacity of 18,600 long tons (18,900 t), they had the largest capacity on the Great Lakes when built and could each carry enough iron ore to produce the steel necessary for the construction of eight destroyers. The first in her class to be launched, the Leon Fraser became the longest ship on the Great Lakes by freeboard length, surpassing Canada Steamship Lines' Lemoyne. However, the Lemoyne remained the longest ship as measured by keel length.

The Leon Fraser was fitted with a DeLaval Steam Turbine Company steam turbine engine and two Babcock & Wilcox water-tube boilers.

The Leon Fraser was originally owned by the Pittsburgh Steamship Company, a subsidiary of United States Steel. During this period of ownership, the ship served steel ports on the Great Lakes, including those at Chicago, Illinois; Conneaut, Ohio; Gary, Indiana; and Lorain, Ohio.

In May 1952, Leon Fraser captain A. C. Penzenhagen was accused by property owners living along the St. Clair River of speeding that caused damage-causing waves on shore. Penzenhagen denied the accusations, suggesting the property damage was caused by ice over the winter and early spring.

In the 1960s and 1970s, the ship also hauled grain in addition to ore. In 1982, U.S. Steel's Great Lakes Fleet put the Leon Fraser into storage in Lorain, Ohio.

== Cement carrier (SS Alpena) ==
=== Shortening and conversion ===
In October 1989, the Leon Fraser was purchased by Fraser Shipyards in Superior, Wisconsin, which planned to shorten the ship and convert it into a cement carrier. The following year, she was purchased by New Management Enterprises and renamed the Alpena. According to Alpena third mate Erik Sawyer, shortening the ship would make her stronger by reducing the amount her hull could bend. It also would allow the ship to service ports that were formerly too small for her original size.

The shipyards shortened the Leon Fraser by removing her 120-foot (37 m) midsection in a dry dock, then flooded the dry dock to float the two ends of the ship, and ultimately welded the ends of the ship back together. In addition to being shortened, the ship was also converted into a self-unloading cement carrier. After being shortened, she measures 519 feet (158 m) in length, and weighs 5,633 long tons (5,723 t). The shortening also reduced the ship's capacity to 14,000 long tons (14,000 t), but the Alpena was nonetheless the largest cement carrier on the Great Lakes in 1991.

=== In service ===
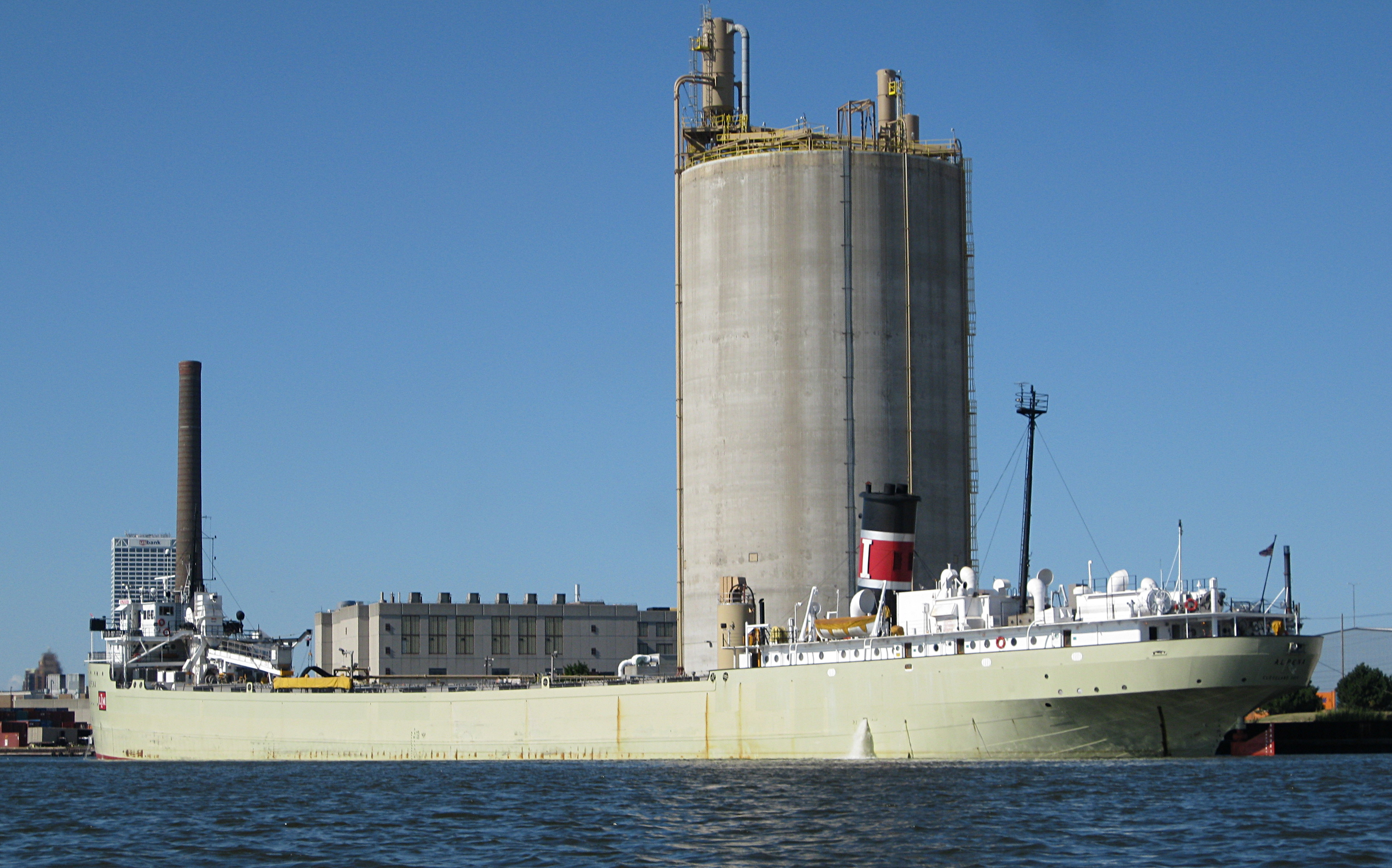
SS Alpena in Milwaukee, Wisconsin in 2011

As of 1991, New Management Enterprises used her to transport cement between Alpena, Michigan, and other Great Lakes cement ports, including Chicago; Duluth, Minnesota; Green Bay, Wisconsin; Milwaukee, Wisconsin; Superior, Wisconsin; and Waukegan, Illinois. That year she was operated by a crew of 28.

In 1999, the Alpena was the largest of Inland Lakes Management's fleet, which also included the Paul H. Townsend, the J.A.W. Iglehart, and the tugboat-barge Integrity. At that time, the Alpena was making about 70 trips per year, typically on Lake Michigan and Lake Superior, during her season from mid-March to late January. She spent the winter at her port of registry, Cleveland, Ohio. Fully loaded, the ship can travel at 14.5 miles per hour (23.3 km/h), and unloaded she can travel at 16 miles per hour (26 km/h).

By 2015, she was the oldest active steamship on the Great Lakes. In 2014, the last active Canadian steamship on the Great Lakes, the Algoma Montrealais, was scrapped, while in the winter of 2015–16 two American steamships (the MV Herbert C. Jackson and the MV John G. Munson) were converted to diesel power.

In December 2015, she was damaged by a fire while in the Fincantieri Bay Shipbuilding (FBS) dry dock in Sturgeon Bay, Wisconsin, for a standard five-year inspection. The fire was estimated to have caused $3 million of damage to the ship. The Alpena was repaired after the fire and returned to service in 2016.

At the end of the 2021 season, the Alpena returned to the dry dock at FBS in Sturgeon Bay for her mandatory five-year inspection. She shared the dry dock with the SS Badger, which was simultaneously undergoing her five-year inspection.

As of 2024, the ship is owned by Andrie Transportation Group (of Muskegon, Michigan) and Inland Lakes Management.

== See also ==
- SS Badger, the last, and largest, coal-fired, steam engine car-ferry built in the United States
- SS St. Marys Challenger, currently an articulated tug barge with the tug MT Prentiss Brown
