= Radcliffe R. Latimer =

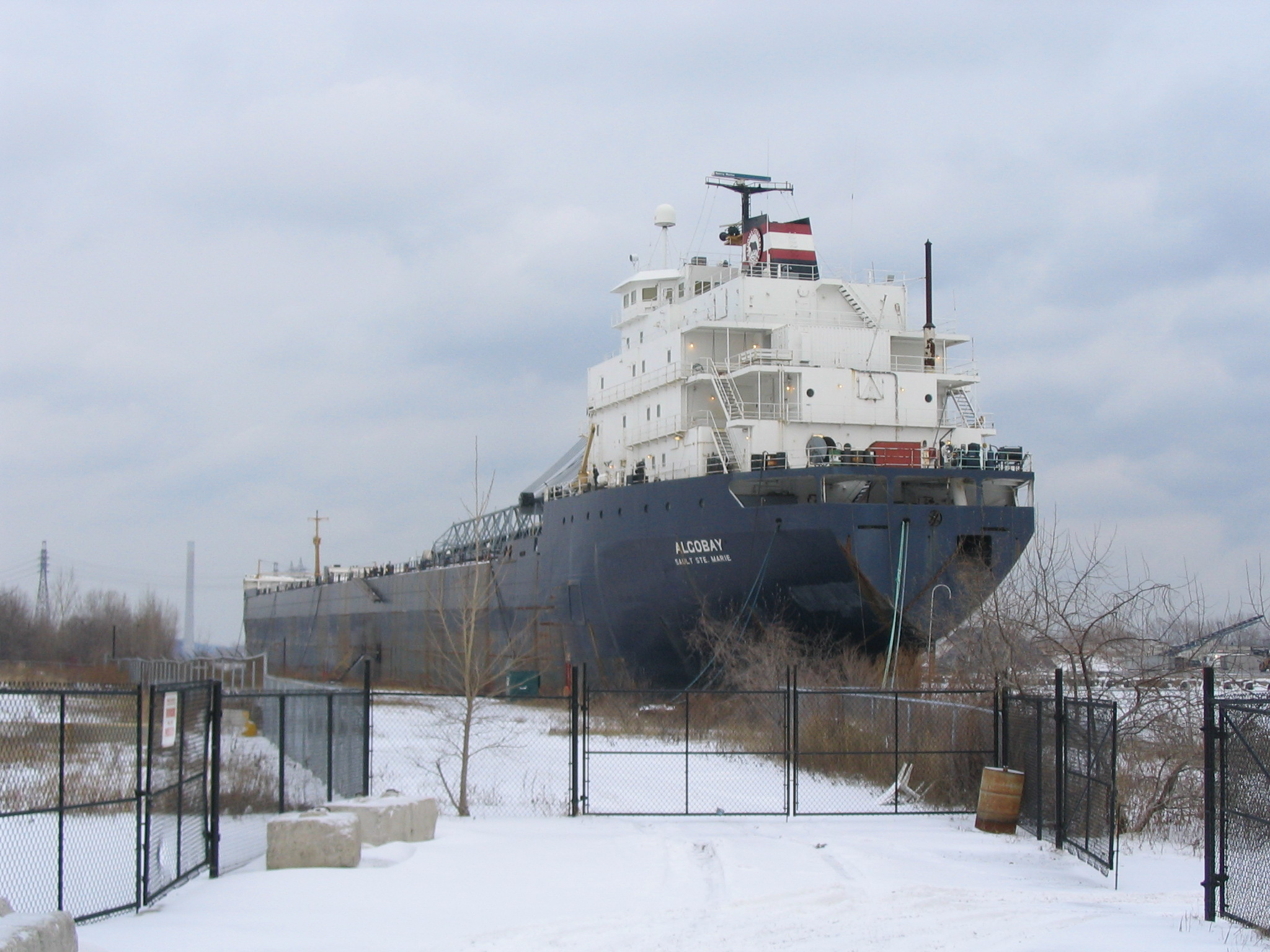
- Bulk carrier Algobay at Toronto in 2005

History
- Name: Algobay (1978–1994); Atlantic Trader (1994–1997); Algobay (1997–2012); Radcliffe R. Latimer (2012–present)
- Owner: Algoma Central
- Operator: Algoma Central
- Builder: Collingwood Shipbuilding, Collingwood, Ontario
- Yard number: 215
- Laid down: 16 August 1977
- Launched: 19 June 1978
- Completed: 11 October 1978
- Identification: IMO number: 7711725
- Status: in active service

General characteristics
- Type: Lake freighter
- Tonnage: 22,465 GRT; 35,028 DWT
- Length: 222.5 m (730 ft 0 in) oa; 216.5 m (710 ft 4 in) pp
- Beam: 23.2 m (76 ft 1 in)
- Propulsion: 1 × diesel engine
- Speed: 14 knots (26 km/h; 16 mph)

Radcliffe R. Latimer (formerly Algobay and Atlantic Trader) is a lake freighter launched in 1978. The vessel is owned by Algoma Central but operated under charter to Canada Steamship Lines from 1994 to 1997. As Algobay, the bulk carrier was involved in a collision with the lake freighter Montrealais in 1980. In 2009 the vessel was rebuilt in China for service in the Caribbean Sea. The vessel is currently in service.

== Description ==
As built, the lake freighter was 222.5 m (730 ft 0 in) long overall and 216.5 m (710 ft 4 in) between perpendiculars with a beam of 23.2 m (76 ft 1 in). The ship had a gross register tonnage (GRT) of 22,465 tons and a deadweight tonnage (DWT) of 35,028 tons. The vessel was powered by a diesel engine driving one propeller giving the bulk carrier a maximum speed of 14 knots (26 km/h; 16 mph).

In 1988, the vessel was updated so that Algobay could provide ocean coastal service to South America. In 2009, the vessel was reconstructed in China. The ship's length overall became 226.1 m (741 ft 10 in) and 220.1 m (722 ft 1 in) between perpendiculars with a gross tonnage (GT) of 24,102 tons and a deadweight tonnage of 37,257 tons. The vessel also received new engines.

== Service history ==
The bulk carrier's keel was laid down on 16 August 1977 by Collingwood Shipbuilding at Collingwood, Ontario, with the yard number 215. The vessel was launched on 19 June 1978 and completed as Algobay on 11 October 1978. Algobay served ports in the Great Lakes and Saint Lawrence Seaway. On 25 June 1980, she collided with the lake freighter Montrealais in the St. Clair River, damaging the bows of both vessels. Algobay was able to sail under her own power to Sarnia, Ontario, for repairs. No one was hurt, though the collision did close the shipping lane and there was a small oil spill.

In 1994, the vessel was chartered to Canada Steamship Lines and renamed Atlantic Trader. The charter ended in 1997, when the vessel assumed her previous name.

In 2008–2009, Algobay was rebuilt in China as a self-unloading vessel for service in the Caribbean Sea. She ran aground on 4 July 2010 near Chippewa Bay, New York, on the St. Lawrence River while carrying a load of Canadian corn. The vessel spent two days aground on a shoal before refloating and continuing on her voyage to Prescott, Ontario. On 4 October 2012, the bulk carrier was renamed Radcliffe R. Latimer for a former chairman of Algoma Central's board of governors.
