= SS St. Marys Challenger =

Lake freighter

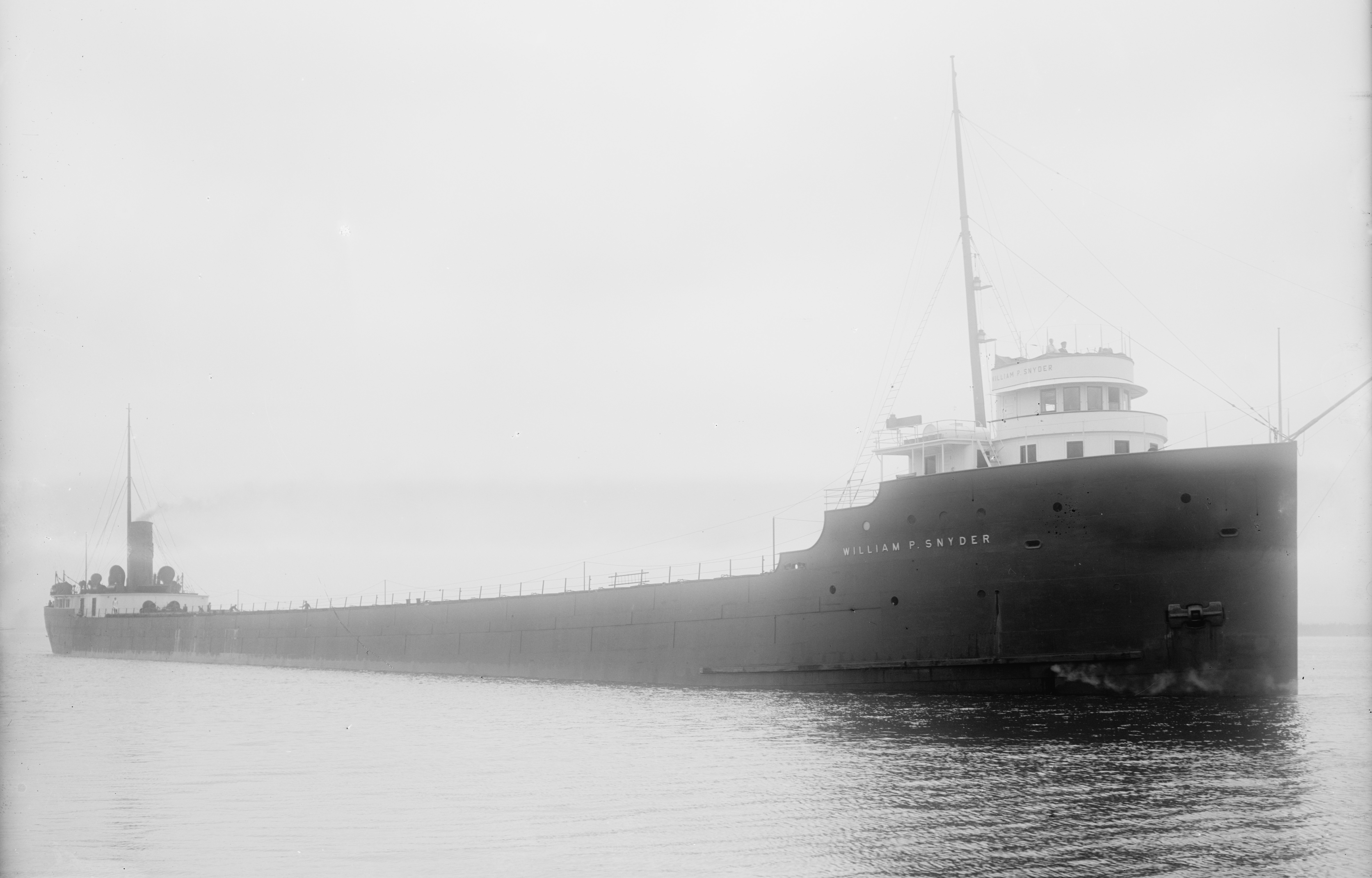
- The William P. Snyder, between 1907 and 1910

History

United States
- Name: St. Marys Challenger
- Operator: Port City Marine Services, Muskegon, MI (Sand Products Corp.)
- Ordered: 1905
- Builder: Great Lakes Engineering Works
- Yard number: 00017
- Laid down: October 16, 1905
- Launched: February 17, 1906
- In service: April 26, 1906
- Identification: IMO number: 5009984; MMSI number: 366970340; Callsign: WDB9135
- Fate: Cut down to barge
- Status: In operation, same capacity, as Articulated Barge (ATB).

General characteristics
- Class & type: Conventional dry bulk Lake freighter
- Length: 552 ft (168 m) - 527 ft (161 m) After ATB Conversion
- Beam: 56 ft (17 m)
- Height: 31 ft (9.4 m)
- Propulsion: Triple Expansion Steam Engine; Repowered in 1950 with Skinner Unaflow Reciprocating Steam Engine; Engine Removed and converted to Articulated Tug-Barge, 2014.
- Capacity: 10,250 tons

The SS St. Marys Challenger is a freight-carrying vessel operating on the North American Great Lakes built in 1906. Originally an ore boat, she spent most of her career as a cement carrier when much larger ore boats became common. After a 107-year-long working career as a self-propelled boat, she was converted into a barge and paired with the tug Prentiss Brown as an articulated tug-barge. Before conversion, she was the oldest operating self-propelled lake freighter on the Great Lakes, as well as being one of the last freight-carrying vessels on the Great Lakes to be powered by steam engines.

== Operating history ==
=== Steamship ===
The vessel was launched on February 7, 1906, by Great Lakes Engineering Works in Ecorse, Michigan. The shipyard had received an order to construct a 551-foot (168 m) Great Lakes bulk carrier for what was then the booming Minnesota iron ore trade. Soon the large boat, christened William P. Snyder, was shuttling hematite for the Shenango Furnace Company. William P. Snyder was beginning her working life at the same time as the development of the assembly line for bolting together consumer goods made with steel, such as automobiles. Iron ore boats would have plenty of work to do. William P. Snyder also carried iron ore to furnaces to make munitions used in World War I and World War II.

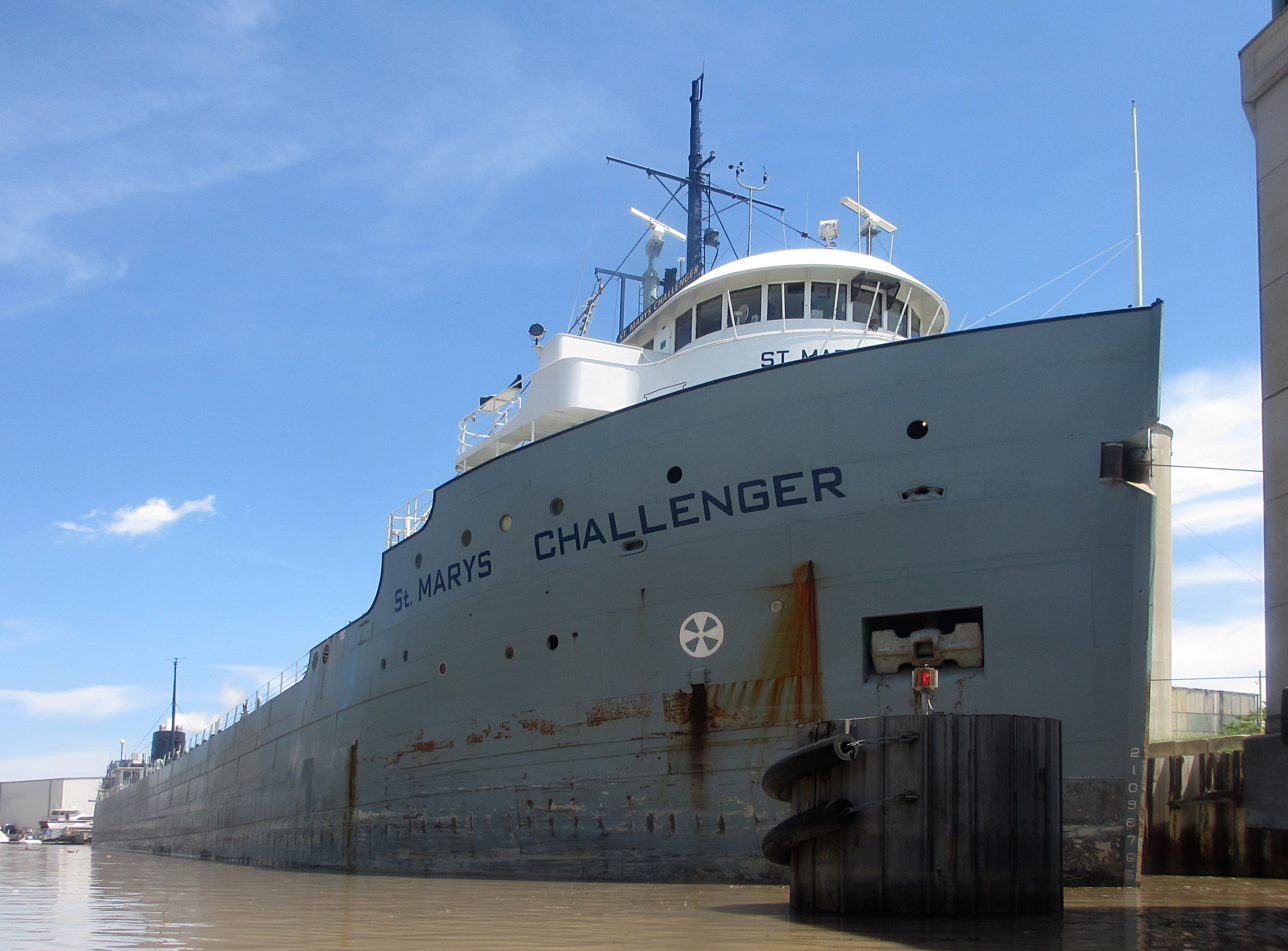
St. Marys Challenger in 2012

The lake carrier was originally powered by two Scotch boilers. In 1926, the vessel was sold to the Stewart Furnace Co. of Cleveland, OH, being renamed Elton Hoyt 2nd. She was sold again in 1929 to the Youngstown Steamship Co., also of Cleveland, being operated by Pickands Mather & Co. In 1930, she was transferred to Pickands Mather's Interlake Steamship Co. as part of a fleet consolidation. Elton Hoyt 2nd was repowered in 1950 with a Skinner Unaflow steam engine and two watertube boilers by the Christy Corporation of Sturgeon Bay, WI. Too small by the 1960s to serve as a profitable ore boat, the vessel was laid up at Erie, PA, in 1962. In 1966, she was plucked out of a freshwater boneyard for reconversion and a new life as a cement carrier for the Medusa Portland Cement Co. She was converted to a self-unloading cement carrier by Manitowoc Shipbuilding of Manitowoc, WI. Now based in Charlevoix, Michigan and named Medusa Challenger, the aging steamship shuttled powdered cement from Northern Michigan to a wide variety of roadbuilding contractors in various port locations on the Great Lakes. In Chicago she acquired a reputation as a "jinx ship" that caused the city's drawbridges to become stuck when they were raised to let her pass, causing long delays to traffic. Such an incident became the setting for the 1977 dramatic film Medusa Challenger. In 1998 the Medusa Corporation was acquired by Southdown Inc., of Houston and the vessel was renamed Southdown Challenger. After two more acquisitions, the vessel became the property of St. Marys Cement Inc. of Toronto in 2005 and finally renamed St. Marys Challenger.

During her second half-century of life the vessel became a favorite of boatwatchers up and down the Great Lakes as a final example of the riveted steamships of the Second Industrial Revolution. St. Marys Challenger was acquired by Port City Marine Services of Muskegon, MI, a subsidiary of the McKee family-owned Sand Products Corporation, who had picked up the contract to haul cement for St. Marys.

=== Barge ===
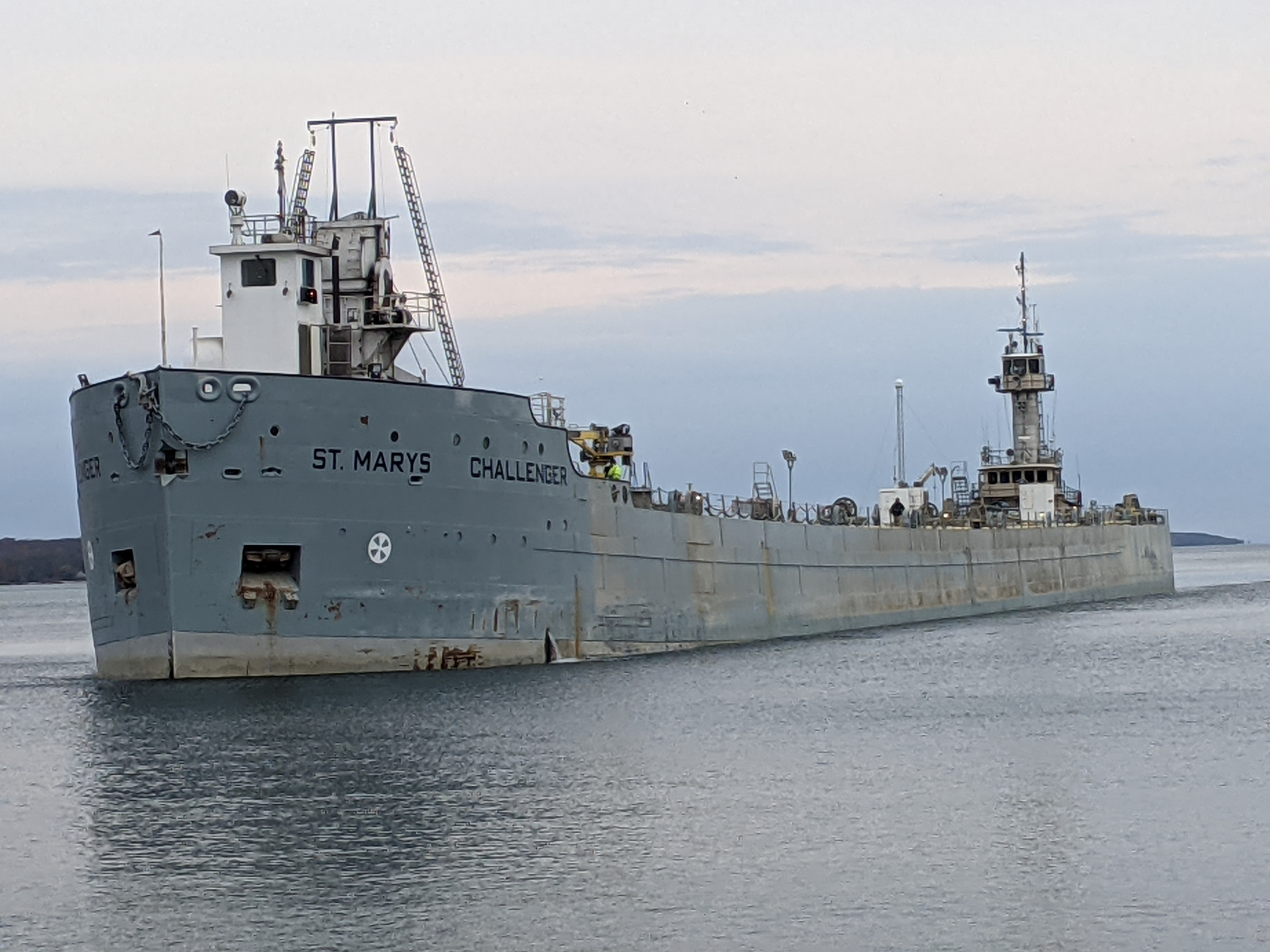
St. Marys Challenger enters the harbour at Owen Sound, Ontario on November 11, 2021.

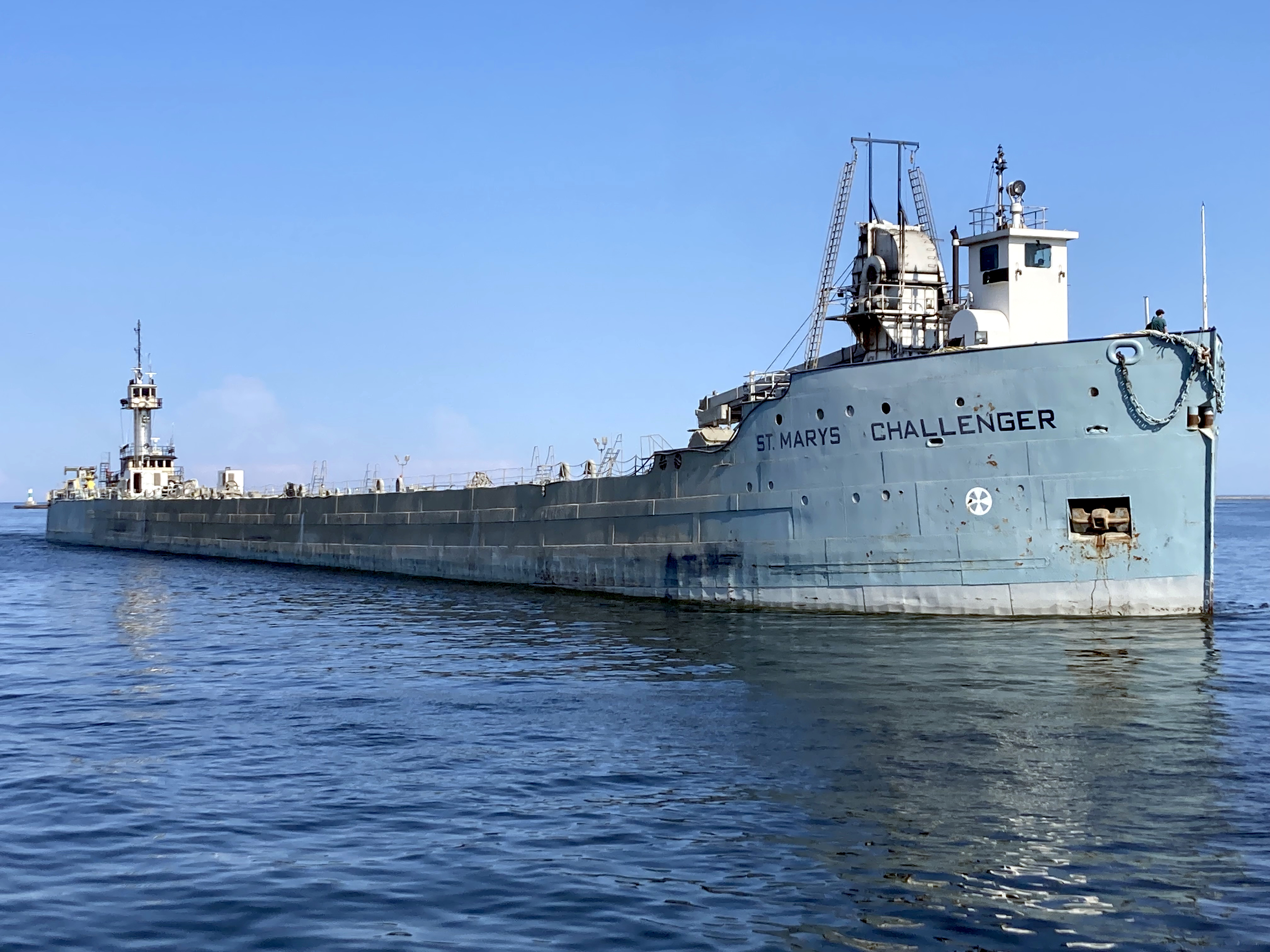
St. Marys Challenger at Milwaukee, July 2025

In November 2013 St. Marys Challenger reached the end of her working life as a self-propelled vessel. She steamed to the Bay Shipbuilding Co. in Sturgeon Bay, Wisconsin, to be cut down to an articulated lake barge pushed by a dedicated tugboat. The refitting of the former steamship lake carrier as a barge was described as a work with a cost of more than $10 million. The tug Prentiss Brown had been built in 1967 at the Gulfport Shipyard in Port Arthur, Texas and worked in Florida, South Carolina, and New York before coming to the Great Lakes in 2008. The two-element vessel combination resumed the dedicated transport of powdered cement on the Great Lakes. In this trade, it was described in 2019 as making about 30 annual trips to the Port of Chicago.

The lake vessel's now-redundant pilothouse was conserved and, in spring 2015, was donated to the National Museum of the Great Lakes for display in Toledo, Ohio. Pilothouse restoration work has uncovered the vessel's original name, William P. Snyder.

== See also ==
- SS Badger The last, and largest, coal-fired, steam engine car-ferry built in the United States
- SS Alpena The oldest steamship currently sailing on the Great Lakes
