= Joe Mantegna =

American actor (born 1947)

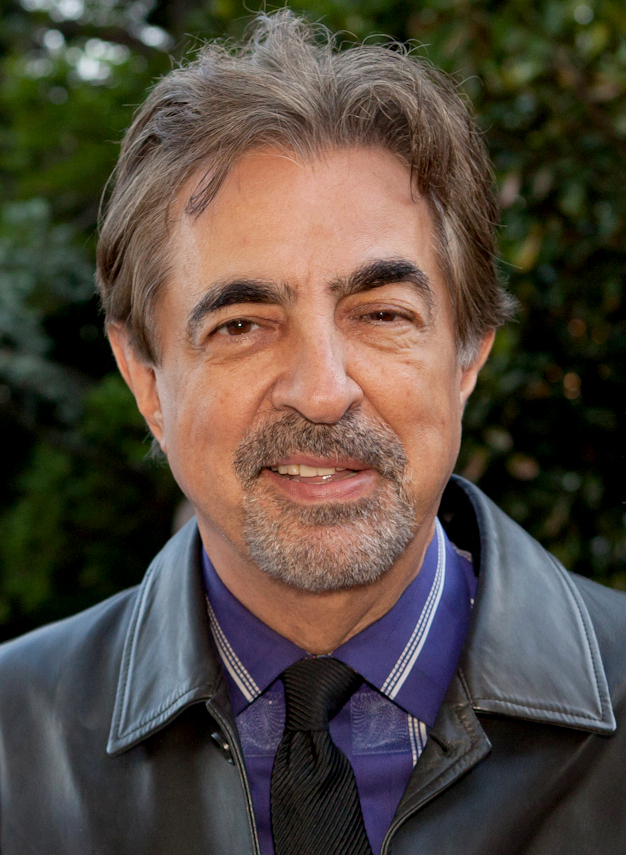
- Mantegna in 2014
- Born: Joseph Anthony Mantegna; November 13, 1947 (age 78); Chicago, Illinois, U.S.
- Occupation: Actor
- Years active: 1969–present
- Spouse: Arlene Vrhel (m. 1975)
- Children: 2, including Gia Mantegna
- Website: joemantegna.com

Joseph Anthony Mantegna (/mɑːnˈteɪnjə/ mahn-TAYN-yə, Italian: [manˈteɲɲa]; born November 13, 1947) is an American actor best known for starring on CBS's Criminal Minds since 2007 as FBI Supervisory Special Agent David Rossi. He has voiced the recurring role of mob boss Fat Tony on the animated series The Simpsons, beginning with the 1991 episode "Bart the Murderer", as well as in The Simpsons Movie (2007).

Mantegna began his career on stage in 1969 in the Chicago production of the musical Hair. He earned a Tony Award for Best Featured Actor in a Play and a Joseph Jefferson Award for portraying Richard Roma in the first American productions of David Mamet's Pulitzer Prize–winning play Glengarry Glen Ross, the first of many collaborations with Mamet. His long-standing association with Mamet includes the premieres of A Life in the Theatre, The Disappearance of the Jews, and Speed-the-Plow on Broadway. Mantegna also directed a highly lauded production of Mamet's Lakeboat, which enjoyed a successful theatrical run in Los Angeles. He later directed the film version of Lakeboat. In addition to theatrical appearances directed by Mamet, Mantegna appeared in Mamet's films House of Games (1987), Things Change (1988) for which he won the Volpi Cup for Best Actor, Homicide (1991), and Redbelt (2008).

Mantegna is best known for his roles in films such as Three Amigos (1986), The Godfather Part III (1990), Forget Paris (1995), and Up Close and Personal (1996). He starred in the television series First Monday (2002) and Joan of Arcadia (2003–2005). He has earned Emmy Award nominations for his roles in three different miniseries: The Last Don (1997), The Rat Pack (1998), and The Starter Wife (2007). He has also served as executive producer for various movies and television movies Hoods (1998), and Lakeboat (2000), which he also directed. Additionally, he played Robert B. Parker's fictional detective Spenser in three made-for-TV movies between 1999 and 2001, and has narrated a number of audiobook editions of the Spenser novels.

== Early life and education ==
Mantegna was born on November 13, 1947, in Chicago, to Italian American parents. His parents were Mary Ann (Novelli; 1916–2017), a shipping clerk from Acquaviva delle Fonti, Apulia, Italy, and Joseph Henry Mantegna (1913–1971), an insurance salesman from Calascibetta, Sicily, who died in 1971 of tuberculosis.

Mantegna was raised Catholic and attended J. Sterling Morton High School East in Cicero, Illinois. He then attended Morton College and the Goodman School of Drama at the Art Institute of Chicago (now at DePaul University), leaving just before graduation in 1969.

As a young man in Chicago, he played bass in a band called The Apocryphals, which later played with another local group, The Missing Links, who went on to form the band Chicago. As of 2007, Mantegna remained very close with the original members of Chicago.

Mantegna started off in the film industry as a photographer, taking head shots.

== Career ==
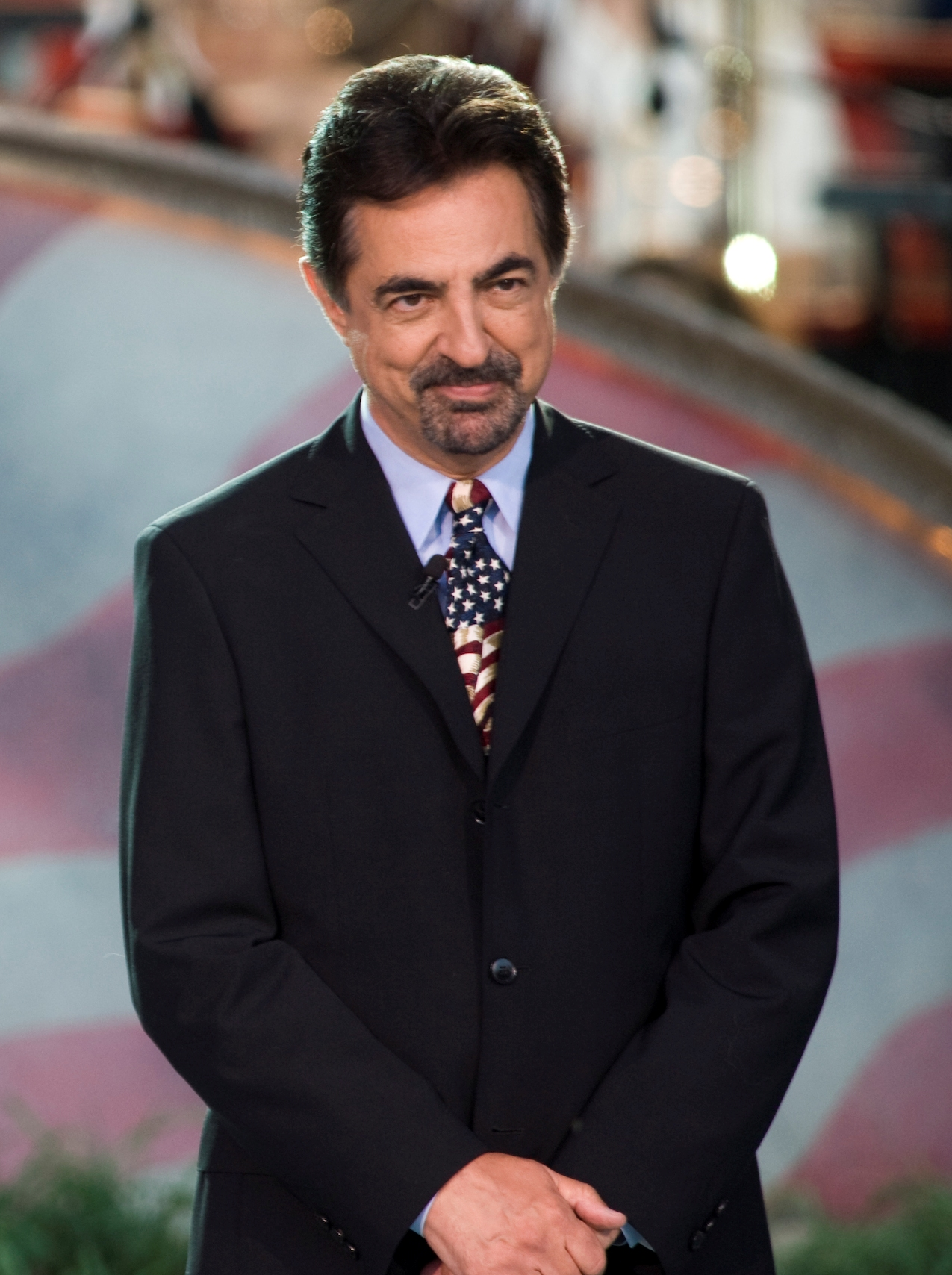
Mantegna in 2009

Mantegna made his acting debut in the Chicago production of the stage musical Hair (1969) and debuted on Broadway in Working (1978). He co-wrote Bleacher Bums, an award-winning play which was first performed at Chicago's Organic Theater Company, and was a member of its original cast. In the movie Xanadu (1980), he had a small role which was cut, although since his name is in the film's credits, Mantegna gets residuals for the film.

Mantegna won a Tony award for his portrayal of Richard Roma in David Mamet's play Glengarry Glen Ross. He has had a long and successful association with Mamet, appearing in a number of his works.

Mantegna made his feature-film debut in Medusa Challenger (1977). He played womanizing dentist Bruce Fleckstein in Compromising Positions (1985). He starred in an episode of The Twilight Zone in 1985 called "Shelter Skelter". His other early film roles were supporting performances in The Money Pit (1986), Weeds (1987), and Suspect (1987).

He also starred in the critically acclaimed movies House of Games (1987) and Things Change (1988), both written by Mamet. Things Change co-star Don Ameche and he received the Best Actor Award at the Venice Film Festival. In 1991, Mantegna starred in another Mamet story, the highly praised police thriller Homicide.

Mantegna has played a wide range of roles, from the comic, as a jaded disc jockey in Airheads and an inept kidnapper from Baby's Day Out, to the dramatic, in roles such as Joey Zasa, a treacherous mobster in The Godfather Part III (1990) and an Emmy-nominated performance as singer Dean Martin in HBO's film The Rat Pack (1998).

Mantegna has a recurring role in the animated series The Simpsons as the voice of mob boss Anthony "Fat Tony" D'Amico. He insists on voicing the character every time he appears, no matter how little dialogue he has. To quote Mantegna: "If Fat Tony sneezes, I want to be there." However, in one instance, Phil Hartman voiced Fat Tony in the episode "A Fish Called Selma".

Mantegna spoofed himself when he hosted Saturday Night Live for the 1990–1991 season in which he calmly began his monologue by saying he did not wish to be typecast from his gangster roles. A disappointed little boy and his father leave, as they mistakenly believed the host would be Joe Montana (the football player) due to the similar names. Mantegna then began speaking in a low, controlled voice to the little boy, telling him it was best to stay in the audience and respect his performance; he warned the boy that if he (Mantegna) made a call, then Montana would not play in his next game—an implication that Mantegna's true personality equaled his gangster roles.

In 2002, Mantegna starred as Associate Justice of the Supreme Court of the United States, Justice Joseph Novelli, on the CBS midseason replacement drama First Monday.

Mantegna received the Lifetime Achievement Award on April 26, 2004, at the Los Angeles Italian Film Festival.

On August 11, 2007, Mantegna signed on to replace departing star Mandy Patinkin on the CBS crime drama Criminal Minds. Starting with season 9, he also directed several episodes.

Mantegna is very close with all his co-stars on Criminal Minds, but is especially close with Shemar Moore. He is said to act like a father figure for Moore.

Since 2006, he has co-narrated the National Memorial Day Concert on the Mall in Washington, DC, with Gary Sinise.

In 2010, he won Scripps Howard's Super Sage Award for predicting that the Saints would beat the Colts, 28-17—just three points off the actual final score of 31–17. Mantegna's guess was the closest out of the 103 celebrities who participated in Scripps Howard's 21st annual Celebrity Super Bowl Poll.

In 2016, he took part in an event at the Los Angeles County Museum of Art reading some of Gabriele Tinti's poems about Hercules.

Mantegna is said to have helped Verne Troyer get into the industry and presented him with the Media Access Award before his death.

== Legacy ==
On April 29, 2011, Mantegna received the 2,438th star on the Hollywood Walk of Fame in Los Angeles. On June 6, 2011, Mantegna's hometown of Cicero, Illinois celebrated his body of work with an honorary street sign—Joe Mantegna Boulevard—on the northeast corner of Austin Boulevard and 25th Street, the location of his high school. In 2014, Mantegna received a star on the Italian Walk of Fame in Toronto. On May 3, 2017, the city of Chicago dedicated Joe Mantegna Way, a section of Armitage Avenue where Mantegna lived during his early acting days.

On April 4, 2015, Mantegna received a Lifetime Achievement Award for Film and Television from the Riverside International Film Festival. On May 22, 2015, Mantegna received the Saint Pio Award from the Saint Pio Foundation, in recognition of his outstanding contribution in being an extraordinary individual in "providing relief from suffering to those in need".

A firearms enthusiast, he is the host of MidwayUSA's Gun Stories on the cable television Outdoor Channel.

== Personal life ==
Mantegna married Arlene Vrhel on October 3, 1975. He said in an interview on The Talk that the 300th episode of Criminal Minds aired on October 3, 2018, their 43rd wedding anniversary, and he apologized during that interview for working on their anniversary.

They have two daughters: Mia and Gia Mantegna. Arlene owned a Chicago-themed restaurant in Burbank, California, named Taste Chicago, which closed on March 22, 2019, for personal reasons. Mia is autistic, has been an actress and writer, and works as a make-up artist. She has also appeared with her father on KCAL-TV in support of Autism Awareness Month (April). Gia was born Gina in 1990 and changed her name at age 18.

Mantegna is a Chicago Cubs fan and has led the singing of "Take Me Out to the Ball Game" during the 7th inning stretch multiple times. This was referenced in the show Criminal Minds, where his character David Rossi's office is decked with Cubs gear.

In 1988, during the play Speed the Plow, Mantegna was stricken with Bell's palsy. Although considered temporary, Mantegna still has persistent facial characteristics of the disease.

== Filmography ==
=== Film ===
Year	Title	Role	Notes
1977	Medusa Challenger	Joe	
1978	Towing	Chris	
1978	A Steady Rain	N/A	
1979	To Be Announced	N/A	
1980	Xanadu	The Muses	Scenes deleted
1983	Second Thoughts	Orderly	
1985	Compromising Positions	Bruce Fleckstein	
1986	The Money Pit	Art Shirk	
1986	Off Beat	Pete Peterson	
1986	Three Amigos	Harry Flugleman	
1987	Critical Condition	Arthur Chambers	
1987	House of Games	Mike Mancuso	
1987	Weeds	Carmine	
1987	Suspect	Charlie Stella	
1988	Things Change	Jerry	
1989	Wait Until Spring, Bandini	Svevo Bandini	
1990	The Godfather Part III	Joey Zasa	
1990	Alice	Joe	
1991	Queens Logic	Al	
1991	Homicide	Bobby Gold	
1991	Bugsy	George Raft	
1993	Body of Evidence	Robert Garrett	
1993	Family Prayers	Martin Jacobs	
1993	Searching for Bobby Fischer	Fred Waitzkin	
1994	Baby's Day Out	Eddie Mauser	
1994	Airheads	Ian	
1995	Captain Nuke and the Bomber Boys	Joey Franelli	
1995	For Better or Worse	Stone	
1995	Forget Paris	Andy	
1995	Above Suspicion	Alan Rhinehart	
1996	Eye for an Eye	Det. Sgt. Denillo	
1996	Up Close & Personal	Bucky Terranova	
1996	Underworld	Frank Gavilan / Frank Cassady / Richard Essex	
1996	Albino Alligator	Agent G.D. Browning	
1996	Thinner	Richie Ginelli	Also narrates audiobook version of original novel.
1996	Persons Unknown	Jim Holland	
1998	Jerry and Tom	Tom	
1998	The Wonderful Ice Cream Suit	Gomez	
1998	For Hire	Alan Webber	
1998	Hoods	Angelo Martinelli	
1998	Celebrity	Tony Gardella	
1998	Boy Meets Girl	Il Magnifico	
1999	Airspeed	Raymond Stone	
1999	Error in Judgment	Eric	
1999	The Runner	Rocco	
1999	Liberty Heights	Nate Kurtzman	
2000	Lakeboat	Guy at Gate	Uncredited also director
2000	Body and Soul	Alex Dumas	
2000	More Dogs Than Bones	Desalvo	
2000	The Last Producer	TBA	
2001	Fall: The Price of Silence	Agent Jim Danaher	
2001	The Trumpet of the Swan	Monty	Voice role
2001	Laguna	Nicola Pianon	
2001	Off Key	Ricardo Palacios	
2001	Turbulence 3: Heavy Metal	Frank Garner	
2002	Mother Ghost	Jerry	
2003	Uncle Nino	Robert Micelli	
2004	First Flight	Robert Sloan	Voice role
2004	Stateside	Gil Deloach	
2004	Pontormo: A Heretical Love	Pontormo	
2004	A Very Married Christmas	Frank Griffin	
2005	Nine Lives	Richard	
2005	Edmond	Man in Bar	
2005	The Kid & I	Davis Roman	
2007	Elvis and Anabelle	Charlie Moreau	
2007	Naked Fear	Sheriff Tom Benike	
2007	Cougar Club	Mr. Stack	
2007	Stories USA	Mike	
2007	The Simpsons Movie	Fat Tony D'Amico	Voice role
2008	Hank and Mike	Mr. Pan	
2008	West of Brooklyn	Gaetano D'Amico	
2008	Witless Protection	Dr. Rondog "Doc" Savage	
2008	Redbelt	Jerry Weiss	
2008	Childless	Richard	
2008	Who's Wagging Who?	Rudy	Voice role
2008	Justice League: The New Frontier	Crooner	Voice role
2008	The Last Hit Man	Harry Tremayne	
2009	Lonely Street	Jerry Finkelman	
2009	Archie's Final Project	Indian Psychiatrist	
2009	The Assistants	Gary Greene	
2009	The House That Jack Built	Jack Sr.	
2010	Pop Shock	Billy	
2010	Valentine's Day	Angry Driver	
2010	Hoods	Angelo 'Ange' Martinelli	
2011	Cars 2	Grem	Voice role
2011	Sacks West	N/A	Short film
2011	The Yule Tide Good Samaritan	Tim O'Neill	
2013	Compulsion	Detective Reynolds	
2014	10 Cent Pistol	Punchy	
2014	AirBurst: The Soda of Doom	MM-Ci	Voice role
2015	Kill Me, Deadly	Benny "Bugsy" Siegel	
2016	The Bronx Bull	Rick Rosselli	
2020	Rolling Thunder	Joe	

=== Television ===
Year	Title	Role	Notes
1979	Elvis	Joe Esposito	Television film
1979	Bleacher Bums	Decker	Television film
1980–1981	Soap	Juan One	7 episodes
1981	It's a Living	Louis Allen	Episode: "Of Mace and Men"
1981	Bosom Buddies	The Shiek	Episode: "The Road to Monte Carlo"
1981–1982	Open All Night	Change/Arab	3 episodes
1982	The Greatest American Hero	Juan	Episode: "Now You See It"
1982	Archie Bunker's Place	Joe Garver	Episode: "Of Mice and Bunker"
1982	Simon & Simon	Henry	Episode: "Emeralds Are Not a Girl's Best Friend"
1984	Comedy Zone	Various	2 episodes
1984	The Outlaws	Yuri	Television film
1985	Big Shots in America	Jovan Joey Shagula	Television film
1987	The Twilight Zone	Harry Dobbs	Episode: "Shelter Skelter"
1991	Saturday Night Live	Host	Episode: "Joe Mantegna/Vanilla Ice"
1991–present	The Simpsons	Fat Tony D'Amico / Fit-Fat Tony D'Amico / Gordus Antonius	Voice role; 46 episodes
1992	The Comrades of Summer	"Sparky" Smith	Television film
1992	The Water Engine	Lawrence Oberman	Television film
1993	Fallen Angels	Carl Streeter	Episode: "The Quiet Room"
1993	Frasier	Derek Mann	Voice role; episode: "I Hate Frasier Crane"
1994	State of Emergency	Dr. John Novelli	Television film
1995	Favorite Deadly Sins	Frank Musso	Television film
1997	Duckman	Rube Richter	Voice role; 2 episodes
1997	Rugrats	Jack Montello	Voice role; episode: "Looking for Jack"
1997	A Call to Remember	Davis Tobias	Television film
1997	Face Down	Bob Signorelli	Television film
1997	Merry Christmas, George Bailey	Joseph/Nick	Television film
1997	The Last Don	Pippi De Lena	Miniseries
1998	The Great Empire: Rome	Narrator	Television film
1998	The Rat Pack	Dean Martin	Television film
1999	Spenser: Small Vices	Spenser	Television film
1999	My Little Assassin	Fidel Castro	Television film
2000	Thin Air	Spenser	Television film
2001	The Sopranos	Ad Narrator	Episode: "He Is Risen"; uncredited
2001	Walking Shadow	Spenser	Television film
2002	First Monday	Justice Joseph Novelli	Main role; 13 episodes
2002	Women vs. Men	Michael	Television film
2002	And Thou Shalt Honor	Host/Narrator	Television film
2002	Inside NYPD Blue : A Decade On The Job	Host/Narrator	Documentary
2003–2005	Joan of Arcadia	Will Girardi	Main role; 45 episodes
2006	Let Go	Jack Rossati	Unsold television pilot
2006	Kim Possible	Jimmy Blamhammer	Voice role; episode: "And the Mole Rat Will Be CGI"
2007–2008	The Starter Wife	Lou Manahan	8 episodes
2007–present	Criminal Minds	David Rossi	Main role; 313 episodes
2011	The War of 1812	Narrator	Documentary
2011–2016	Gun Stories	Himself	Host
2016–2017	Criminal Minds: Beyond Borders	David Rossi	2 episodes
2017	Hell's Kitchen: All-Stars	Himself	Episode: "Raising the Bar"
2022	As We See It	Lou Hoffman	Main role; 8 episodes
2022	Barry	Himself	2 episodes
2026	American Dad!	Bingoni "Bing" Goon (voice)	Episode: "Where the Wild Boars Are"

=== As a director ===
Year(s)	Title	Notes
2000	Lakeboat	
2011	QuickBites	2 episodes
2014–2025	Criminal Minds	12 episodes

== Theater ==
Year	Title	Role	Notes
1969	Hair	Performer	
1973	Godspell	Judas Iscariot	
1978	Working	Emilio Hernandez / Dave McCormick	
1984–1985	Glengarry Glen Ross	Richard Roma	
1988	Speed-the-Plow	Bobby Gould	

== See also ==
- List of people with Bell's palsy
