= List of people with Bell's palsy =

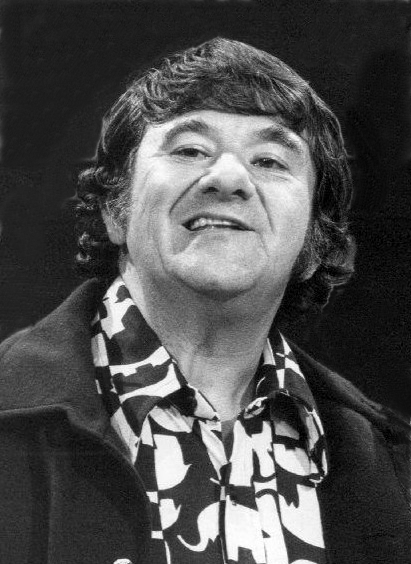
Buddy Hackett had Bell's palsy as a child, the lingering effects of which contributed to his distinctive slurred speech and his tendency to speak out the right side of his mouth.

Well-known people who have been diagnosed with Bell's palsy include:

- Roseanne Barr, American comedian and actress whose condition occurred as a child
- Stevie Benton, bassist for Texas rock band Drowning Pool
- Hafþór Júlíus Björnsson, Icelandic professional strongman, actor, and professional basketball player
- Amy Brenneman, American actress and producer
- Pierce Brosnan, Irish actor, film producer and environmentalist
- Jean Chrétien, prime minister of Canada
- George Clooney, American actor, director, producer, and screenwriter
- Norm Coleman, former United States Senator
- Cassi Davis, American actress
- Alexis Denisof, American actor
- Glen Durrant, BDO World Darts Champion
- Joel Embiid, Cameroonian-American basketball player, diagnosed during the 2024 NBA playoffs
- Thomas C. Foley, American politician and businessman; U.S. Ambassador to Ireland
- David Frum, Canadian-American pundit
- Graeme Garden, British comedy writer and performer, who has written about his experiences with the condition
- Allen Ginsberg, American beat poet
- Tony Gonzalez, American NFL football player
- Amy Goodman, American journalist and author
- Jane Greer, American actress
- Trenton Hassell, American basketball player for the New Jersey Nets of the NBA
- Terrence Howard, American actor
- Armando Iannucci, Scottish writer
- Angelina Jolie, American actress and filmmaker
- Jess Kerr, New Zealand cricketer
- Anupam Kher, Indian actor
- Ralph Kiner, American baseball player in the 1940s and 1950s
- Emmett King, musician, artist, garden gnome, and home chef.
- Ella Koon, Tahitian-born Hong Kong singer-actress
- Curtis LeMay, United States Air Force general and 1968 independent vice presidential candidate
- Gordon Lightfoot, Canadian singer
- Raageshwari Loomba, Indian singer, actress
- Martin Love, Australian cricketer
- Joe Mantegna, American actor
- Pete Maravich, American basketball player
- Florence Mars, American civil rights activist and author
- Tom McCarthy, Canadian National Hockey League player who played for the Minnesota North Stars and Boston Bruins
- Glenda McKay, British actress
- Danny Meyer, American restaurateur in New York City; chief executive officer of Union Square Hospitality Group
- Scarlett Moffatt, British television personality
- Kim Mulkey, American basketball player and coach (LSU women)
- Ralph Nader, American politician
- Piper Niven, Scottish professional wrestler
- Cliff Pennington, shortstop for the Oakland Athletics
- Demond Price (Conway The Machine), musician and member of rap group Griselda.
- Jim Ross, professional wrestling commentator for WWE, WCW, NJPW, and AEW
- Rick Savage, bass guitarist for the British rock band Def Leppard
- Tom Seaver, Hall of Fame Major League pitcher
- Bernadette Sembrano, Filipino newscaster, host of the medical program Salamat Dok! and anchor of TV Patrol Weekend
- Ayrton Senna, Brazilian Formula One racecar driver
- Rahul Sharma, Indian cricketer
- Jamey Sheridan, American actor whose condition was written into the show Law and Order: Criminal Intent
- Sarah Smart, English actress
- Mike South, American pornographic director
- Bruce Sutter, American Major League Baseball pitcher
- Taso N. Stavrakis, American actor and stuntman
- Eric Swalwell, American politician and currently serving as the U.S. representative for California's 15th congressional district
- Bart Tommelein, Belgian politician
- Kevin Tsai, Taiwanese writer and TV host
- Tulisa, British singer
- Colin Turkington, British touring car racing driver
- Evan Turner, American basketball player
- Chris Walker, British superbike racer
- Wesley Walker, American football player (New York Jets) was unable to blink his left eye due to Bell's palsy in 1982, but played football anyway
- Andrew Lloyd Webber, British composer
- Joseph C. Wilson, American diplomat
- Nancy Zieman, American television host of the show Sewing with Nancy
- PChal, German streamer and YouTuber
