= Medusa Challenger =

- Directed by: Steven Elkins
- Written by: Steven Elkins
- Produced by: Phillip Koch
- Starring: Joe Mantegna; Jack Wallace
- Release date: May 19, 1977
- Running time: 25 minutes
- Country: United States
- Language: English

Medusa Challenger (1977) is a dramatic short film that was Joe Mantegna’s first film. The film has been honored with numerous film festival awards and critical accolades. The film is in the permanent collection of the Museum of Modern Art in New York, the American Film Institute Collection in Washington, D.C., and the Chicago Film Archives. The film is one of the few American films widely seen (legally) in the People’s Republic of China.

== Plot ==
Medusa Challenger is the story of two flower sellers, Uncle Jack (Jack Wallace) and his nephew Joey (Joe Mantegna), who sell flowers on the busy Lake Shore Drive bridge in downtown Chicago. When the huge cement carrier Medusa Challenger causes the drawbridge to be raised and traffic to be stopped, Jack and Joey become separated. Jack is chatting with Al the bridge tender in the tower where the bridge controls are located while Joey is watching "the stuff," the fresh flowers they hope to sell, on the other side of the bridge. Jack worries about Joey since Joey is mentally challenged. Jack is determined to get across the river so he commandeers a rowboat and rows across the Chicago River just as the big boat steams straight towards him. However, Joey rises to the occasion and sells all the flowers to the cars stopped by the bridge raising. Jack learns a new appreciation of Joey’s abilities and potential.

== Background/production ==
Medusa Challenger was shot in the summer of 1976, before the Lake Shore Drive "S" curve was straightened. The film was released in theaters in 1977, premiering at Chicago’s Biograph Theater. Medusa Challenger was produced by Phillip Koch and written and directed by Steven Elkins.

The Medusa Challenger is an actual vessel that became notorious in Chicago during the 1960s and 1970s because the city's drawbridges often got stuck when they were raised to let her pass, causing delays similar to the setting for this film. She was renamed in 1998 and 2005 as a result of corporate acquisitions. Now known as the St. Marys Challenger, she underwent conversion from a powered steamship to a barge beginning in 2013. Propelled by a dedicated tugboat, she visits the Chicago area some 30 times a year without incident.

The drawbridge over Lake Shore Drive at the Chicago River is one of the largest double bascule bridges in America.

== Critical reception ==
"A gem. A….masterpiece of economic cinematic storytelling…that in its flawless economy recalls classic shorts such as Roman Polanski’s Two Men and A Wardrobe. Generates considerable suspense because Wallace and Mantegna are such good actors."—Kevin Thomas, Los Angeles Times

"Every once in a while a film comes along which is a pure joy to watch. The film is a gem, a ray of sunshine that brightens the day. Medusa Challenger is such a film. Anyone who sees this film will come away richer for it."—Barbara Flynn, Film News

"Engaging and quietly touching…The movie has the clarity of narrative and bittersweet view of human nature of an O. Henry story."—Roger Ebert, Chicago Sun-Times

"Beautifully acted and produced…a moving and loving short film. They have seen that area…with an eye for beauty that could only come from affectionate natives."—Richard Christiansen, Chicago Daily News

"Excellent. Mantegna’s performance is a masterpiece. A hauntingly beautiful musical score. A cinematic folk poem."—David Jones, Chicago Reader

== Awards and recognition ==
- 1977: Recipient of Arts Grant, Illinois Arts Council
- 1978: Blue Ribbon, American Film Festival
- 1978: Gold Plaque, Chicago International Film Festival
- 1978: Gold Medal, Virgin Islands Film Festival
- 1978: Special Jury Award, Virgin Islands Film Festival
- 1978: Special Jury Award, San Francisco International Film Festival
- 1978: Selected Film for Young Adults, American Library Association
- 1978: screening, Melbourne International Film Festival
- 1980: Emmy Award, Chicago Chapter, National Academy of Television Arts & Sciences
- 1980: Permanent Collection, Museum of Modern Art, New York
- 1986: USA Independent Showcase, American Film Institute
- 2008: added to American Film Institute Collection
