= Algoma Montrealais =

Canadian lake freighter

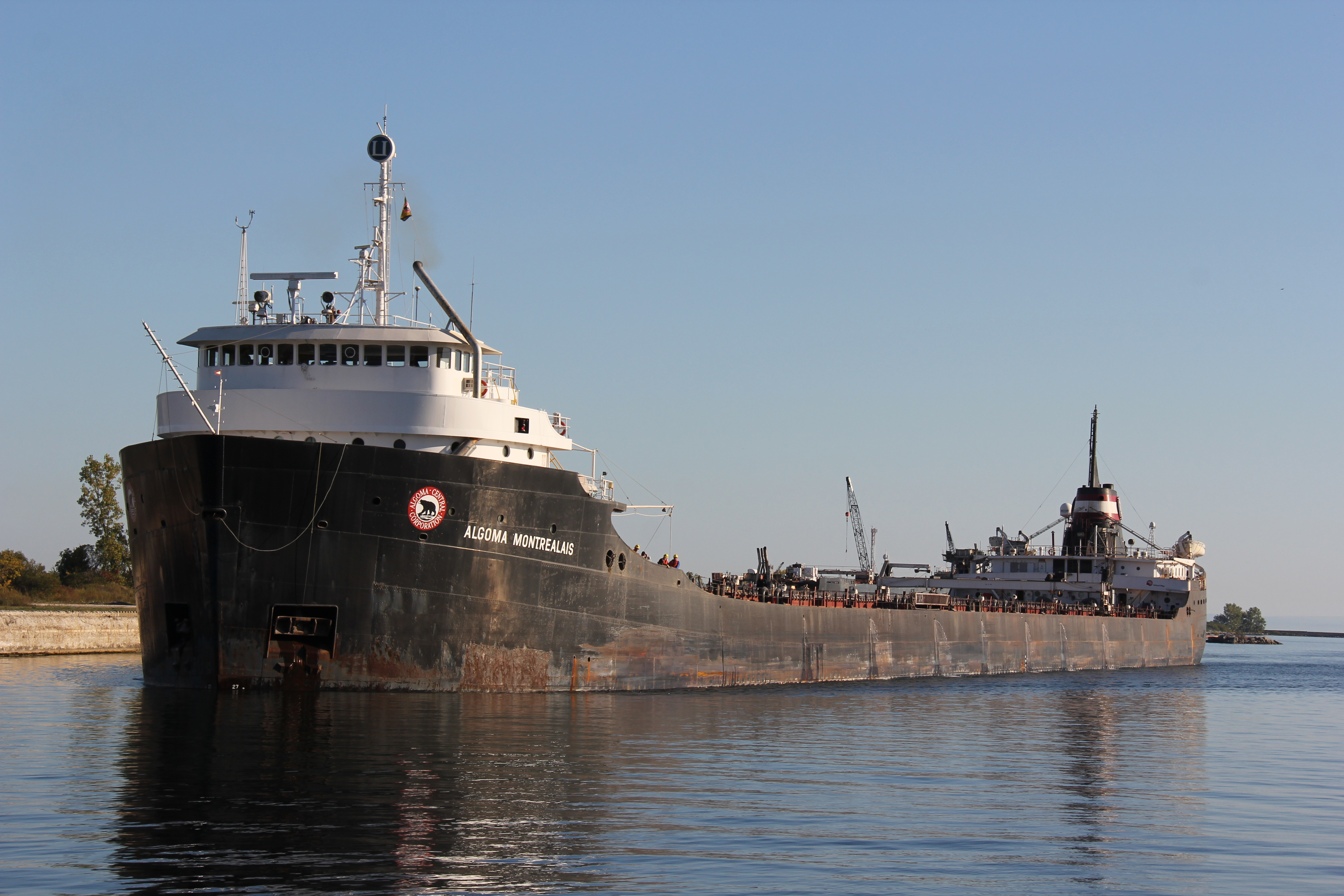
- Algoma Montrealais entering Port Colborne harbour on its way down the Welland Canal on 27 September 2014

History
- Name: Montrealais
- Owner: Canadian Vickers (1962–1964); Papachristidis Co Ltd (1964–1972); Jackes Sg Ltd (1972–1975); Upper Lakes Sg Ltd (1975–2012)
- Port of registry: (Canada) Montreal (1962–1972); (Canada) Toronto (1972–2012)
- Builder: Canadian Vickers, Montreal
- Yard number: 278
- Launched: 15 November 1961
- Completed: April 1962
- Renamed: Algoma Montrealais (2012); Mont (2015)
- Identification: IMO number: 5241142
- Fate: Broken up at Aliağa, Turkey beginning on 10 July 2015

General characteristics
- Type: Lake freighter
- Tonnage: 17,647 GRT; 27,840 DWT
- Length: 222.5 m (730.0 ft) oa; 215.7 m (707.7 ft) pp
- Beam: 23 m (75.5 ft)
- Propulsion: 1 × steam turbine
- Speed: 16.5 knots (30.6 km/h; 19.0 mph)

Montrealais was a lake freighter launched in 1961. Constructed in two parts, the vessel was completed in 1962 and registered in Canada. Utilized as a bulk carrier, the vessel served on the Great Lakes until 2015. Montrealais was sold three times between 1962 and 2012, when the freighter was acquired by Algoma Central and renamed Algoma Montrealais. The bulk carrier continued in service until 2015, when the vessel was renamed Mont and sold for scrap. Mont was taken to Aliağa, Turkey and scrapped beginning on 10 July 2015.

== Description ==
Montrealais was 222.5 m (730.0 ft) long overall and 215.7 m (707.7 ft) between perpendiculars. The vessel had a beam of 23 m (75.5 ft) and was powered by one steam turbine. The lake freighter had a maximum speed of 16.5 knots (30.6 km/h; 19.0 mph). The vessel had a gross register tonnage of 17,647 GRT and a deadweight tonnage of 27,840 DWT.

== Service history ==
Montrealais was constructed in two sections, with the forepart of the ship built by G T Davie Shipbuilding at Lauzon, Quebec. The forepart was launched on 15 November 1961. The aft section was constructed by Canadian Vickers at their yard in Montreal, Quebec, and named Montrealer. The aft section was launched in November 1961. The sections were joined and the vessel was completed as Montrealais in April 1962. When completed, she was the largest Canadian freighter on the Great Lakes.

Initially owned by Canadian Vickers and registered in Montreal, Montrealais was sold to Papachristidis Co Ltd in 1964. The new owners retained the ship's name and registry in Montreal. The bulk carrier was sold again in 1972 to Jackes Shipping Ltd which kept the vessel's name, but changed Montrealais' registry to Toronto, Ontario. Jackes Shipping transferred ownership of Montrealais to Leitch Tpt Ltd in 1975. In 1976 Upper Lakes Shipping acquired Montrealais.

On 25 June 1980 Montrealais collided with Algobay in the St. Clair River in dense fog at 05:08 while transiting in opposite directions. Both ships suffered severe damage to their bows as a result of the collision. No crewmembers were injured in the collision, but some oil was spilled into the St. Clair River. As a result, the shipping channel was closed until 07:30. Montrealais required over $1.5 million CAD in repairs.

The ship's captain was issued the ceremonial top hat traditionally issued to the captain of the first vessel to set out to transit the St. Lawrence Seaway, in 1963 and 2009.

In 2012, Upper Lakes Shipping's fleet was sold to Algoma Central The vessel was renamed Algoma Montrealais and operated by Algoma Central. Algoma Montrealais wintered in Montreal in 2014, laying up for the winter on 30 December 2014. The winter of 2013–2014 was a hard winter on the Great Lakes, and to provide additional tonnage to help ease the back-log, Algoma Montrealais was activated for the 2014 season. In May 2015, Algoma Montrealais was taken out of service and renamed Mont. The vessel was towed to Aliağa, Turkey for scrapping, which began on 10 July 2015. Algoma Montrealais was the last steam-powered lake freighter that operated under the Canadian flag on the Great Lakes.
